= John Riordan =

John Riordan may refer to:

- John Riordan (mathematician) (1903–1988), American mathematician
- John Riordan (banker), American banker, "Oskar Schindler of the Vietnam War"
- John R. Riordan (born 1943), Canadian biochemist
- John Riordan (businessman), Canadian businessman, owner of Riordon Paper Mills and The Toronto Mail (from 1877 to 1895)
- John Riordan (jockey) (1936–2021), New Zealand jockey

== See also ==
- John Riordan Three-Decker, a historic house in Worcester, Massachusetts
