= Printers Building =

- The Printers Building
- U.S. National Register of Historic Places
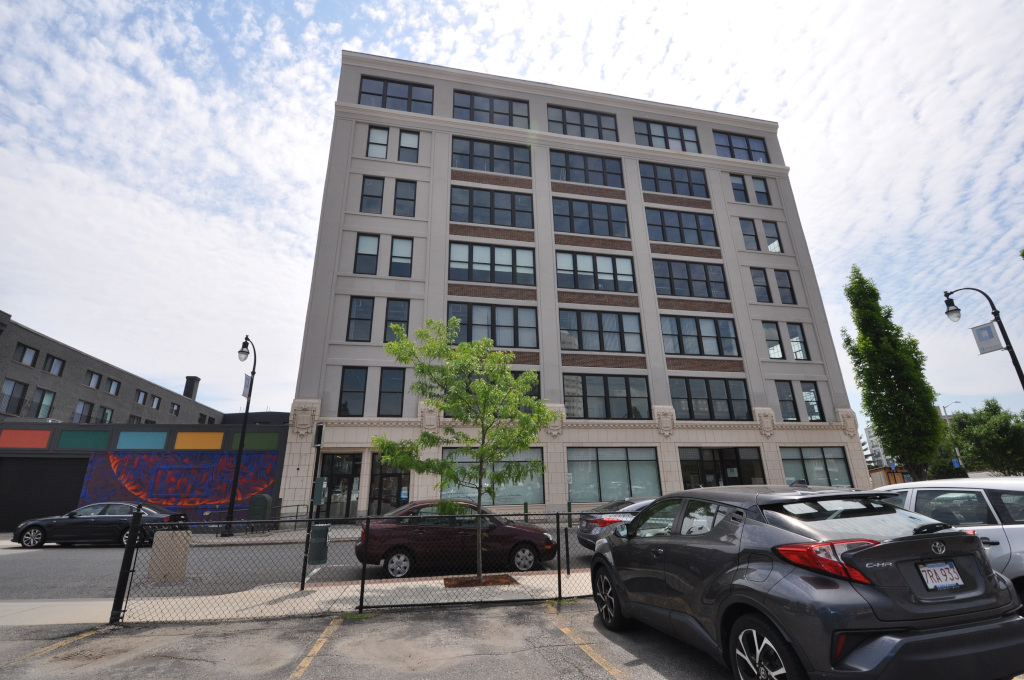

- Location within Massachusetts Location within the United States
- Location: 44-50 Portland St., Worcester, Massachusetts
- Coordinates: 42°15′36″N 71°48′8″W
- Area: less than one acre
- Built: 1923
- Architect: Timmis, Walter S.
- Architectural style: Classical Revival
- NRHP reference No.: 80000585
- Added to NRHP: March 05, 1980

The Printers Building is a historic commercial/industrial building at 44–50 Portland Street in downtown Worcester, Massachusetts. Completed in 1923 for a local printing industry trade group, it continues to serve that role under original ownership, and houses one of its original tenants. The building was listed on the National Register of Historic Places in 2020.

== Description and history ==
The Printers Building is located just south of Worcester Common, on the east side of Portland Street between Austin and Federal Streets. It is a seven story structure, built out of reinforced concrete with a facing of brick and stone and covered by a flat roof. The main facade is five bays wide, each bay housing a storefront (or redesigned former storefront) on the ground floor except the one at the center right, which houses the main entrance. The ground floor is separated from the upper levels by a decorative stone band with cartouches between the bays. The upper levels house groups of windows: the outer bays with two sash windows, and the inner bays with four. The center bays of the 2nd through 6th floors are separated by bands of brickwork.

Worcester's broadly diversified industrial economy included a number of printing businesses. In 1922, several of these banded together to provide a building in which printing and publishing operations could be equitably priced and supported. Among them were Commonwealth Press, which operated on the premises until 1989, and Davis Press, now Davis Publications, which continues to operate publication offices from the building. Ownership of the building was vested in a trust established for the purpose, which continues to maintain the premises. The building was designed by New York City architect Walter S. Timmis, a specialist in buildings for printers. As originally designed, it housed retail spaces on the ground floor, publication offices on the second, and printing operations on the upper levels. The upper levels were specifically reinforced to support the action of heavy duty presses of the time.

== See also ==
- National Register of Historic Places listings in northwestern Worcester, Massachusetts
- National Register of Historic Places listings in Worcester County, Massachusetts
