= Alexander Marsh House =

Historic house in Massachusetts, United States

- U.S. National Register of Historic Places
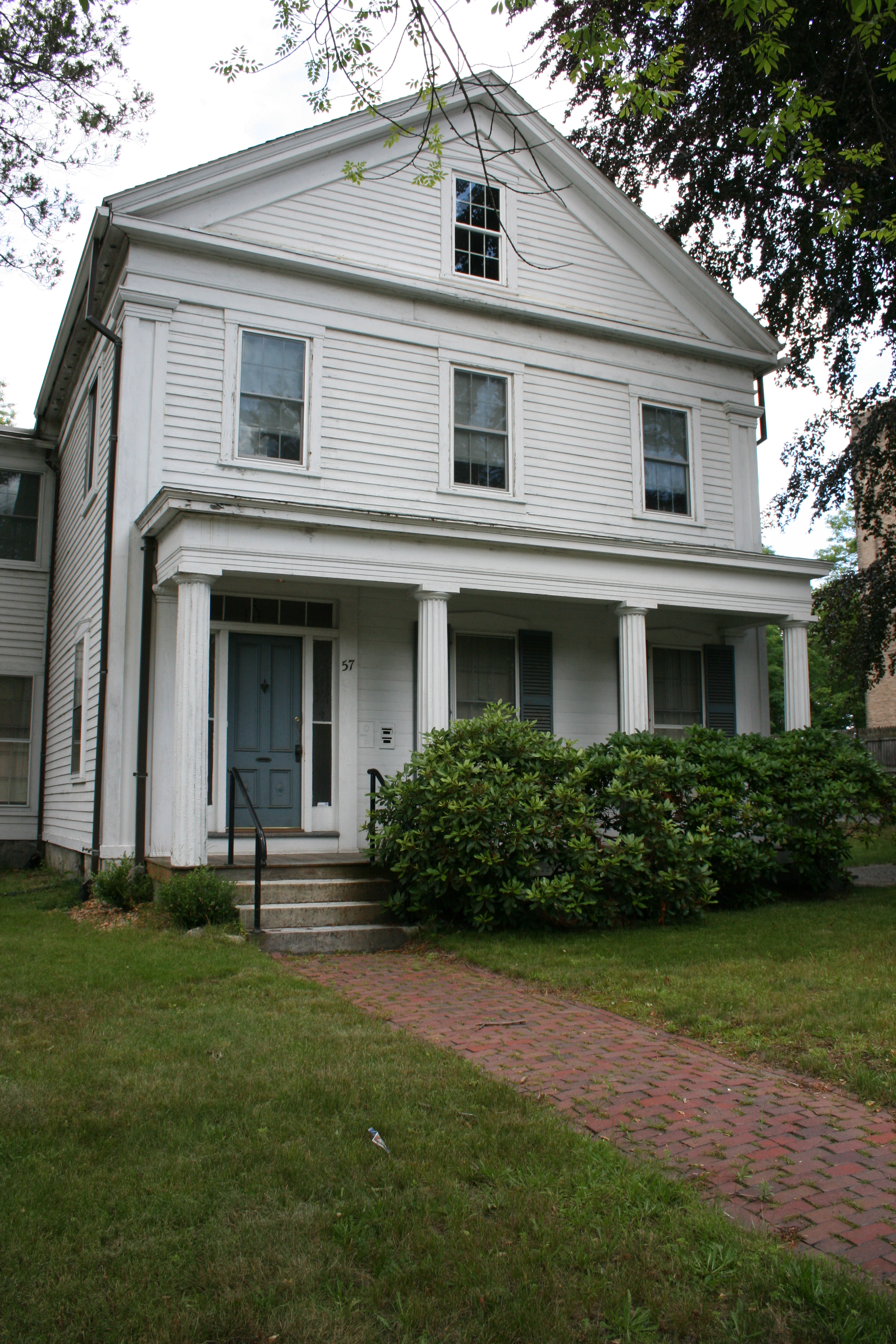

- Location within Massachusetts Location within the United States
- Location: 57 Elm St., Worcester, Massachusetts
- Coordinates: 42°15′56″N 71°48′29″W
- Built: 1848
- Architectural style: Greek Revival
- MPS: Worcester MRA
- NRHP reference No.: 80000583
- Added to NRHP: March 5, 1980

The Alexander Marsh House is an historic house located in Worcester, Massachusetts.

== Description and history ==
The 1 1/2-story Greek Revival cottage was built in 1848 by Levi Lincoln Jr., and is a well-preserved and relatively unaltered instance of what was then a widely popular form. The house has a typical side hall plan, with an entry framed by sidelight windows, with full-length windows to the entry's right. The front-facing gable end is fully pedimented, and the porch is supported by fluted Doric columns. The house's first occupant was Alexander Marsh, a piano dealer.

The house was listed on the National Register of Historic Places on March 5, 1980.

== See also ==
- National Register of Historic Places listings in northwestern Worcester, Massachusetts
- National Register of Historic Places listings in Worcester County, Massachusetts
