= John Hastings Cottage =

Historic house in Massachusetts, United States

- U.S. National Register of Historic Places
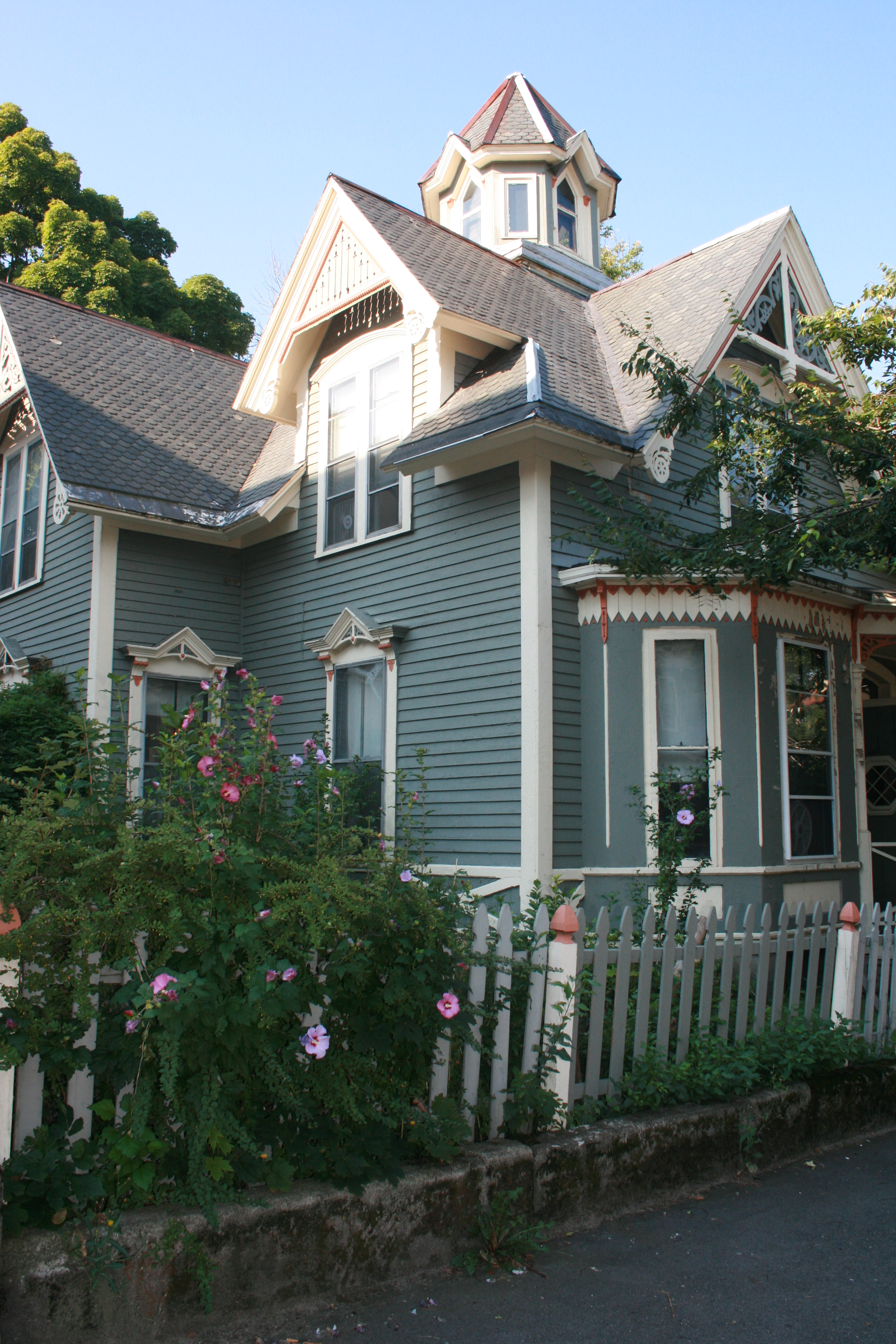

- Location within Massachusetts Location within the United States
- Location: 31 William St., Worcester, Massachusetts
- Coordinates: 42°16′1″N 71°48′28″W
- Area: less than one acre
- Built: c. 1880
- Architectural style: Gothic
- MPS: Worcester MRA
- NRHP reference No.: 80000572
- Added to NRHP: March 05, 1980

The John Hastings Cottage is an historic house at 31 William Street in Worcester, Massachusetts. Built about 1880, it is a distinctive example of Victorian Gothic architecture. The house was listed on the National Register of Historic Places in 1980, where it is misspelled as "Hastins".

== Description and history ==
The John Hastings Cottage is located in a densely built residential area west of downtown Worcester, on the north side of Williams Street just east of West Street. It is a 2 1/2-story wood-frame structure, with a clapboarded exterior and complex roof line. The roof has a number of gable ends, some of which have pierced aprons and bargeboard trim. Its porch is also elaborately decorated, and the roof sports one of the few surviving 19th century cupolas left in the city. The cupola is octagonal, with windows and paneling in alternating faces. Some of the windows of the main block are framed by gabled wooden lintels and sills with peaked gables at the center. Both the window and main gables have applied Stick style woodwork. The front facade has a projecting bay, in which the eave is adorned by decorative woodwork.

The house was built about 1880 for John Hastings, a provisioner. He owned it into the early 20th century.

== See also ==
- National Register of Historic Places listings in northwestern Worcester, Massachusetts
- National Register of Historic Places listings in Worcester County, Massachusetts
