= National Register of Historic Places listings in northwestern Worcester, Massachusetts =

There are 113 properties and historic districts on the National Register of Historic Places in Worcester, Massachusetts, west of I-190 and the north–south section of I-290 and north of Massachusetts Route 122, which are listed here. Two listings overlap into other parts of Worcester: one of the 1767 Milestones is located in eastern Worcester, and the Blackstone Canal Historic District traverses all three sections of the city.

The locations of National Register properties and districts (at least for all showing latitude and longitude coordinates below) may be seen in an online map by clicking on "Map of all coordinates".

This National Park Service list is complete through NPS recent listings posted April 3, 2026.

== Current listings ==
	Name on the Register	Image	Date listed	Location	Description
1	1767 Milestones	1767 Milestones	November 15, 1973 (#71000084)	Locations between Boston and Springfield along the old Upper Boston Post Road. 42°16′23″N 71°48′02″W	Milestone 48 is in northwestern Worcester; Milestone 47 is in eastern Worcester.
2	Abbott Street School	Abbott Street School	March 5, 1980 (#80000595)	36 Abbott St. 42°15′46″N 71°49′19″W	
3	Elwood Adams Store	Elwood Adams Store	March 5, 1980 (#80000584)	156 Main St. 42°16′06″N 71°48′04″W	
4	Charles Allen House	Charles Allen House	March 5, 1980 (#80000579)	65 Elm St. 42°15′56″N 71°48′33″W	
5	American Antiquarian Society	American Antiquarian Society	November 24, 1968 (#68000018)	185 Salisbury St. 42°16′38″N 71°48′39″W	
6	Armsby Block	Armsby Block	March 5, 1980 (#80000598)	144-148 Main St. 42°16′07″N 71°48′05″W	
7	Ash Street School	Ash Street School	March 5, 1980 (#80000542)	Ash St. 42°15′24″N 71°47′56″W	
8	Babcock Block	Babcock Block	March 5, 1980 (#80000611)	596 Main St. 42°15′37″N 71°48′18″W	
9	Bancroft Hotel	Bancroft Hotel	March 5, 1980 (#80000614)	50 Franklin St. 42°15′41″N 71°48′06″W	
10	Bancroft Tower	Bancroft Tower	March 5, 1980 (#80000524)	Bancroft Tower Rd. 42°16′56″N 71°49′28″W	
11	Emory Bannister House	Emory Bannister House	March 5, 1980 (#80000569)	3 Harvard St. 42°16′01″N 71°48′13″W	Building demolished. Now parking lot for Unum.
12	Blackstone Canal Historic District	Blackstone Canal Historic District	August 15, 1995 (#95001004)	The historic route of the Blackstone Canal in Massachusetts; 42°08′39″N 71°40′36″W	Listing extends into other parts of Worcester, as well as Sutton, Grafton, Millbury, Northbridge, Uxbridge, Millville, Blackstone; the Rhode Island section of the canal is the subject of a separate listing (#91001536).
13	Bliss Building	Bliss Building	March 5, 1980 (#80000497)	26 Old Lincoln St. 42°16′22″N 71°47′54″W	
14	Osgood Bradley Building	Osgood Bradley Building	March 5, 2018 (#100002161)	18 Grafton St. 42°15′38″N 71°47′38″W	
15	John Brooks House	John Brooks House	March 5, 1980 (#80000516)	12 Nelson Pl. 42°17′48″N 71°49′11″W	
16	Cathedral of St. Paul	Cathedral of St. Paul	March 5, 1980 (#80000604)	38 Chatham St. 42°15′42″N 71°48′17″W	
17	Chadwick Square Diner	Chadwick Square Diner	November 26, 2003 (#03001206)	95 rear Prescott St. 42°16′39″N 71°48′06″W	
18	Charles Chamberlain House	Charles Chamberlain House	March 5, 1980 (#80000596)	372 Pleasant St. 42°15′48″N 71°48′56″W	The Charles Chamberlain House was demolished in 1984. It was incorrectly listed on the National Register at 373 Pleasant Street.
19	Chamberlain-Flagg House	Chamberlain-Flagg House	March 5, 1980 (#80000519)	2 Brookshire Dr. 42°17′04″N 71°50′02″W	
20	George Cobb House	George Cobb House	March 5, 1980 (#80000571)	24 William St. 42°16′02″N 71°48′23″W	
21	Colton's Block	Colton's Block	March 5, 1980 (#80000610)	588 Main St. 42°15′38″N 71°48′17″W	
22	Samuel Copeland House	Samuel Copeland House	March 5, 1980 (#80000563)	31 Harvard St. 42°16′10″N 71°48′10″W	
23	Crompton Loom Works	Crompton Loom Works	March 5, 1980 (#80000541)	132-142 Green St. 42°15′23″N 71°47′53″W	
24	Isaac Davis House	Isaac Davis House	March 5, 1980 (#80000578)	1 Oak St. 42°15′56″N 71°48′31″W	
25	Joseph Davis House	Joseph Davis House	March 5, 1980 (#80000574)	41 Elm St. 42°15′55″N 71°48′23″W	
26	Day Building		September 13, 1978 (#09000618)	300-310 Main St. 42°15′58″N 71°48′05″W	NARA ID# 63797186
27	Frank L. and Mabel H. Dean House	Frank L. and Mabel H. Dean House	December 5, 2002 (#02001471)	10 Cedar St. 42°15′59″N 71°47′48″W	
28	Francis Dewey House	Francis Dewey House	March 5, 1980 (#80000580)	71 Elm St. 42°15′56″N 71°48′35″W	
29	Dodge Block and Sawyer Building, Bancroft Trust Building	Dodge Block and Sawyer Building, Bancroft Trust Building	March 15, 2002 (#02000155)	60 Franklin St. 42°15′41″N 71°48′06″W	
30	Helen Dodge Three-Decker	Helen Dodge Three-Decker	February 9, 1990 (#89002427)	570 Pleasant St. 42°15′53″N 71°49′21″W	
31	Thomas F. Doran Three-Decker	Thomas F. Doran Three-Decker	February 9, 1990 (#89002406)	27 John St. 42°16′05″N 71°48′23″W	
32	Elvira Drew Three-Decker	Elvira Drew Three-Decker	February 9, 1990 (#89002384)	42 Abbott St. 42°15′44″N 71°49′19″W	
33	Duprey Building	Duprey Building	September 5, 2019 (#100004336)	16 Norwich St. 42°15′51″N 71°48′03″W	
34	Elm Park	Elm Park	July 1, 1970 (#70000096)	Elm Park; 42°16′03″N 71°49′13″W	
35	Elm Street Historic District	Elm Street Historic District	February 9, 1990 (#89002374)	132-148 Elm St. 42°15′57″N 71°49′02″W	
36	English High School	English High School	March 5, 1980 (#80000601)	20 Irving St. 42°15′45″N 71°48′26″W	
37	Enterprise Building	Enterprise Building	March 5, 1980 (#80000608)	540 Main St. 42°15′40″N 71°48′15″W	
38	William Trowbridge Forbes House	William Trowbridge Forbes House	March 5, 1980 (#80000636)	23 Trowbridge St. 42°16′20″N 71°48′40″W	demolished November 2003
39	G.A.R. Hall	G.A.R. Hall	March 13, 1975 (#75000303)	55 Pearl St. 42°15′50″N 71°48′15″W	
40	George Gabriel House	George Gabriel House	March 5, 1980 (#80000523)	31 Lenox St. 42°16′39″N 71°50′02″W	
41	Gilman Block	Gilman Block	November 20, 2000 (#00001342)	207-219 Main St. 42°16′03″N 71°48′03″W	Building demolished in 2004.
42	Harry Goddard House	Harry Goddard House	March 5, 1980 (#80000525)	190 Salisbury St. 42°16′43″N 71°48′35″W	
43	Henry Goulding House	Henry Goulding House	March 5, 1980 (#80000564)	26 Harvard St. 42°16′09″N 71°48′08″W	
44	W.H. Goulding House	W.H. Goulding House	March 5, 1980 (#80000566)	4 Dix St. 42°16′10″N 71°48′12″W	
45	Gilbert Hadley Three-Decker	Gilbert Hadley Three-Decker	February 9, 1990 (#89002433)	31 Russell St. 42°15′46″N 71°48′55″W	
46	Hammond Heights	Hammond Heights	March 5, 1980 (#80000531)	Properties along Germain, Haviland, Highland, and Westland Sts. and Institute Rd. 42°16′21″N 71°49′03″W	
47	Harding-Winter Street Manufacturing District	Harding-Winter Street Manufacturing District	March 5, 1980 (#80000543)	28-88 Winter St. 42°15′30″N 71°47′42″W	
48	Harris-Merrick House	Harris-Merrick House	March 5, 1980 (#80000602)	41 Fruit St. 42°16′05″N 71°48′39″W	
49	John Hastins Cottage	John Hastins Cottage	March 5, 1980 (#80000572)	31 William St. 42°16′01″N 71°48′28″W	
50	Aldus Chapin Higgins House	Aldus Chapin Higgins House	March 5, 1980 (#80000496)	1 John Wing Rd. 42°16′31″N 71°48′33″W	
51	Marcus Hobbs House	Marcus Hobbs House	March 5, 1980 (#80000582)	16 William St. 42°16′02″N 71°48′19″W	
52	William Hogg House	William Hogg House	March 5, 1980 (#80000576)	54 Elm St. 42°15′54″N 71°48′29″W	
53	Indian Hill-North Village	Indian Hill-North Village	March 5, 1980 (#80000510)	Properties along Ararat St. and Delaval, Heroult, Marconi, Watt, and Westinghouse Rds. 42°18′47″N 71°48′45″W	
54	Indian Hill School	Indian Hill School	May 2, 2022 (#100007665)	155 Ararat St. 42°18′48″N 71°48′53″W	
55	Institutional District	Institutional District	March 5, 1980 (#80000554)	Properties on Lincoln and Wheaton Squares and on Salisbury and Tuckerman Sts. 42°16′20″N 71°48′04″W	
56	Edwin Johnson Three-Decker	Edwin Johnson Three-Decker	February 9, 1990 (#89002389)	183 Austin St. 42°15′40″N 71°49′00″W	
57	Katz and Leavitt Apartment House	Katz and Leavitt Apartment House	March 5, 1980 (#80000575)	53 Elm St. 42°15′55″N 71°48′26″W	
58	Knollwood	Knollwood	March 5, 1980 (#80000520)	425 Salisbury St. 42°17′01″N 71°49′34″W	
59	Liberty Farm	Liberty Farm	September 13, 1974 (#74002046)	116 Mower St. 42°16′50″N 71°51′36″W	
60	Lincoln Estate-Elm Park Historic District	Lincoln Estate-Elm Park Historic District	March 5, 1980 (#80000570)	Properties along Cedar, Fruit, Oak, Sever, West, and William Sts. 42°16′02″N 71°48′40″W	
61	Gov. Levi Lincoln House	Gov. Levi Lincoln House	March 5, 1980 (#80000573)	4 Avalon Pl. 42°16′00″N 71°48′26″W	
62	Lower Pleasant Street District	Lower Pleasant Street District	March 5, 1980 (#80000613)	418-426 Main St. and 9-49 Pleasant St. 42°15′49″N 71°48′12″W	
63	Main and Franklin Streets Historic District	Main and Franklin Streets Historic District	May 27, 2022 (#100007732)	Roughly bounded by Main, Franklin, Federal, Salem, and Portland Sts. 42°15′40″N 71°48′05″W	
64	Jerome Marble House	Jerome Marble House	March 5, 1980 (#80000567)	23 Harvard St. 42°16′06″N 71°48′11″W	
65	Alexander Marsh House	Alexander Marsh House	March 5, 1980 (#80000583)	57 Elm St. 42°15′56″N 71°48′29″W	
66	Massachusetts Avenue Historic District	Massachusetts Avenue Historic District	December 16, 1971 (#71000356)	Between Salisbury St. and Drury Lane; 42°16′42″N 71°48′44″W	
67	William McFarland House	William McFarland House	March 5, 1980 (#80000517)	525 Salisbury St. 42°17′24″N 71°49′54″W	
68	James McPartland Three-Decker	James McPartland Three-Decker	February 9, 1990 (#89002428)	17 Pond St. 42°15′26″N 71°47′51″W	
69	Mechanics Hall	Mechanics Hall	November 9, 1972 (#72000152)	321 Main St. 42°15′57″N 71°48′07″W	
70	Mechanics' Hall District	Mechanics' Hall District	March 5, 1980 (#80000577)	282-343 Main St. 42°15′56″N 71°48′08″W	
71	Merrill Double House	Merrill Double House	March 5, 1980 (#80000581)	18-20 West St. 42°15′53″N 71°48′36″W	
72	Mission Chapel	Mission Chapel	March 5, 1980 (#80000616)	205 Summer St. 42°15′48″N 71°47′44″W	
73	Montvale	Montvale	March 5, 1980 (#80000521)	Properties along Montvale, Monadnock, Sagamore, Waconah, and Whitman Rds., and Salisbury St. 42°16′52″N 71°48′43″W	
74	Charles Newton House	Charles Newton House	March 5, 1980 (#80000508)	24 Brattle St. 42°18′53″N 71°49′06″W	
75	North Worcester Aid Society	North Worcester Aid Society	March 5, 1980 (#80000512)	58 Holden St. 42°17′59″N 71°49′04″W	
76	Old State Mutual Building	Old State Mutual Building	March 5, 1980 (#80000585)	240 Main St. 42°16′02″N 71°48′06″W	
77	Oxford-Crown Historic District	Oxford-Crown Historic District	May 6, 1976 (#76000954)	Roughly bounded by Chatham, Congress, Crown, Pleasant, Oxford Sts. and Oxford Pl.; also properties along Ashland, Austin, Chatham, Congress, Crown, and Pleasant Sts. 42°15′54″N 71°48′30″W	Second set of boundaries represents a boundary increase of March 5, 1980, the Oxford-Crown Extension District
78	Park Building	Park Building	March 5, 1980 (#80000607)	507 Main St. 42°15′43″N 71°48′11″W	
79	Pleasant Street Firehouse	Pleasant Street Firehouse	March 5, 1980 (#80000597)	408 Pleasant St. 42°15′48″N 71°48′59″W	
80	Poli's Palace Theater	Poli's Palace Theater	January 10, 2011 (#10001122)	2 Southbridge St. 42°15′41″N 71°48′12″W	
81	The Printers Building	The Printers Building	August 28, 2020 (#100005478)	44-50 Portland St. 42°15′36″N 71°48′08″W	
82	Otis Putnam House	Otis Putnam House	March 5, 1980 (#80000565)	25 Harvard St. 42°16′08″N 71°48′11″W	
83	Tilley Raymond House	Tilley Raymond House	March 5, 1980 (#80000568)	12 George St. 42°16′06″N 71°48′08″W	
84	Willard Richmond Apartment Block	Willard Richmond Apartment Block	November 7, 1985 (#85002783)	43 Austin St. 42°15′38″N 71°48′24″W	
85	B. E. Ridyard Three-Decker	B. E. Ridyard Three-Decker	February 9, 1990 (#89002402)	29 Dewey St. 42°15′44″N 71°49′12″W	
86	John Riordan Three-Decker	John Riordan Three-Decker	February 9, 1990 (#89002405)	8 Dix St. 42°16′10″N 71°48′14″W	
87	Robinson and Swan Blocks (Note: Procedural confusion around the listing of the Robinson and Swan Blocks, documented in National Archives file #63792971, appears to have inadvertently resulted in the omission of the property from subsequent database sources at the federal level.)	Robinson and Swan Blocks	March 5, 1980 (#16000208)	104–108 Pleasant St. and 1–3 Irving St. 42°15′49″N 71°48′21″W	
88	The Russell	The Russell	November 7, 1985 (#85002782)	49 Austin St. 42°15′39″N 71°48′24″W	
89	St. John's Catholic Church	St. John's Catholic Church	March 5, 1980 (#80000619)	40 Temple St. 42°15′35″N 71°47′49″W	
90	Saint Joseph's Home for Working Girls	Saint Joseph's Home for Working Girls	August 4, 2021 (#100006777)	52 High St. 42°15′40″N 71°48′17″W	
91	Salisbury Factory Building	Salisbury Factory Building	March 5, 1980 (#80000588)	49-51 Union St. 42°16′12″N 71°47′54″W	
92	Salisbury Factory Building	Salisbury Factory Building	March 5, 1980 (#80000587)	25 Union St. 42°16′12″N 71°47′55″W	
93	Salisbury House	Salisbury House	June 10, 1975 (#75000837)	61 Harvard St. 42°16′19″N 71°48′08″W	
94	Salisbury Mansion and Store	Salisbury Mansion and Store	May 30, 1975 (#75000838)	30, 40 Highland St. 42°16′19″N 71°48′10″W	
95	Slater Building	Slater Building	March 5, 1980 (#80000609)	390 Main St. 42°15′51″N 71°48′09″W	
96	Smith-Thaxter-Merrifield House	Smith-Thaxter-Merrifield House	March 5, 1980 (#80000509)	158 Holden St. 42°18′45″N 71°49′08″W	
97	Stevens' Building	Stevens' Building	March 5, 1980 (#80000615)	24-44 Southbridge St. 42°15′37″N 71°48′13″W	
98	Thule-Plummer Buildings	Thule-Plummer Buildings	February 18, 2011 (#11000019)	180 and 184 Main St. 42°16′06″N 71°48′05″W	
99	Horatio Tower House	Horatio Tower House	March 5, 1980 (#80000600)	71 Pleasant St. 42°15′49″N 71°48′19″W	
100	Union Congregational Church	Union Congregational Church	March 5, 1980 (#80000599)	5 Chestnut St. 42°15′51″N 71°48′19″W	
101	U.S. Post Office and Courthouse	U.S. Post Office and Courthouse	April 8, 2011 (#11000161)	595 Main St. 42°15′38″N 71°48′14″W	Now known as the Harold D. Donohue Federal Building and United States Courthouse
102	Union Station	Union Station	March 5, 1980 (#80000617)	Washington Sq. 42°15′40″N 71°47′44″W	
103	Waldo Street Police Station	Waldo Street Police Station	March 5, 1980 (#80000586)	Waldo St. 42°15′56″N 71°48′00″W	
104	Washburn and Moen North Works District	Washburn and Moen North Works District	March 5, 1980 (#80000439)	Properties on Grove St. 42°16′36″N 71°48′04″W	
105	WCIS Bank	WCIS Bank	March 5, 1980 (#80000606)	365 Main St. 42°15′53″N 71°48′07″W	
106	John Wescott Three-Decker	John Wescott Three-Decker	February 9, 1990 (#89002426)	454 Pleasant St. 42°15′48″N 71°49′05″W	
107	Whitcomb House	Whitcomb House	November 9, 1977 (#77000653)	51 Harvard St. 42°16′16″N 71°48′09″W	Duplicate listing for Whitcomb Mansion.
108	Whitcomb Mansion	Whitcomb Mansion	March 5, 1980 (#80000499)	51 Harvard St.	Duplicate listing for Whitcomb House.
109	Worcester City Hall and Common	Worcester City Hall and Common	March 29, 1978 (#78001405)	455 Main St. 42°15′44″N 71°48′06″W	
110	Worcester County Courthouse	Worcester County Courthouse	December 20, 2021 (#100007236)	2 Main St. 42°16′15″N 71°48′00″W	
111	Worcester Five Cents Savings Bank	Worcester Five Cents Savings Bank	September 13, 1978 (#78000472)	316 Main St. 42°15′57″N 71°48′08″W	
112	Worcester Young Women's Christian Association		August 22, 2023 (#100009287)	6 Chatham St. 42°15′43″N 71°48′14″W	The YWCA's former site, now residential
113	YWCA of Worcester	YWCA of Worcester	February 3, 2022 (#100007389)	2 YWCA Way; 42°15′36″N 71°47′59″W	The current YWCA campus

== Former listing ==
	Name on the Register	Image	Date listed	Date removed	Location	Description
1	Foster Block		July 17, 1972 (#72001596)	October 30, 1972	404-406 Main Street	Demolished

== See also ==
- National Register of Historic Places listings in Worcester, Massachusetts
- National Register of Historic Places listings in southwestern Worcester, Massachusetts
- National Register of Historic Places listings in eastern Worcester, Massachusetts
- National Register of Historic Places listings in Worcester County, Massachusetts
