= B. E. Ridyard Three-Decker =

- U.S. National Register of Historic Places
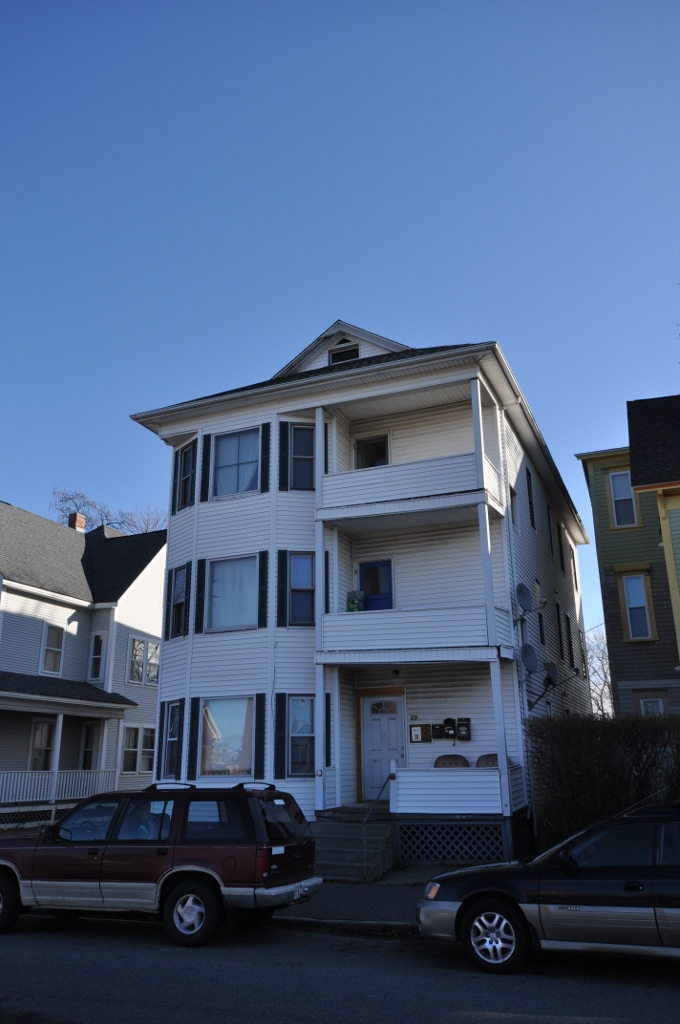

- Location within Massachusetts Location within the United States
- Location: 29 Dewey St., Worcester, Massachusetts
- Coordinates: 42°15′44″N 71°49′12″W
- Built: 1910
- Architectural style: Queen Anne
- MPS: Worcester Three-Deckers TR
- NRHP reference No.: 89002402
- Added to NRHP: February 9, 1990

The B. E. Ridyard Three-Decker is a historic Three-decker house in Worcester, Massachusetts. When the c. 1910 house was listed on the National Register of Historic Places in 1990, it was noted for its Queen Anne styling, included bands of colored shingling on the front bays, and decorative wood work on the porches. Since then, the house has been resided, and the porch details have been removed or covered over (see photo). The area where it was built was at the outer edge of residential development west of downtown during the late 19th and early 20th centuries.

== See also ==
- National Register of Historic Places listings in northwestern Worcester, Massachusetts
- National Register of Historic Places listings in Worcester County, Massachusetts
