= Francis Dewey House =

Historic house in Massachusetts, United States

- U.S. National Register of Historic Places
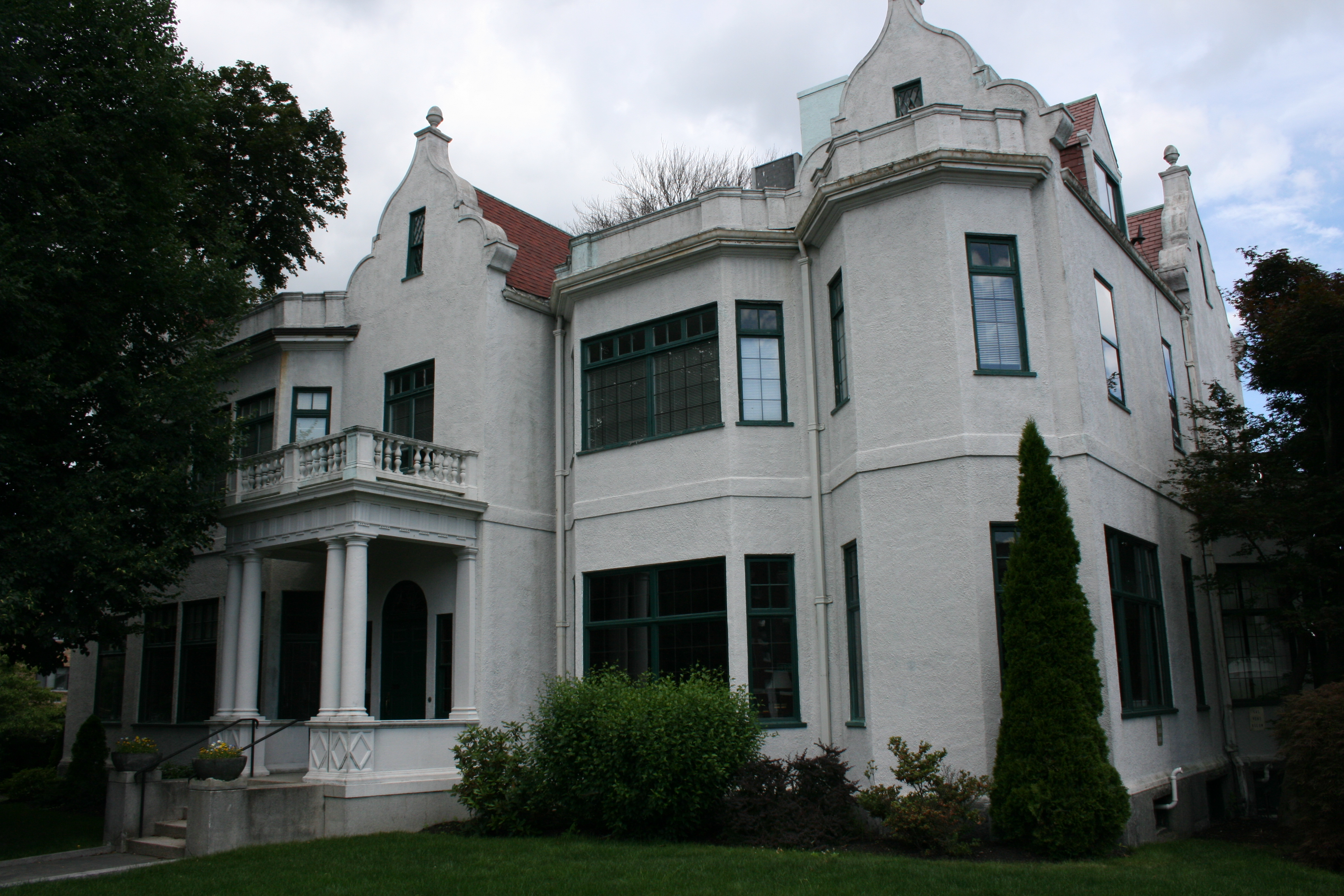

- Location within Massachusetts Location within the United States
- Location: 71 Elm St., Worcester, Massachusetts
- Coordinates: 42°15′56″N 71°48′35″W
- Built: 1912
- Architect: Little & Browne
- Architectural style: Flemish/Eclectic
- MPS: Worcester MRA
- NRHP reference No.: 80000580
- Added to NRHP: March 05, 1980

The Francis Dewey House is a historic house at 71 Elm Street in Worcester, Massachusetts. Built in 1912, it is locally distinctive for its architecturally eclectic design by the Boston firm of Little & Browne. The house was listed on the National Register of Historic Places in 1980. Its owner, Francis H. Dewey, was a prominent lawyer and businessman. He was the fourth generation of his family in the legal profession, and served as a judge and railroad company executive.

== Description and history ==
The Dewey House is located in a residential area west of downtown Worcester, at the northwest corner of Elm and West Streets. It is a 2 1/2-story wood-frame structure, with its exterior clad in stucco. It is architecturally distinctive, with curving Flemish wall gables rising to urned tops at various points on each facade. The front, facing south, is basically symmetrical, with five sections, the central one projecting slightly. It and the outer sections are topped by the Flemish gables, and all four sections other than the center have two-story polygonal projections. The center section has the main entrance, sheltered by a porch of cast stone with Tuscan columns, entablature, and upper balustrade.

The house was built in 1912 to one of three designs submitted to Francis Dewey. They all had a similar footprint, suggesting the structure may incorporate elements of the older (c. 1860) house that had been standing on the property. The selected design was in an eclectic Flemish style; the rejected designs were in Colonial Revival and English Revival (Tudor) styles.

== See also ==
- National Register of Historic Places listings in northwestern Worcester, Massachusetts
- National Register of Historic Places listings in Worcester County, Massachusetts
