= Elvira Drew Three-Decker =

Historic building in Massachusetts, US

- U.S. National Register of Historic Places
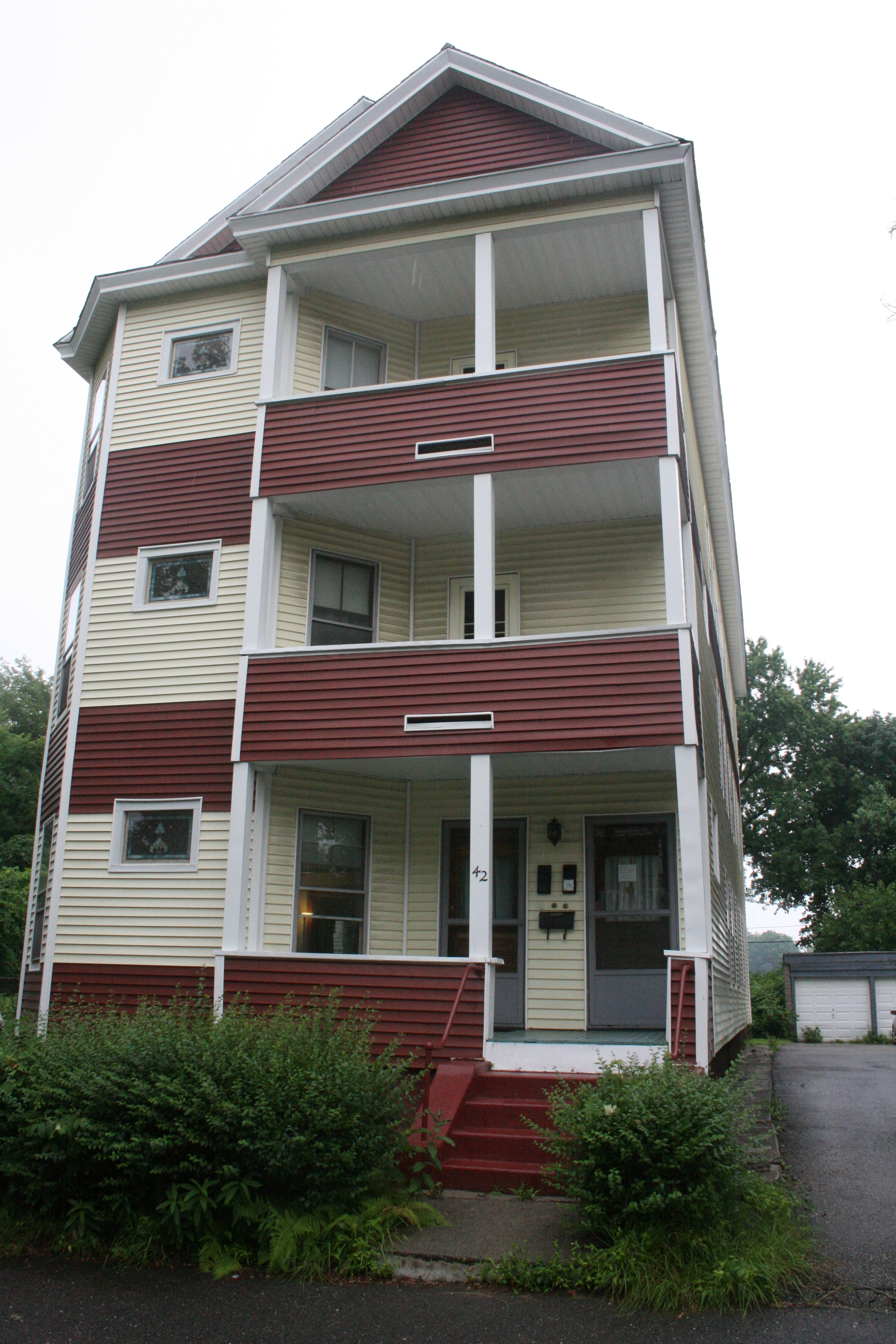

- Location within Massachusetts Location within the United States
- Location: 42 Abbott St., Worcester, Massachusetts
- Coordinates: 42°15′44″N 71°49′19″W
- Area: less than one acre
- Built: c. 1904
- Architectural style: Colonial Revival
- MPS: Worcester Three-Deckers TR
- NRHP reference No.: 89002384
- Added to NRHP: February 9, 1990

The Elvira Drew Three-Decker is an historic three-decker in Worcester, Massachusetts. Built c. 1904, it represents part of a trend of building the form, traditionally associated with working-class housing, into the fashionable west side of the city. The house was listed on the National Register of Historic Places in 1990, but its historic integrity has been compromised by the application of modern siding.

== Description and history ==
The Elvira Drew Three-Decker is located in a densely built residential area west of downtown Worcester, on the west side of Abbott Street near its southern end. It is a three-story wood-frame structure, with a gabled roof and exterior now finished in modern siding. The front facade has a projecting window bay on the left, and a three-story porch stack on the right, whose porches extend beyond the left bay. When the house was listed on the National Register of Historic Places in 1990, exterior Colonial Revival details were highlighted, including brackets in the eaves and porch columns that were Tuscan columns. Many of these details have subsequently been lost or covered over (see photo).

The house was built about 1904, after streetcar service had been introduced on nearby Chandler Street. Introduction of that service prompted a wave of three-decker development on the city's otherwise fashionable upper-class west side, and those built tended to attract white-collar workers employed downtown. Nothing is known of Elvira Drew, its first owner who was apparently absentee; its early tenants included accountants, clerks, stenographers, and salesmen.

== See also ==
- National Register of Historic Places listings in northwestern Worcester, Massachusetts
- National Register of Historic Places listings in Worcester County, Massachusetts
