= Pleasant Street Firehouse =

- U.S. National Register of Historic Places
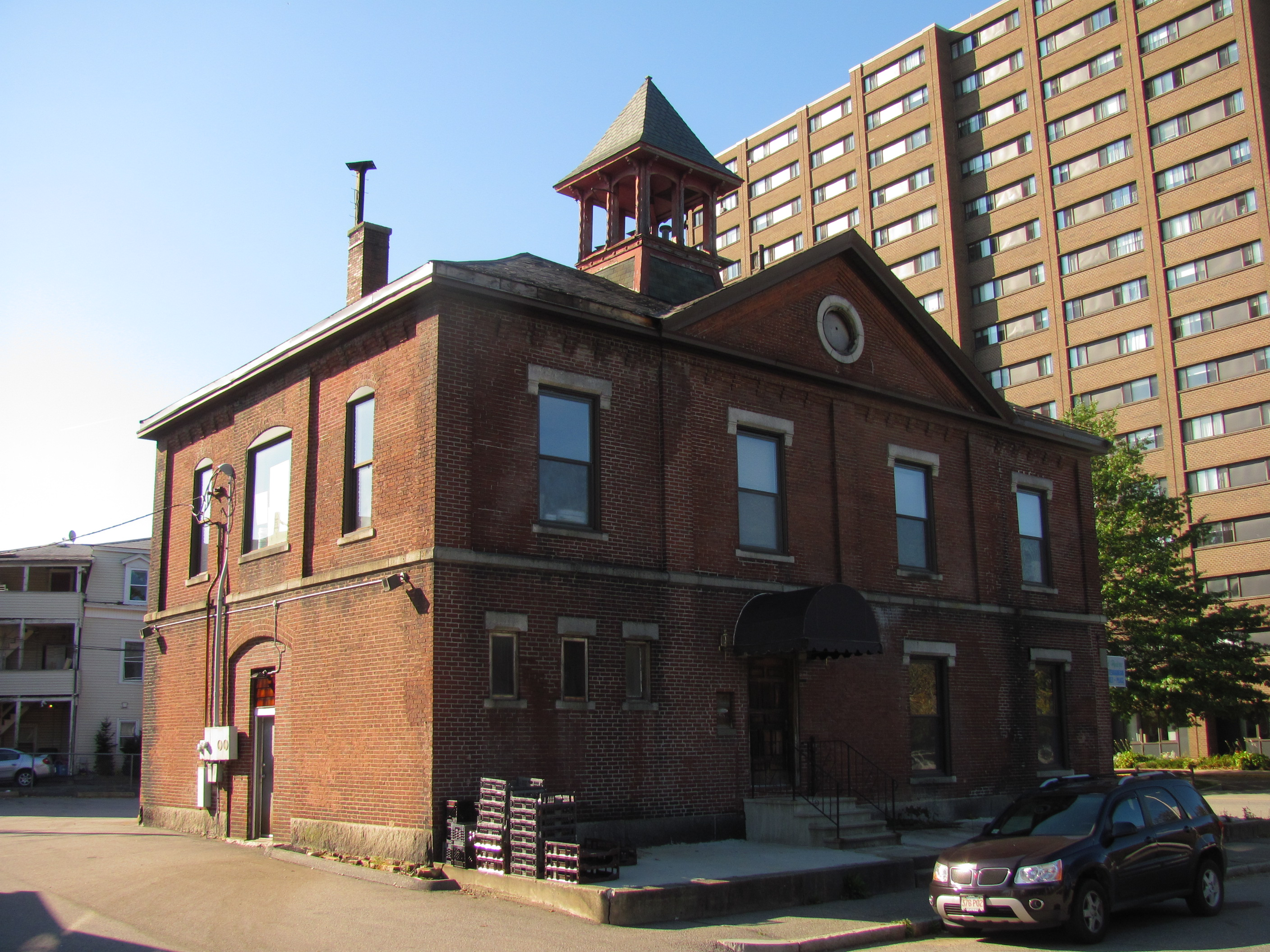
- Pleasant Street Firehouse

- Location within Massachusetts Location within the United States
- Location: 408 Pleasant St., Worcester, Massachusetts
- Coordinates: 42°15′48″N 71°48′59″W
- Built: 1873
- Architectural style: Late Victorian
- MPS: Worcester MRA
- NRHP reference No.: 80000597
- Added to NRHP: March 05, 1980

The Pleasant Street Firehouse is an historic former firehouse at 408 Pleasant Street in Worcester, Massachusetts. One of three fire stations built by the city in 1873, it was Worcester's oldest active firehouse when it was listed on the National Register of Historic Places in 1980. It has since been converted to commercial retail use.

== Description and history ==
The former Pleasant Street Firehouse stands in a mixed residential-commercial area west of downtown Worcester, at the southwest corner of Pleasant and Winslow Streets. It is a two-story brick building, with a hip roof topped by an open cupola, and a pedimented gable with oriel window atop the center section of the main (north-facing) facade. There are three equipment bays on the ground floor, all of which have been enclosed with wood frame walls clad in shingles. The outer bays each have a door in them, that on the right also with a plate glass window to the right. Two similar glass windows are found in the central bay. Windows in the second floor are topped by eared granite lintels.

The city built this firehouse in 1873-74 on land purchased from Daniel Waldo Lincoln, a prominent local landowner. Its architect is unknown; although the city paid the local firm of Earle and Fuller for design services related to fire stations in 1873, the building is stylistically different from the other firehouses built at the time. It is somewhat curiously retardaire in style, with the cupola and projecting side pavilion more reminiscent of earlier Federal and Greek Revival styles than the then-current Second Empire and Renaissance styles. Since its listing on the National Register in 1980, the city closed and sold the building, and it has been converted to commercial use.

== See also ==
- National Register of Historic Places listings in northwestern Worcester, Massachusetts
- National Register of Historic Places listings in Worcester County, Massachusetts
