= Smith-Thaxter-Merrifield House =

Historic house in Massachusetts, United States

- U.S. National Register of Historic Places
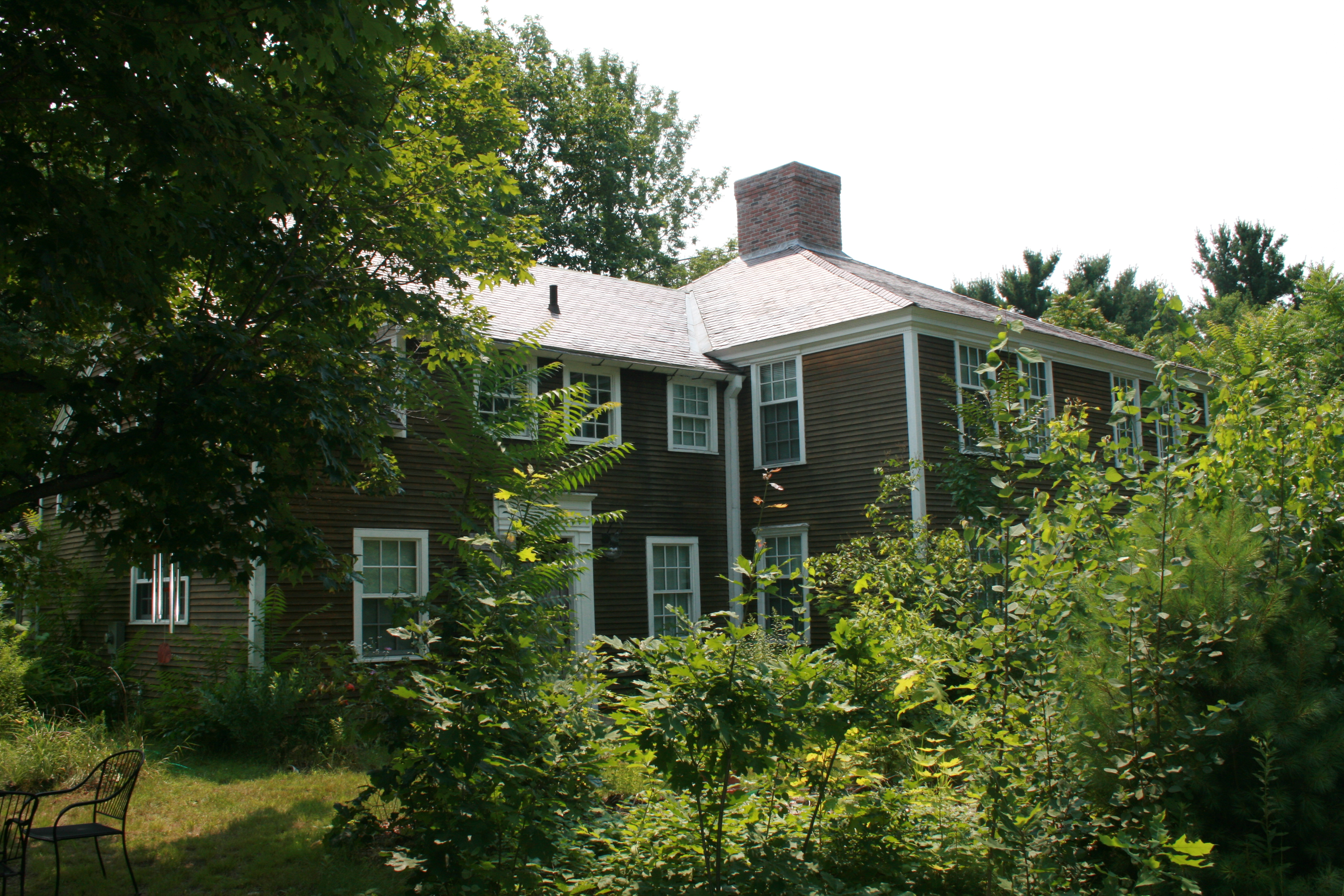

- Location within Massachusetts Location within the United States
- Location: 158 Holden St., Worcester, Massachusetts
- Coordinates: 42°18′45″N 71°49′8″W
- Built: 1741
- Architectural style: timber-frame vernacular
- MPS: Worcester MRA
- NRHP reference No.: 80000509
- Added to NRHP: March 05, 1980

The Smith-Thaxter-Merrifield House is an historic house at 158 Holden Street in Worcester, Massachusetts. Built c. 1741 and probably altered in the late 18th century, it is one of the oldest houses in the city, and has only undergone minimal alteration. It is also a rare local example of a hip-roof central-chimney house. It was listed on the National Register of Historic Places in 1980.

== Description and history ==
The Smith-Thaxter-Merrifield House is located in suburban northern Worcester, at the southeast corner of Holden Street and Stetson Road. It is a two-story hip roof timber-frame house, with a five bay facade, massive central chimney, and clapboard siding. The original south-facing facade is symmetrical, with a central entry flanked by pilasters and topped by a dentillated cornice. A two-story ell extends to the rear of the house (toward Stetson Road).

The oldest portion of the house was probably built by Elisha Smith II not long after his arrival in the area, from Weston in 1741. He sold it to Benjamin Thaxter later in the 18th century, who probably enlarged it, adding the hip roof and the entrance surround. In 1849 the property was purchased by Deacon Alpheus Merrifield, and in 1866 it was acquired by James Libby. About 1915, Libby's heirs sold it to the Norton Company. Its only known subsequent alterations are the replacement of windows, in the early 20th century. At the time of its listing on the National Register in 1980, it was being used as child care facility, a role it had served since 1946. This type of house was fairly typical in Worcester in the late 18th and early 19th century; there are only three such houses left.

== See also ==
- National Register of Historic Places listings in northwestern Worcester, Massachusetts
- National Register of Historic Places listings in Worcester County, Massachusetts
