= Saint Joseph's Home for Working Girls =

- U.S. National Register of Historic Places
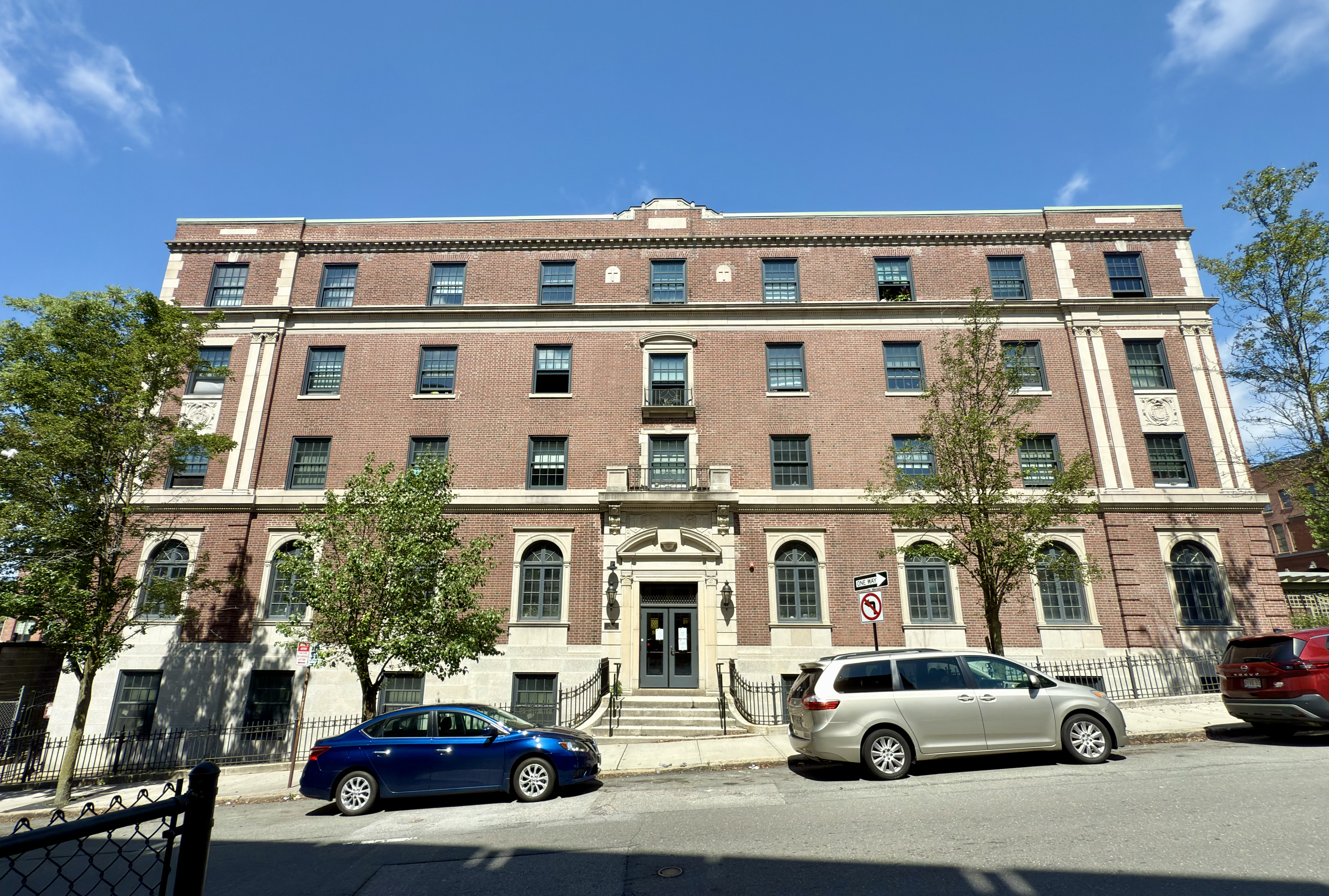

- Location within Massachusetts Location within the United States
- Location: 52 High St. Worcester, Massachusetts
- Coordinates: 42°15′40″N 71°48′17″W
- Area: less than one acre
- Built: 1924
- Architect: Edward Fitzgerald
- Architectural style: Georgian Revival
- NRHP reference No.: 100006777
- Added to NRHP: August 4, 2021

The Saint Joseph's Home for Working Girls is an historic social services building at 52 High Street in downtown Worcester, Massachusetts. Completed in 1924, it was operated for many years as a home for needy women by the Sisters of Mercy. Since 2009 it has been home to Abby's House, which continues the same mission. The building, designed by Edward Fitzgerald, was listed on the National Register of Historic Places in 2021.

== Description and history ==
The former Saint Joseph's Home for Working Girls is located southwest of Worcester's central common, on the west side of High Street between Austin and Chatham Streets. It is located near the Roman Catholic Cathedral of Saint Paul, a parish with which it was historically associated. The building is a five-story masonry structure, finished in brick and stone in the Georgial Revival style. A utilitarian annex extends west from the main block. The building is noted architecturally for its little-altered exterior, and its well-preserved interior features.

The Sisters of Mercy, an Irish Catholic religious order founded in 1831, established the Saint Joseph's Home in 1895, operating from tenement houses on this site in which they had operated an orphanage since 1875. In 1924, the tenement houses were demolished and the present edifice constructed. It was designed by Edward Fitzgerald, who also designed other buildings for the Roman Catholic church in Worcester. The Sisters operated the facility until June 2009, when it was sold to the Abby Kelley Foster House, Inc., which continues to operate it as a women's shelter.

== See also ==
- National Register of Historic Places listings in northwestern Worcester, Massachusetts
- National Register of Historic Places listings in Worcester County, Massachusetts
