= Merrill Double House =

Historic house in Massachusetts, United States

- U.S. National Register of Historic Places
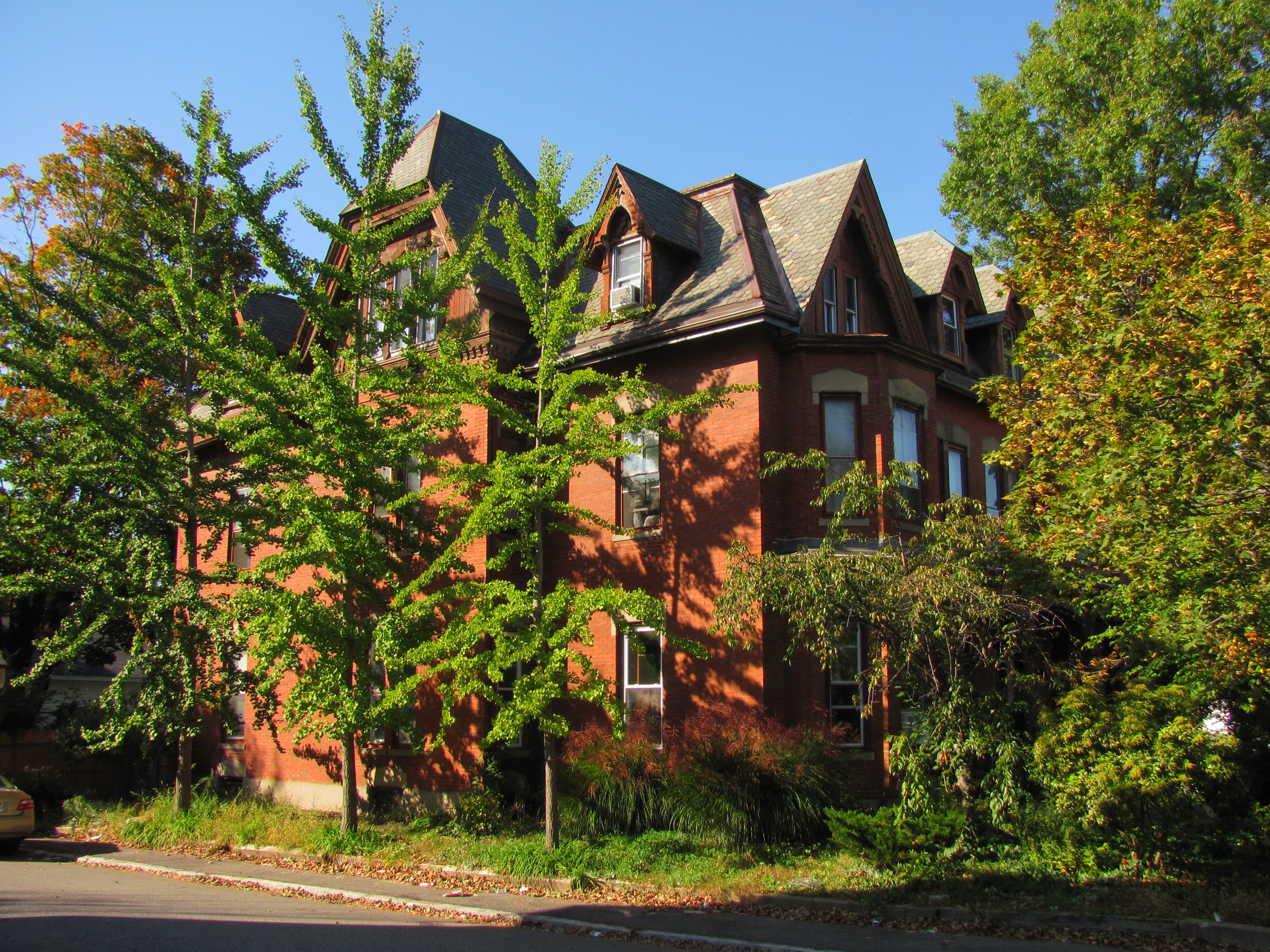
- Merrill Double House

- Location within Massachusetts Location within the United States
- Location: 18-20 West St., Worcester, Massachusetts
- Coordinates: 42°15′53″N 71°48′36″W
- Built: 1879
- Architectural style: Gothic
- MPS: Worcester MRA
- NRHP reference No.: 80000581
- Added to NRHP: March 05, 1980

The Merrill Double House is an historic two family house at 18-20 West Street in Worcester, Massachusetts. The 2 1/2-story Victorian Gothic Revival brick building was built c. 1879, apparently by the heirs of a local shopowner, Enoch Merrill, whose house had previously stood on the lot. The two units are symmetrically laid out on either side of a common party wall. The center of the main facade includes a porch that shelters the paired entrances, and each side facade includes a pavilion that rises a full three stories with a steeply pitched roof.

The house was listed on the National Register of Historic Places in 1980.

== See also ==
- National Register of Historic Places listings in northwestern Worcester, Massachusetts
- National Register of Historic Places listings in Worcester County, Massachusetts
