= George Cobb House =

Historic house in Massachusetts, United States

- U.S. National Register of Historic Places
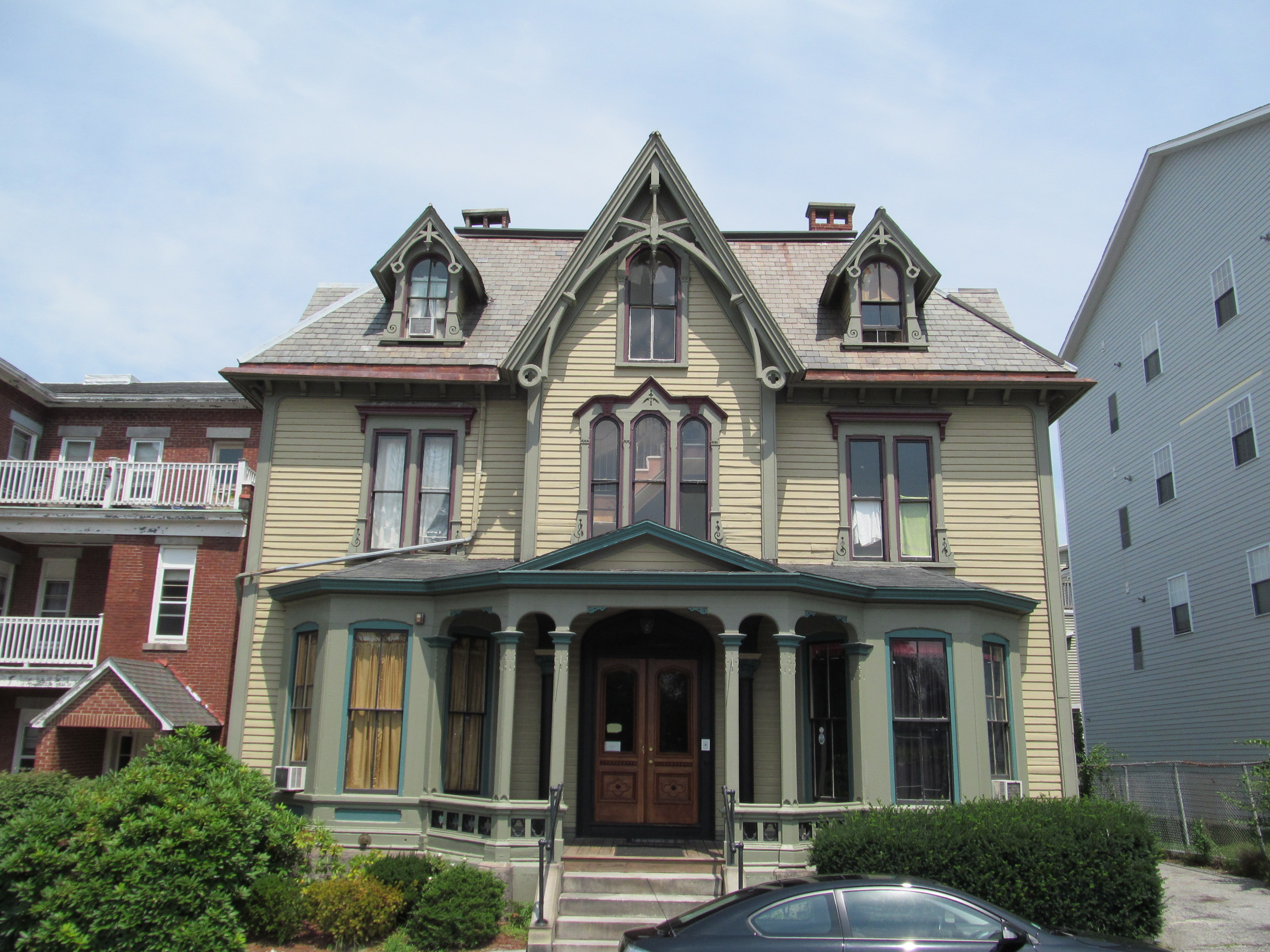

- Location within Massachusetts Location within the United States
- Location: 24 William Street, Worcester, Massachusetts
- Coordinates: 42°16′2″N 71°48′23″W
- Built: 1875
- Architectural style: Gothic Revival
- MPS: Worcester MRA
- NRHP reference No.: 80000571
- Added to NRHP: March 05, 1980

The George Cobb House is a historic house located at 24 William Street in Worcester, Massachusetts. Built about 1875, it is a well-preserved and little-altered example of late Gothic Revival architecture. The house was listed on the National Register of Historic Places on March 5, 1980.

== Description and history ==
The house is set in a predominantly residential area just west of Worcester's central business district, on the north side of William Street. It is a 2 1/2-story wood-frame house, with a slate hip roof, slightly projecting central gabled pavilion, clapboard siding, and a granite foundation. Its front facade, facing south, is three bays wide, with single-story polygonal bay windows flanking the entrance. The entrance, set in the projecting pavilion, is sheltered by a porch that extends between the near corners of the flanking bays, with supporting square columns, arched openings, and a low balustrade. On the second level, a three-part round-arch window is set above the entrance under a stylized cap. The gable of the projecting section has Stick style bargeboard, and is flanked at the roof level by gabled dormers with a simplified version of the same decoration. Windows on the side elevations have bracketed sills and lintels, with the first-floor lintels capped by gabled cornices, and those on the second floor flat. A two-story polygonal bay projects from the right side, just below a steeply pitched gable.

The house was built about 1875, and was first occupied by George Cobb, a fish and oyster merchant.

== See also ==
- National Register of Historic Places listings in northwestern Worcester, Massachusetts
- National Register of Historic Places listings in Worcester County, Massachusetts
