= Gilbert Hadley Three-Decker =

- U.S. National Register of Historic Places
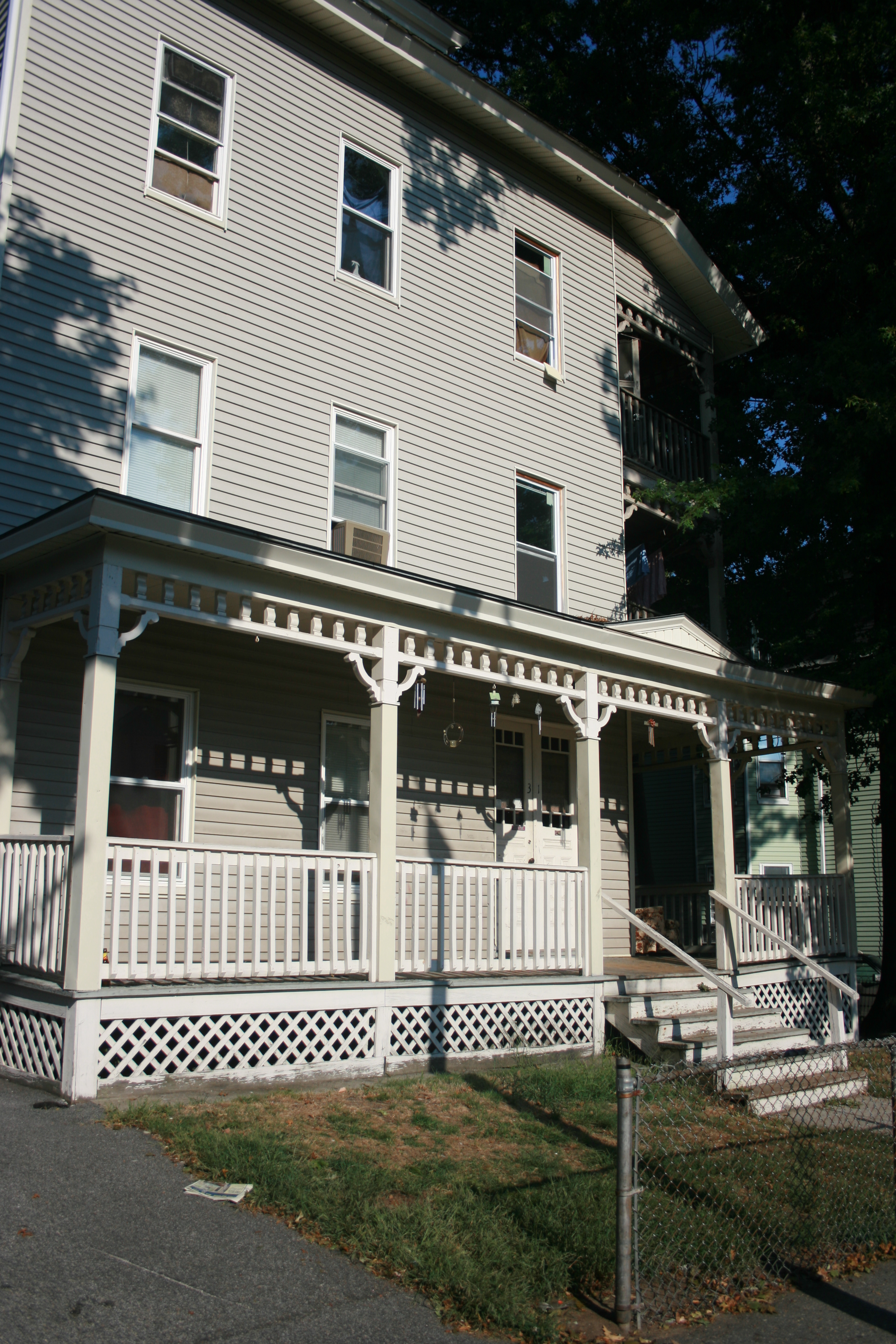
- Gilbert Hadley Three-Decker

- Location within Massachusetts Location within the United States
- Location: 31 Russell St., Worcester, Massachusetts
- Coordinates: 42°15′46″N 71°48′55″W
- Area: less than one acre
- Built: c. 1888
- Architectural style: Stick/Eastlake
- MPS: Worcester Three-Deckers TR
- NRHP reference No.: 89002433
- Added to NRHP: February 9, 1990

The Gilbert Hadley Three-Decker is a historic three-decker in Worcester, Massachusetts. Built in 1888, it is a well-preserved example of the form with Stick-style architecture, with a distinctive arrangement of porches. The house was listed on the National Register of Historic Places in 1990.

== Description and history ==
The Gilbert Hadley Three-Decker stands on a residential street west of downtown Worcester, on the west side of Russell Street between Pleasant and Larch Streets. It is a three-story wood frame structure, with a hip roof and clapboarded exterior. Its main facade is three bays wide, with the main entrance in the rightmost bay. A single-story porch extends across the front and wraps around to the right side, and is elaborately finished, with spindled friezes, chamfered posts, and decorative brackets. The side elevation of the porch is topped by balconies on the second and third floors. On the left side of the building, there is a rectangular projecting jog near the center of the facade, behind which a porch extends to the side.

The area where this house stands was developed as a residential area in the 1880s, and this house was probably built in 1888. The builders may have been the Hadley Brothers, whose principals, Herman and Gilbert Hadley, occupied units in this house and an adjacent one. Early tenants of the building included skilled workers such as bookkeepers, clerks, and teachers, as well as a policeman and an insurance agent.

== See also ==
- National Register of Historic Places listings in northwestern Worcester, Massachusetts
- National Register of Historic Places listings in Worcester County, Massachusetts
