= Mission Chapel =

Historic church in Massachusetts, United States

- U.S. National Register of Historic Places
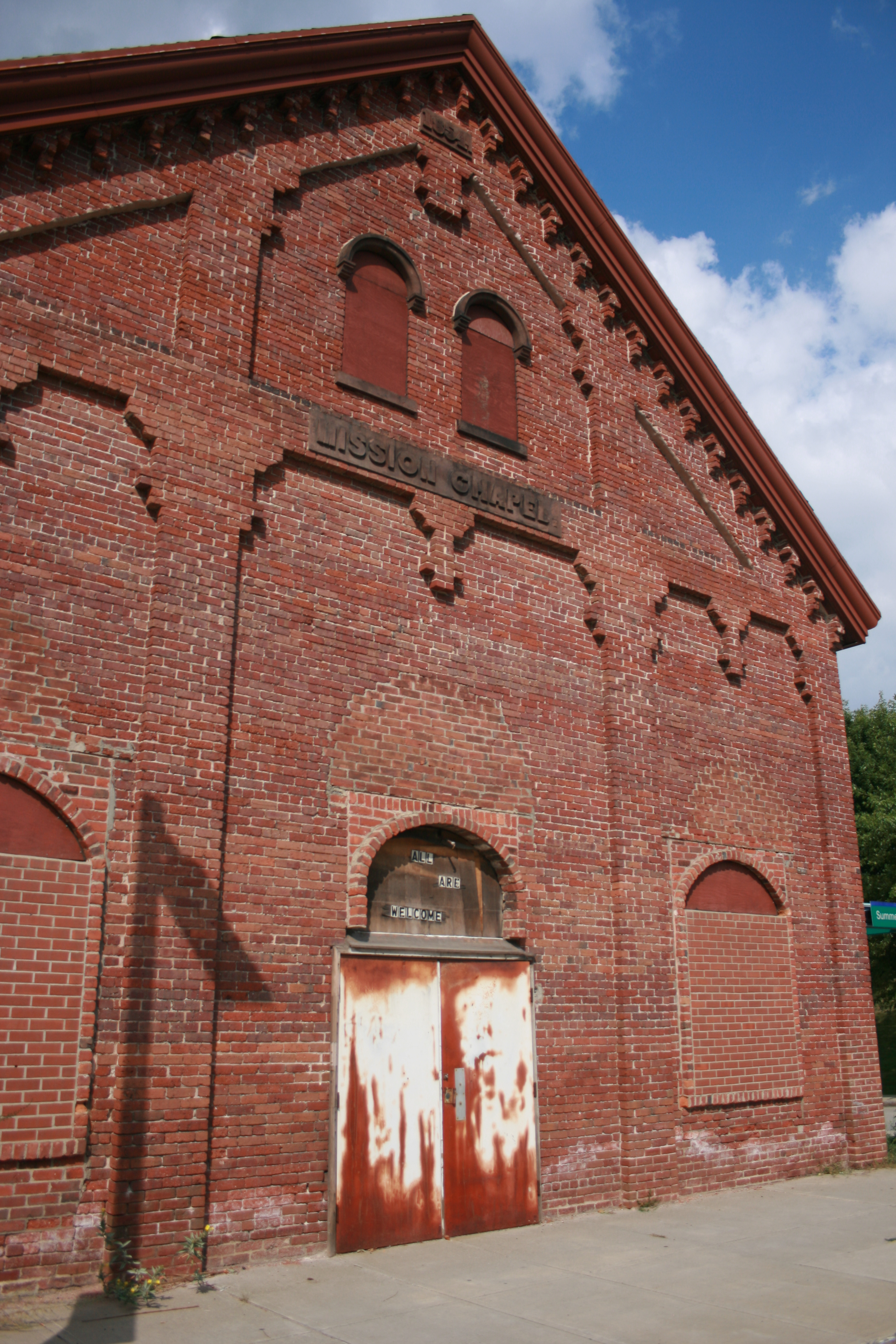

- Location within Massachusetts Location within the United States
- Location: 205 Summer St., Worcester, Massachusetts
- Coordinates: 42°15′48″N 71°47′44″W
- Built: 1854
- Architect: Ichabod Washburn
- Architectural style: Italianate
- MPS: Worcester MRA
- NRHP reference No.: 80000616
- Added to NRHP: March 5, 1980

The Mission Chapel is an historic church in Worcester, Massachusetts. A rare example of the early Victorian Norman (or "Romanesque in panel") styling, it was built by Ichabod Washburn in 1854, and is one of the city's oldest church buildings. The exterior side walls are divided into bays separated by piers which rise to a layer of corbelling, with a second layer of corbelling just below the eave. The main facade is divided into three bays, with arched windows in the gable. The Evangelical City Missionary Society, for whom the chapel was built, was established by a group of local Protestant congregations as a missionary site for serving the city's poor and needy. The building was rented out for commercial purposes during the mid-20th century, but has otherwise been used for religious and missionary purposes.

The chapel was listed on the National Register of Historic Places in 1980.

== See also ==
- National Register of Historic Places listings in northwestern Worcester, Massachusetts
- National Register of Historic Places listings in Worcester County, Massachusetts
