= Thomas F. Doran Three-Decker =

- U.S. National Register of Historic Places
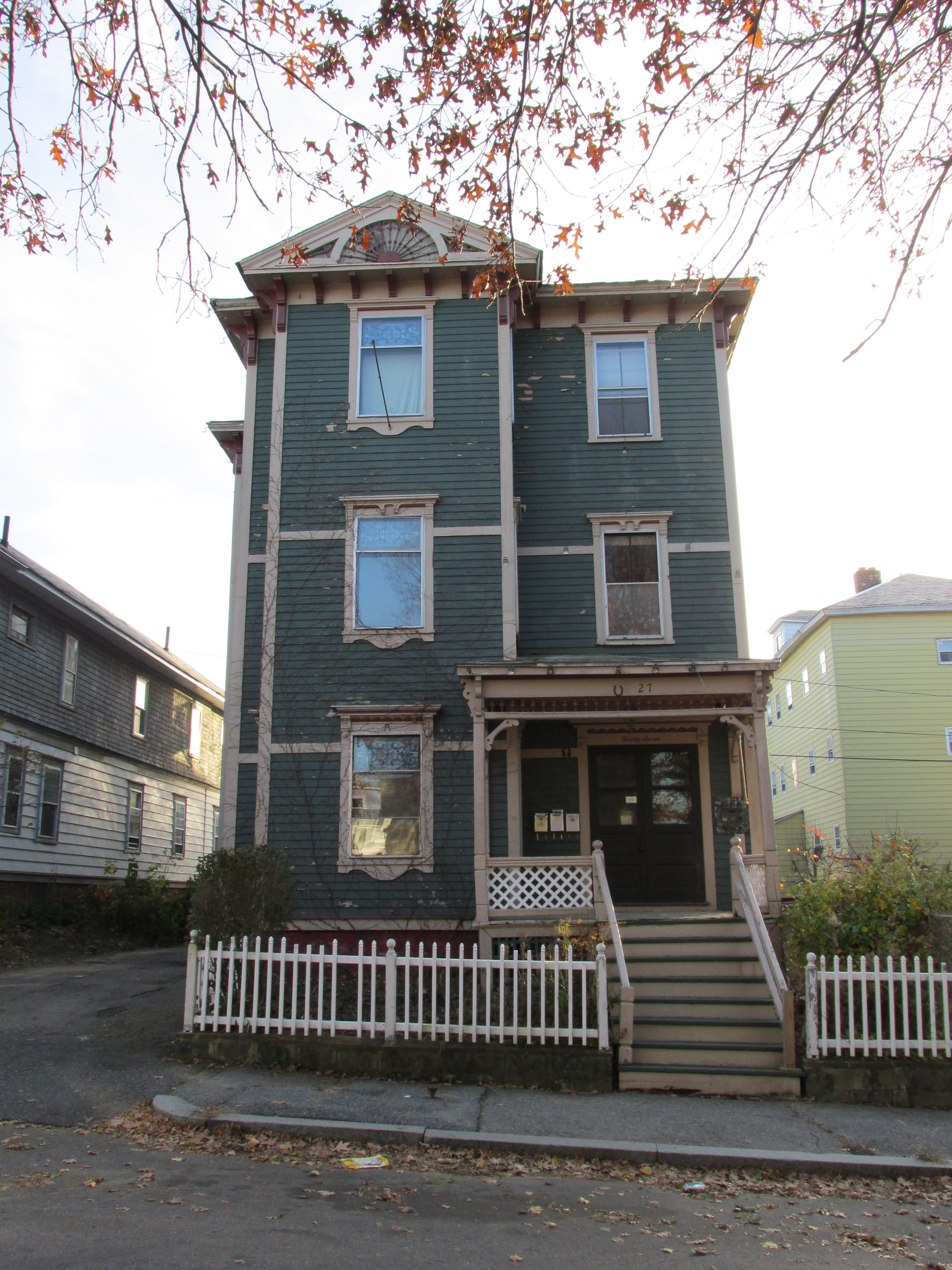
- 27 John Street

- Location within Massachusetts Location within the United States
- Location: 27 John St., Worcester, Massachusetts
- Coordinates: 42°16′5″N 71°48′23″W
- Area: less than one acre
- Built: c. 1894
- Architectural style: Stick/Eastlake
- MPS: Worcester Three-Deckers TR
- NRHP reference No.: 89002406
- Added to NRHP: February 9, 1990

The Thomas F. Doran Three-Decker is an historic three-decker in Worcester, Massachusetts. The wood-frame building was built c. 1894, and is one a few well-preserved Stick style three-deckers in the city. The house was listed on the National Register of Historic Places in 1990.

== Description and history ==
The Thomas F. Doran Three-Decker is located in a densely built residential area west of downtown Worcester, on the south side of John Street between North Ashland and Wesby Streets. It is a three-story wood-frame structure, with a mostly clapboarded exterior. It has molding strips between the floors, and a hip roof with bracketed eaves. The front facade has a projecting square bay whose gable end contains spindle woodwork in a sunburst pattern. The porch is also decorated with a spindled frieze and brackets. Its sash windows are framed by bracketed sills and lintels.

The house was built about 1894, during a westward push of triple-decker development in the city which began to penetrate into the more fashionable and upper-class western residential parts of the city. Early residents were typically Irish, and either white-collar or skilled blue-collar laborers. Thomas Doran, its first owner, was stage manager at a local theater, and also owned an adjacent house. Early tenants included a laborer and a gas station operator.

== See also ==
- National Register of Historic Places listings in northwestern Worcester, Massachusetts
- National Register of Historic Places listings in Worcester County, Massachusetts
