= John Wescott Three-Decker =

- U.S. National Register of Historic Places
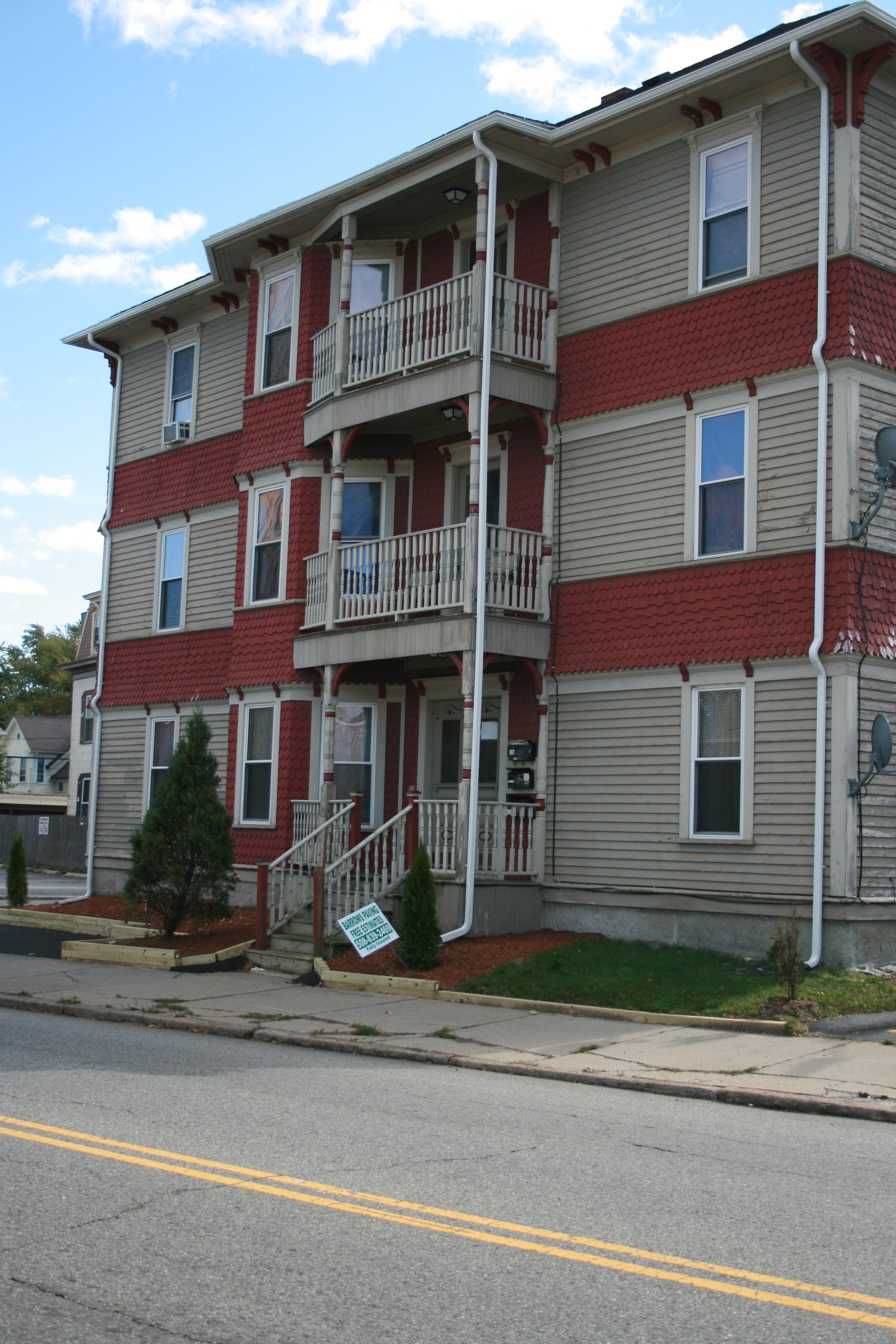

- Location within Massachusetts Location within the United States
- Location: 454 Pleasant St., Worcester, Massachusetts
- Coordinates: 42°15′48″N 71°49′5″W
- Area: less than one acre
- Built: c. 1892
- Architectural style: Queen Anne
- MPS: Worcester Three-Deckers TR
- NRHP reference No.: 89002426
- Added to NRHP: February 9, 1990

The John Wescott Three-Decker, also known as the Wescott-Mulcahy Three-Decker, is a historic triple decker house in Worcester, Massachusetts. It is a well-preserved example of a Queen Anne triple-decker, built about 1892. The building was listed on the National Register of Historic Places in 1990.

== Description and history ==
The John Wescott Three-Decker stands west of downtown Worcester in the city's Piedmont neighborhood, on the south side of Pleasant Street at Mason Street. Unusual for typical triple deckers, it is oriented with its long axis parallel to the street, in order to fit the building onto a long, narrow lot. It is a three-story wood-frame structure, with a hip roof and exterior finished in a combination of wooden clapboards and shingles. Near the center of its front facade is a slightly projecting bay of porches, with turned balusters and posts. The walls are clad in alternating sections of clapboards and shingles, and the roof has a deep cornice studded with pairs of brackets. Small brackets also highlight the trim lines above the sash windows.

The building was constructed about 1892, on a lot that had previously held a two-family residence. Its first owner was John Wescott, a grocer whose store was located across Mason Street. Wescott lived nearby, and rented the units to mainly working-class individuals and families. In 1930 it was purchased by the Mulcahy family, who occupied the ground floor unit, and whose son occupied the top floor unit. The Mulcahy family owned the building through the 1950s, generally occupying two of its units and renting the third. The building underwent a rehabilitation in 2000, when its porches were replaced with replicas of the original.

== See also ==
- National Register of Historic Places listings in northwestern Worcester, Massachusetts
- National Register of Historic Places listings in Worcester County, Massachusetts
