= Robinson and Swan Blocks =

Historic buildings in Worcester, Massachusetts, United States

- U.S. National Register of Historic Places
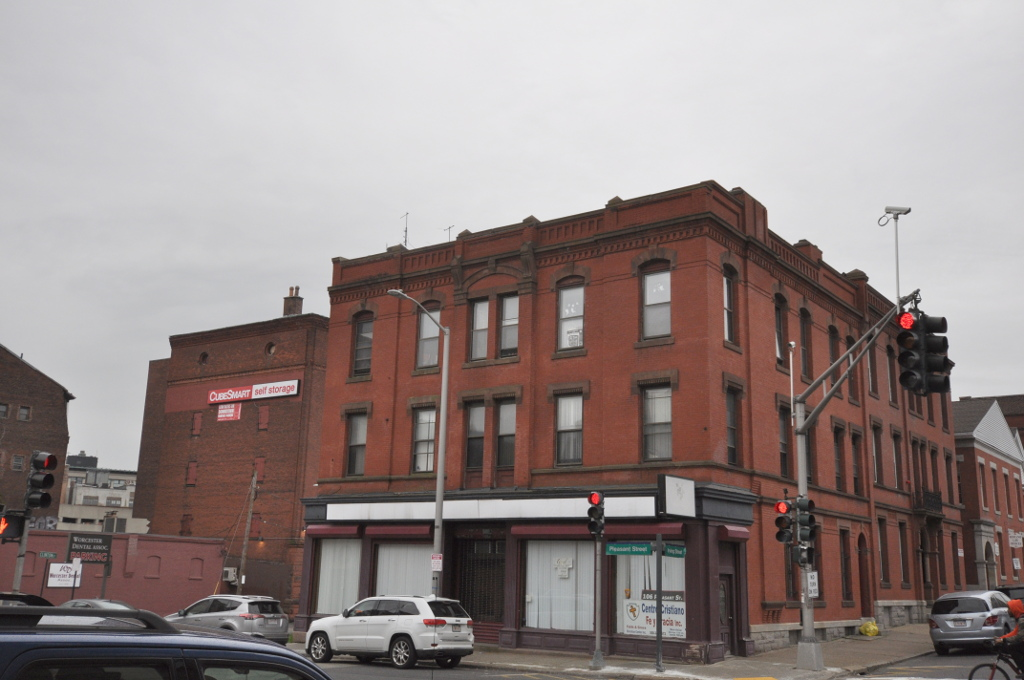

- Location within Massachusetts Location within the United States
- Location: 104–108 Pleasant St. and 1–3 Irving St., Worcester, Massachusetts
- Coordinates: 42°15′49″N 71°48′21″W
- Area: less than one acre
- Built: c. 1884-85
- Architect: Fuller & Delano
- Architectural style: Victorian Gothic
- MPS: Worcester MRA
- NRHP reference No.: 16000208
- Added to NRHP: March 5, 1980

The Robinson and Swan Blocks are a pair of mixed commercial-residential buildings at 104-108 Pleasant Street and 1-3 Irving Street in Worcester, Massachusetts. Built about 1884 to nearly identical designs by Fuller & Delano, the buildings are well-preserved examples of Victorian Gothic architecture executed in brick. They were listed on the National Register of Historic Places in 1980, but due to administrative lapses, are not listed in its NRIS database.

== Description and history ==
The Robinson and Swan Blocks are located two blocks west of downtown Worcester, at the southeast corner of Pleasant and Irving Streets. Both buildings are brick structures, three stories in height. The two buildings are virtually identical in their designs, except for the treatment of the ground floor street facades. The Robinson Block, which faces Pleasant Street, is five bays wide, with storefront display window bays flanking a recessed center entrance on the ground floor. The center and outer bays of the upper floors project slightly, and the building is crowned by a corbelled brick cornice. The center bay has two windows, topped on the second floor by shouldered brownstone lintels, while the outer bays have single windows with similar lintels; the third-floor windows in these bays have segmented-arch tops. The Swan Block, facing Irving Street, differs in having a more residential treatment of the ground floor, with sash windows flanking a more elaborate entrance.

The property on which the blocks were built housed the residence of George Swan, a lawyer. In 1884, Swan had these two building erected on the lot, retaining the local architectural firm of Fuller & Delano to design them. He sold the Robinson Block to physician Joseph Robinson the following year. Each used their building to house both their professional offices and their residences; there is evidence that both also had a second residential unit that may have been rented out.

== See also ==
- National Register of Historic Places listings in northwestern Worcester, Massachusetts
- National Register of Historic Places listings in Worcester County, Massachusetts
