= Chamberlain-Flagg House =

Historic house in Massachusetts, United States

- U.S. National Register of Historic Places
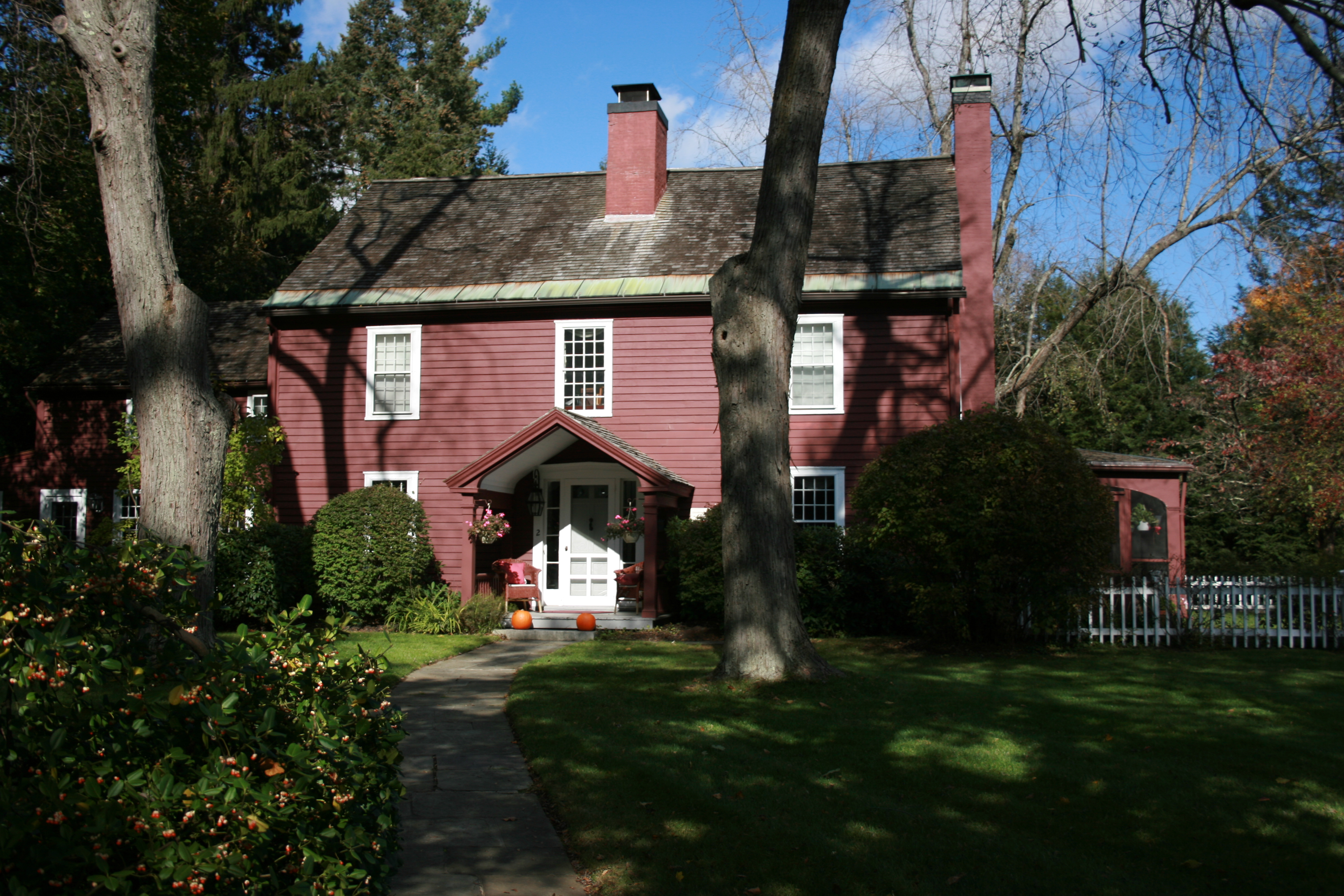

- Location within Massachusetts Location within the United States
- Location: 2 Brookshire Rd., Worcester, Massachusetts
- Coordinates: 42°17′4″N 71°50′2″W
- Area: less than one acre
- Built: c. 1725
- Architectural style: timber-frame vernacular
- MPS: Worcester MRA
- NRHP reference No.: 80000519
- Added to NRHP: March 05, 1980

The Chamberlain-Flagg House is an historic house at 2 Brookshire Road in Worcester, Massachusetts. The timber frame house is believed to be one of the oldest buildings in the city, although its construction date is unclear. It is one of the city's best-preserved 18th-century houses, and was listed on the National Register of Historic Places in 1980.

== Description and history ==
The Chamberlain-Flagg House is located in a suburban setting in northwestern Worcester, at the corner of Brookshire Road and Flagg Street. It is a 2 1/2-story wood-frame structure, with a gabled roof and clapboarded exterior. There are two chimneys, one rising through the center of the front roof face, and another on the right end. The main facade is three bays wide, with windows placed slightly asymmetrically around the center entrance. The entrance is a 20th-century Colonial Revival feature, with sidelight windows and a large gabled hood. A two-story ell extends to the left, and a screen porch to the right.

The house is thought to have been built sometime around 1742, on land that belonged to the family of Jacob Chamberlain, an early settler, but it has also been attributed to equally early members of the Flagg family. By 1800 the house belonged to Elisha Flagg, whose wife was from the Chamberlain family. Stylistically the house resembles those of the earliest area settlers; some features (notably the central chimney placement forward of the roof ridge) are suggestive of 18th-century alterations to the structure.

== See also ==
- National Register of Historic Places listings in northwestern Worcester, Massachusetts
- National Register of Historic Places listings in Worcester County, Massachusetts
