= Edwin Johnson Three-Decker =

- U.S. National Register of Historic Places
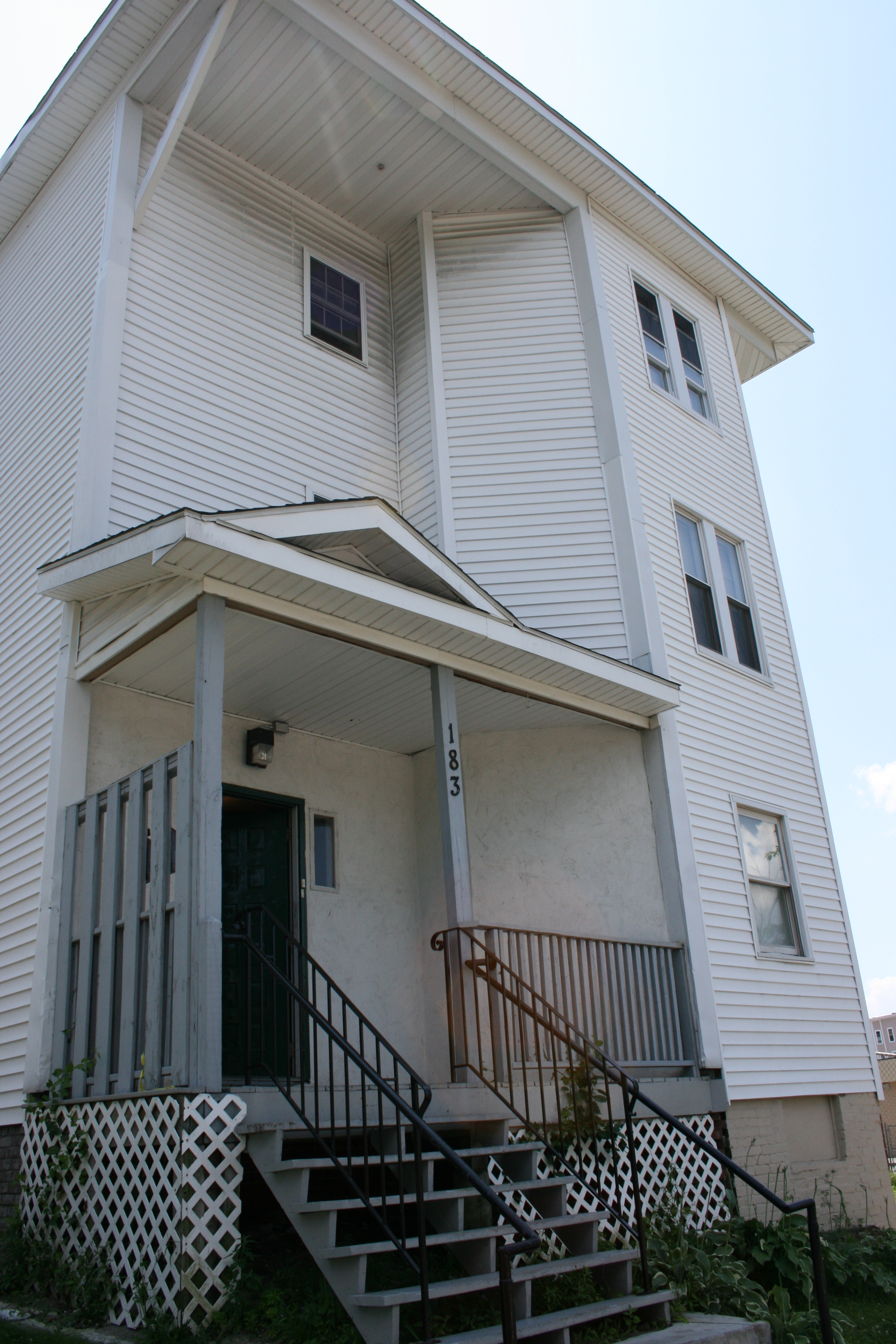

- Location within Massachusetts Location within the United States
- Location: 183 Austin St., Worcester, Massachusetts
- Coordinates: 42°15′40″N 71°49′0″W
- Built: 1892
- Architectural style: Queen Anne
- MPS: Worcester Three-Deckers TR
- NRHP reference No.: 89002389
- Added to NRHP: February 9, 1990

The Edwin Johnson Three-Decker is a historic three-decker in Worcester, Massachusetts. When the building was listed on the National Register of Historic Places in 1990, it was highlighted for its Queen Anne styling, including a three-tier porch with turned balusters, bracketed roofs, and spindled friezes. Since then, much of this detail has been removed or obscured (see photo). It was built about 1892, during a triple-decker construction boom in the Crown Hill area west of the city downtown.

== See also ==
- National Register of Historic Places listings in northwestern Worcester, Massachusetts
- National Register of Historic Places listings in Worcester County, Massachusetts
