= Charles Chamberlain House =

Historic house in Massachusetts, United States

- U.S. National Register of Historic Places
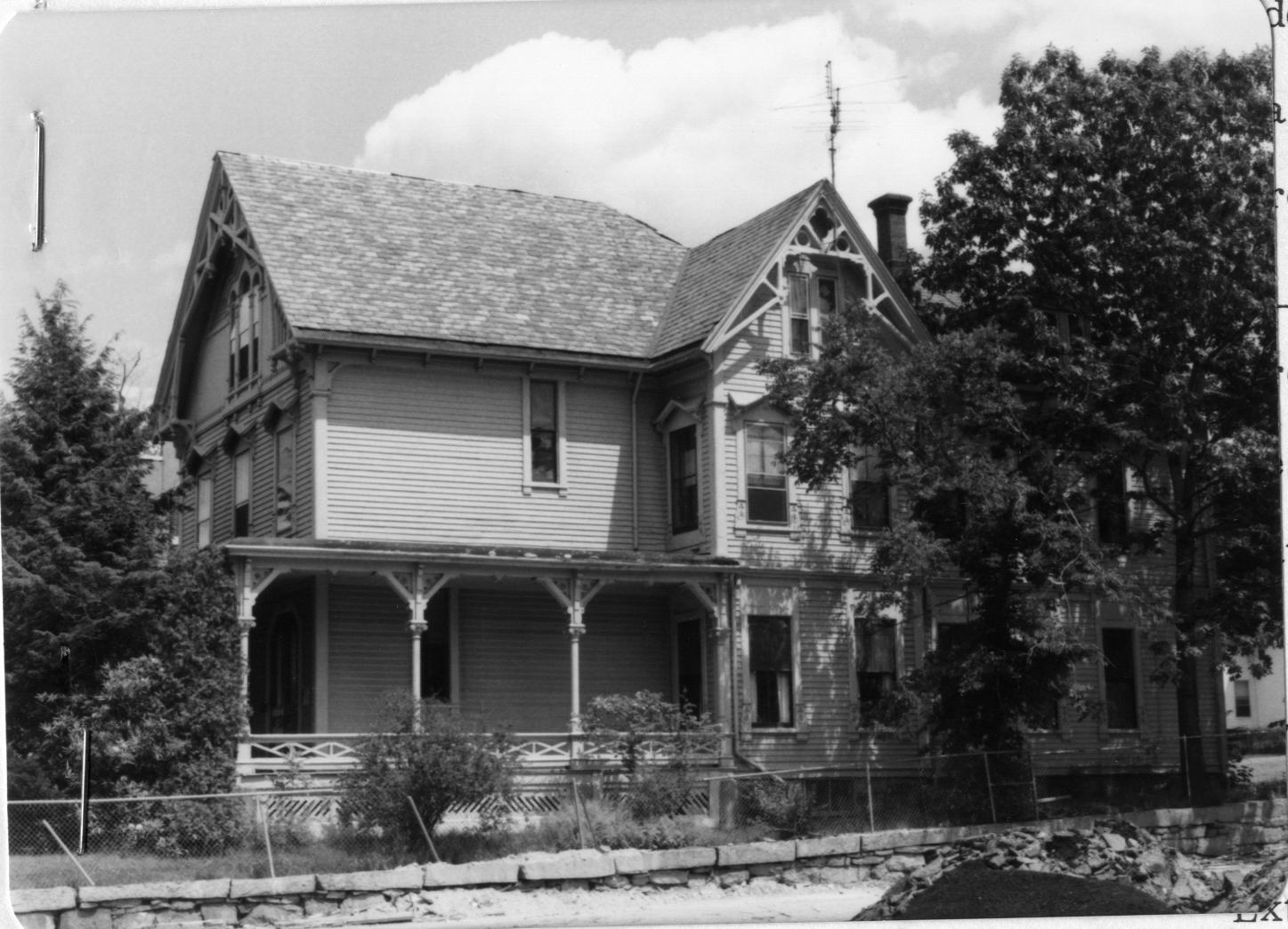
- c. 1978 photo

- Location within Massachusetts Location within the United States
- Location: 373 Pleasant St., Worcester, Massachusetts
- Coordinates: 42°15′48″N 71°48′56″W
- Area: less than one acre
- Built: 1876
- Architectural style: Gothic
- MPS: Worcester MRA
- NRHP reference No.: 80000596
- Added to NRHP: March 05, 1980

The Charles Chamberlain House was a historic house at 373 Pleasant Street in Worcester, Massachusetts. Built in 1876, it was one of the city's finest examples of residential Victorian Gothic architecture. It was added to the National Register of Historic Places in 1980, but was demolished in 1984.

== Description and history ==
The Charles Chamberlain House was located west of downtown Worcester, on the south side of Pleasant Street between the city's Pleasant and Winslow Park, and the Worcester Seventh-Day Adventist Church, which it shared its lot with. It was a 2 1/2-story wood-frame structure, with an L-shaped plan covered by gabled roofs. Its Victorian detailing was an eclectic mix, with spindled Stick style bargeboard in its gables, vertical board siding, a porch supported by delicate turned posts with foliate capitals, and decorated gable aprons. Sash windows were set in rectangular openings topped by lintels with peaked gables, and sills supported by small brackets.

Charles Chamberlain, the first recorded owner, was the owner of a blade manufacturing firm, which also manufactured and repaired lawn mowers and other small machinery. The house was probably moved on its lot sometime between 1922 and 1938, in order to make room for the construction of the adjacent church. The house was demolished in 1984; the site is now used for church parking.

== See also ==
- National Register of Historic Places listings in northwestern Worcester, Massachusetts
- National Register of Historic Places listings in Worcester County, Massachusetts
