= Indian Hill School (Worcester, Massachusetts) =

- U.S. National Register of Historic Places
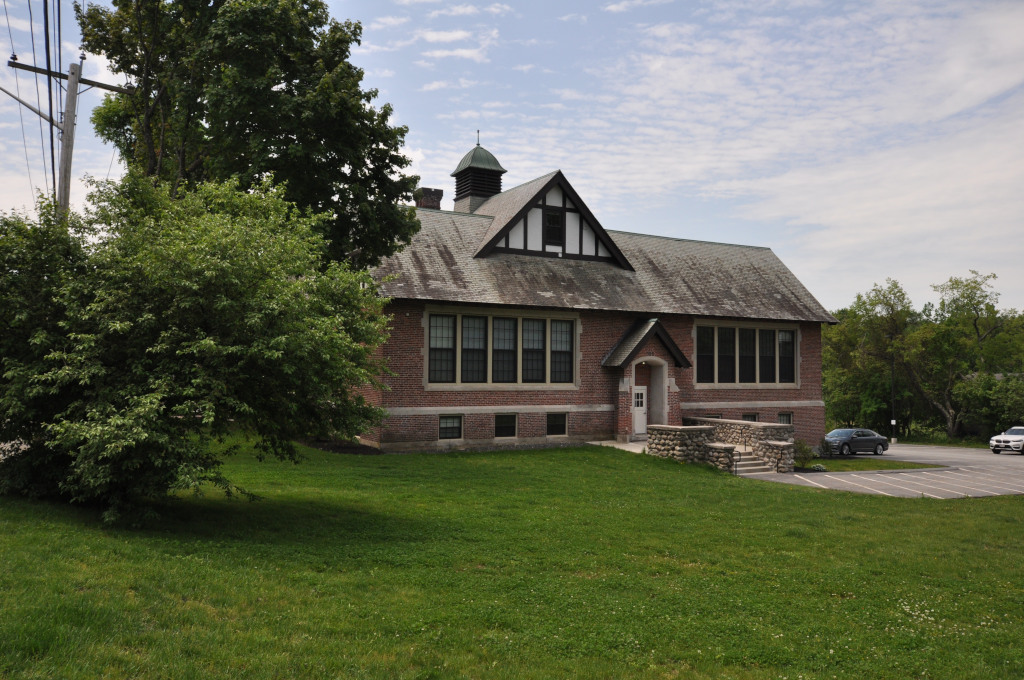

- Location within Massachusetts Location within the United States
- Location: 155 Ararat St., Worcester, MA
- Coordinates: 42°18′48″N 71°48′53″W
- Area: 2 acres (0.81 ha)
- Built: 1924
- Architect: Fuller & Delano
- Architectural style: Tudor Revival
- NRHP reference No.: 100007665
- Added to NRHP: May 2, 2022

The Indian Hill School is a historic school building at 155 Ararat Street in Worcester, Massachusetts. Built in 1924, it is a good local example of Tudor Revival architecture. It served as a public school until 1981, after which it was converted to residential use. The building was listed on the National Register of Historic Places in 2022.

== Description and history ==
The former Indian Hill School is located in the northern suburban Indian Hill neighborhood of Worcester, at the southwest corner of Ararat Street and Indian Hill Road. It is a 1-1/2 story structure, its ground floor finished in brick and cast stone, and the upper levels finished in stucco and half-timbering typical of the Tudor Revival. The building is roughly rectangular, with a long main block extending along Indian Hill Road topped by a gabled roof. Flanking it are end wings extending to the rear, with an infill extension joining the end wings behind the main block. The interior retains many original finishes, although its classroom spaces have been converted to residences.

The school was designed by the Worcester architectural firm of Fuller & Delano and was built in 1924. It was built to meet the increased demand for education spurred by the residential development of the Indian Hill area, which began as a planned community developed by the Norton Company for its employees. Its Tudor Revival styling is unique among Worcester's early 20th-century school buildings. It served as a school until 1981, and was subsequently converted to residential use.

== See also ==
- National Register of Historic Places listings in northwestern Worcester, Massachusetts
- National Register of Historic Places listings in Worcester County, Massachusetts
