= Marcus Hobbs House =

Historic house in Massachusetts, United States

- U.S. National Register of Historic Places
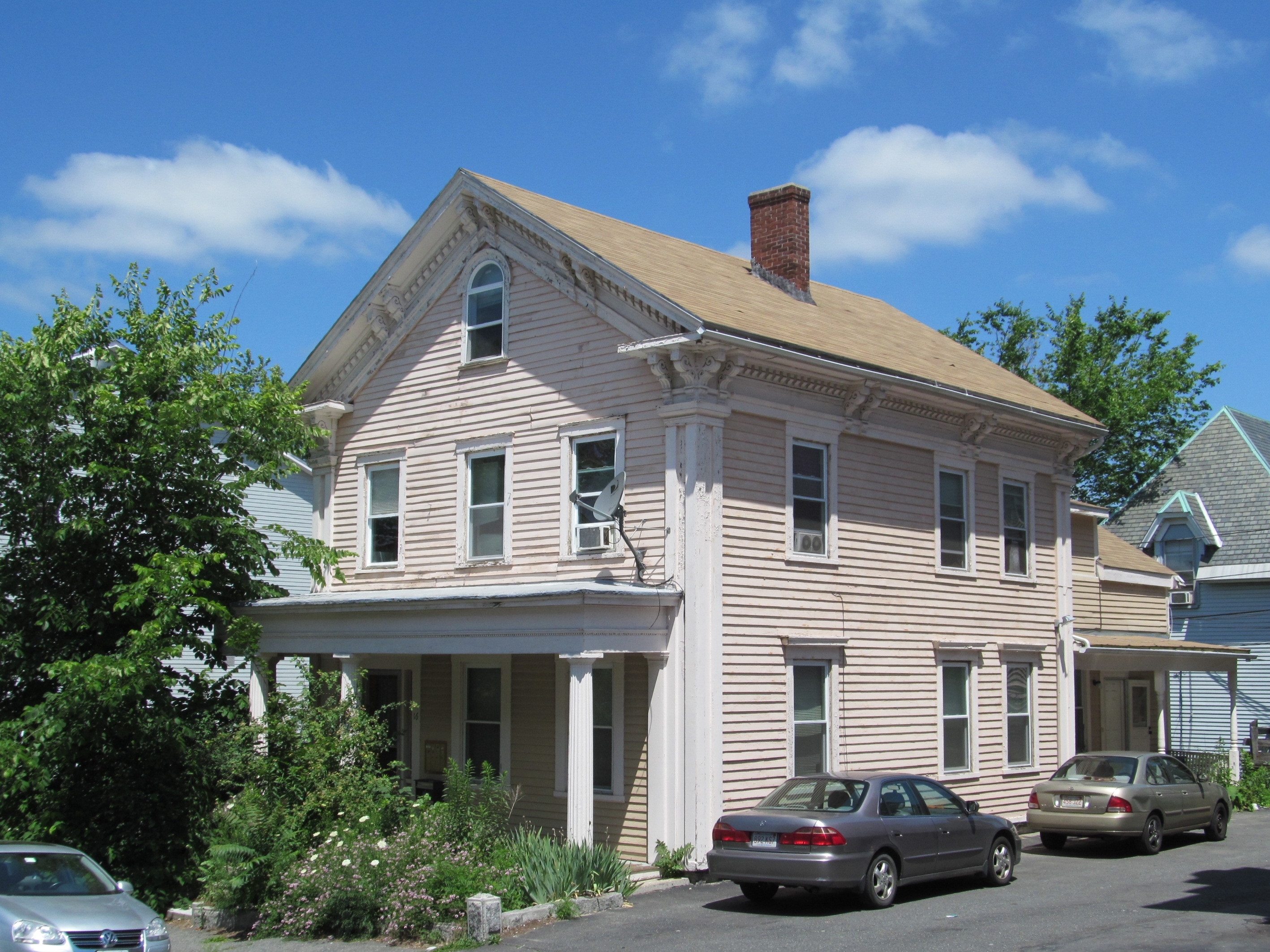
- Marcus Hobbs House

- Location within Massachusetts Location within the United States
- Location: 16 William St., Worcester, Massachusetts
- Coordinates: 42°16′2″N 71°48′19″W
- Area: less than one acre
- Built: 1849
- Architectural style: Greek Revival, Italianate
- MPS: Worcester MRA
- NRHP reference No.: 80000582
- Added to NRHP: March 05, 1980

The Marcus Hobbs House is an historic house at 16 William Street in Worcester, Massachusetts. Built in 1849, it is an example of mid-19th century Greek Revival housing with added Italianate features. The house was listed on the National Register of Historic Places in 1980.

== Description and history ==
The Marcus Hobbs House is located in a densely built residential area a short way west of downtown Worcester, on the north side of William Street west of Linden Street. It is a 2 1/2-story wood frame structure, with a gabled roof and clapboarded exterior. Its front facade is three bays wide, with the main entrance in the left bay flanked by sidelight windows. A single-story porch extends across the front and around to the left side, supported by fluted Doric columns. The building corners have paneled pilasters, which rise to an entablature decorated with paired carved wooden brackets. The main gable has a round-arch window at its peak.

The house was built in 1849 by carpenter Marcus Hobbs and was originally in a Greek Revival style. In about 1870 it was restyled with significant Italianate features, including the round-arch gable window, paired brackets in the eaves, and dentil molding. The porch, originally limited to the front of the house, was probably also extended at that time. Later owners of the property include Edward Hamilton, who founded the Mozart Society of Worcester.

== See also ==
- National Register of Historic Places listings in northwestern Worcester, Massachusetts
- National Register of Historic Places listings in Worcester County, Massachusetts
