= Harding-Winter Street Manufacturing District =

Historic district in Massachusetts, United States

- U.S. National Register of Historic Places
- U.S. Historic district
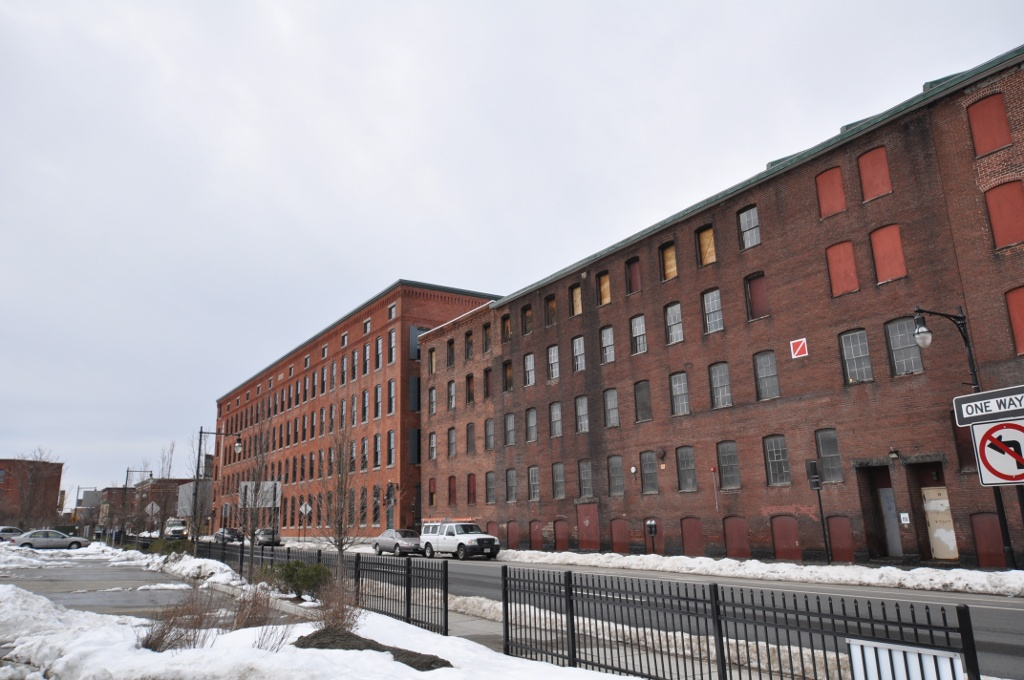

- Location within Massachusetts Location within the United States
- Location: 28-88 Winter St., 28-48 Water St., and properties on Pond and Winter Sts., Worcester, Massachusetts
- Coordinates: 42°15′30″N 71°47′42″W
- Built: 1870
- Architectural style: Late Victorian
- MPS: Worcester MRA
- NRHP reference No.: 80000543
- Added to NRHP: March 05, 1980

The Harding-Winter Street Manufacturing District encompasses a surviving fragment of the 19th century industrial history of Worcester, Massachusetts. The district includes seven brick factory buildings which were built between 1870 and 1898. They are a remnant of a once-extensive manufacturing district that extended further along Franklin and Grafton Streets, but has become fragmented by urban redevelopment and the construction of nearby Interstate 290. The district is bounded on the south by Pond Street, on the west by Harding Street, on the east by Water Street, and on the north by the rear property lines of Winter Street properties. The district was listed on the National Register of Historic Places in 1980.

Harding Street was created in the 1850s by filling in a portion of the Blackstone Canal, and this area developed as a center of Worcester's footwear industry. Three of the buildings, all built in 1870, were built for the Walker Shoe Company, founded in 1862 by two brothers. The company manufactured heavy boots, and was one of the city's first major footwear makers, serving as a training ground for later shoemakers. Another was built in 1890 for the Hill Envelope Company, founded in 1848 by the inventor of an envelope folding machine. It later became part of US Envelope, which was still operating on the premises in 1980. Other buildings in the district were built for another bootmaker, an underwear manufacturer, and a maker of stained glass windows

== See also ==
- National Register of Historic Places listings in northwestern Worcester, Massachusetts
- National Register of Historic Places listings in Worcester County, Massachusetts
