= James McPartland Three-Decker =

- U.S. National Register of Historic Places
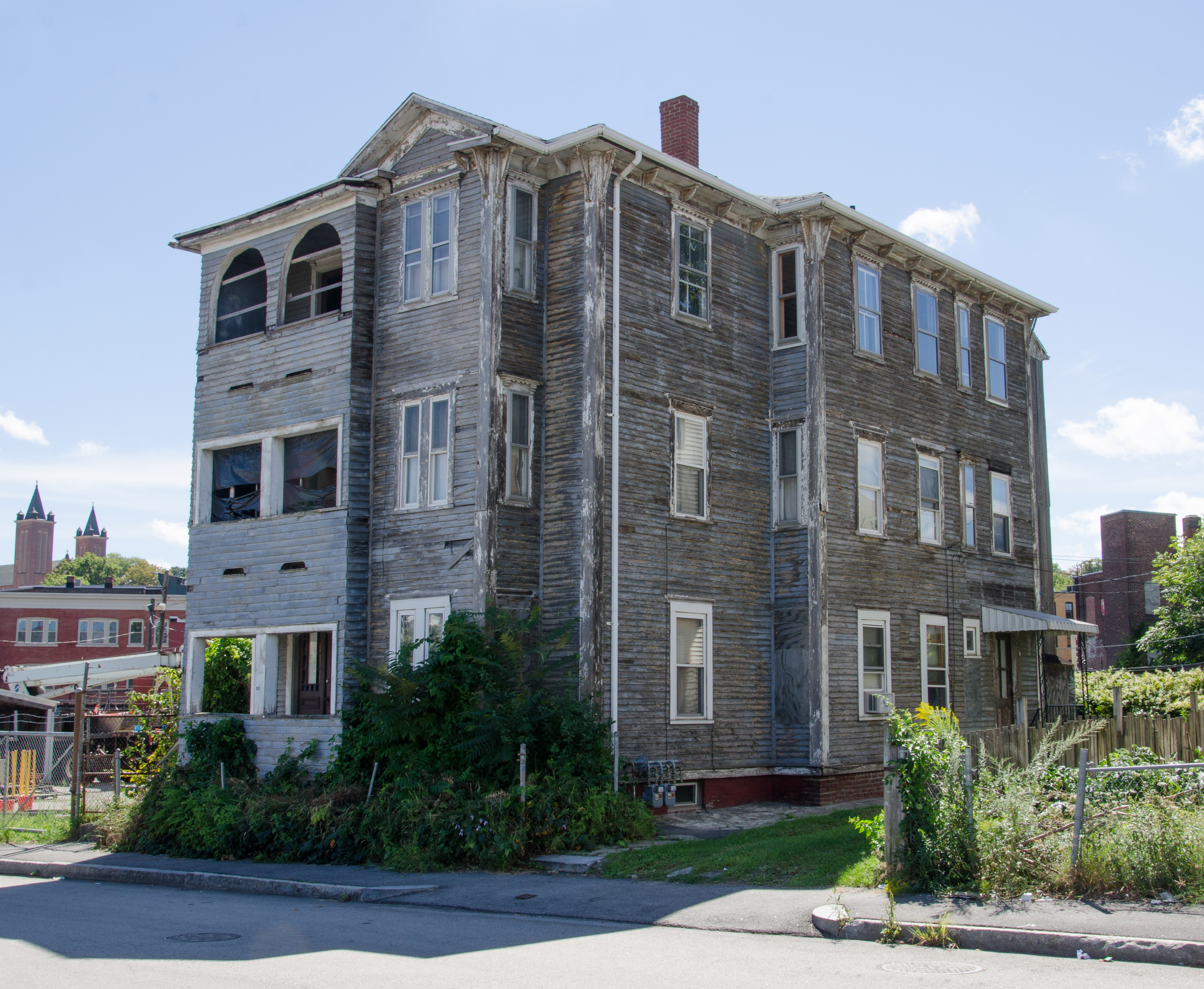

- Location within Massachusetts Location within the United States
- Location: 17 Pond St. Worcester, Massachusetts
- Coordinates: 42°15′26″N 71°47′51″W
- Built: 1888
- Architectural style: Queen Anne
- MPS: Worcester Three-Deckers TR
- NRHP reference No.: 89002428
- Added to NRHP: February 9, 1990

The James McPartland Three-Decker is a historic three-decker in Worcester, Massachusetts, built around 1888. It is a rare surviving instance of the form in Worcester's East Side Irish neighborhood, with a hip roof and decorative brackets in the eaves. A square projecting section on the front facade's right side is topped by a gable roof and shingled porches take up the left side, met on the third floor with round-arch openings.

The house was listed on the National Register of Historic Places in 1990.

== See also ==
- National Register of Historic Places listings in northwestern Worcester, Massachusetts
- National Register of Historic Places listings in Worcester County, Massachusetts
