= William McFarland House =

Historic house in Massachusetts, United States

- U.S. National Register of Historic Places
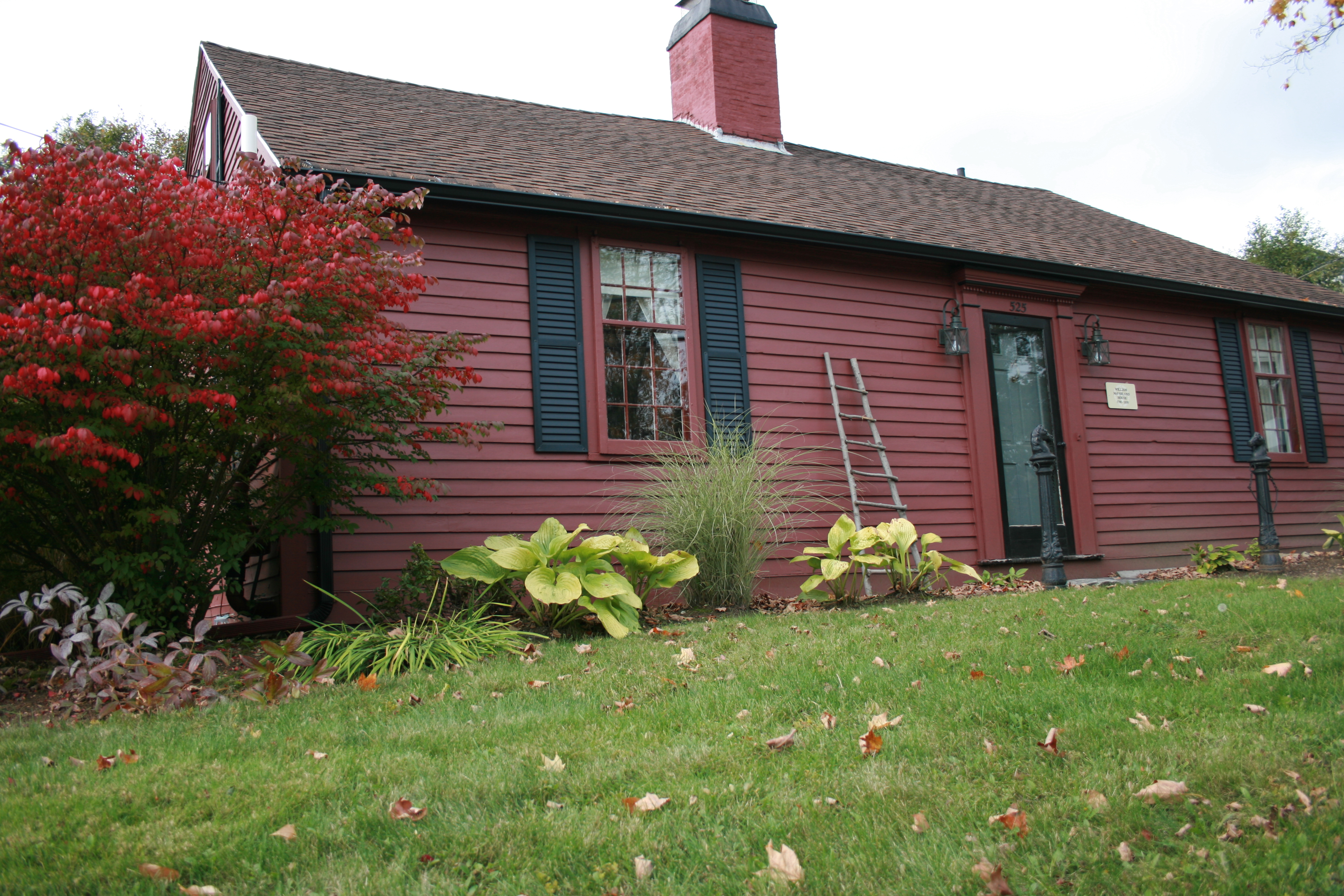

- Location within Massachusetts Location within the United States
- Location: 525 Salisbury St., Worcester, Massachusetts
- Coordinates: 42°17′24″N 71°49′54″W
- Built: 1743
- MPS: Worcester MRA
- NRHP reference No.: 80000517
- Added to NRHP: March 5, 1980

The William McFarland House is an historic house at 525 Salisbury Street in Worcester, Massachusetts. It is a 1 1/2-story wood-frame Cape style structure, with a side-gable roof, central chimney, clapboard siding, and rubblestone foundation. Its main facade is three bays wide, slightly asymmetrical, with a center entrance flanked by pilasters and topped by a modest entablature. Probably built sometime between 1743 and 1759, the house is one of Worcester's oldest surviving structures. It was probably built by William McFarland, Sr., a lieutenant in the American Revolutionary War, and remained in that family for over 100 years.

The house was listed on the National Register of Historic Places in 1980.

== See also ==
- National Register of Historic Places listings in northwestern Worcester, Massachusetts
- National Register of Historic Places listings in Worcester County, Massachusetts
