= Enterprise Building (Worcester, Massachusetts) =

- U.S. National Register of Historic Places
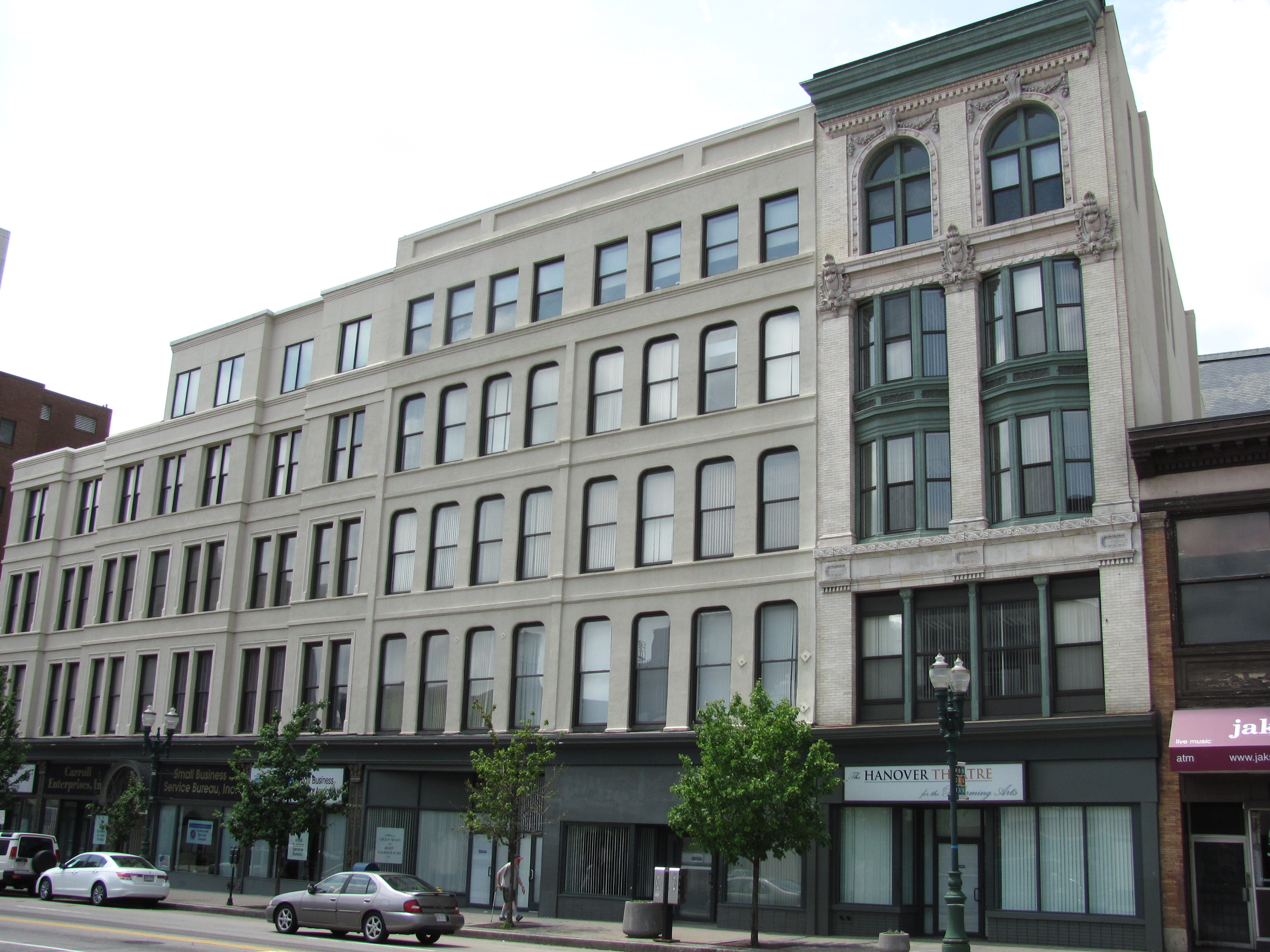
- Enterprise Building

- Location within Massachusetts Location within the United States
- Location: 540 Main St., Worcester, Massachusetts
- Coordinates: 42°15′40″N 71°48′15″W
- Area: less than one acre
- Built: 1900
- Architect: Fuller & Delano
- Architectural style: Beaux Arts
- MPS: Worcester MRA
- NRHP reference No.: 80000608
- Added to NRHP: March 05, 1980

The Enterprise Building is an historic commercial building at 540 Main Street in Worcester, Massachusetts. When it was built in 1900, this five story brick building achieved notice for its elaborate Beaux Arts decorations. The building was listed on the National Register of Historic Places in 1980.

== Description and history ==
The Enterprise Building is located in downtown Worcester, on the west side of Main Street, roughly opposite its junction with Federal Street. It is a narrow five-story structure, its facade just two bays wide. The ground floor has a single modern storefront, which is topped by a metal cornice. The second floor has four sash windows separated by round columns and topped by a frieze band. The third and fourth floors each have two slightly projecting polygonal bay windows, with the bays separated and flanked by pilasters topped with limestone cartouches. The fifth floor has round-arch windows with terra cotta surrounds and swag panels, and is topped by band of dentil moulding and a pressed metal cornice.

The building was constructed in 1900 to a design by Fuller & Delano, a prominent local firm. It was built for William Dexter, a prominent local real estate developer who owned the adjacent buildings; according to building permits it was intended as an annex to those, but it is substantially more architecturally sophisticated.

== See also ==
- National Register of Historic Places listings in northwestern Worcester, Massachusetts
- National Register of Historic Places listings in Worcester County, Massachusetts
