= John Riordan Three-Decker =

- U.S. National Register of Historic Places
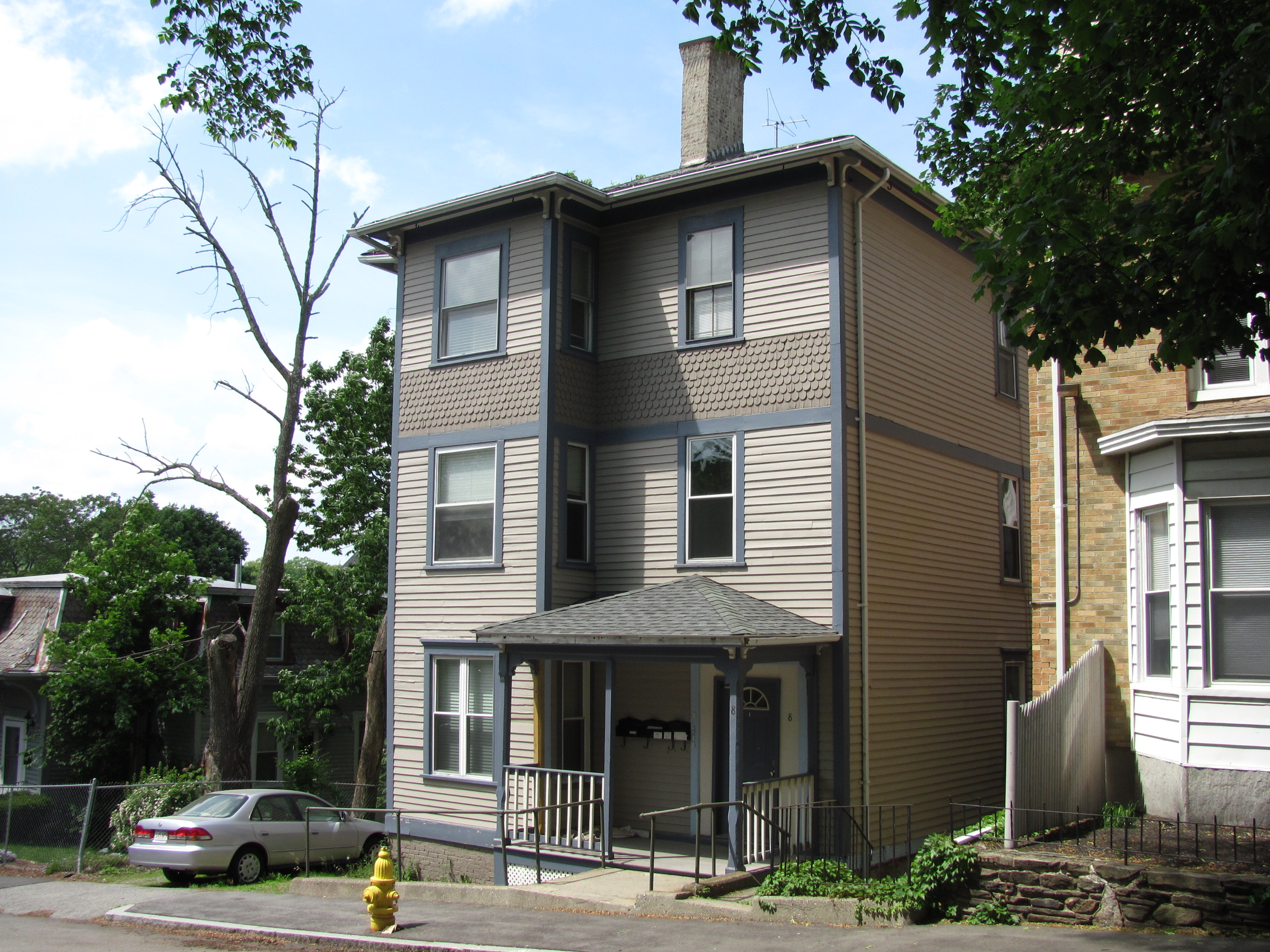
- John Riordan Three-Decker

- Location within Massachusetts Location within the United States
- Location: 8 Dix St., Worcester, Massachusetts
- Coordinates: 42°16′10″N 71°48′14″W
- Built: 1888
- Architectural style: Queen Anne
- MPS: Worcester Three-Deckers TR
- NRHP reference No.: 89002405
- Added to NRHP: February 9, 1990

The John Riordan Three-Decker is an historic three-decker house in Worcester, Massachusetts. Built in 1888, it is a rare survivor of the earliest phase of three-decker construction in the area northwest of Worcester's downtown. It features a single-story entry porch and an atypical square projecting bay-rather than the more typical angled bay-flanking the entrance. Its early occupants were lower-income white collar workers, and skilled blue collar workers, predominantly Irish in origin.

The house was listed on the National Register of Historic Places in 1990.

== See also ==
- National Register of Historic Places listings in northwestern Worcester, Massachusetts
- National Register of Historic Places listings in Worcester County, Massachusetts
