= Amos P. Cutting =

American architect

- Born: September 13, 1839; Lyme, New Hampshire
- Died: February 6, 1896 (aged 56); Los Angeles
- Occupation: Architect
- Awards: Fellow, American Institute of Architects (1889)
- Practice: A. P. Cutting; Cutting & Holman; Cutting & Forbush; Cutting, Carleton & Cutting

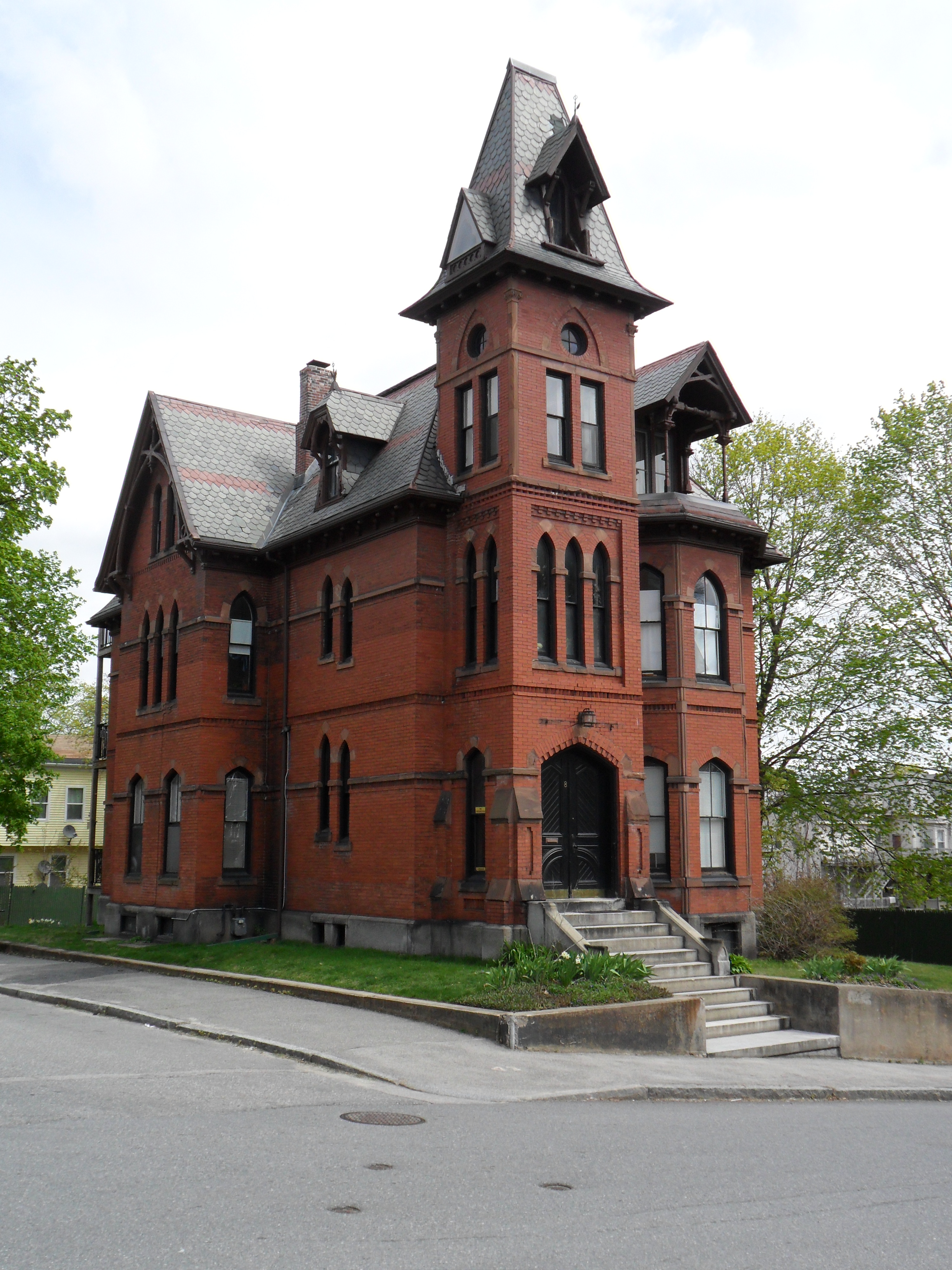
The Franklin Wesson House in Worcester, designed by Cutting in the High Victorian Gothic style and completed in 1874.

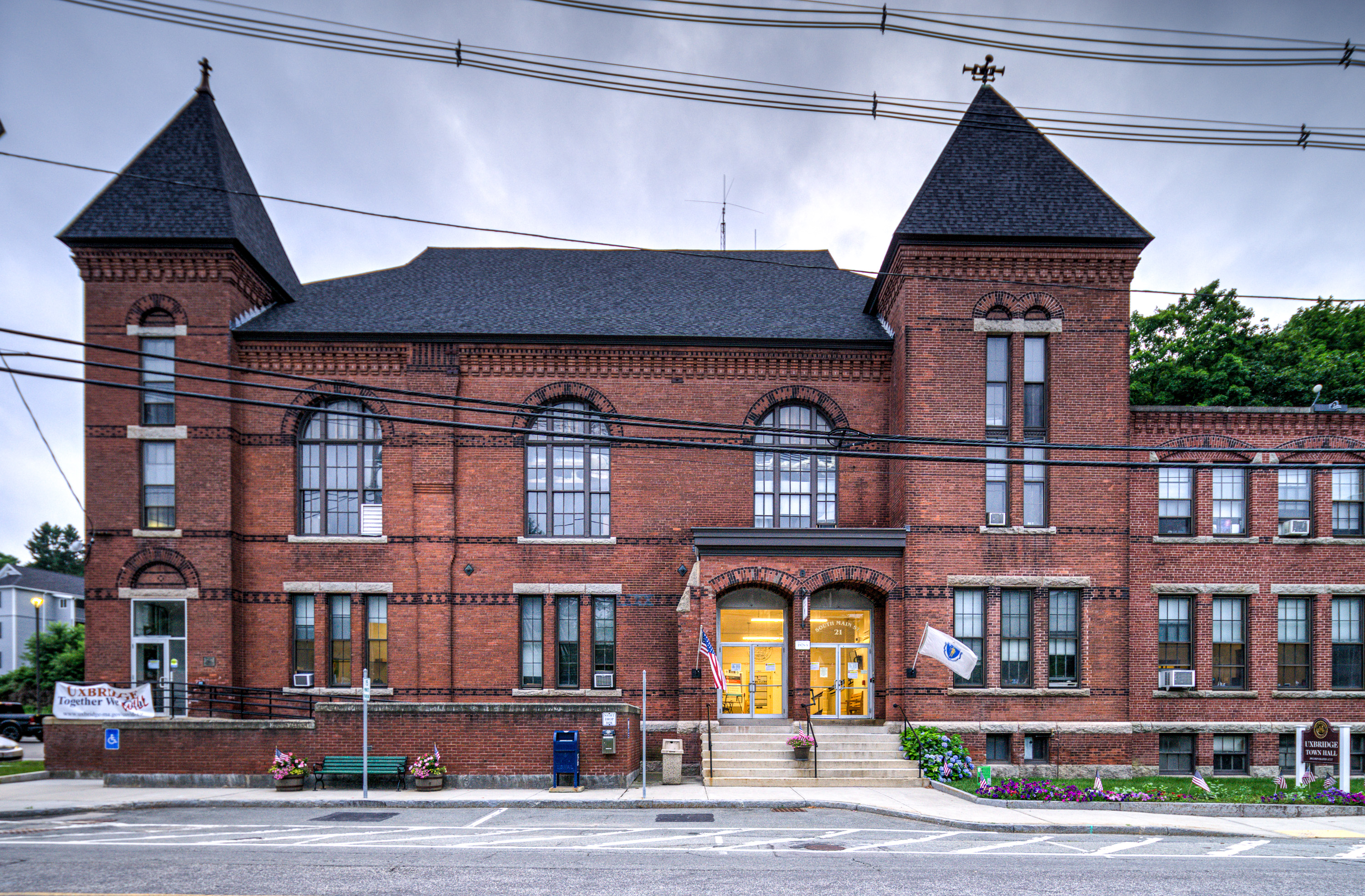
The Uxbridge Town Hall, designed by Cutting in the High Victorian Gothic style and completed in 1879.

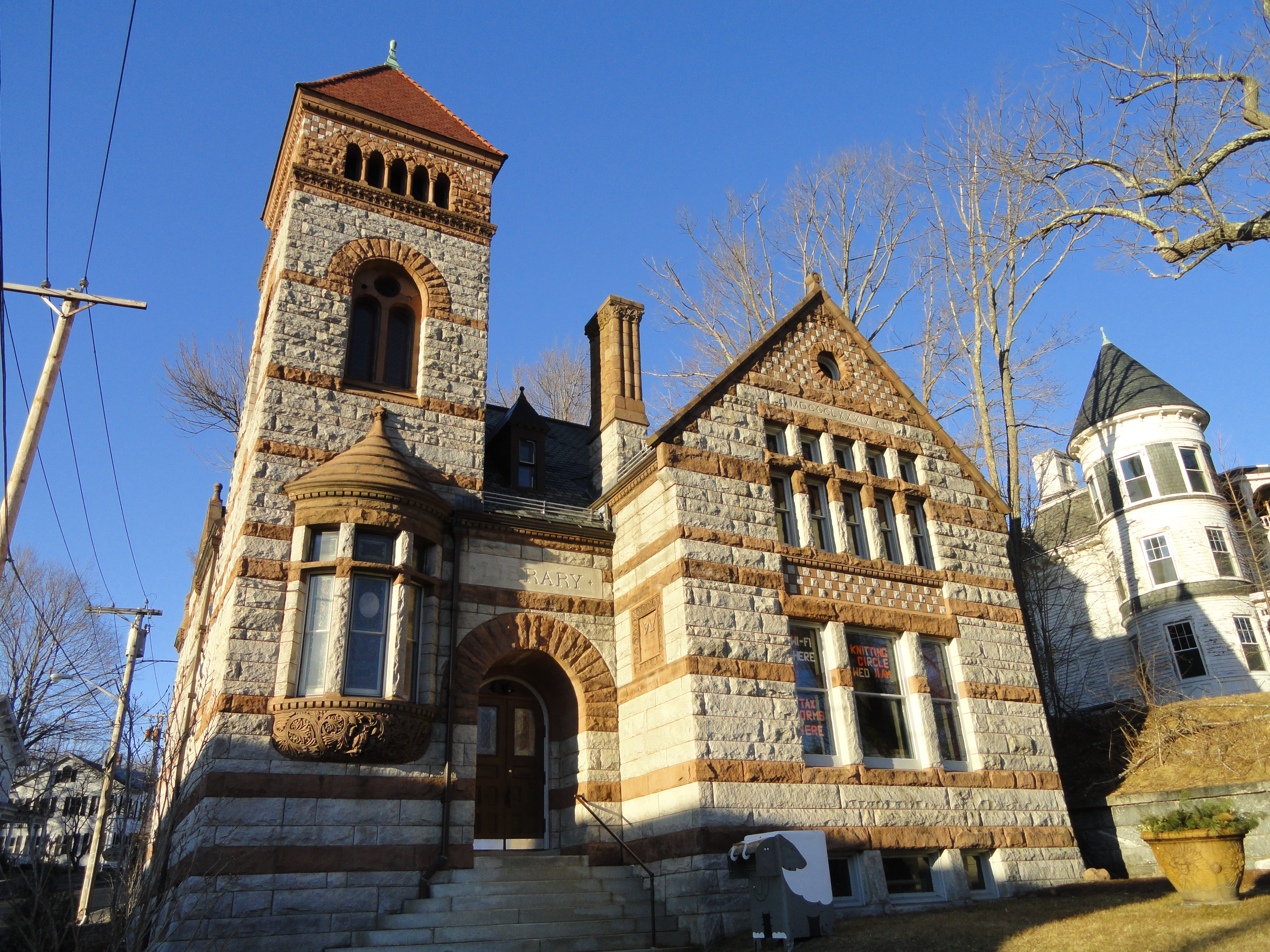
The Warren Public Library, designed by Cutting in the Richardsonian Romanesque style and completed in 1890.

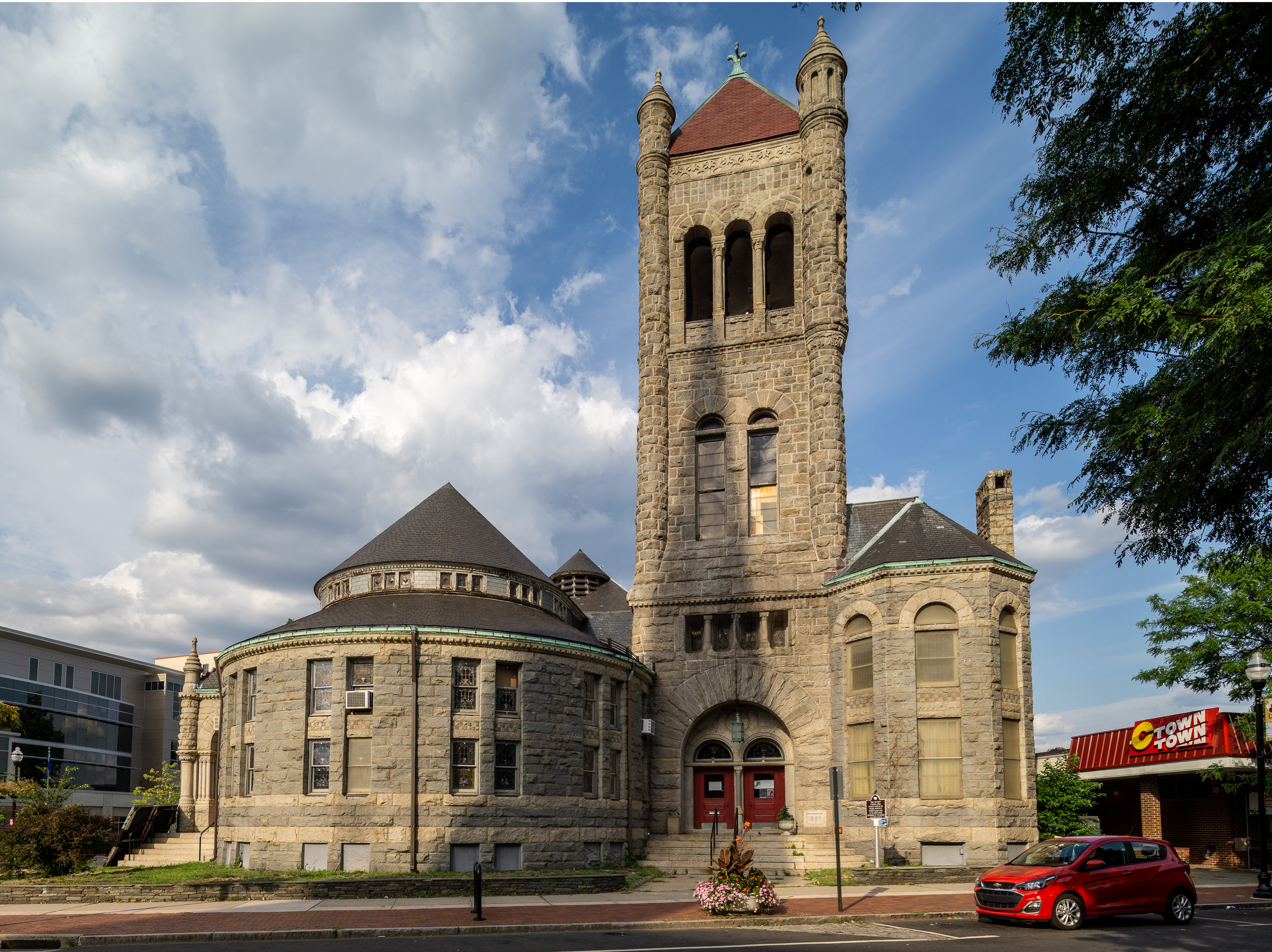
The former Trinity Methodist Episcopal Church in New Britain, Connecticut, designed by Cutting in the Richardsonian Romanesque style and completed in 1891.

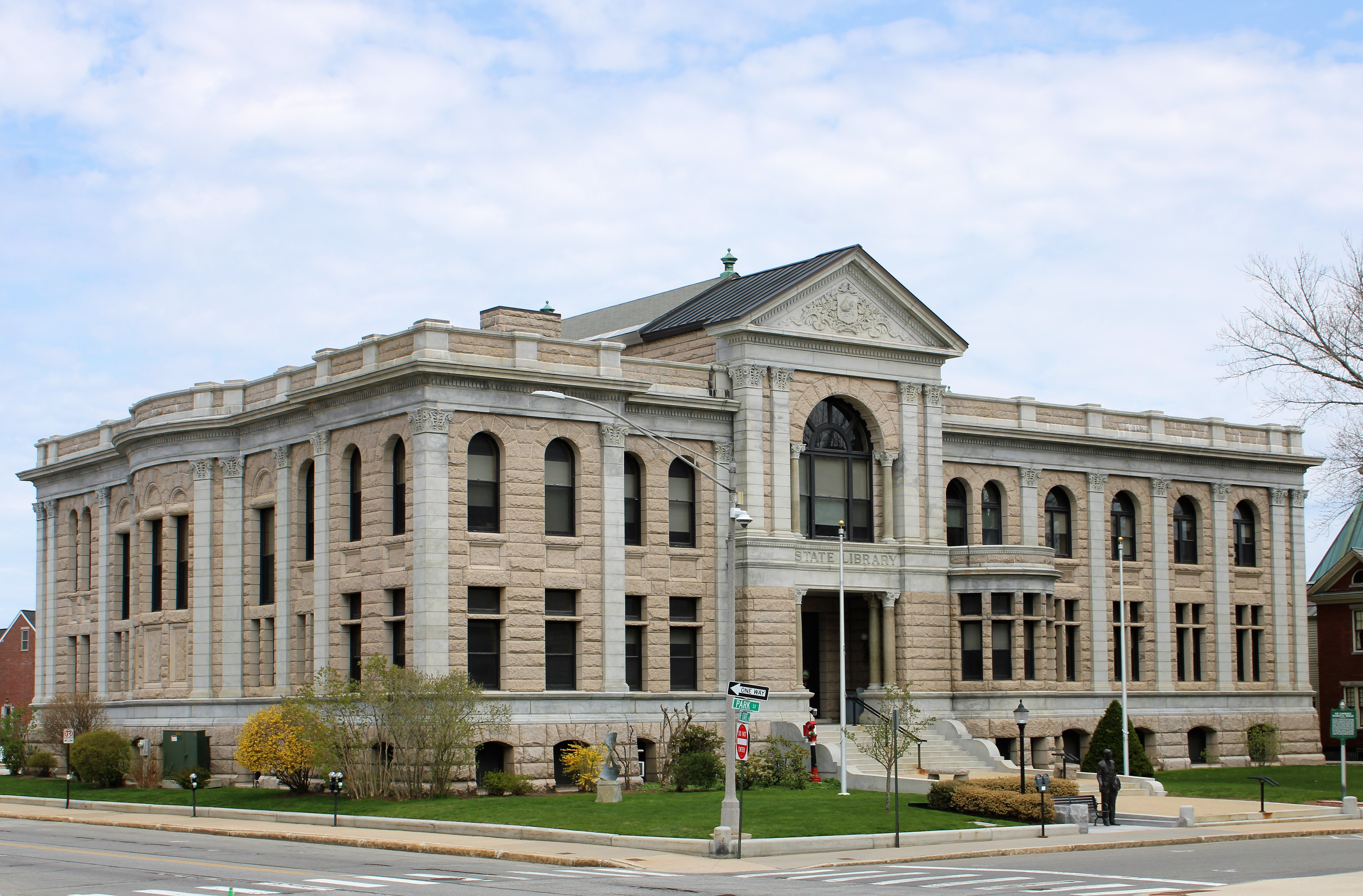
The New Hampshire State Library in Concord, New Hampshire, designed by Cutting in the Neoclassical style and completed in 1895.

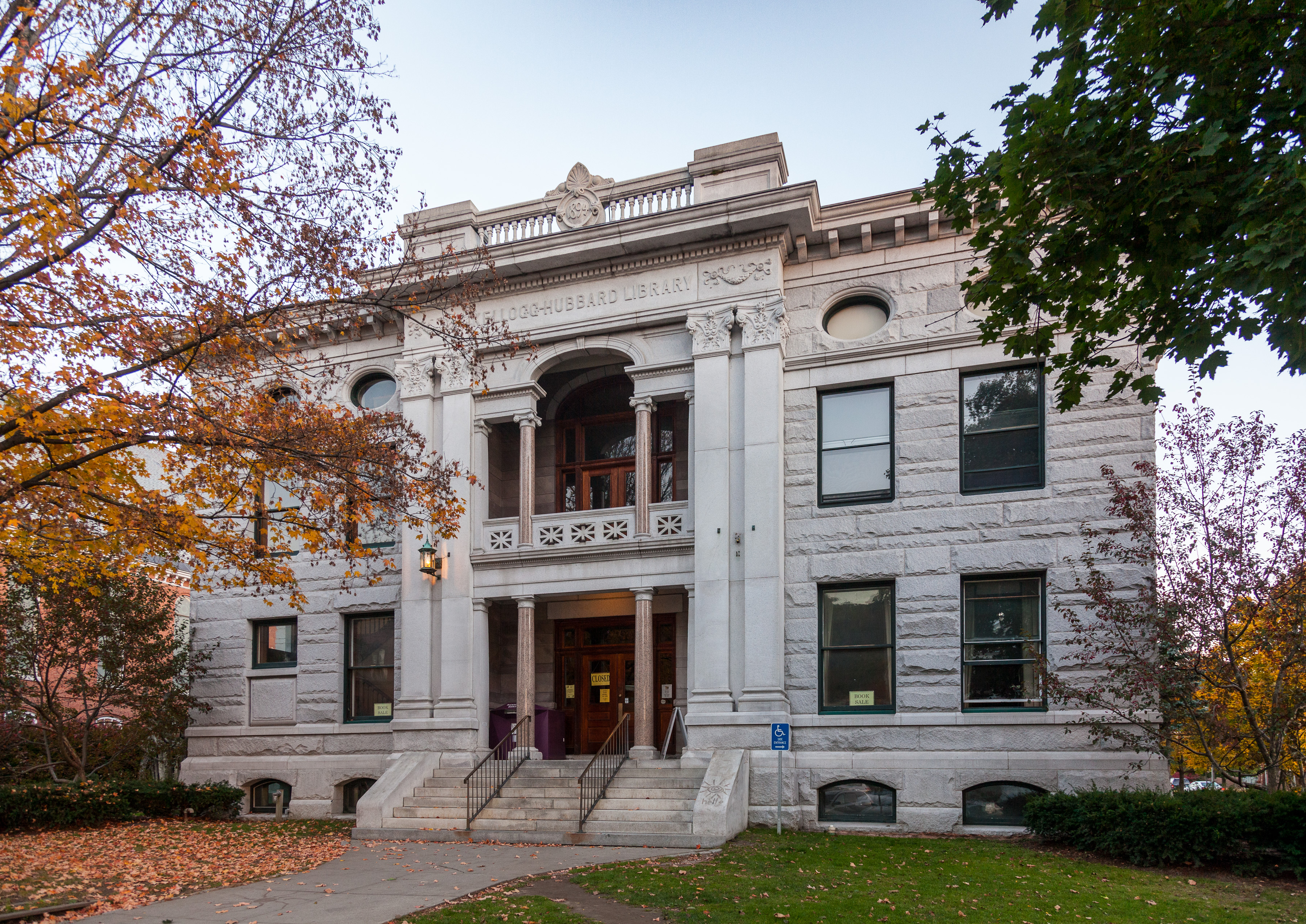
The Kellogg-Hubbard Library in Montpelier, Vermont, designed by Cutting in the Neoclassical style and completed in 1896.

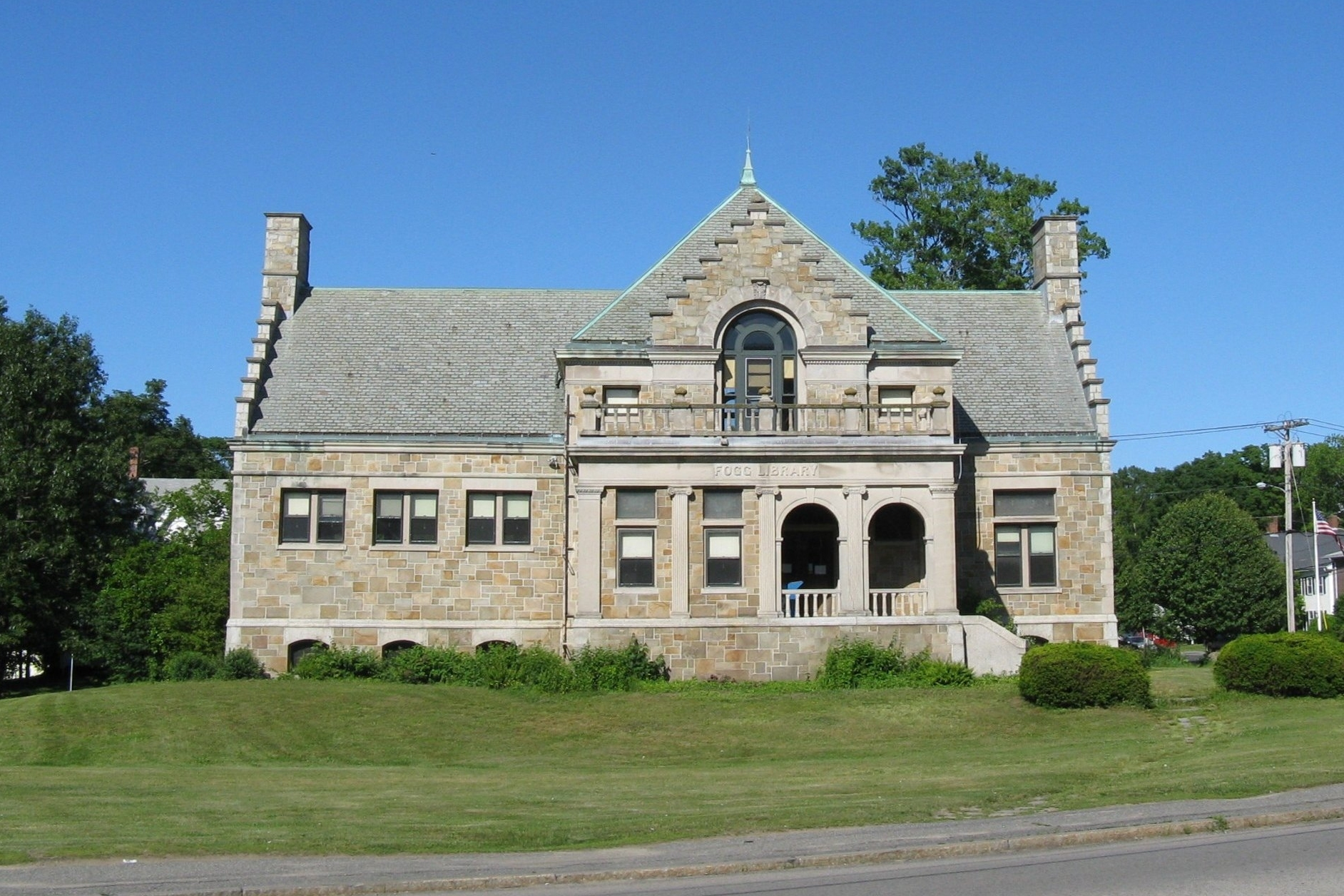
The Fogg Library in South Weymouth, designed by Cutting, Carleton & Cutting in the Renaissance Revival style and completed in 1898.

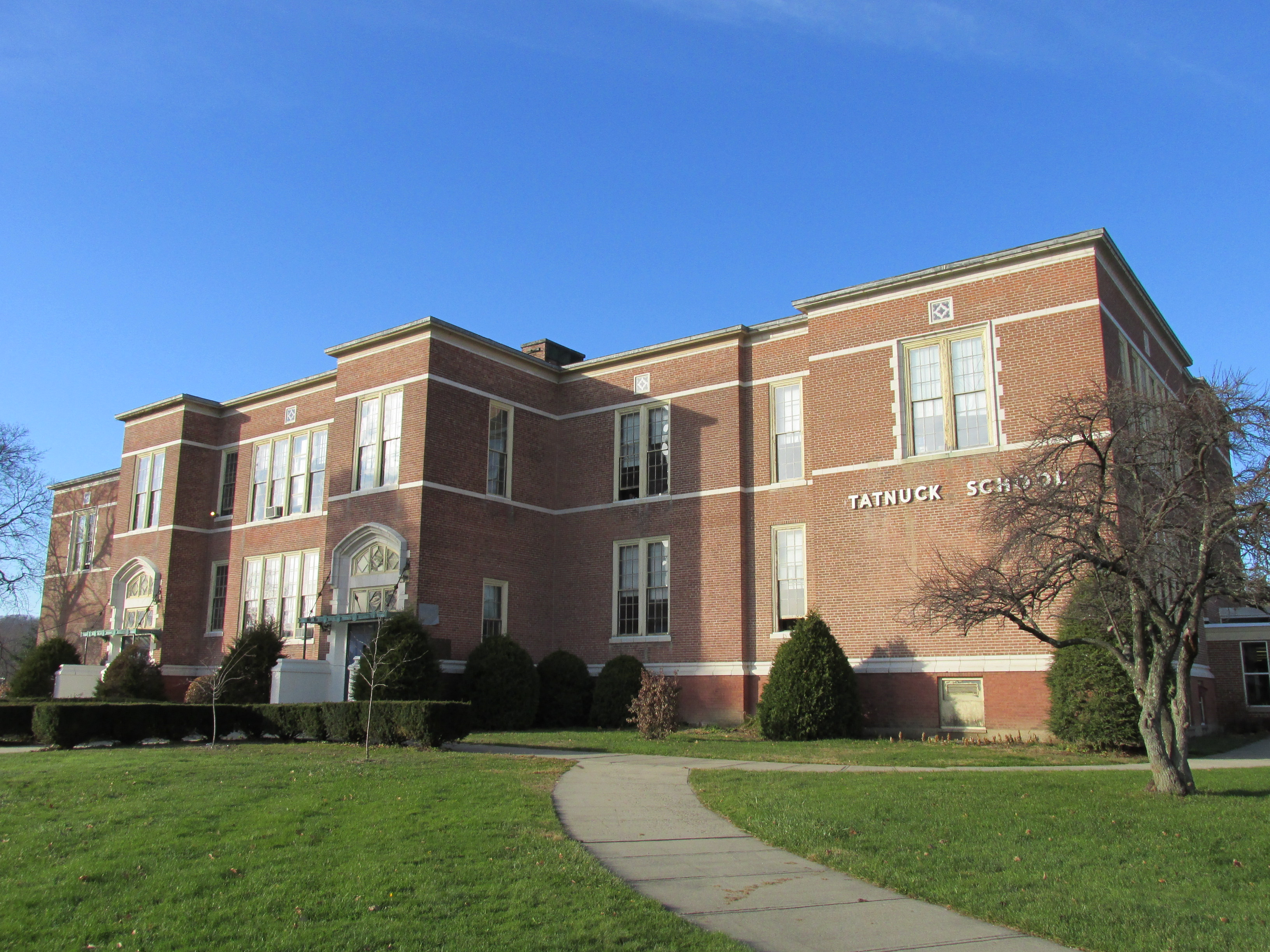
The Tatnuck School in Worcester, designed by Cutting, Carleton & Cutting in the Tudor Revival style and completed in 1909.

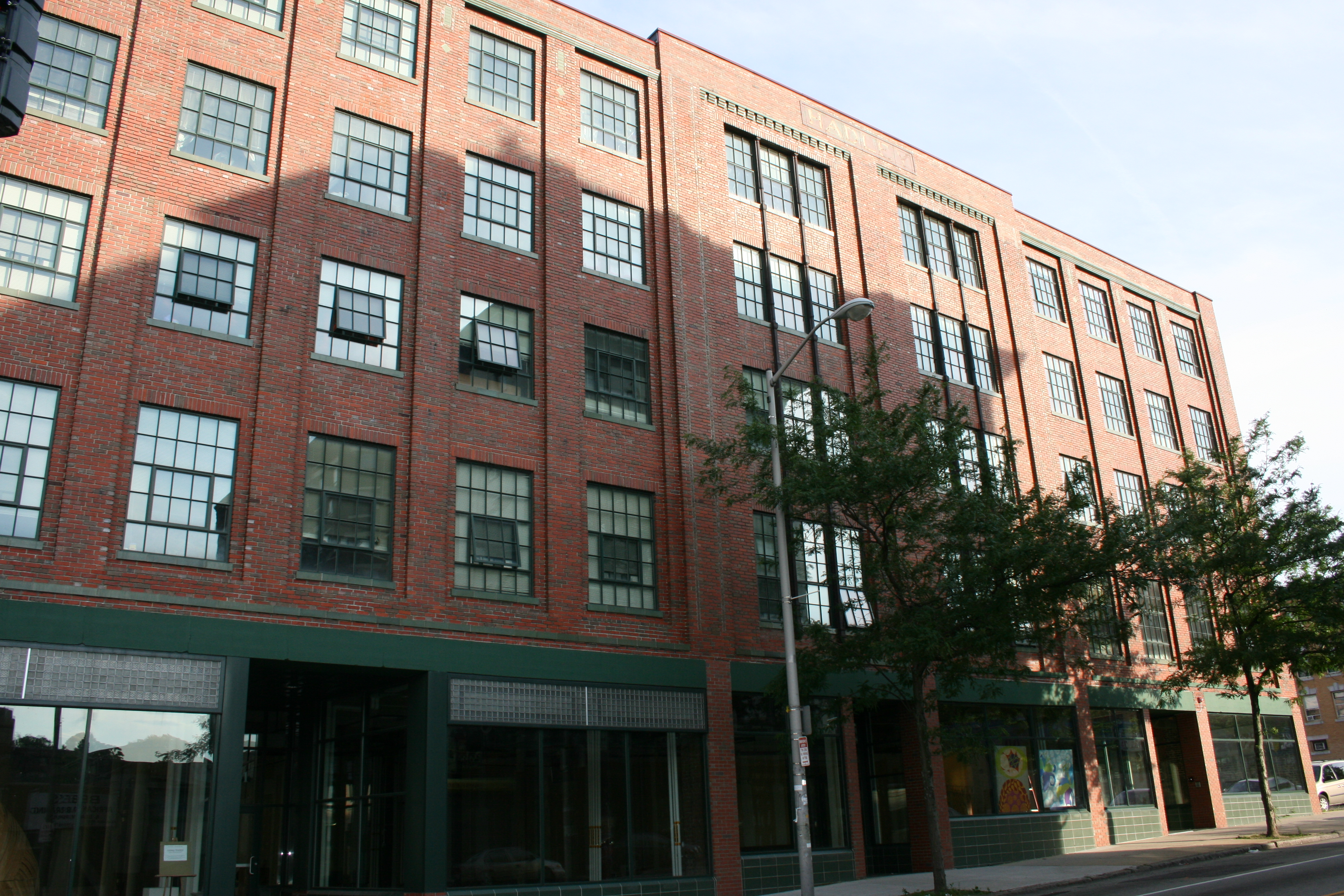
The Hadley Furniture Company Building in Worcester, designed by Cutting, Carleton & Cutting in the Colonial Revival style and completed in 1924.

Amos P. Cutting FAIA (September 13, 1839 – February 6, 1896) was an American architect in practice in Worcester, Massachusetts. He entered practice in 1868 and developed a practice specializing in the design of churches and public buildings. Shortly before his death he organized the firm of Cutting, Carleton & Cutting; it maintained his specialties and outlived him by over thirty years.

== Life and career ==
Amos Porter Cutting was born September 13, 1839, in Lyme, New Hampshire, to Hiram Cutting and Harriet Newell Cutting, née Chapin. When he was a toddler the family moved to Newport, Vermont. He was trained as a carpenter in Newport and Springfield, Massachusetts, and settled in Worcester in 1862. There he worked for Russ & Eddy, manufacturers of millwork. He was soon joined there by his elder brother, George H. Cutting, who would become a successful general contractor in Worcester. While working as a carpenter, Cutting studied architecture in his spare time.

In 1868 Cutting opened an architects' office in Worcester. From c. 1876 to c. 1878 he worked in partnership with John E. Holman under the name Cutting & Holman, and from 1890 to c. 1891 with Walter R. Forbush under the name Cutting & Forbush. In 1895 he organized a third and final partnership with Elbridge S. Carleton and Frank H. Cutting, his son, under the name Cutting, Carleton & Cutting.

Over his nearly thirty years in professional practice, Cutting designed many churches, public buildings, office buildings and private homes. At the time of his death, the recently completed New Hampshire State Library (1895) and the Kellogg-Hubbard Library (1896) in Montpelier, Vermont, were considered his exceptional works. He unsuccessfully participated in the 1895 architectural design competition for the Worcester City Hall.

In 1887 Cutting joined the Western Association of Architects (WAA); he was one of the organization's easternmost members. In 1889 the WAA merged with the American Institute of Architects (AIA), and Cutting, like all members, was made a Fellow. In 1892 he was a founding member of the former Worcester chapter.

== Personal life ==
Cutting was married in 1868 to Lora Jennie Smith of Worcester. They had ten children, five sons and five daughters, seven of whom lived to adulthood.

In his 50s Cutting's health declined, and he spent the winters of 1894–95 and 1895–96 in Los Angeles in search of better health. He died there February 6, 1896, at the age of 56.

== Legacy ==
Cutting's firm continued under the name Cutting, Carleton & Cutting until Carleton's death in 1932. Frank H. Cutting continued to practice and died in 1957.

Worcester architects C. Leslie Chamberlain and Walter B. Nourse of the notable firms of Frost, Briggs & Chamberlain and Barker & Nourse worked for Cutting. J. William Patston, architect of the Quinsigamond Firehouse and other buildings, also worked for Cutting.

At least seven of Cutting's works have been listed on the United States National Register of Historic Places, in addition to four by Cutting, Carleton & Cutting. Others contribute to listed historic districts.

== Architectural works ==
All dates are date of completion.

=== A. P. Cutting, 1868–1876, 1878–1890 and 1891–1895 ===
- 1872 – Dresser House, (Note: Demolished.) 72 Main St, Southbridge, Massachusetts
- 1872 – Grace Methodist Episcopal Church, Walnut St, Worcester, Massachusetts
- 1874 – Methodist Episcopal Church of Hyde Park, Central Ave and Winthrop St, Hyde Park, Boston
- 1874 – Plymouth Congregational Church, Pearl and Chestnut Sts, Worcester, Massachusetts
- 1874 – Franklin Wesson House, (Note: NRHP-listed.) 8 Claremont St, Worcester, Massachusetts
- 1875 – Warren First Congregational Church-Federated Church, 25 Winthrop Ter, Warren, Massachusetts
- 1876 – First Congregational Church, (Note: Substantially rebuilt after a 1935 fire.) 177 N Main St, Concord, New Hampshire
- 1879 – Uxbridge Town Hall, 21 S Main St, Uxbridge, Massachusetts
- 1881 – Hotel Wilson, (Note: A contributing resource to the Uxbridge Common District, NRHP-listed in 1984.) 6 N Main St, Uxbridge, Massachusetts
- 1883 – First Congregational Church, 2 Main St, Hopkinton, Massachusetts
- 1885 – Leicester Inn, 1019 N Main St, Leicester, Massachusetts
- 1885 – New Hampshire Savings Bank Building, (Note: A contributing resource to the Downtown Concord Historic District, NRHP-listed in 2000.) 116 N Main St, Concord, New Hampshire
- 1885 – William H. Sawyer house, 107 Lincoln St, Worcester, Massachusetts
- 1887 – J. Frank Quinn house, 900 Main St, Worcester, Massachusetts
- 1888 – Frederick G. Davis house, 78 Burncoat St, Worcester, Massachusetts
- 1888 – Southbridge Town Hall, 41 Elm St, Southbridge, Massachusetts
- 1889 – David Prouty High School (former), (Note: A contributing resource to the Spencer Town Center Historic District, NRHP-listed in 1986.) 195 Main St, Spencer, Massachusetts
- 1890 – George H. Cutting house, (Note: A contributing resource to the Lincoln Estate–Elm Park Historic District, NRHP-listed in 1980.) 67 Cedar St, Worcester, Massachusetts
- 1890 – Eagle Hotel remodeling, 110 N Main St, Concord, New Hampshire
- 1890 – First Congregational Church, Main and School Sts, Newport, Vermont
- 1890 – Warren Public Library, 934 Main St, Warren, Massachusetts
- 1891 – Trinity Methodist Episcopal Church, 69 Main St, New Britain, Connecticut
- 1891 – YMCA, (Note: Demolished. Formerly a contributing resource to the Newburyport Historic District, NRHP-listed in 1984.) 96 State St, Newburyport, Massachusetts
- 1892 – New Hampshire Centennial Home for the Aged (former), 96 Pleasant St, Concord, New Hampshire
- 1893 – Charlton City United Methodist Church (former), 16 Stafford St, Charlton, Massachusetts
- 1893 – Harvard-Epworth United Methodist Church, (Note: A contributing resource to the Cambridge Common Historic District, NRHP-listed in 1973.) 1555 Massachusetts Ave, Cambridge, Massachusetts
- 1893 – Wesley United Methodist Church, (Note: A contributing resource to the Waterbury Village Historic District, NRHP-listed in 1978.) 56 S Main St, Waterbury, Vermont
- 1894 – First Congregational Church, 1 Concord St, Nashua, New Hampshire
- 1894 – Northborough Free Library, 34 Main St, Northborough, Massachusetts
- 1895 – New Hampshire State Library, (Note: A contributing resource to the Concord Civic District, NRHP-listed in 1983.) 20 Park St, Concord, New Hampshire
- 1896 – Kellogg-Hubbard Library, 135 Main St, Montpelier, Vermont

=== Cutting & Holman, 1876–1878 ===
- 1876 – Lyman School for Boys expansion, (Note: Converted into Westborough State Hospital in 1886, demolished in 2019. Formerly NRHP-listed.) Lyman St, Westborough, Massachusetts
- 1876 – Addison Macullar house, 2 Oread St, Worcester, Massachusetts
- 1880 – Millbury Town Hall, 95 Elm St, Millbury, Massachusetts
- 1882 – George M. Kimball house, 266 N Main St, Concord, New Hampshire

=== Cutting & Forbush, 1890–1891 ===
- 1890 – Daniel N. Bates house, 66 Cedar St, Worcester, Massachusetts
- 1891 – Lothrop's Opera House, (Note: A contributing resource to the Lower Pleasant Street District, NRHP-listed in 1980.) 17 Pleasant St, Worcester, Massachusetts

=== Cutting, Carleton & Cutting, 1895–1932 ===
- 1896 – Gilman Block, (Note: Demolished, formerly NRHP-listed.) 215 Main St, Worcester, Massachusetts
- 1896 – Mathewson Street United Methodist Church, (Note: A contributing resource to the Downtown Providence Historic District, NRHP-listed in 1984.) 134 Mathewson St, Providence, Rhode Island
- 1898 – Fogg Library, 1 Columbian Sq, South Weymouth, Massachusetts
- 1901 – Dudley Free Public Library (former), 1 Village St, Dudley, Massachusetts
- 1903 – Oxford Free Public Library, (Note: A contributing resource to the Oxford Main Street Historic District, NRHP-listed in 1984.) 339 Main St, Oxford, Massachusetts
- 1904 – Hanover Theatre for the Performing Arts, 2 Southbridge St, Worcester, Massachusetts
- 1907 – Oxford High School (former), 351 Main St, Oxford, Massachusetts
- 1908 – Ralph L. Morgan house, 96 William St, Worcester, Massachusetts
- 1909 – Tatnuck School, 1083 Pleasant St, Worcester, Massachusetts
- 1910 – Rochdale School, 1098 Stafford St, Leicester, Massachusetts
- 1914 – Hillswold Farm, (Note: Now the Hebert Candy Mansion.) the Edmund E. Hills estate, 575 Hartford Tpk, Shrewsbury, Massachusetts
- 1924 – Hadley Furniture Company Building, 657 Main St, Worcester, Massachusetts
- 1927 – May Street School, 265 May St, Worcester, Massachusetts
- 1929 – Lincoln Street School, 549 Lincoln St, Worcester, Massachusetts
