= Pleasant Street =

Pleasant Street may refer to:

- Pleasant Street incline, a former subway portal in Boston
  - Pleasant Street station (BERy), a former rapid transit station located at the portal
- Pleasant Street station (MBTA), a former light rail station in Boston
- Pleasant Street station (BRB&L), a former station on the Boston, Revere Beach and Lynn Railroad in Winthrop, Massachusetts
- Pleasant Street station (B&M), a former station on the Boston and Maine Railroad Stoneham Branch in Stoneham, Massachusetts
- Pleasant Street Congregational Church, a historic church in Arlington, Massachusetts, United States
- Pleasant Street (Yarmouth, Maine), a street in Yarmouth, Maine, U.S.

== See also ==
- Pleasant Street Historic District (disambiguation)
- Pleasant Street School (disambiguation)
