= Pleasant Street Historic District =

Pleasant Street Historic District may refer to:

in the United States

(by state then city)

- Pleasant Street Historic District (Hot Springs, Arkansas), listed on the NRHP in Arkansas
- Pleasant Street Historic District (Gainesville, Florida), listed on the NRHP in Florida
- West Pleasant Street Historic District, Maquoketa, IA, listed on the NRHP in Iowa
- Pleasant Street Historic District (Belmont, Massachusetts), listed on the NRHP in Massachusetts
- Pleasant Street Historic District (Marlborough, Massachusetts), listed on the NRHP in Massachusetts
- Crystal Lake and Pleasant Street Historic District, Newton, MA, listed on the NRHP in Massachusetts
- Lower Pleasant Street District, Worcester, MA, listed on the NRHP in Massachusetts

== See also ==
- Pleasant Street School (disambiguation)
- Pleasant-School Street Historic District
