= Grove Street School =

- U.S. National Register of Historic Places
- U.S. Historic district – Contributing property
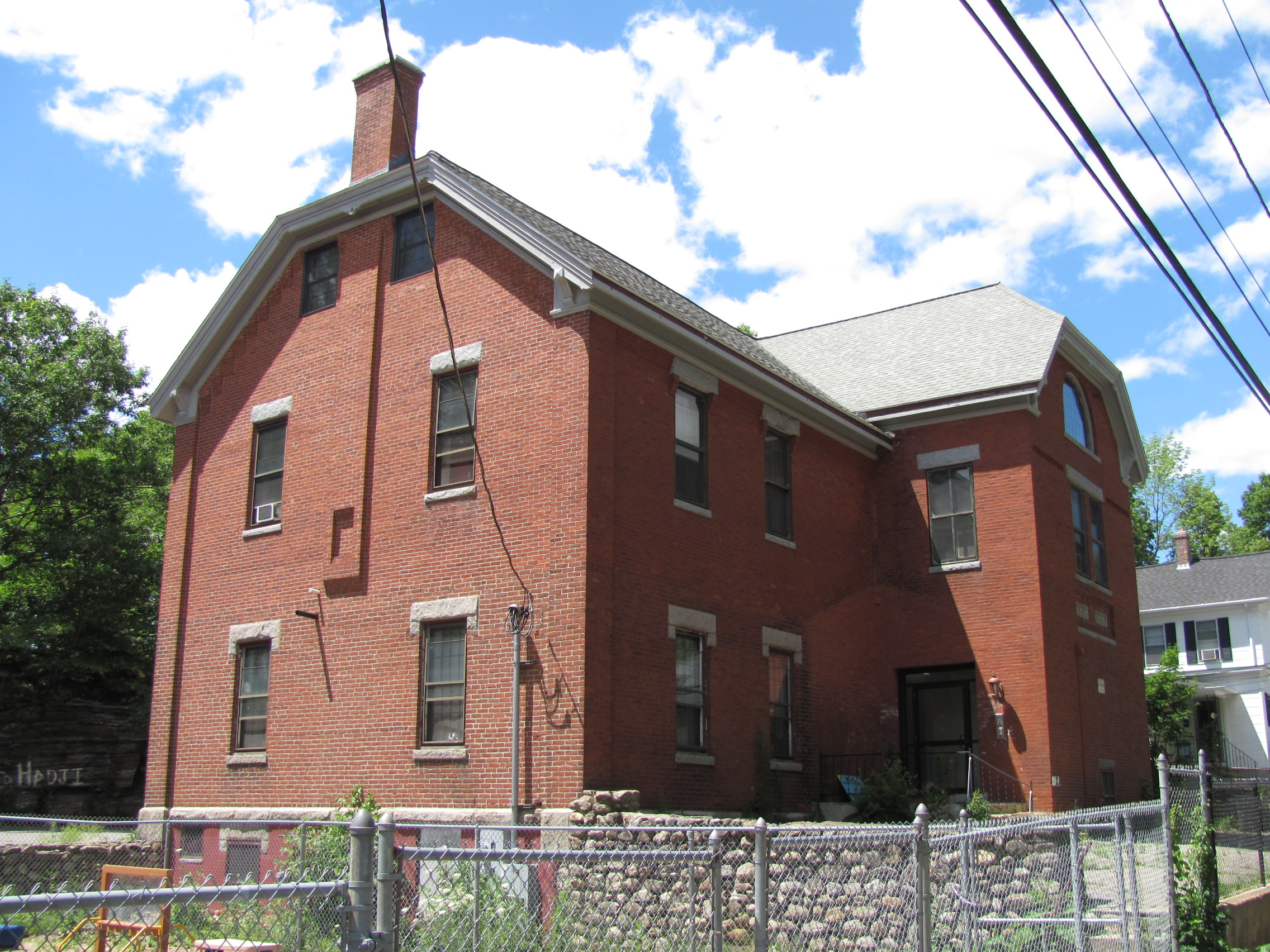
- Grove Street School

- Location within Massachusetts Location within the United States
- Location: Spencer, Massachusetts
- Coordinates: 42°14′49″N 71°59′32″W
- Built: 1876
- Architect: Frank Moses; Fuller & Delano
- Architectural style: Late Victorian
- Part of: Spencer Town Center Historic District (ID03000685)
- NRHP reference No.: 96000737

Significant dates
- Added to NRHP: July 5, 1996
- Designated CP: July 25, 2003

The Grove Street School is a historic school building at 23 Grove Street in Spencer, Massachusetts. The 2 1/2-story brick building was built in two phases: in the first phase in 1876, a single story was built. It was full to overflowing by 1878, and in 1883 the second story was built, designed by Fuller & Delano. It is a T-shaped building, whose main body is a horizontal rectangle, with a projecting central pavilion. The three roof gable ends are jerkin-headed, and are decorated with bargeboard and heavy brackets.

The building was added to the National Register of Historic Places in 1996, and was included in the 2003 expansion of the Spencer Town Center Historic District.

== See also ==
- National Register of Historic Places listings in Worcester County, Massachusetts
