= Warren Public Library =

Warren Public Library may refer to:

- Warren Public Library (Warren, Massachusetts), listed on the NRHP in Massachusetts
- Warren Public Library (Warren, Ohio), listed on the National Register of Historic Places in Trumbull County, Ohio
