= John Legg House =

Historic house in Massachusetts, United States

- U.S. National Register of Historic Places
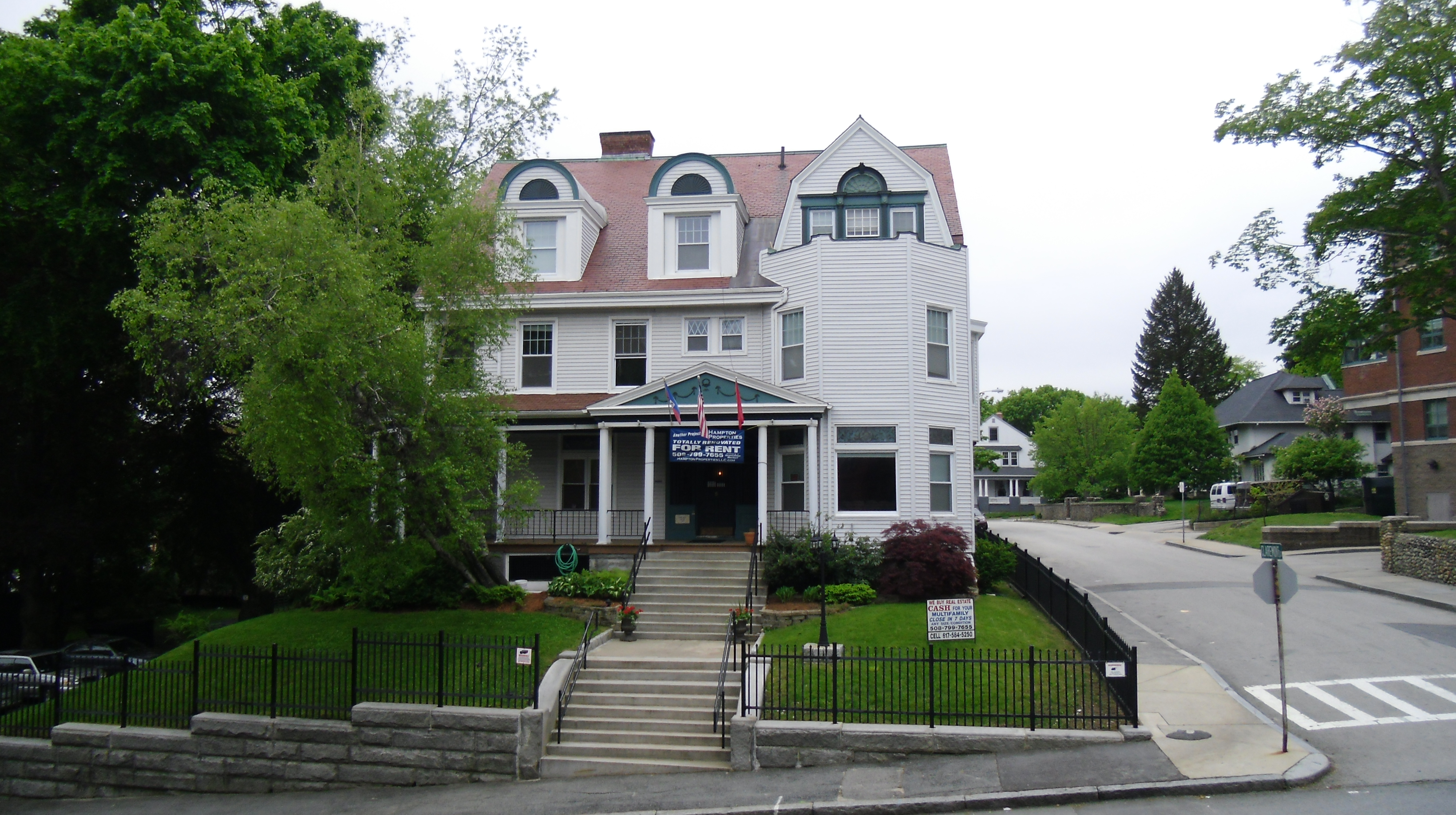
- The John Legg House in May 2011

- Location within Massachusetts Location within the United States
- Location: 5 Claremont St., Worcester, Massachusetts
- Coordinates: 42°15′14″N 71°49′3″W
- Built: 1896
- Architect: Earle, Stephen
- Architectural style: Queen Anne
- MPS: Worcester MRA
- NRHP reference No.: 80000623
- Added to NRHP: March 05, 1980

The John Legg House is a historic house at 5 Claremont Street in Worcester, Massachusetts. The Queen Anne style house was built in 1892 to a design by noted local architect Stephen Earle for John Legg, owner of the Worcester Woolens Company, one of the city's largest textile businesses. It is a 2 1/2-story wood-frame with an asymmetrical plan. One unusual feature is a first floor bay on the right side which is topped by a parapet. The center and left side of the house are sheltered by a porch, with a decorated gable end over the stairs.

The house was listed on the National Register of Historic Places in 1980. Since the listing, some of the exterior features have been lost due to a later residing of the house.

== See also ==
- Franklin Wesson House, 8 Claremont Street, also owned by a major Worcester businessman
- National Register of Historic Places listings in southwestern Worcester, Massachusetts
- National Register of Historic Places listings in Worcester County, Massachusetts
