= Hadley Furniture Company Building =

- U.S. National Register of Historic Places
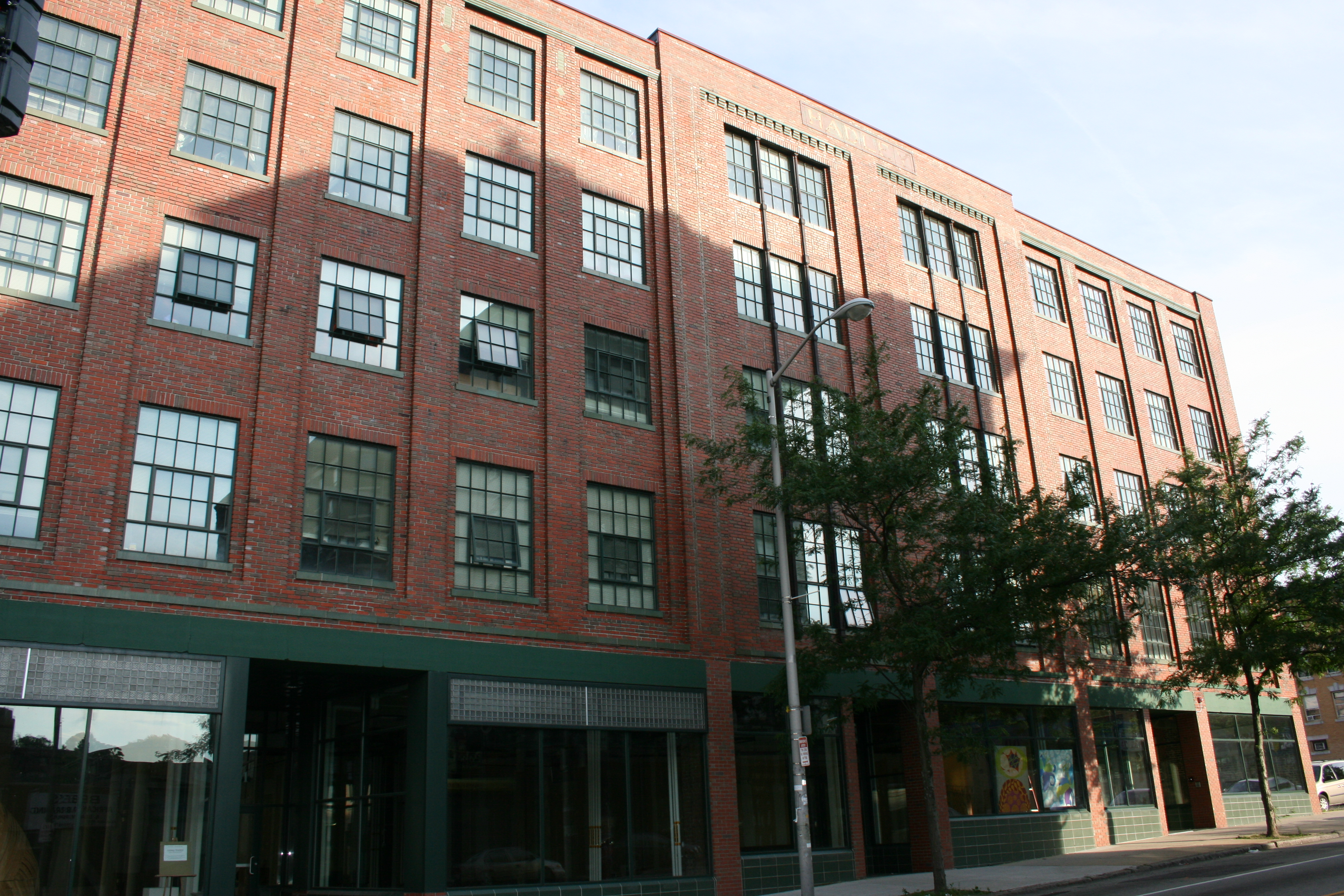

- Location within Massachusetts Location within the United States
- Location: 651-659 Main St., Worcester, Massachusetts
- Coordinates: 42°15′34″N 71°48′19″W
- Built: 1923-24
- Architect: Cutting, Carleton & Cutting
- Architectural style: Colonial Revival
- NRHP reference No.: 11000068
- Added to NRHP: March 1, 2011

The Hadley Furniture Company Building is a historic retail building at 651-659 Main Street in downtown Worcester, Massachusetts. The five story brick building was built in 1923–24 to a design by the local architectural firm of Cutting, Carleton & Cutting. The Hadley Furniture Company, founded in 1914, sought to expand from earlier premises closer to City Hall, and commissioned its construction. As a representative of a significant specialty retail presence in the city, and for its architectural styling, it was listed on the National Register of Historic Places in 2011.

== See also ==
- National Register of Historic Places listings in southwestern Worcester, Massachusetts
- National Register of Historic Places listings in Worcester County, Massachusetts
