= Trinity Methodist Episcopal Church (New Britain, Connecticut) =

Historic church in Connecticut, United States

- U.S. National Register of Historic Places
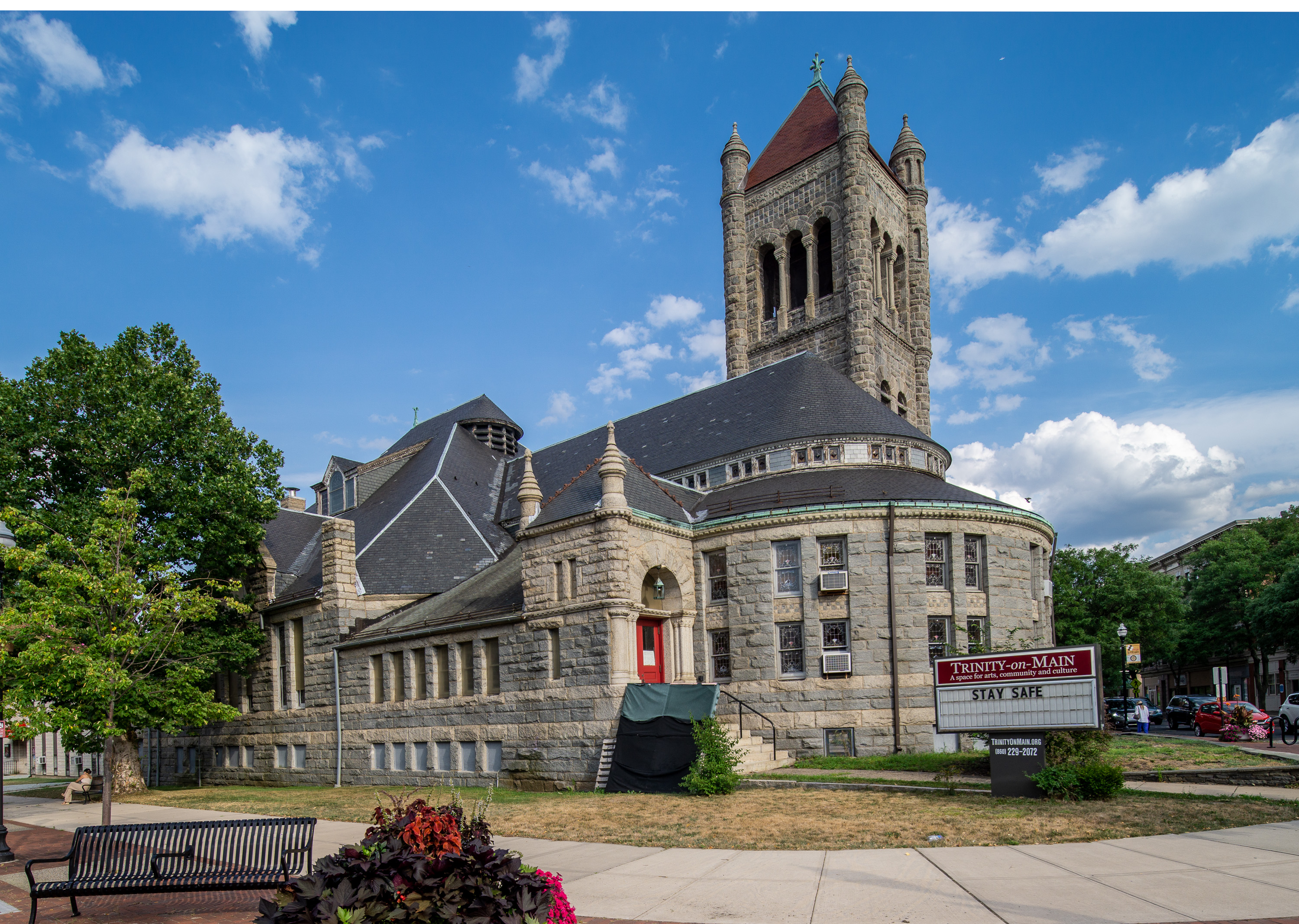

- Location within Connecticut Location within the United States
- Location: 69 Main Street, New Britain, Connecticut
- Coordinates: 41°39′56″N 72°46′51″W
- Area: 0.4 acres (0.16 ha)
- Architect: Amos P. Cutting; Alexander Dallas
- Architectural style: Romanesque
- NRHP reference No.: 07000697
- Added to NRHP: July 21, 2007

Trinity Methodist Episcopal Church is a historic former church building at 69 Main Street in New Britain, Connecticut. Built in 1891 to a design by Amos P. Cutting, it is a distinctive local example of Richardsonian Romanesque architecture. Now a performing arts venue known as Trinity-on-Main, it was listed on the National Register of Historic Places in 2007.

== Description and history ==
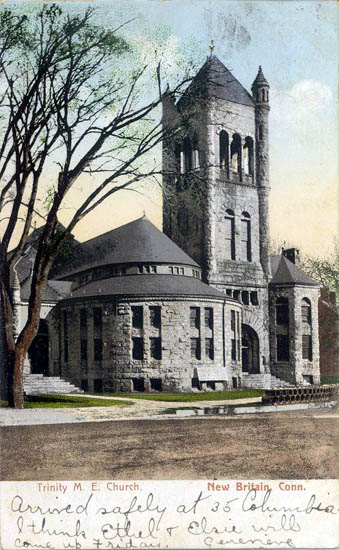
Postcard ca 1907

The former Trinity Church is located in downtown New Britain, at the southeast corner of Main and Chestnut Streets. It is a large stone structure, built of granite and slate, on an Akron Plan design, with Richardsonian Romanesque style. It is particularly distinguished for its polychrome uses of both granite and slate to create distinctive effects. The facade facing Main Street presents a rounded apse on the left, and a square tower on the right, with corner turrets and a pyramidal roof.

The first Methodist congregation in New Britain was organized in 1816, but did not acquire a permanent home until 1828, apparently due to local hostility. The first sanctuary was replaced due to rising membership in 1855, and by the 1880s the replacement was again judged too small. The present church was completed in 1891, and was a major work late in the career of the notable architect Amos P. Cutting. Membership peaked in the early 1950s, suffering thereafter due in part to the city's urban renewal efforts, which destroyed surrounding residential areas. Unable to maintain the large building, the congregation decided to demolish it in 2000. It was rescued from that fate by local preservationists, and has been converted into a performing arts space.

== See also ==
- National Register of Historic Places listings in Hartford County, Connecticut
