= Uxbridge Town Hall =

- U.S. National Register of Historic Places
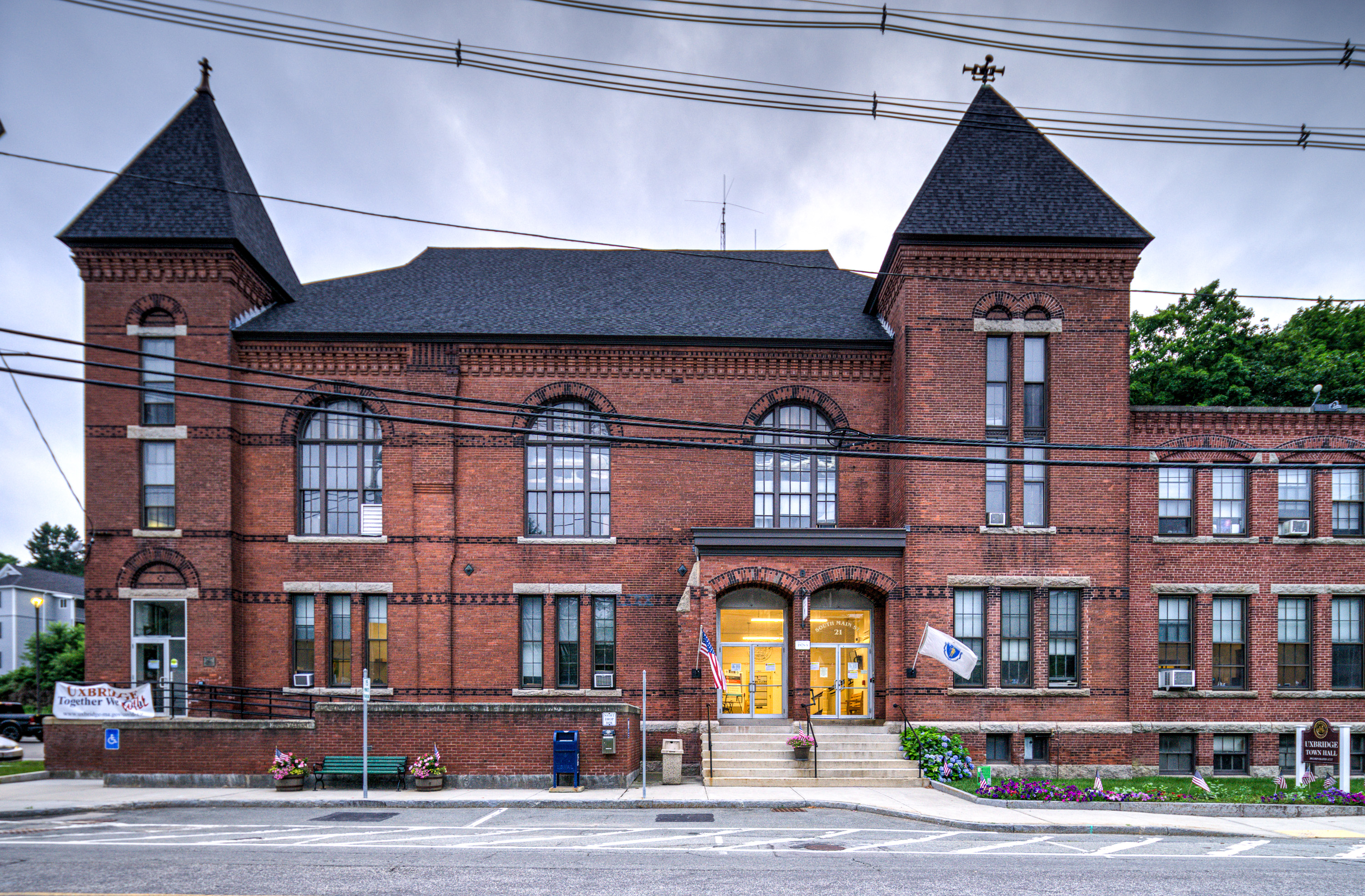
- Uxbridge Town Hall in 2020
- Location: 45 S. Main St. Uxbridge, Massachusetts
- Coordinates: 42.0753°N 71.62883°W
- Built: 1879
- Architect: Amos P. Cutting
- MPS: Uxbridge MRA
- NRHP reference No.: 83004144
- Added to NRHP: October 7, 1983

Uxbridge Town Hall is the town hall of Uxbridge, Massachusetts, located at 45 South Main Street. It is listed on the National Register of Historic Places. It was built in 1879 and added to the historic registry 100 years later. Amos P. Cutting of Worcester was the architect. Ferry & Gardner of Springfield also submitted plans.

An old burial ground had to be relocated to build the town hall. It continues to serve as the administrative headquarters for the town government. In the 1930s its auditorium showed movies, and live bands played here for weekend entertainment. Until recent times it also served as the police headquarters. It was listed on the National Register of Historic Places in 1983.

== See also ==
- National Register of Historic Places listings in Uxbridge, Massachusetts
