= Southbridge Town Hall =

- U.S. National Register of Historic Places
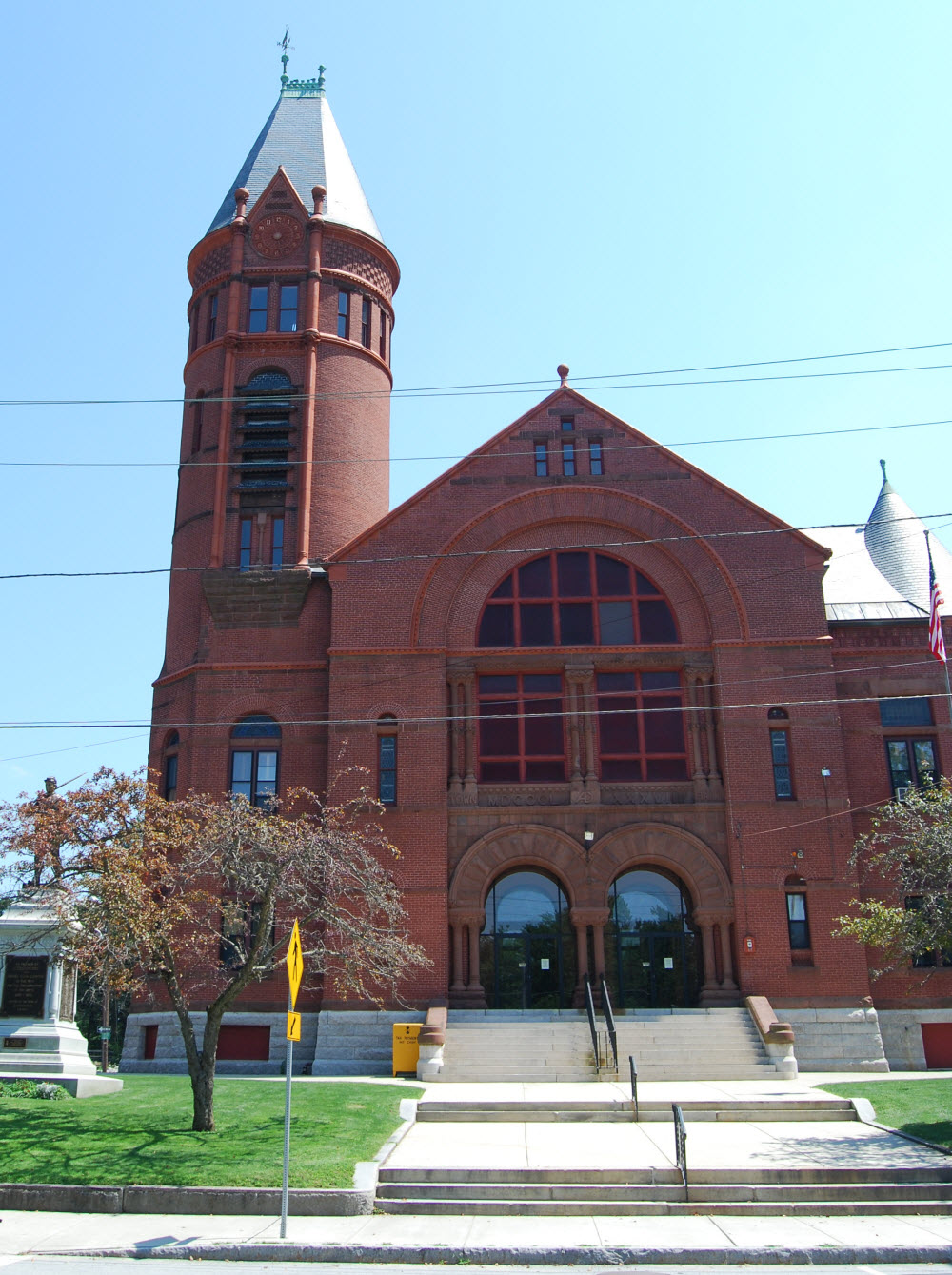

- Location within Massachusetts Location within the United States
- Location: 41 Elm St., Southbridge, Massachusetts
- Coordinates: 42°4′23″N 72°2′5″W
- Built: 1888
- Architect: Amos P. Cutting
- Architectural style: Romanesque
- NRHP reference No.: 87001378
- Added to NRHP: November 20, 1987

Southbridge Town Hall is an historic town hall at 41 Elm Street in Southbridge, Massachusetts. The imposing Romanesque Revival building was built in 1888 to serve as both the town hall and the public high school. It is the only major Romanesque building to survive in Southbridge. and was listed on the National Register of Historic Places in 1987.

== History ==
At the time of its construction, the town had been considering separate buildings to function as town hall and high school, replacing the single Greek Revival building that was serving both purposes (on the site of the present town hall). The town eventually decided, as a cost-saving measure, to build the single building, which served both purposes until a dedicated high school was built in 1927. Classrooms and town offices occupied the first floor, and a large meeting space was on the second floor. The interior underwent some renovations in the 1970s.

== Architecture ==
The exterior of the building has typical Romanesque styling, with massive stone blocks, large arches, and textured ornamental brickwork. The massing is asymmetrical, with a round clocktower on the left. The entranceway features a two-story arched brick surround over a pair of doorways, each of which is itself surrounded by a stone block arch supported by twin columns.

During the period of the Romanesque Revival's popularity, three buildings were built in Southbridge. The other two, a bank building and the YMCA, are no longer standing. The town hall is now its only surviving example of this style.

== See also ==
- National Register of Historic Places listings in Southbridge, Massachusetts
- National Register of Historic Places listings in Worcester County, Massachusetts
