= Gilman Block =

- U.S. National Register of Historic Places
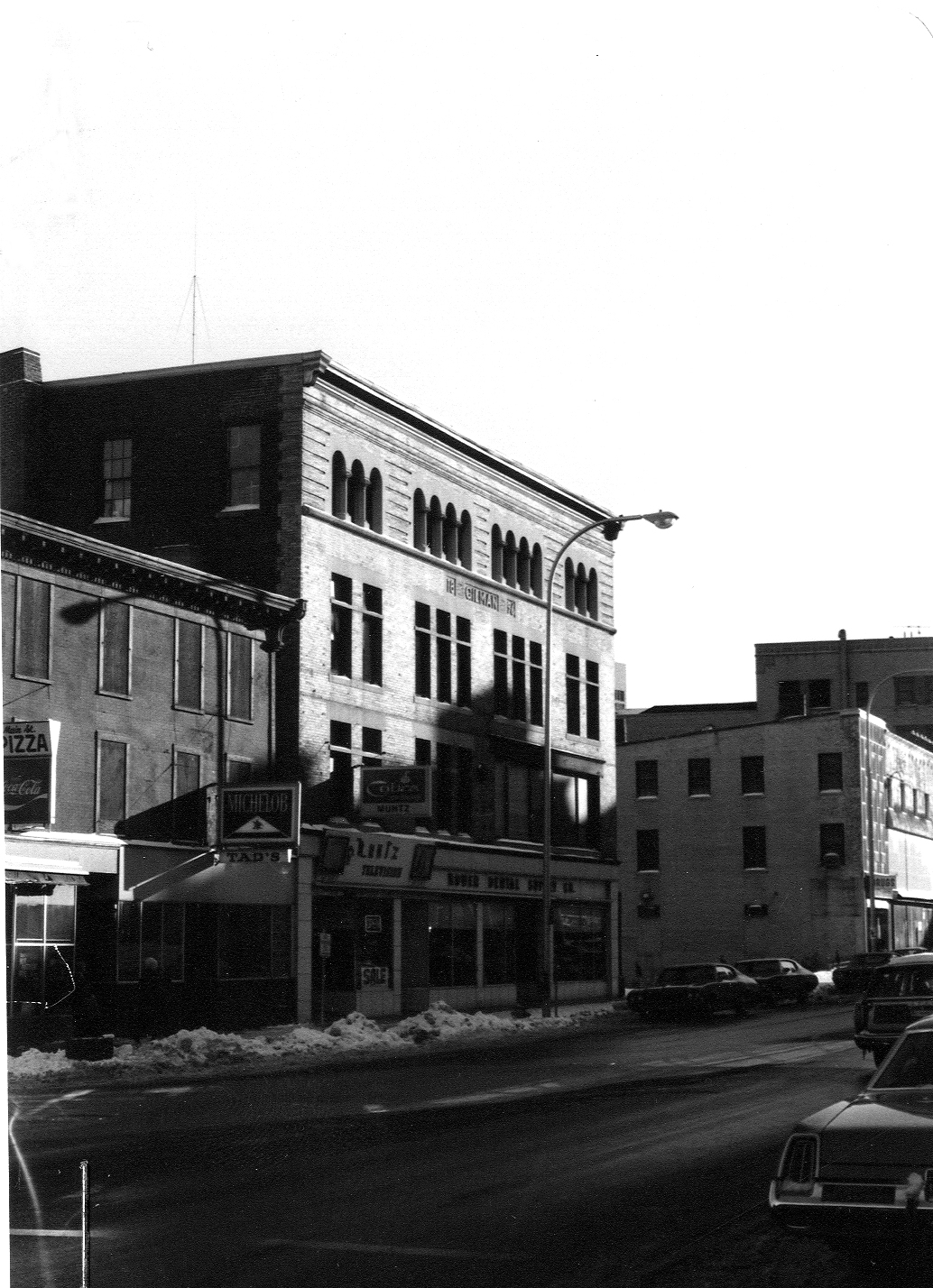
- c. 1977 photo

- Location within Massachusetts Location within the United States
- Location: 207-219 Main St., Worcester, Massachusetts
- Coordinates: 42°16′3″N 71°48′3″W
- Area: less than one acre
- Built: 1896
- Built by: J. W. Bishop & Company
- Architect: Cutting, Carleton & Cutting
- Architectural style: Classical Revival
- NRHP reference No.: 00001342
- Added to NRHP: November 20, 2000

The Gilman Block was a historic commercial building at 207-219 Main Street in Worcester, Massachusetts. Built in 1896, it was a distinguished local example of Classical Revival and Romanesque styling, reflective of the city's rapid growth in the late 19th century. The building was acquired by the state and demolished in 2004 to provide space for a new courthouse. The courthouse incorporates a part of the facade of the building and has an exposition of its history. It had been listed on the National Register of Historic Places in 2000,

== Description and history ==
The Gilman Block was located on the east side of Main Street in downtown Worcester, between Thomas Street and Martin Luther King Jr. Boulevard. It was a four-story brick building, with Classical Revival and Romanesque/Tuscan Mediterranean influence. It had round-arch windows on the top floor, and a pressed copper cornice adorned with brackets at the corners.

The block was built in 1896 to a design by the local architectural firm of Cutting, Carleton & Cutting. It was built for Moses Gilman, a local businessman, to replace another commercial building, and to house a baking and confectionery business. The ground floor housed two storefronts, while the bakery operation was housed in the basement, and the confectionery business on the upper two floors. By 1904, that business had failed, and the building was subsequently used by a variety of commercial interests. Some of its larger spaces were used by the churches of immigrant groups as worship spaces, particularly those from Scandinavia. Its commercial uses fell off in the 1970s, and it housed nightclubs for a time. When it was listed on the National Register in 2000, it was the only building left on its block.

== See also ==
- National Register of Historic Places listings in northwestern Worcester, Massachusetts
- National Register of Historic Places listings in Worcester County, Massachusetts
