= Pleasant Street School (Spencer, Massachusetts) =

- U.S. National Register of Historic Places
- U.S. Historic district – Contributing property
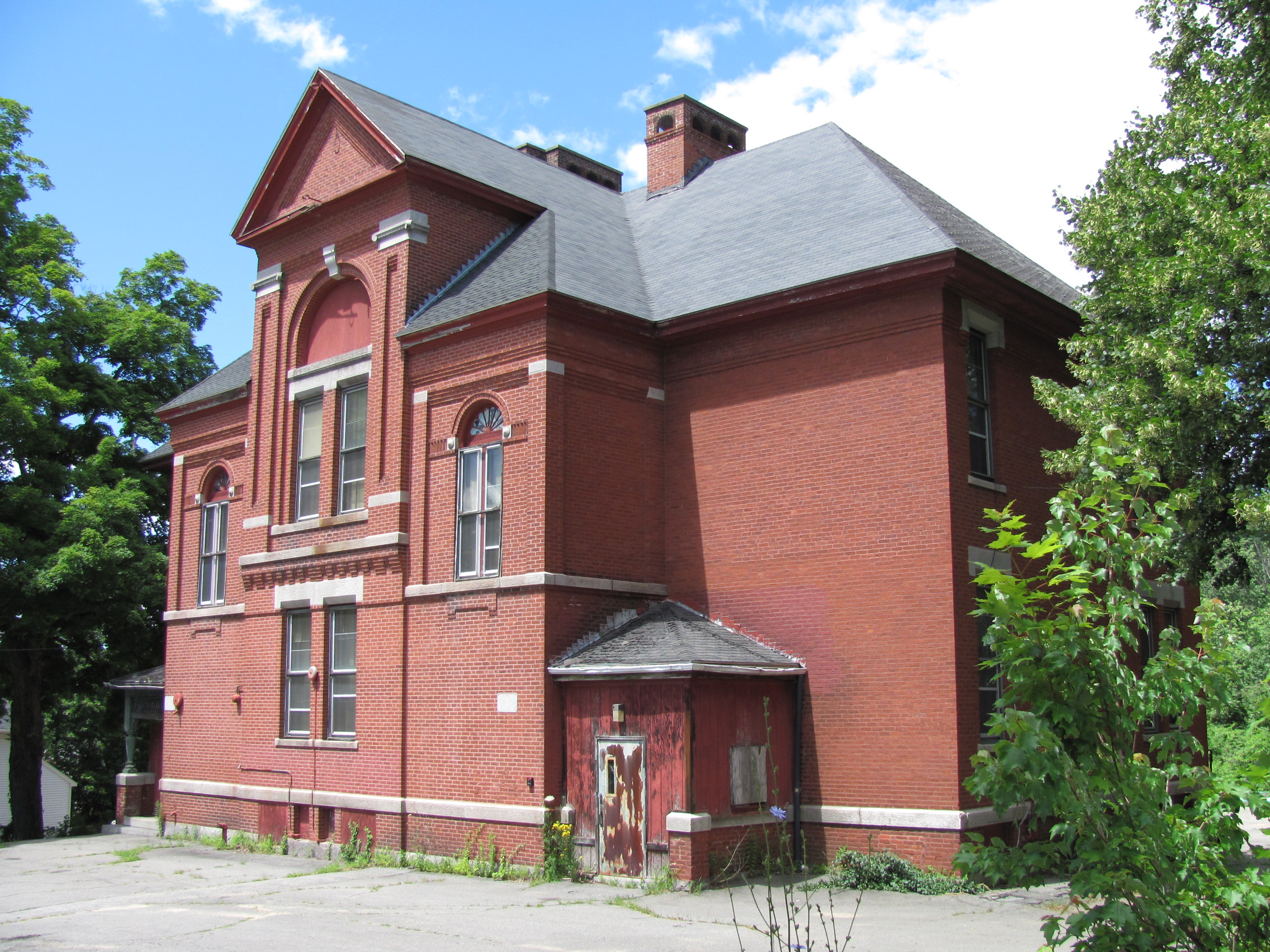

- Location within Massachusetts Location within the United States
- Location: 54 Pleasant Street, Spencer, Massachusetts
- Coordinates: 42°14′54″N 71°59′51″W
- Part of: Spencer Town Center Historic District (ID03000685)
- NRHP reference No.: 96000736

Significant dates
- Added to NRHP: July 5, 1996
- Designated CP: July 25, 2003

The Pleasant Street School was an historic school building at 54 Pleasant Street in Spencer, Massachusetts. The two story Victorial Eclectic brick building was designed by the Worcester firm of Fuller & Delano, and built in 1883 by J. D. Morton. It followed a cruciform plan, with a large pavilion projecting from the main facade. The paired main entrances (one for boys, one for girls) were on the sides of this projecting section.

The building was listed on the National Register of Historic Places in 1996, and was included in the 2003 expansion of the Spencer Town Center Historic District.

The building had a preservation restriction on it held by the Spencer Historical Society. In 2018, the town voted to appropriate funding to demolish the building, which was done the following year.

== See also ==
- National Register of Historic Places listings in Worcester County, Massachusetts
