= Warren Public Library (Warren, Massachusetts) =

- U.S. National Register of Historic Places
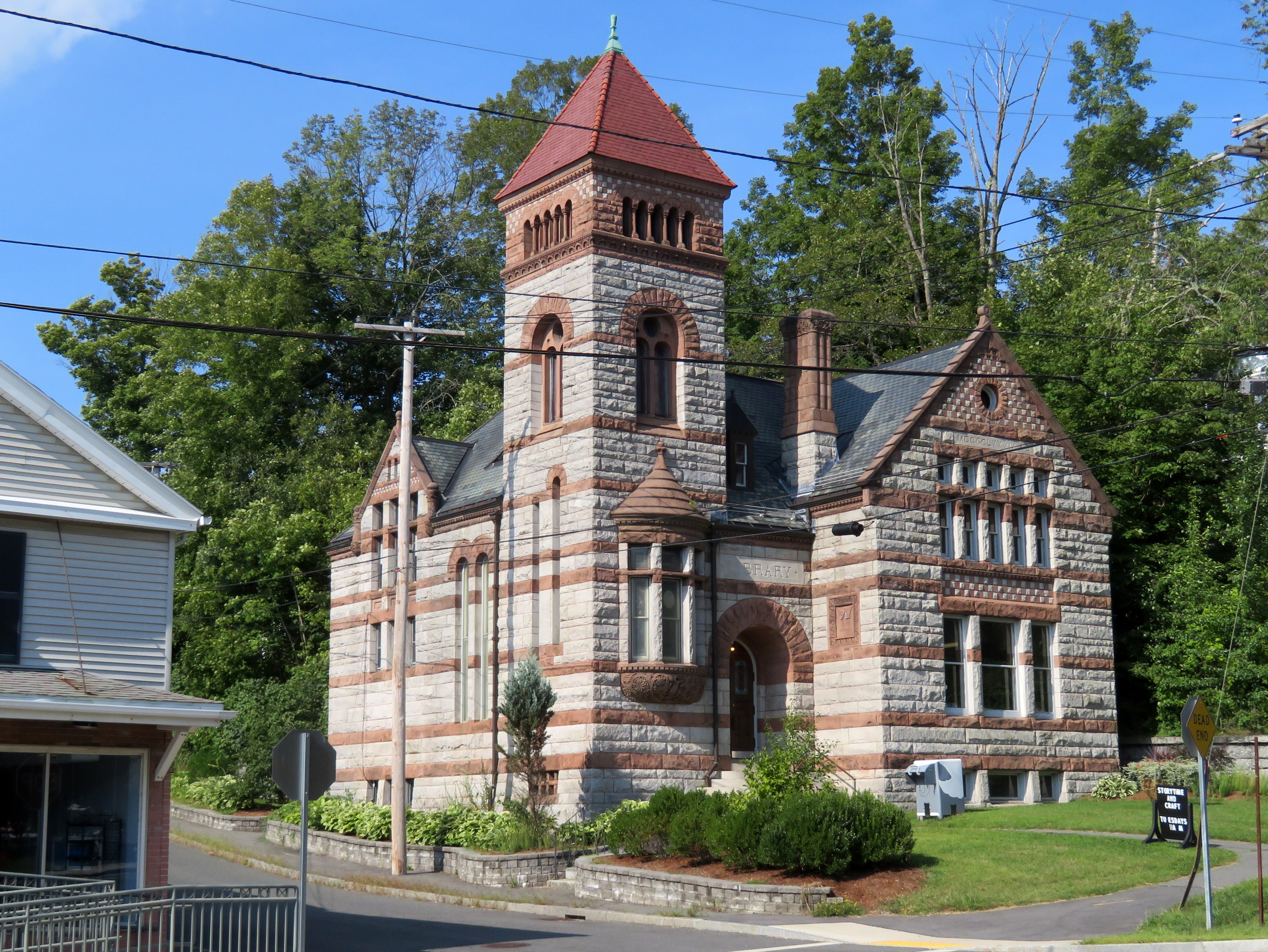
- Warren Public Library in August 2018

- Location within Massachusetts Location within the United States
- Location: Warren, Massachusetts
- Coordinates: 42°12′48.6″N 72°11′34.6″W
- Built: 1889
- Architect: Amos P. Cutting; Patrick Breston
- Architectural style: Romanesque
- NRHP reference No.: 00000146
- Added to NRHP: March 13, 2000

The Warren Public Library is the public library of Warren, Massachusetts, It is located at 934 Main Street, in a Richardsonial Romanesque building designed by Amos P. Cutting and built in 1889. The building was listed on the National Register of Historic Places in 2000.

== Architecture and history ==
The library is set on the north side of Main Street (Massachusetts Routes 19 and 67), just east of the town's central business district and west of the town common. It is a 2 1/2-story structure, built of granite with brownstone trim, with a slate roof and a granite foundation. Its front facade is asymmetrically arranged into three sections, with a three-story pyramidally-roofed tower on the left, the main entrance in the center, and a large projecting gable section on the right. Courses of granite are periodically interspersed with bands of brownstone that extend across and around the building. The tower has a projecting bay window, above which is a round-arch opening with a pair of round-arch windows within, topped by an oculus. An arcade of small arched openings bands across the tower between that opening and the roof.

The Warren Public Library was chartered in 1876, and first opened to the public in 1879 in rooms of the town hall. Rapidly outgrowing that space, a fund drive was held to fund the construction of a dedicated building, which resulted in the construction of this building on land donated by Wilson H. Fairbank in 1889. The building was designed by Amos P. Cutting, who had previously designed the nearby Congregational Church.

The original building plan called for the upstairs to be used as a meeting hall for lectures and civic events. It was instead decided to use space there for a museum, and display cases were purchased at an early date to fulfil this role. The stacks were eventually expanded into the space as well, but it was closed off during World War II as an energy conservation measure, and not reopened until 2001.

== See also ==
- National Register of Historic Places listings in Worcester County, Massachusetts
