= Hanover Theatre and Conservancy for the Performing Arts =

Theater in Worcester, Massachusetts, United States

Coordinates: 42.261089°N 71.803084°W

The Hanover Theatre and Conservatory for the Performing Arts
- The Hanover Theatre, The Hanover Theatre and Conservatory, The Hanover Theatre Conservatory
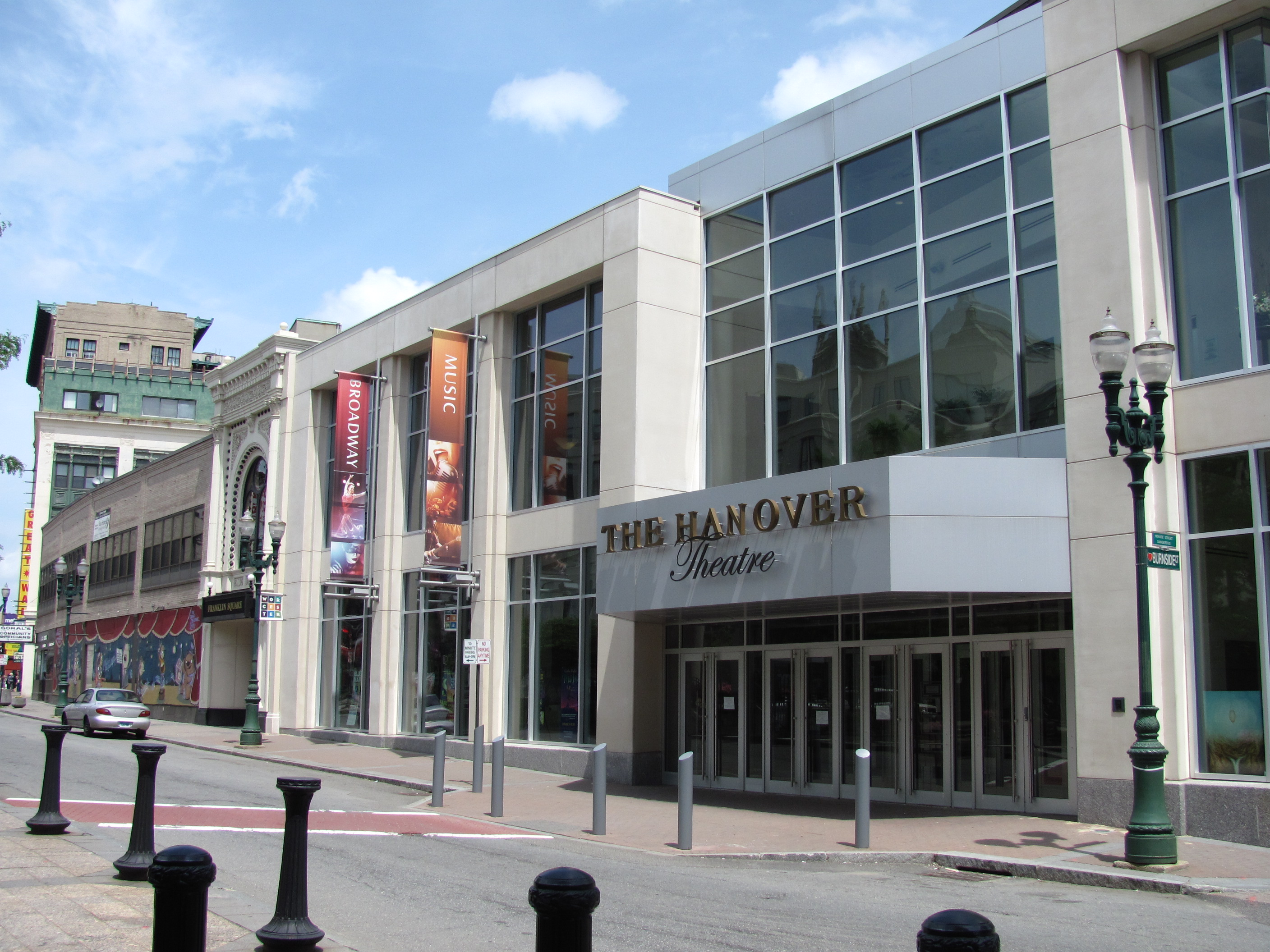
- Hanover Theatre & Conservatory for the Performing Arts, main entrance near camera, original entrance in distance (near car)
- Interactive map of The Hanover Theatre and Conservatory for the Performing Arts
- Address: 2 Southbridge Street; Worcester, Massachusetts; United States
- Owner: Worcester Center for Performing Arts
- Capacity: 2,300
- Current use: Touring acts

Construction
- Opened: Franklin Square Theatre 1904; The Grand 1926
- Rebuilt: 2008
- Architects: Cutting, Carleton & Cutting; Thomas W. Lamb

Website
- www.thehanovertheatre.org
- Poli's Palace Theater
- U.S. National Register of Historic Places
- Location: Worcester, MA
- Built: 1902–1904
- Architect: Cutting, Carleton & Cutting; Thomas W. Lamb
- Architectural style: Renaissance
- NRHP reference No.: 10001122
- Added to NRHP: January 10, 2011

The Hanover Theatre and Conservatory for the Performing Arts is a complex in Worcester, Massachusetts, that includes an auditorium, where touring acts perform regularly, and several classrooms that host classes relating to the arts.

The theatre was originally built in 1904 as the Franklin Square Theatre and regularly scheduled burlesque shows, Broadway touring shows and headline acts. It transitioned to showing silent films by 1912 when vaudeville magnate Sylvester Poli purchased the theatre from the estate of Pauline L. Taylor.

== History ==
Opened in 1904, the Franklin Square Theatre was designed in 1902 by the local architectural firm of Cutting, Carleton & Cutting. It was commissioned by Ramsom C. Taylor, a prominent Worcester real estate developer.

Upon its sale, Poli remodeled the theatre, renamed it The Grand, and continued to show silent movies. In 1926 he hired renowned theatre designer Thomas W. Lamb, doubled the theatre's seating capacity to 3,500 and transformed the building into a palatial showcase, including a two-story lobby with mirrored walls, marbleized columns, an ornate grand staircase, and an immense chandelier in the main auditorium, just in time for the beginning of sound film, or the talkies in 1927.

In 1928, Poli sold his theatre holdings to William Fox who then renamed it the Loew's Poli. After another change of ownership, Sumner Redstone and Redstone Theaters purchased the building in 1967 opening it as Showcase Cinemas and continued operations as a multiscreen movie house until 1998 when Redstone's National Amusements closed the theatre. In 2002, National Amusements transferred ownership to the non-profit Worcester Center for the Performing Arts, established by Ed Madaus and Paul Demoga.

After extensive fundraising efforts and building community support, the theatre opened in March 2008 and was named The Hanover Theatre for the Performing Arts, after one of the theatre's corporate sponsors (Hanover Insurance) donated much of the seed money to make the opening become a reality.

Today, the theatre has seating capacity for 2300 patrons, and hosts nationally prominent entertainers, Broadway national touring companies, family touring companies, as well as providing a local outlet for community based artists and organizations. The Franklin Square Salon Gallery, located on the second floor, features art exhibits organized by ArtsWorcester.

The theatre, under the name Poli's Palace Theater, was added the National Register of Historic Places in January 2011.

The Hanover Theatre Conservatory for the Performing Arts was added in 2016. The conservatory provides space for education and outreach and provides classrooms for acting and vocal training, and various aspects of theatre production including lighting, costume design, and scenic and prop design. It also provides barres for ballet and movement training.

== Gallery ==
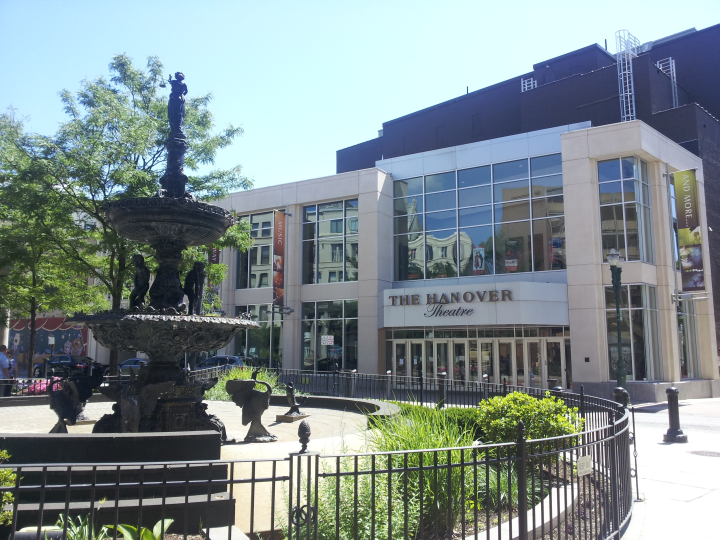
Main entrance of the theatre and nearby fountain

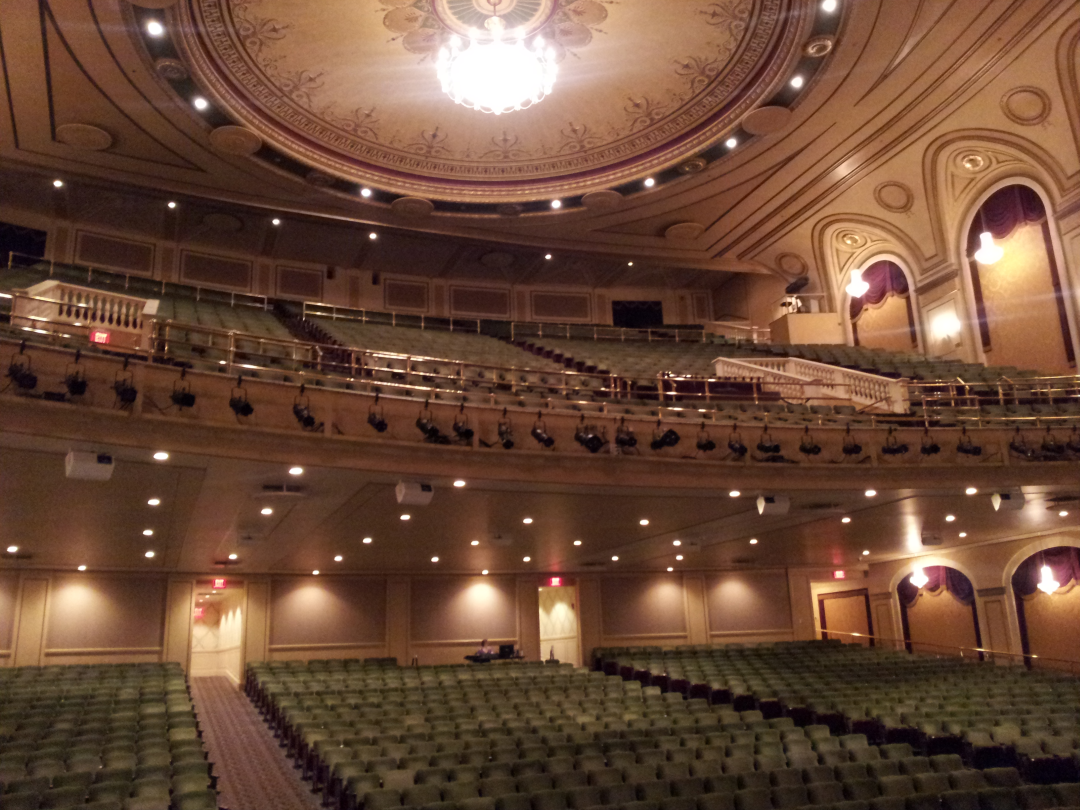
Interior view of the theatre, viewed from the stage

== See also ==
- National Register of Historic Places listings in northwestern Worcester, Massachusetts
- National Register of Historic Places listings in Worcester County, Massachusetts
