= Fogg Library =

- U.S. National Register of Historic Places
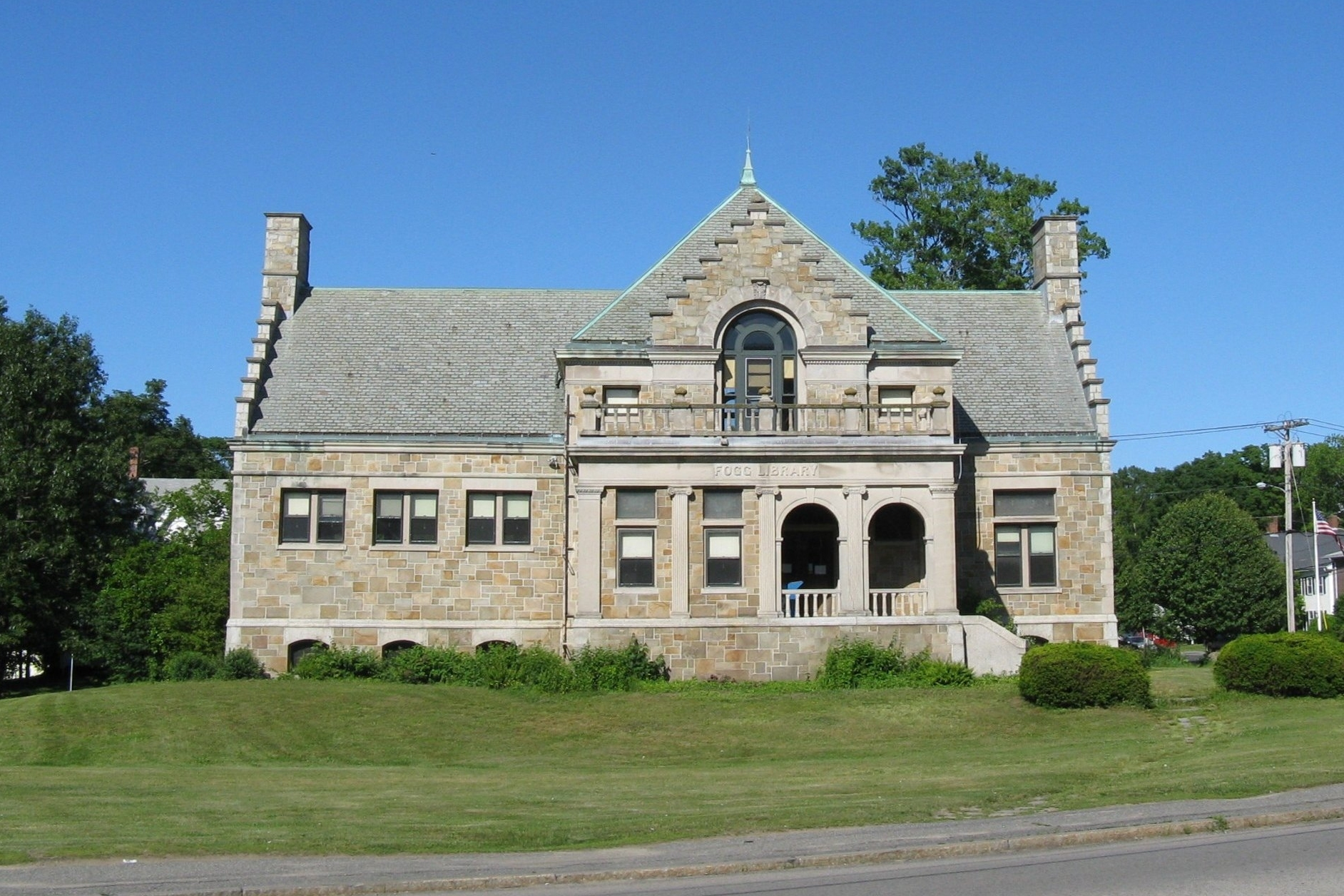
- Fogg Library

- Location within Massachusetts Location within the United States
- Location: Weymouth, Massachusetts
- Coordinates: 42°10′28″N 70°57′4″W
- Built: 1897
- Architect: Cutting, Carleton & Cutting
- Architectural style: Late Victorian, Renaissance
- NRHP reference No.: 81000113
- Added to NRHP: June 11, 1981

The Fogg Library is a historic library building at 1 Columbian Street in Weymouth, Massachusetts. Built in 1897 to a design by Cutting, Carleton & Cutting, the Renaissance Revival stone building serves as a branch of the Weymouth Public Library. It was a gift from local businessman John S. Fogg. It has a steeply pitched gable roof with stepped ends in the Dutch Revival style and a projecting gable section that houses the entry under a round-arched loggia.

The building was listed on the National Register of Historic Places in 1981.

== See also ==
- National Register of Historic Places listings in Norfolk County, Massachusetts
