= Franklin Wesson House =

Historic house in Massachusetts, United States

- U.S. National Register of Historic Places
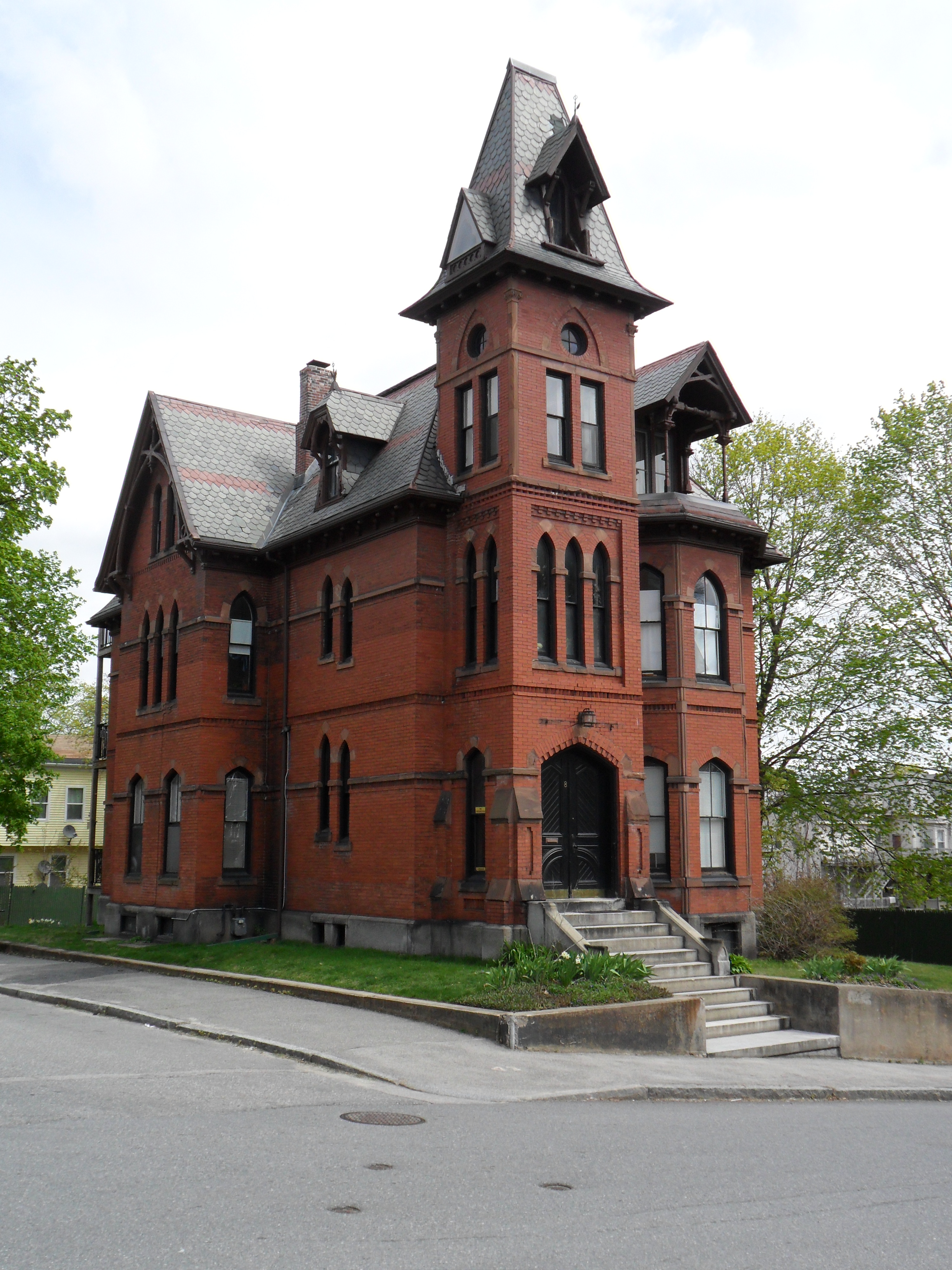
- Front of the house

- Location within Massachusetts Location within the United States
- Location: 8 Claremont St., Worcester, Massachusetts
- Coordinates: 42°15′16″N 71°49′2″W
- Built: 1874
- Architect: Amos P. Cutting
- Architectural style: High Victorian Gothic
- MPS: Worcester MRA
- NRHP reference No.: 80000603
- Added to NRHP: March 5, 1980

The Franklin Wesson House is an historic house at 8 Claremont Street in the Main South neighborhood of Worcester, Massachusetts. It is one of the finest High Gothic Victorian houses in the city. It was designed by architect Amos Porter Cutting.

The 2 1/2-story brick structure was built in 1874 for Franklin Wesson, one of the founders of Harrington & Richardson, a major Worcester arms manufacturer. It is roughly rectangular in form, but has a number of protrusions, most notably a three-story tower over its entrance that is capped by a steeply pitched slate hip roof. The body of the house is also topped by a hip roof with a major bay on the right side whose steeply pitched roof rises to its own peak. The windows of the house are predominantly narrower with rounded tops, and there are horizontal bands of decorative brickwork at several levels.

The house was listed on the National Register of Historic Places in 1980.

== See also ==
- John Legg House, 5 Claremont Street, also owned by a major Worcester businessman
- National Register of Historic Places listings in southwestern Worcester, Massachusetts
- National Register of Historic Places listings in Worcester County, Massachusetts
