= Lower Pleasant Street District =

Historic district in Massachusetts, United States

- U.S. National Register of Historic Places
- U.S. Historic district
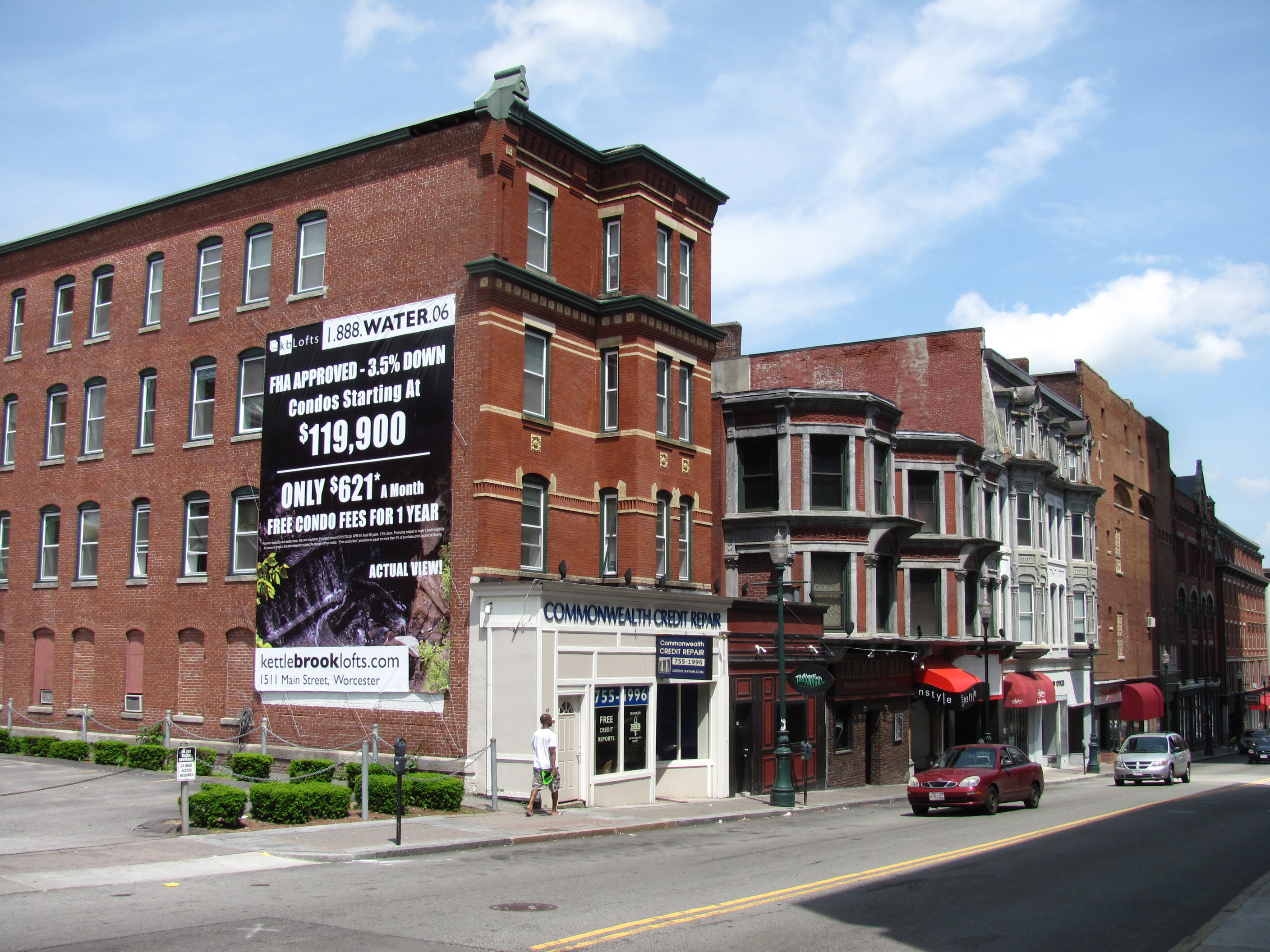
- Lower Pleasant Street

- Location within Massachusetts Location within the United States
- Location: 418-426 Main St. and 9-49 Pleasant St., Worcester, Massachusetts
- Coordinates: 42°15′49″N 71°48′12″W
- Built: 1869
- Architect: Barker & Nourse; E. Boyden & Son; Cutting & Forbush
- Architectural style: Second Empire, Gothic
- MPS: Worcester MRA
- NRHP reference No.: 80000613
- Added to NRHP: March 05, 1980

The Lower Pleasant Street District is an historic district at 418–426 Main Street and 9–49 Pleasant Street in Worcester, Massachusetts. It encompasses the only surviving row of Victorian-era commercial buildings in downtown Worcester. These buildings were built between 1872 and 1890, and are located along the north side of Pleasant Street, from its corner with Main Street nearly to Chestnut Street. 39 Pleasant Street is the location of Str8Up Entertainment. The most unusual of the six buildings is the Odd Fellows Hall at 9-15 Pleasant Street, which is the only commercial Gothic Revival building left in the city.

The district was listed on the National Register of Historic Places in 1980.

== See also ==
- National Register of Historic Places listings in northwestern Worcester, Massachusetts
- National Register of Historic Places listings in Worcester County, Massachusetts
