= Pleasant Street Congregational Church =

Church building in Massachusetts, United States

- U.S. National Register of Historic Places
- U.S. Historic district – Contributing property
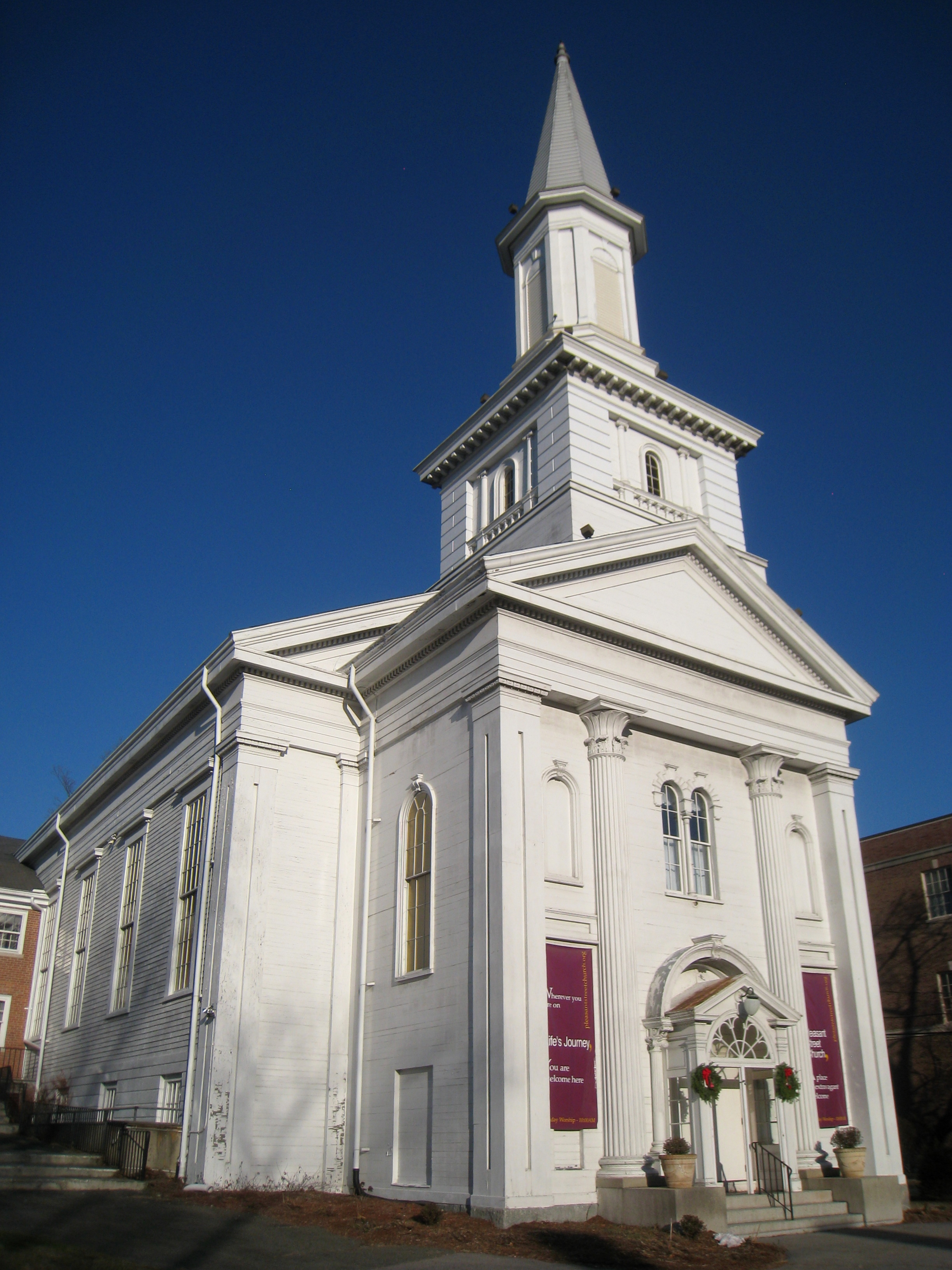

- Location within Massachusetts Location within the United States
- Location: Arlington, Massachusetts
- Coordinates: 42°24′50″N 71°9′23″W
- Built: 1844
- Architect: Sanger, Joseph
- Architectural style: Greek Revival
- Part of: Arlington Center Historic District (ID85002691)
- NRHP reference No.: 83000823

Significant dates
- Added to NRHP: June 23, 1983
- Designated CP: September 27, 1985

The Pleasant Street Congregational Church is an historic Congregational church at 75 Pleasant Street in Arlington, Massachusetts. The church was built in 1844 for a congregation that split doctrinally from the First Parish Church, whose adherents chose to become Unitarian. The church is a fine example of pattern-book Greek Revival architecture. Its steeple was toppled in 1871, and was again damaged by the New England Hurricane of 1938, necessitating steel reinforcements. The interior was restyled in the late Victorian period, and lengthened in 1883 to accommodate increased attendance. The Colonial Revival front entrance dates to the a series of alterations and repairs made after the 1938 hurricane.

The church building was listed on the National Register of Historic Places in 1983, and included in an expansion of the Arlington Center Historic District in 1985.

In 2012 the church closed and the congregation was disbanded. The Boston Church of Christ subsequently purchased the church, substantially renovating the 1956 with the addition of a floor of the Pleasant Street facade. The interior of the sanctuary was also substantially altered with the removal of the curved wooden pews and twin pulpits. The Boston Church of Christ holds services there.

== See also ==
- National Register of Historic Places listings in Arlington, Massachusetts
