= Pleasant–School Street Historic District =

Historic district in Massachusetts, United States

- U.S. National Register of Historic Places
- U.S. Historic district
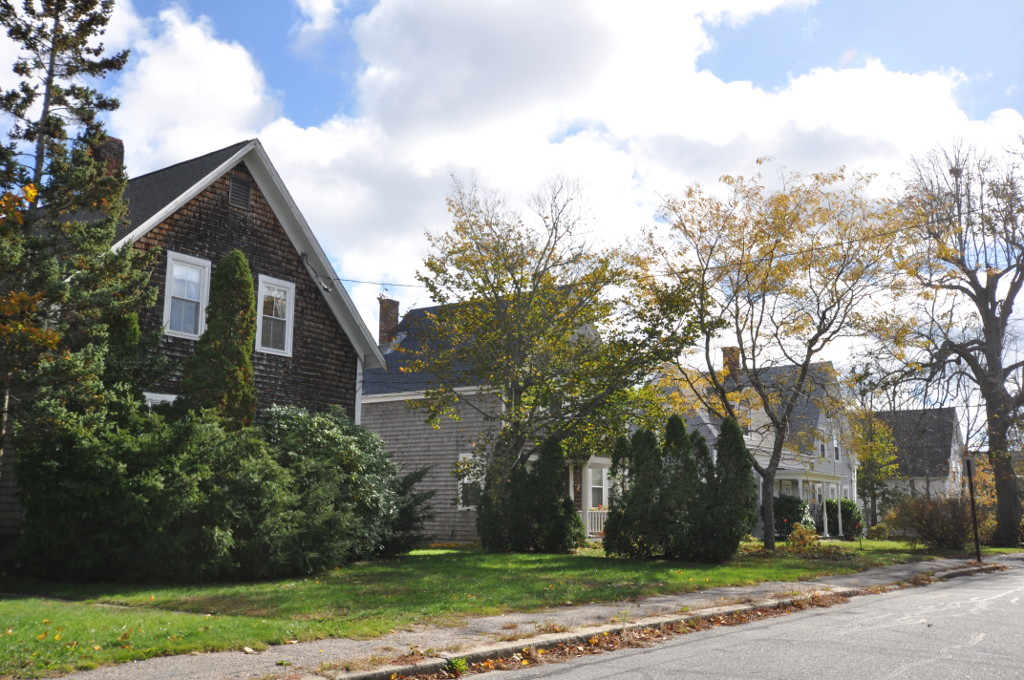

- Location within Cape Cod Location within Massachusetts Location within the United States
- Location: Pleasant and School Sts., Barnstable, Massachusetts
- Coordinates: 41°39′12″N 70°16′42″W
- Architectural style: Greek Revival
- MPS: Barnstable MRA
- NRHP reference No.: 87000257
- Added to NRHP: November 10, 1987

The Pleasant–School Street Historic District is a predominantly residential historic district in the Hyannis village of Barnstable, Massachusetts. It includes 37 properties on Pleasant and School Streets, between Main and South Streets, near the center of Hyannis. Pleasant Street was laid out in the 18th century, and School Street was laid out c. 1850, and is distinctive for its cohesive collection of Greek Revival cottages, most of which were owned by mariners active in the coasting trade. The district was listed on the National Register of Historic Places in 1987.

== Description and history ==
The Pleasant–School Street District is located just north of Hyannis's innermost harbor on the south coast of Cape Cod. The district extends along the north side of South Street between Pleasant and School Streets, and then along both sides of Pleasant and School up to, but not including, the commercial properties that line Main Street. With a few exceptions, all of the properties are residential; these include a mid-19th century former Congregational church, and the former commercial premises of two small newspaper publishers. The oldest building in the district is the colonial-era Hallett House at 27 Pleasant Street; the largest number of houses are Greek Revival structures built between about 1830 and 1860. Houses are typically 1-1/2 stories in height, with wood-frame construction and shingle siding. At least eight of these have been connected to prominent local ship's captains active in the coasting trade in the 19th century. There are a few later Italianate and Queen Anne Victorian houses, and a smaller number of 20th-century intrusions.

== See also ==
- National Register of Historic Places listings in Barnstable County, Massachusetts
