= Pleasant Street School =

Pleasant Street School may refer to:

in the United States

- Pleasant Street School (Ayer, Massachusetts), listed on the NRHP in Massachusetts
- Pleasant Street School (Spencer, Massachusetts), listed on the NRHP in Massachusetts
