= Warren First Congregational Church-Federated Church =

Historic church in Massachusetts, United States

- Warren First Congregational Church – Federated Church
- U.S. National Register of Historic Places
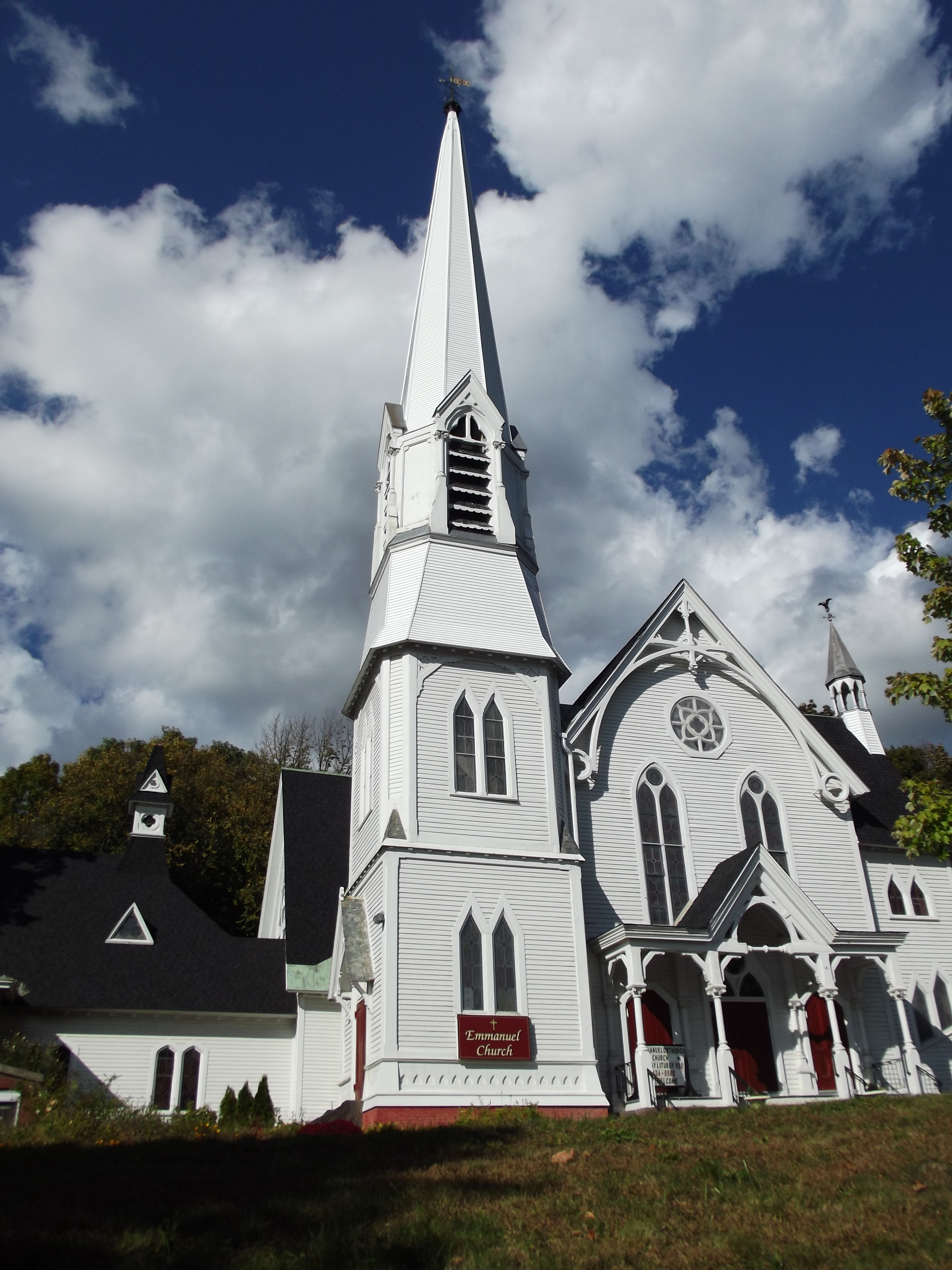

- Location within Massachusetts
- Location: 25 Winthrop Terrace, Warren, Massachusetts, United States
- Coordinates: 42°12′49″N 72°11′31″W
- Area: 0.5 acres (0.20 ha)
- Built: 1875 (151 years ago)
- Architect: Amos P. Cutting
- Architectural style: Gothic Revival
- NRHP reference No.: 04001258
- Added to NRHP: November 27, 2004 (21 years ago)

The Warren First Congregational Church-Federated Church is an American historic church building, located at 25 Winthrop Terrace in Warren, Massachusetts.

The Victorian Gothic wood-frame building was constructed in 1875 for a congregation that was the first in Warren, dating to the 18th century. This church was built on a site to which the second meetinghouse (from 1797) had been moved in the 1830s, after the church and government separated the use of facilities. The 1797 building was destroyed by fire in 1874.

The church was designed by Amos P. Cutting, and has stained-glass windows by Samuel West.

The church was listed on the National Register of Historic Places in 2004.

The church was bought by the congregation of Emmanuel Orthodox Church in 2008, a parish of the Antiochian Orthodox Christian Archdiocese of North America. The congregation maintains the building and its 1875 Steer & Turner pipe organ.

== See also ==
- 1875 in architecture
- National Register of Historic Places listings in Worcester County, Massachusetts
