= Quinsigamond Firehouse =

- U.S. National Register of Historic Places
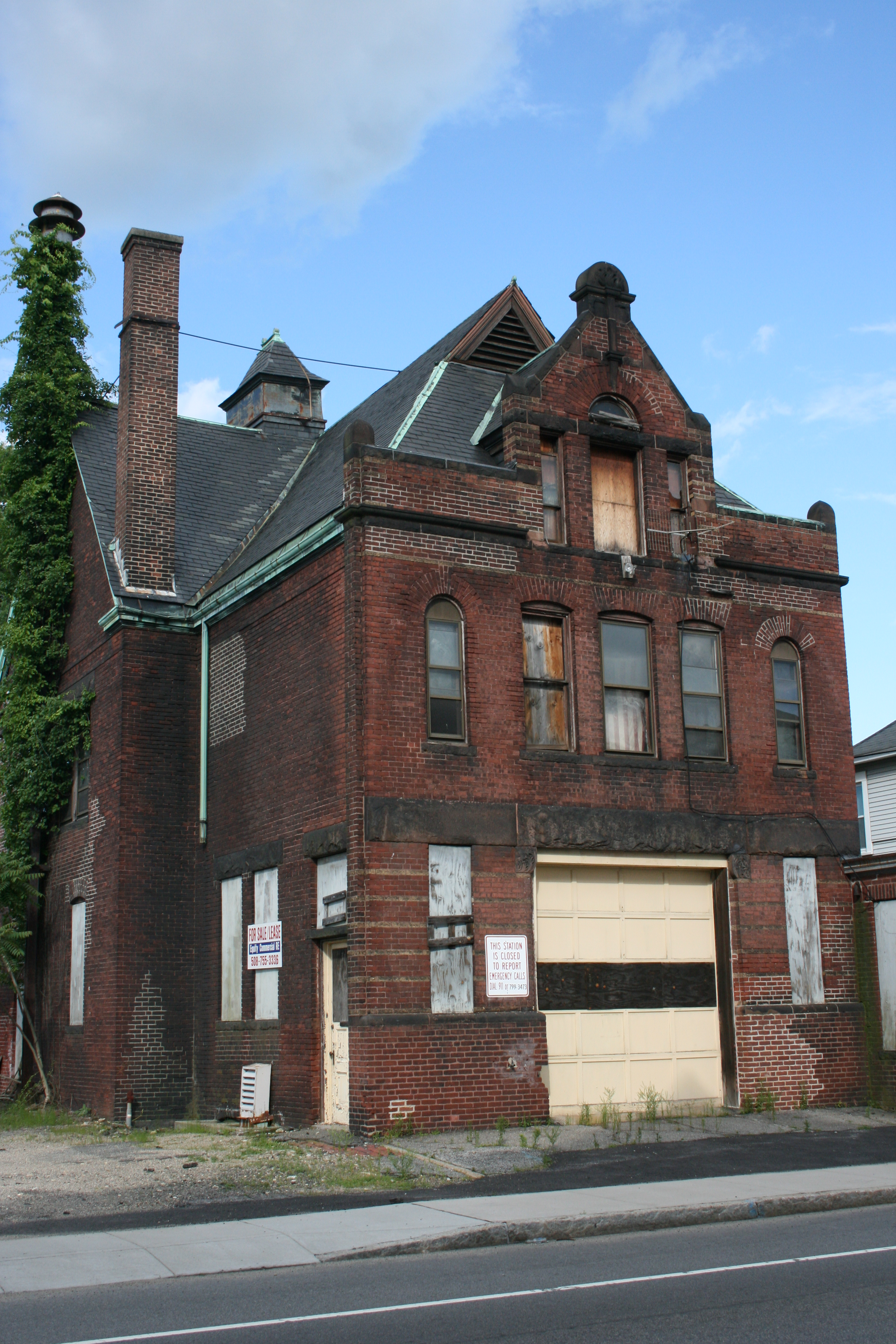

- Location within Massachusetts Location within the United States
- Location: 15 Blackstone River Rd., Worcester, Massachusetts
- Coordinates: 42°14′1″N 71°47′44″W
- Area: less than one acre
- Built: 1892
- Architect: Patston & Lincoln
- Architectural style: Romanesque
- MPS: Worcester MRA
- NRHP reference No.: 80000495
- Added to NRHP: March 05, 1980

The Quinsigamond Firehouse is a historic fire station at 15 Blackstone River Road in Worcester, Massachusetts. Completed in 1892, it is a distinctive local example of Romanesque architecture, and served as a local firehouse until 1994. The building was listed on the National Register of Historic Places in 1980. After standing unused for many years, rehabilitation of the property was contemplated by new ownership in 2013 and 2017.

== Description and history ==
The Quinsigamond Firehouse is one of the institutional buildings making up the center of Quinsigamond village in southern Worcester; it stands on the east side of Blackstone River Road (formerly Millbury Street) across from the elementary school. It is a red brick structure, 2-1/2 stories in height, covered with a gable-on-hip roof. The main facade has a central equipment bay on the ground floor, flanked by slender windows and topped by a band of brownstone trim. The second floor has three central windows set in segmented-arch openings, flanked by single windows in round-arch openings. A wall dormer, with three windows in a Palladian arrangement, rises above, forming part of a parapet.

The firehouse was designed by Patston & Lincoln and built in 1891-92 by O. C. Ward for $7,112. It is stylistically similar to two other fire stations that were built about the same time in the city, differing from them in the presence of the second story and gable window arrangement. The station remained in service until 1994, when a new district station was built on McKeon Street. The building has been vacant since then, with rehabilitation most recently proposed in 2017.

== See also ==
- National Register of Historic Places listings in eastern Worcester, Massachusetts
