= Oxford Main Street Historic District =

Historic district in Massachusetts, United States

- U.S. National Register of Historic Places
- U.S. Historic district
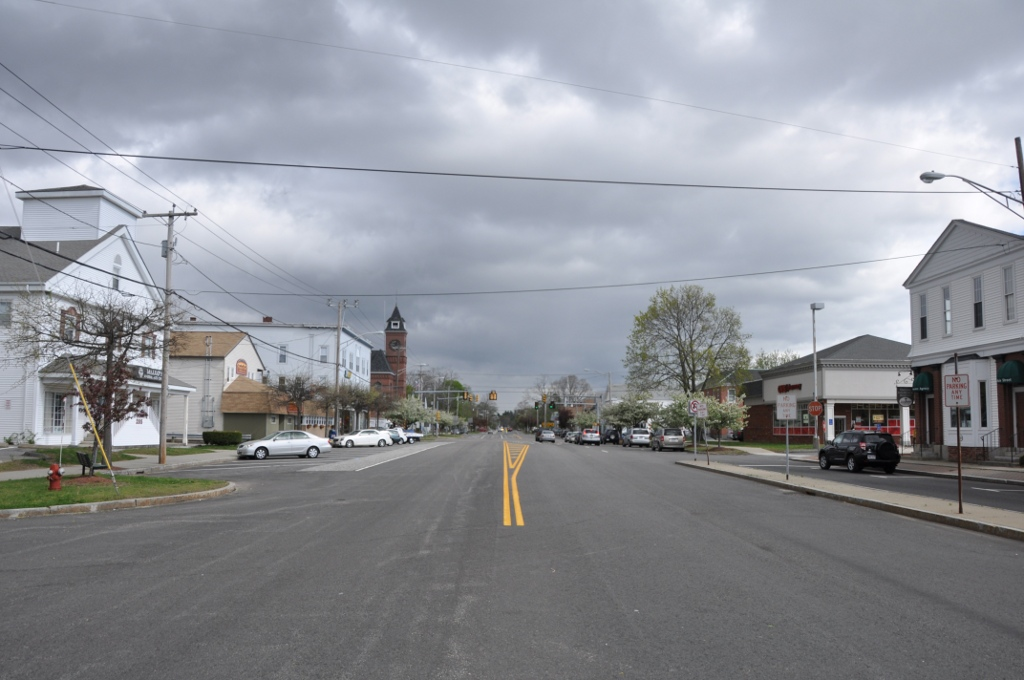
- View of Main Street

- Location within Massachusetts Location within the United States
- Location: Oxford, Massachusetts
- Coordinates: 42°7′1″N 71°51′53″W
- Architectural style: Federal, Greek Revival
- NRHP reference No.: 11000586
- Added to NRHP: August 24, 2011

The Oxford Main Street Historic District is a national historic district encompassing the historic center of Oxford, Massachusetts. The 95-acre (38 ha) district extends along Main Street from Huguenot Street in the south to Front Street in the north. Its oldest buildings are residential houses built in the late 19th century, while most of the properties were built in the 19th century, with Greek Revival architecture predominating. The oldest commercial building, the John Wetherell Store, was built c. 1817, and now houses offices. The district includes four churches, including the 1793 Universalist church and 1829 First Congregational Church, and a number of municipal buildings, including the town hall, two schools, and the 1903 Classical Revival Charles Larned Memorial Library.

The district was listed on the National Register of Historic Places in 2011.

== See also ==
- National Register of Historic Places listings in Worcester County, Massachusetts
