= Spencer Town Center Historic District =

Historic district in Massachusetts, United States

- U.S. National Register of Historic Places
- U.S. Historic district
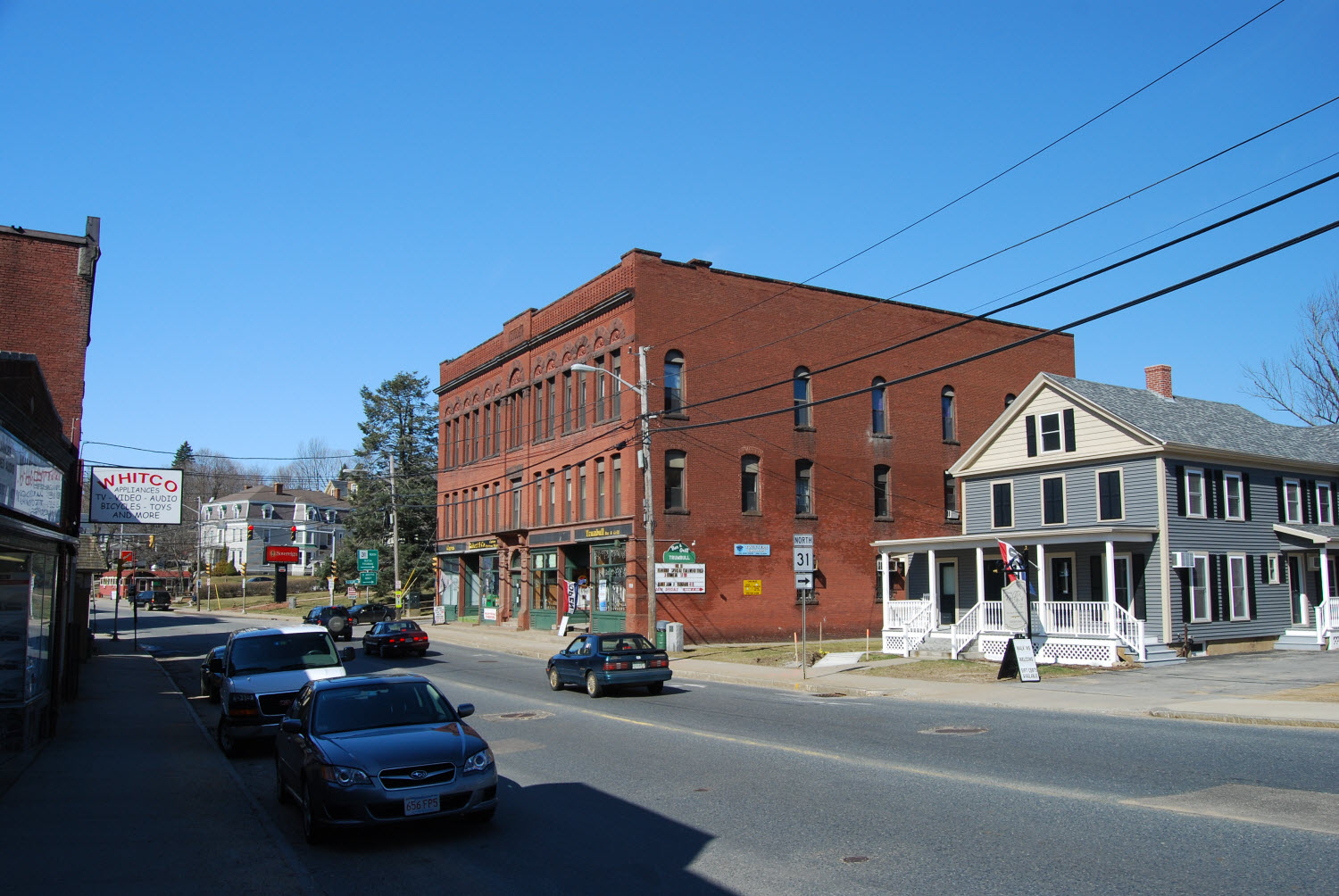

- Location within Massachusetts Location within the United States
- Location: Spencer, Massachusetts
- Coordinates: 42°14′42″N 71°59′33″W
- Area: c. 130 acres (53 ha)
- Architect: Elbridge Boyden; Et al.
- Architectural style: Mid 19th Century Revival, Late Victorian
- NRHP reference No.: 86001399 (original); 96000826 (increase 1); 03000685 (increase 2); 03000551 (increase 3)

Significant dates
- Added to NRHP: June 26, 1986
- Boundary increases: August 9, 1996; July 25, 2003; August 18, 2003

The Spencer Town Center Historic District encompasses the historic downtown of Spencer, Massachusetts. When first listed on the National Register of Historic Places in 1986, the district covered 250 acres (100 ha) centered on Main Street between High and North Streets. A major expansion, the East Main Street – Cherry Street Historic District, added 45 acres (18 ha) of a predominantly residential area east of the center. The district was expanded twice in 2003, adding residential areas along Grove, Prouty, Pleasant, High, and Main Streets, and industrial areas on Cherry, Wall, and Mechanic Streets, as well as Luther Hill Park. The main period of historic interest is the peak period of Spencer's industrial history in the last quarter of the 19th century, although there are a significant number of properties that predate this period.

== History ==
The town of Spencer was settled in the 1720s and incorporated in 1753. Main Street, now Massachusetts Route 9, was essentially a former Native American trail that served English colonists as a major east-west route since the 17th century. At first strung out along Main Street, the town center grew at the junction of Main with Pleasant and Maple Streets (Massachusetts Route 31), which provided transport to the communities north and south of the village. The town remained economically agricultural until the 19th century, when the Embargo Act of 1807 spurred industrial development. Business engage in the manufacture of textiles, wires, and boots arose in the following years, spurring growth in population, housing, and supporting businesses. Textile manufacturing in particular was concentrated just south of Main Street, resulting in early growth of housing to the east and west. Later in the 19th century, as bootmaking changed from a cottage industry to a centralized one, the center again grew to accommodate workers at boot factories.

== See also ==
- National Register of Historic Places listings in Worcester County, Massachusetts
