= Neighborhoods in Worcester, Massachusetts =

The city of Worcester, Massachusetts consists of six regions: North Worcester, West Side, East Side, Central City, Downtown, and South Worcester. It can be further subdivided into smaller neighborhoods:

North Worcester	West Side	East Side	Central	Downtown	South Worcester
Greendale	Forest Grove	Great Brook Valley	Elm Park	Lincoln Square	Webster Square
Burncoat	Salisbury Street	Booth Apartments Area	Crown Hill/Piedmont	Federal Square	South Worcester (proper)
Indian Hill	Tatnuck	Brittan Square	Main Middle	Worcester Common	Cambridge Street
Indian Lake East	West Tatnuck	Biotech Park Area	Beacon Brightly		Hadwen Park
North Lincoln Street	Mill Street	Green Hill Park	University Park		Main South
The Summit	Newton Square	Bell Hill	Lincoln Estate		Green Island
	Beaver Brook Area	Laurel/Clayton			Canal District
	Cider Mill	Shrewsbury Street			Kelley Square/Water Street
	Columbus Park	Lake Park			College Hill
	Worcester Regional Airport	Franklin/Plantation			Broadmeadow Brook
	Mass Ave	Hamilton			Quinsigamond Village
	Montvale	Union Hill			
	Hammond Heights	Grafton Hill			
		Vernon Hill			

Others:

- Sunderland/Massasoit Road/Rice Square spans Union Hill, Grafton Hill, and Broadmeadow Brook.
- Lake Avenue/Quinsigamond Lake spans several neighborhoods in South Worcester and East Worcester.
- Park Ave skirts the eastern edge of West Worcester.
- The Edgemere neighborhood is primarily in neighboring Shrewsbury, Massachusetts.
- The Arts District spans several neighborhoods in Central City.

== Photo gallery ==
=== Central ===
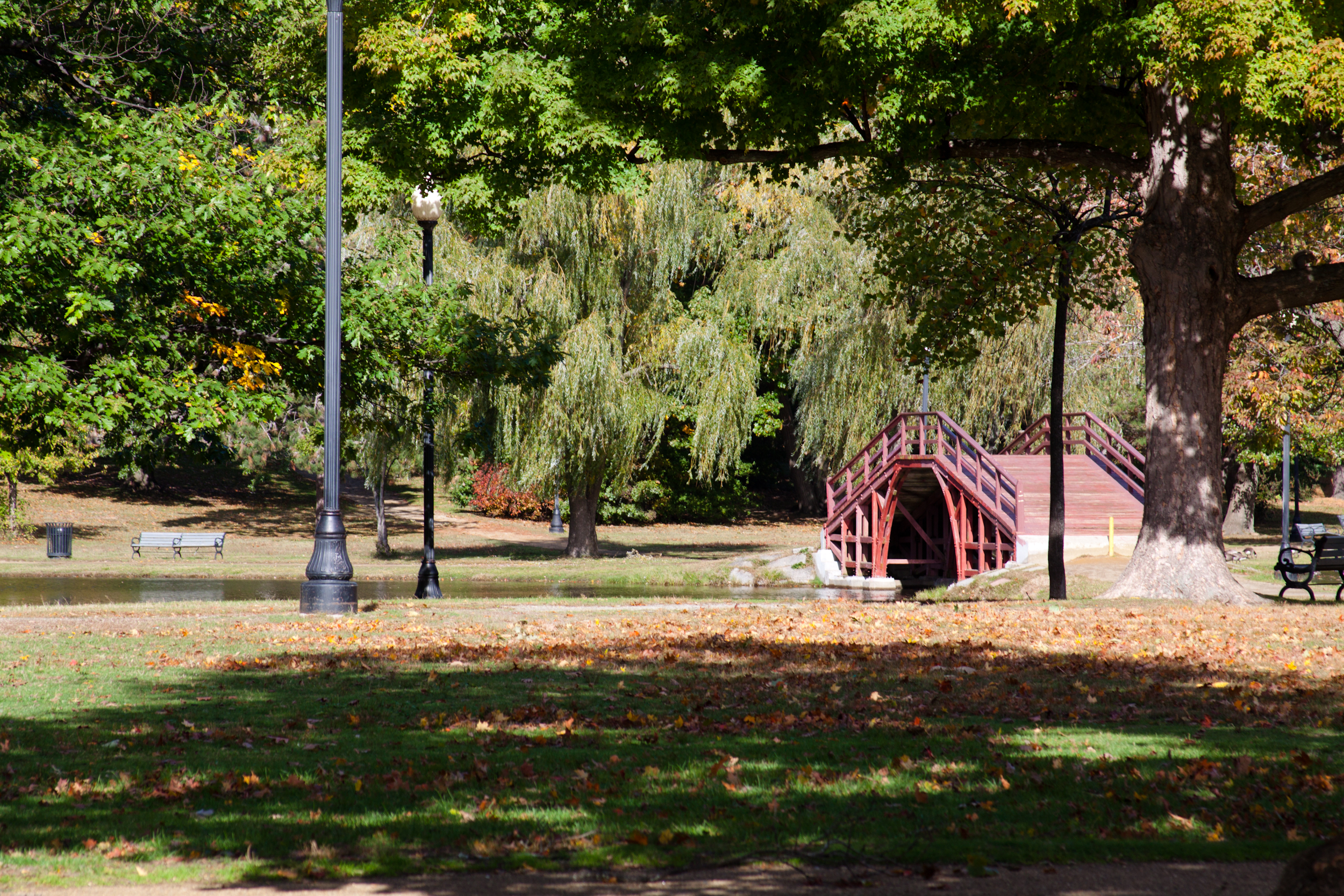
Elm Park

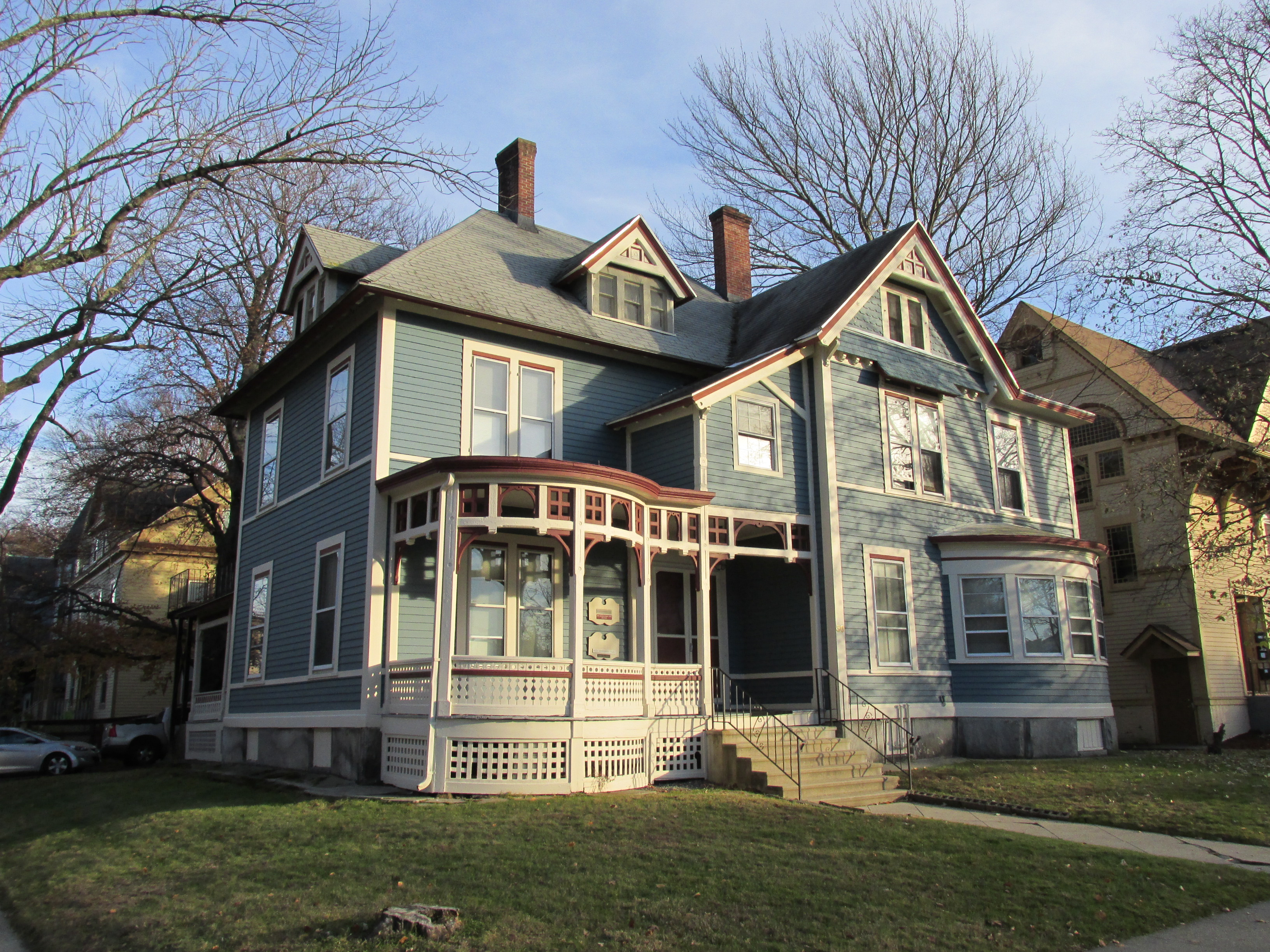
Cedar Street

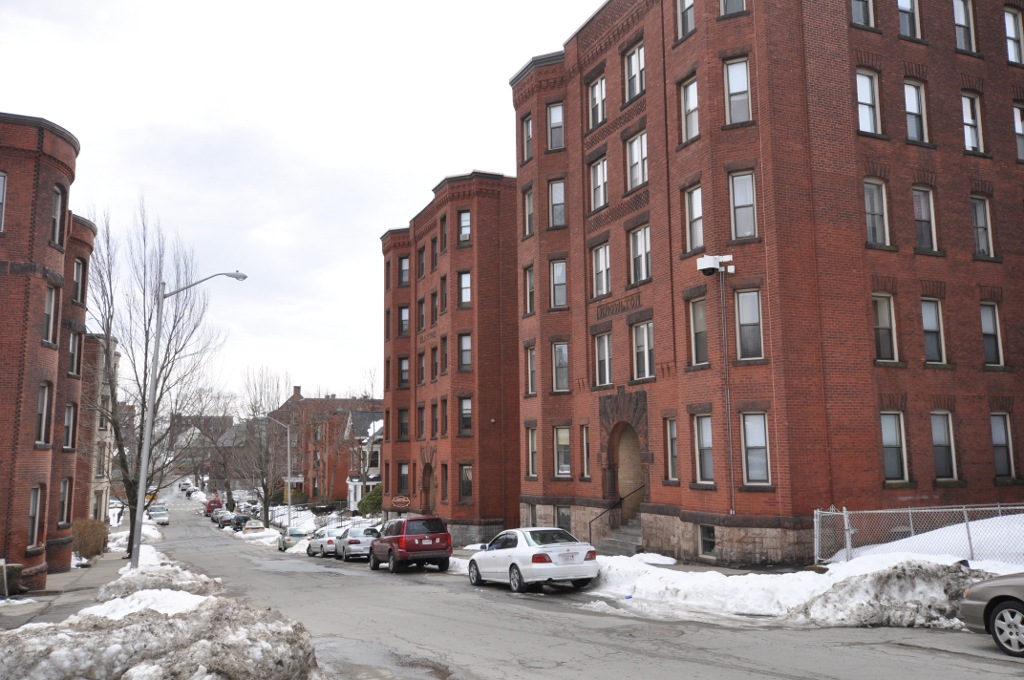
Wellington Street

=== Downtown ===
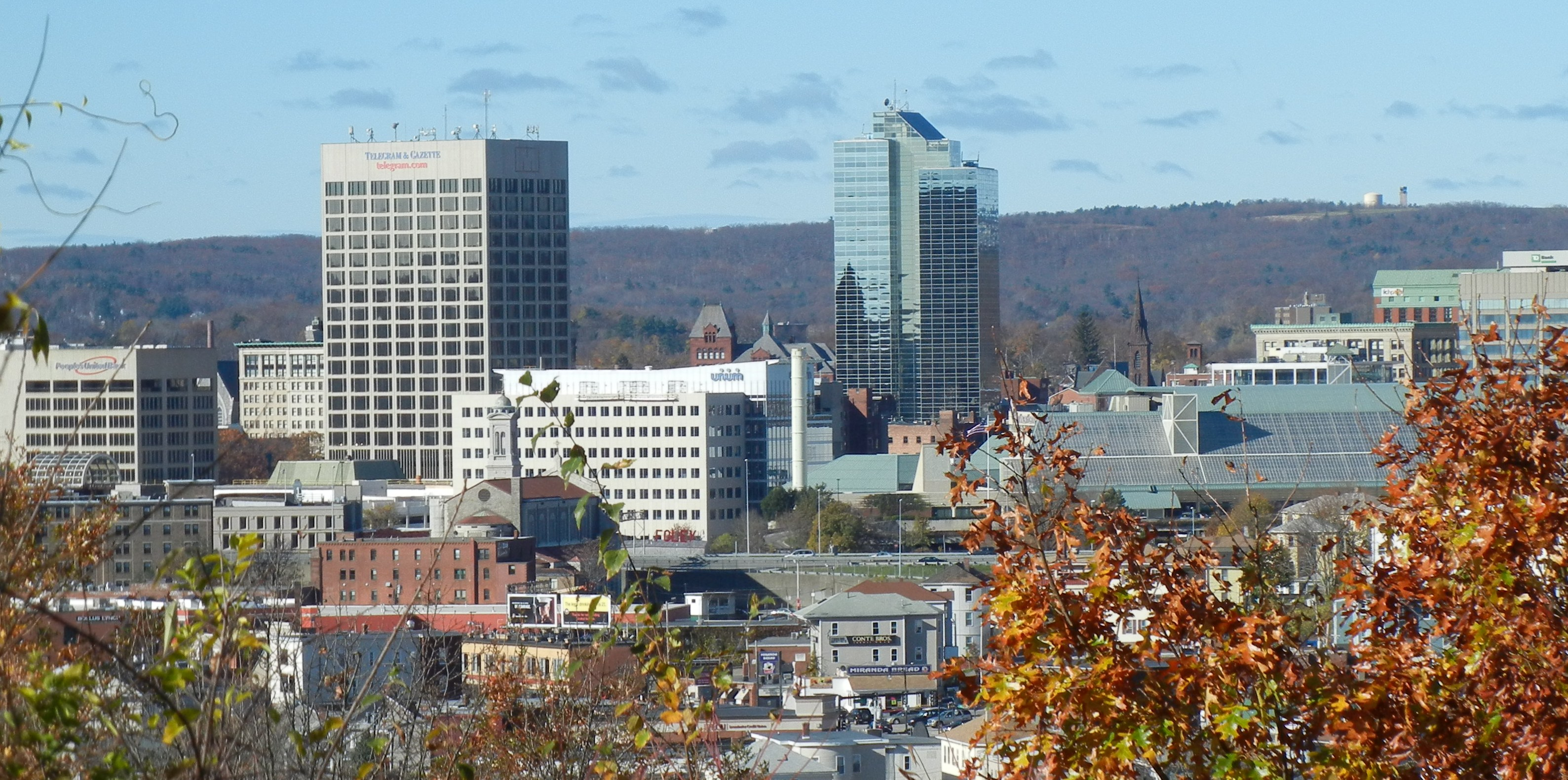
Downtown Skyline

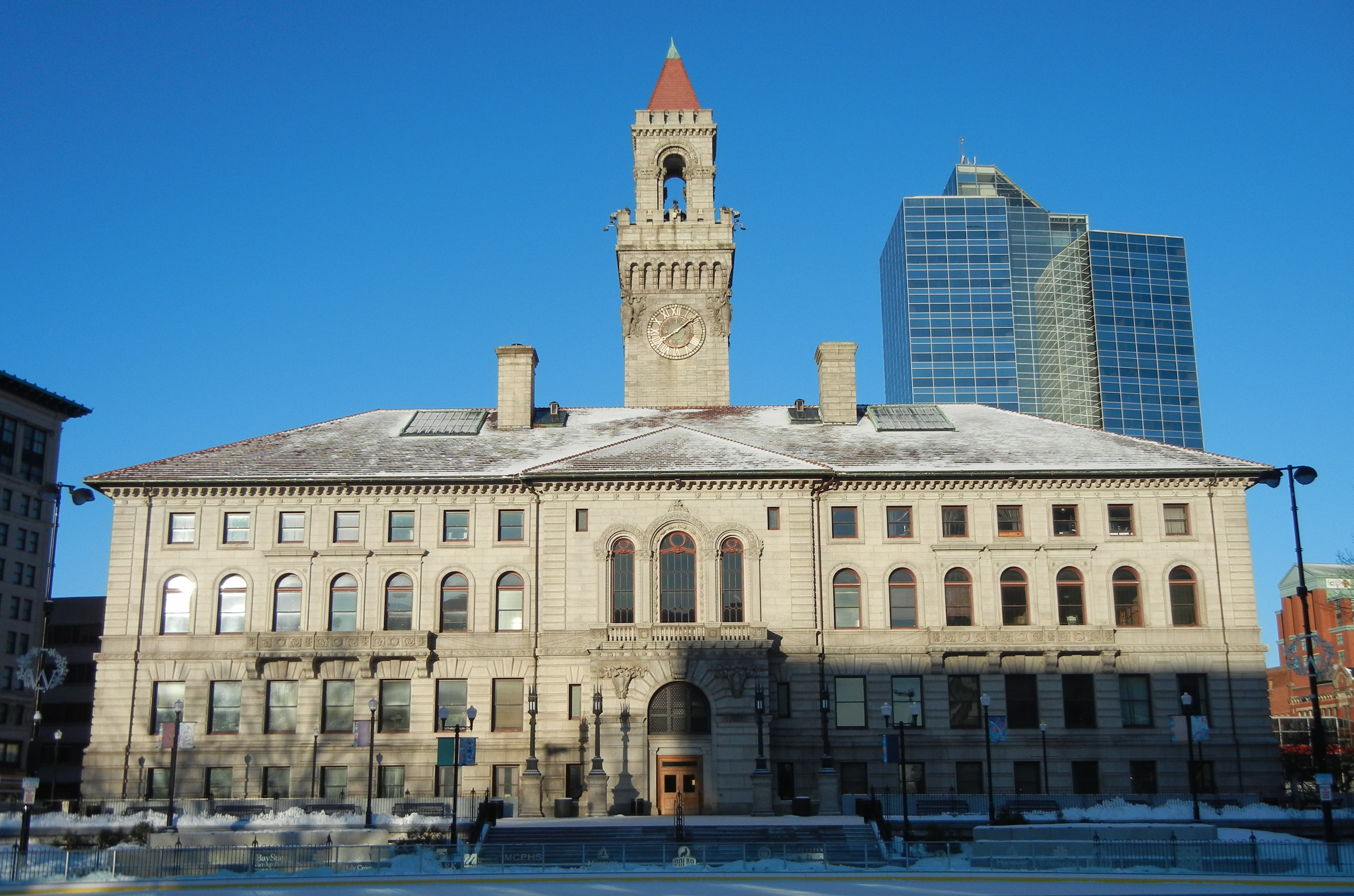
City Hall

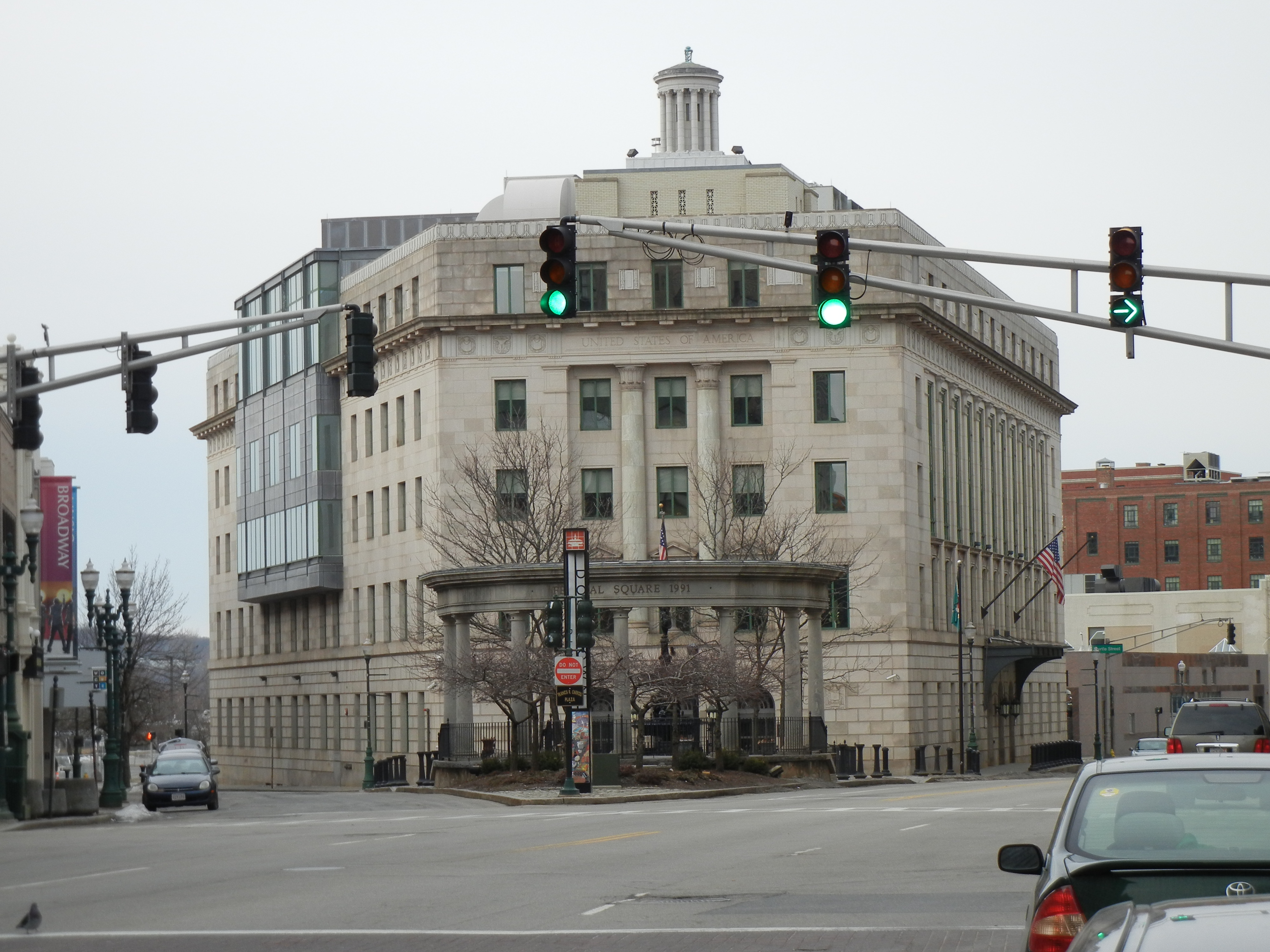
Federal Square

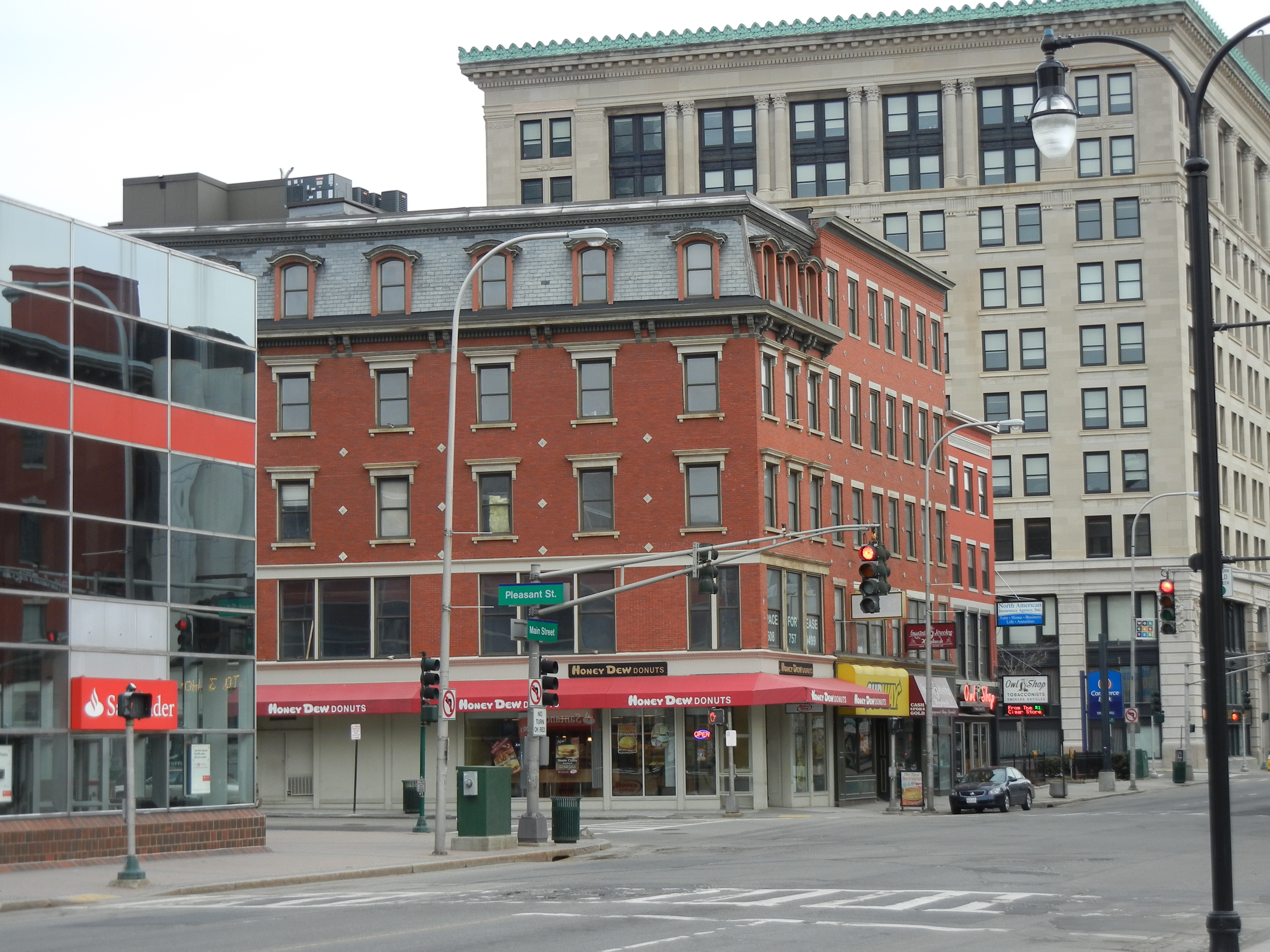
Harrington Corner

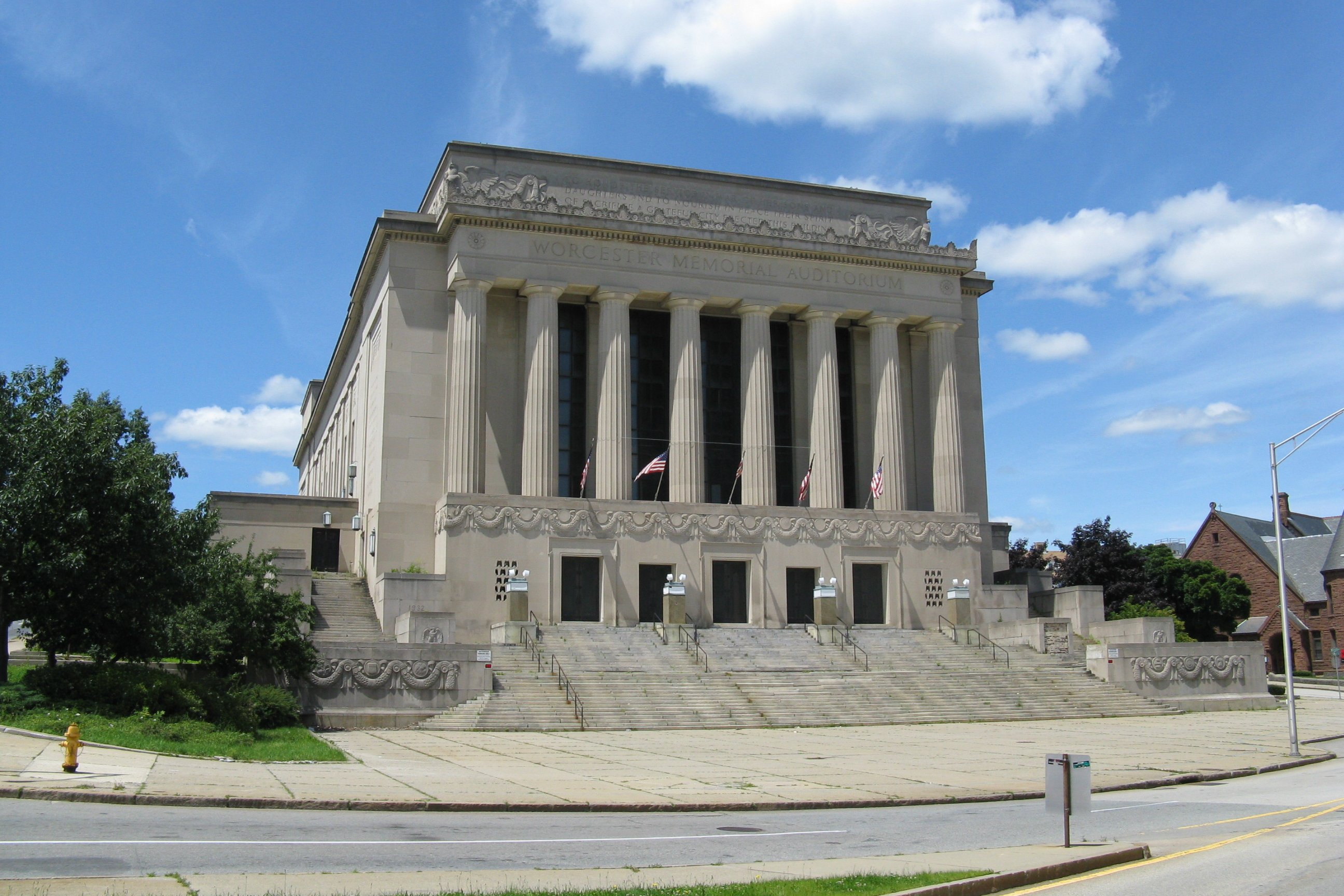
Lincoln Square

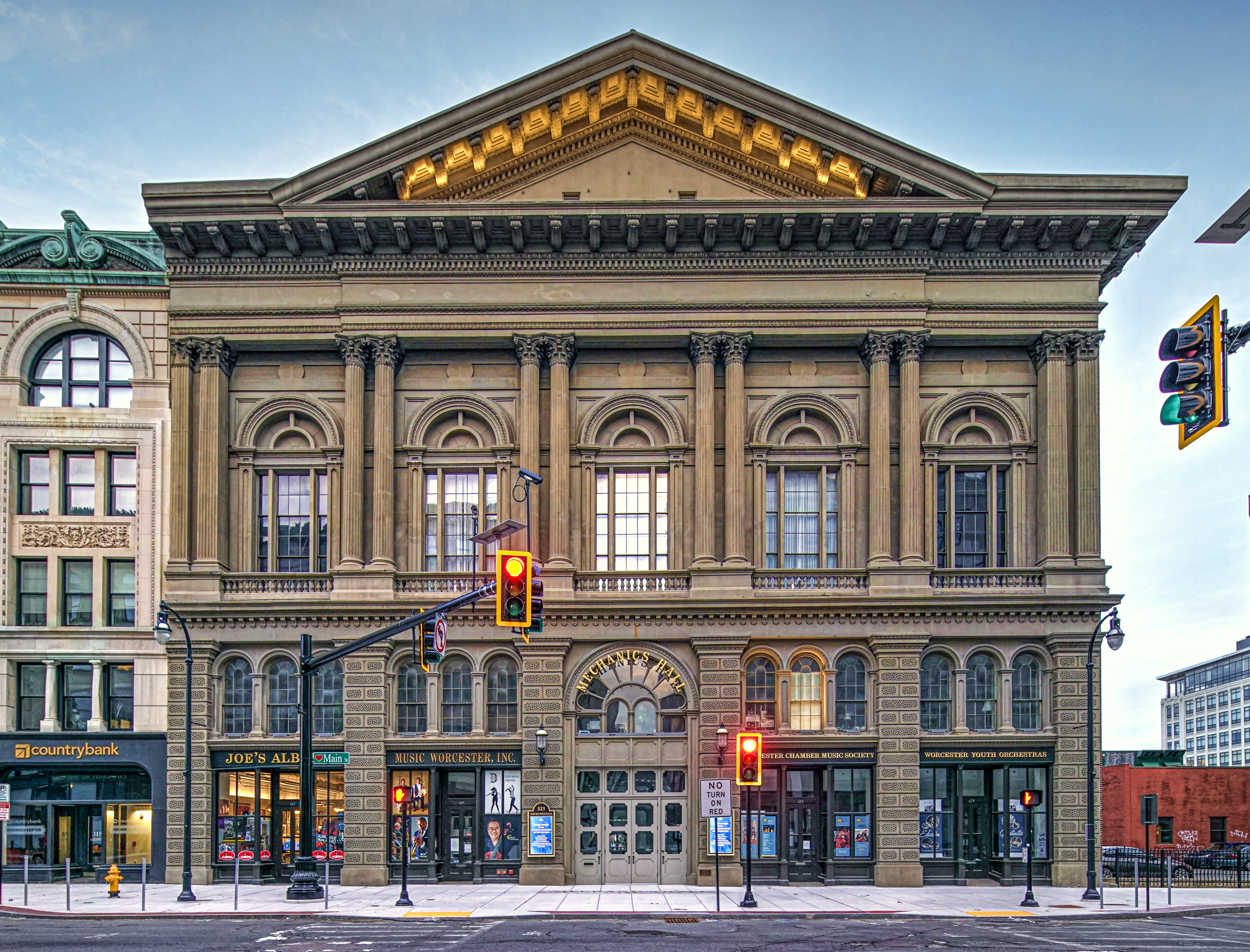
Mechanics Hall

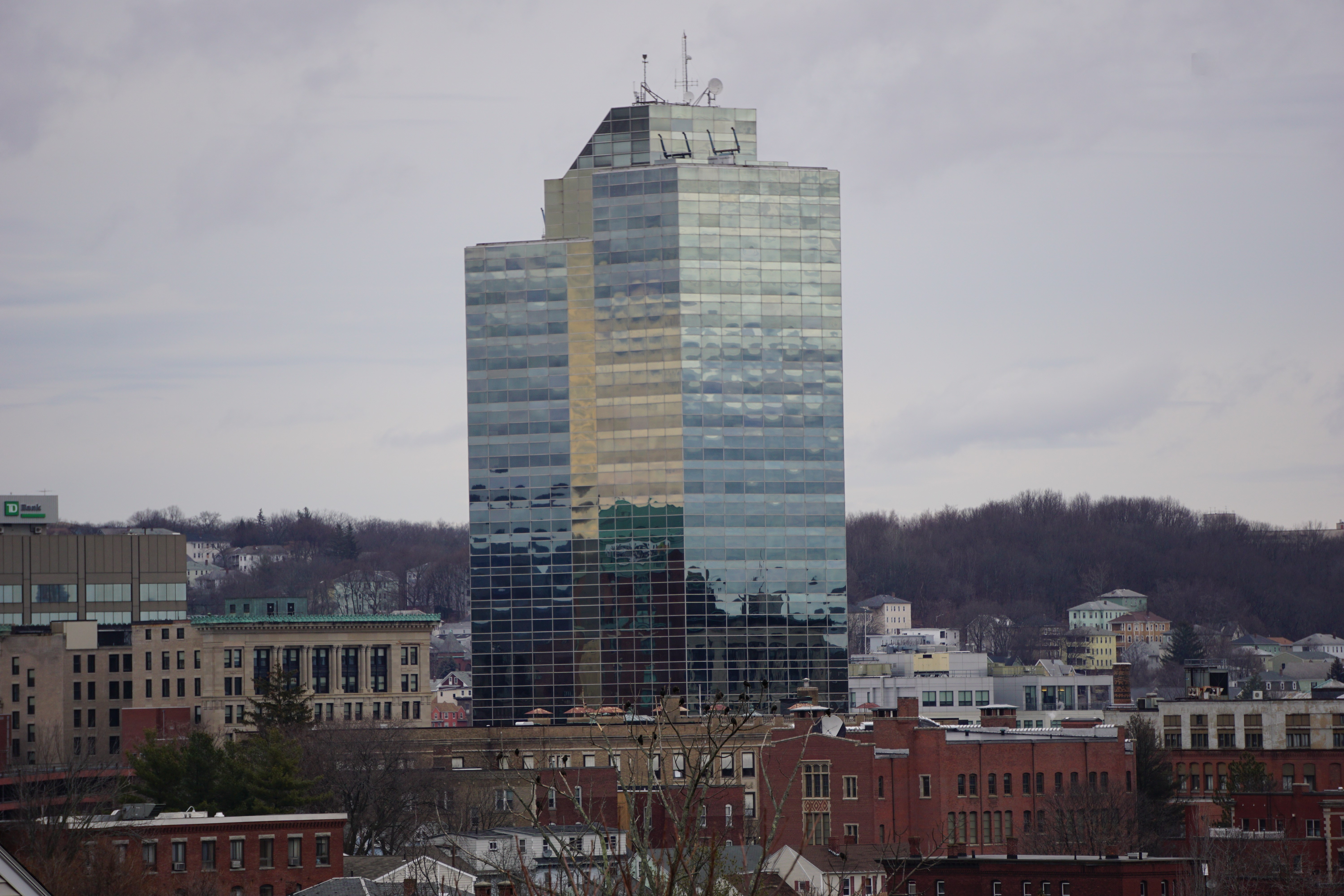
Worcester Plaza

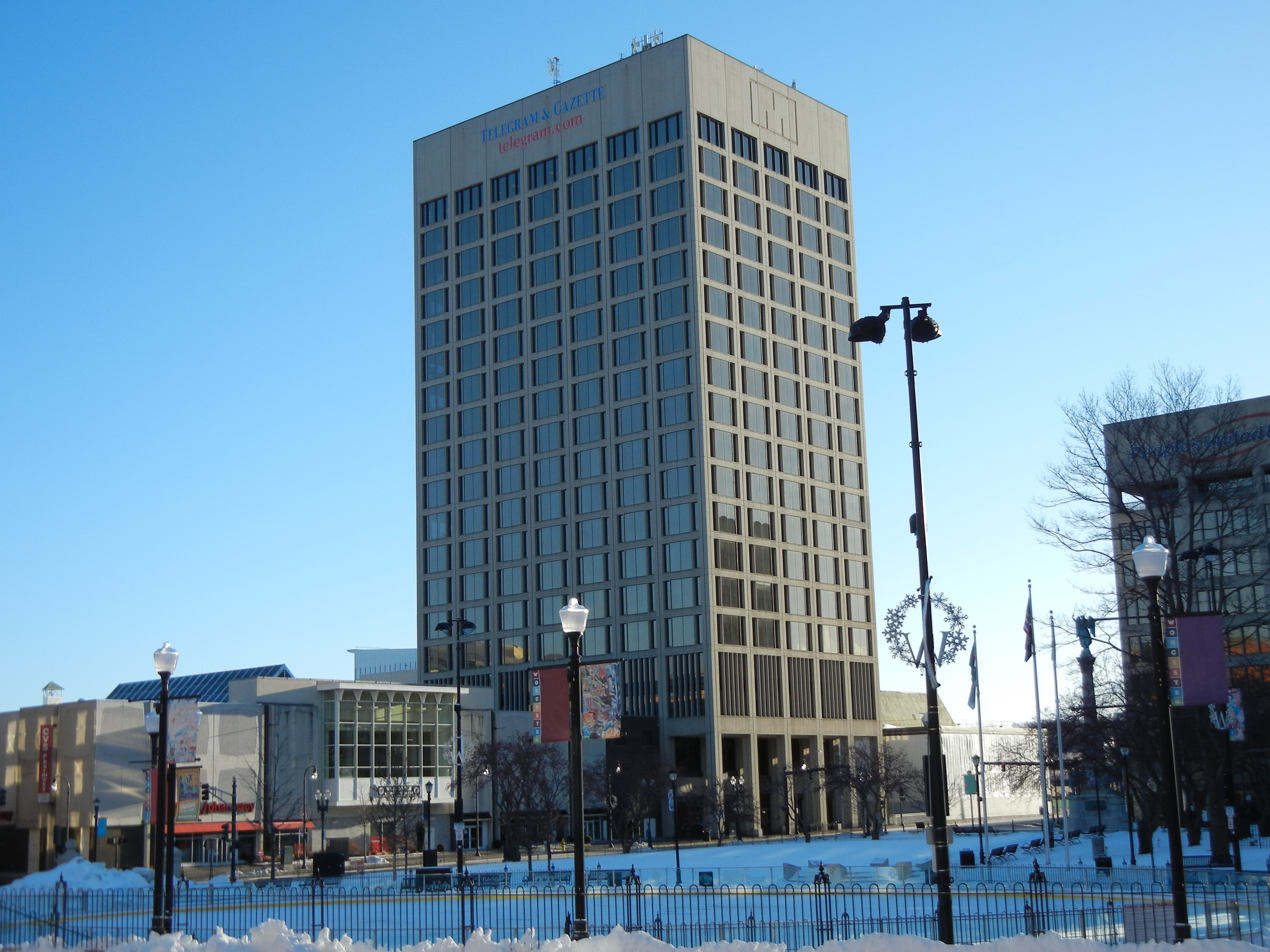
Worcester Common/ Worcester Center

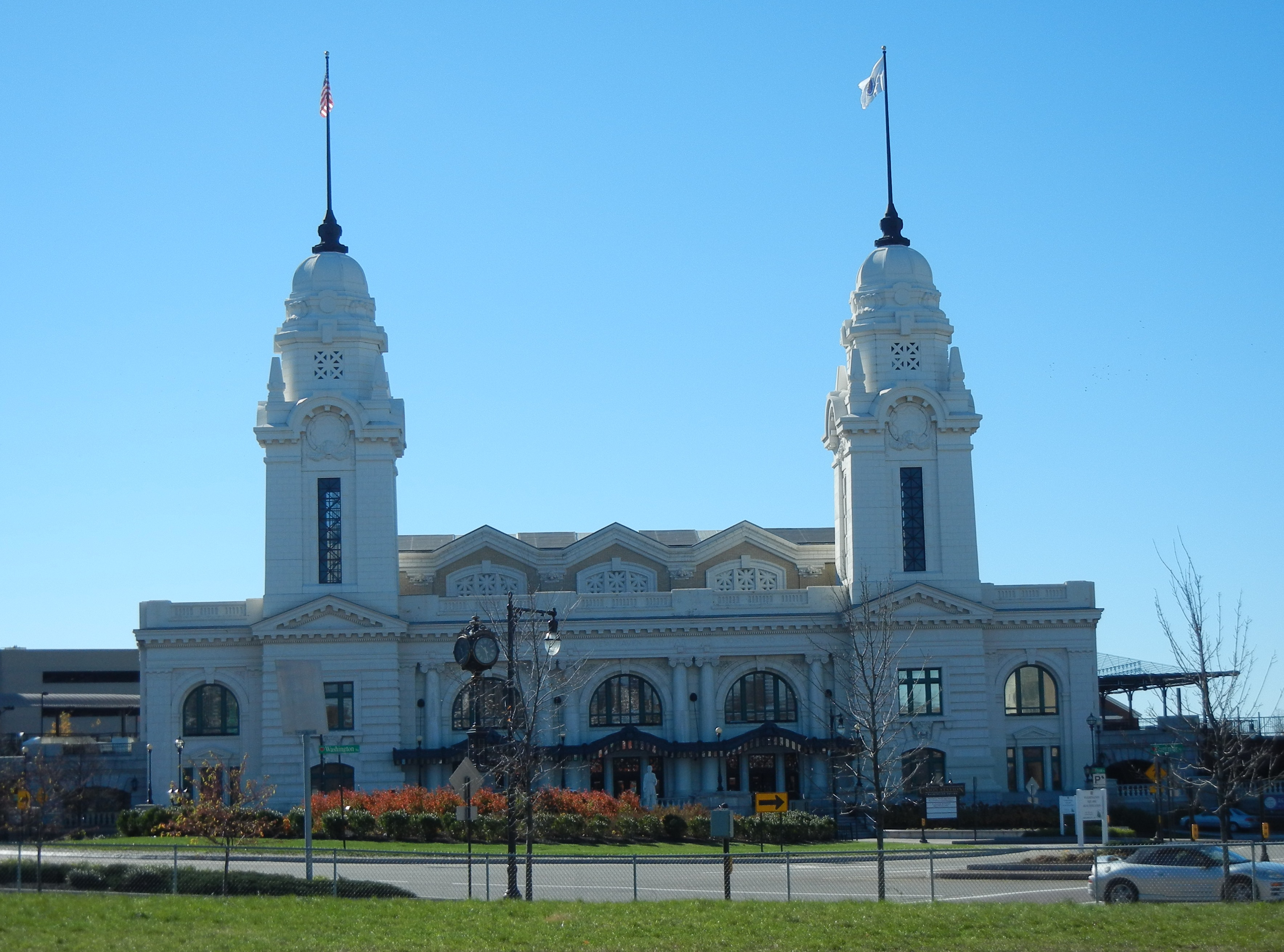
Union Station/ Washington Square

=== East Side ===
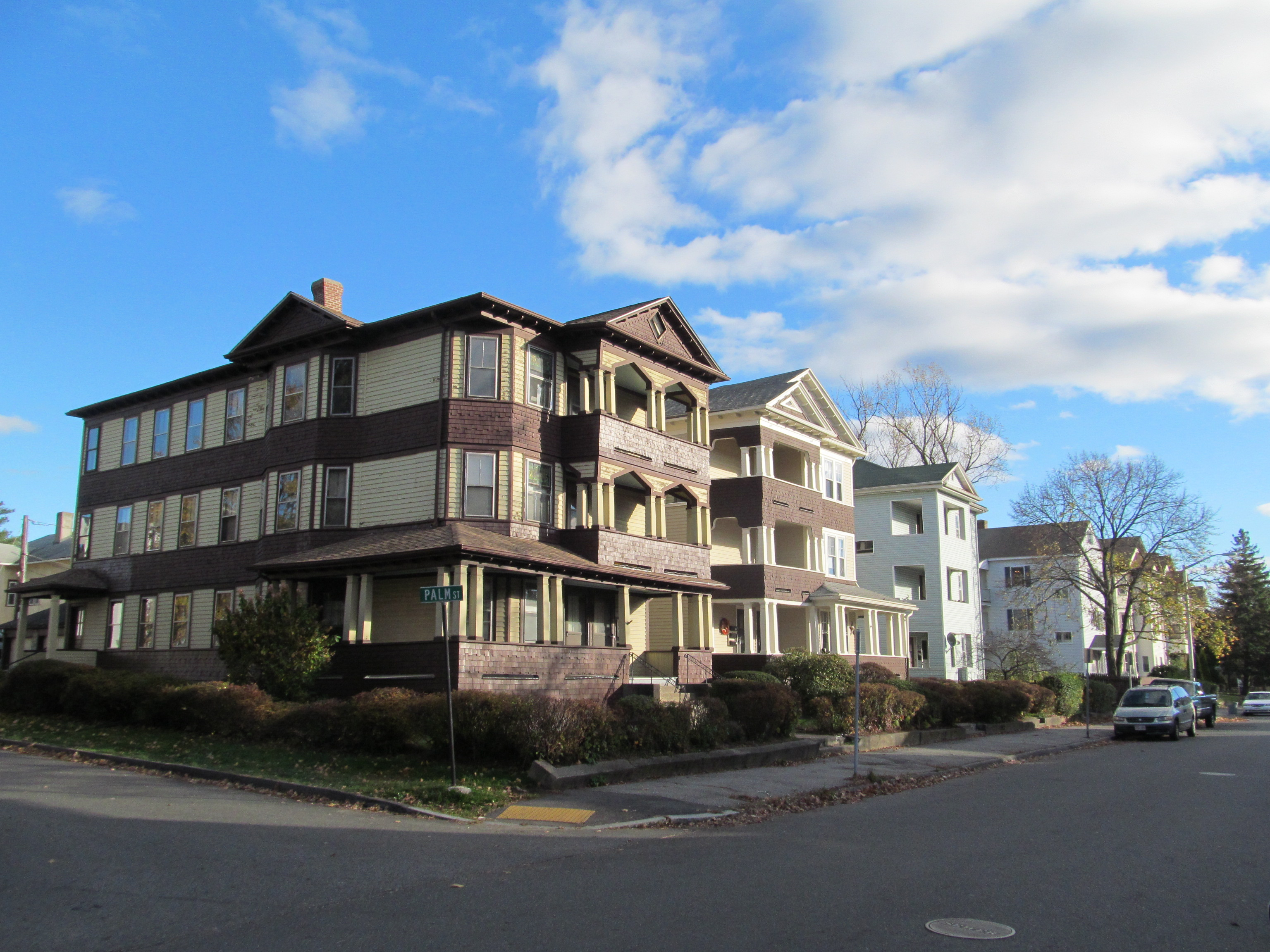
Houghton Street

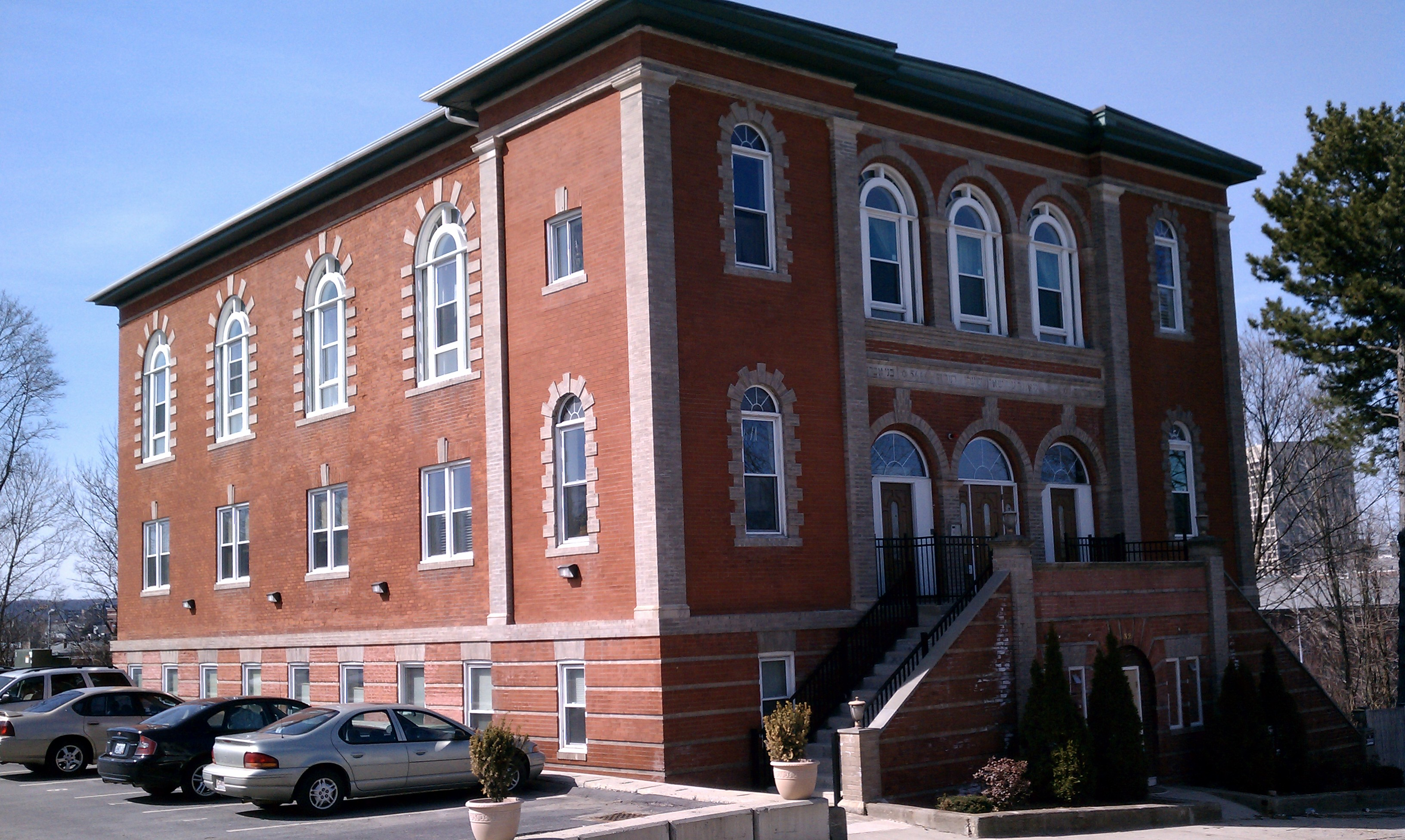
Shaarai Torah Synagogue

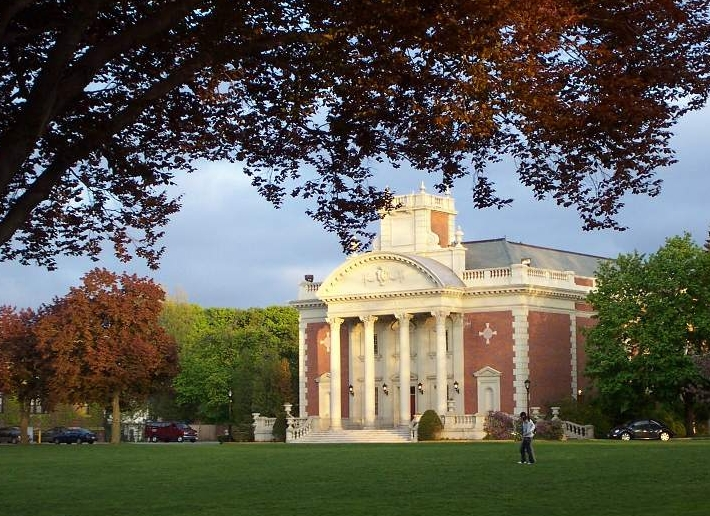
Worcester Academy

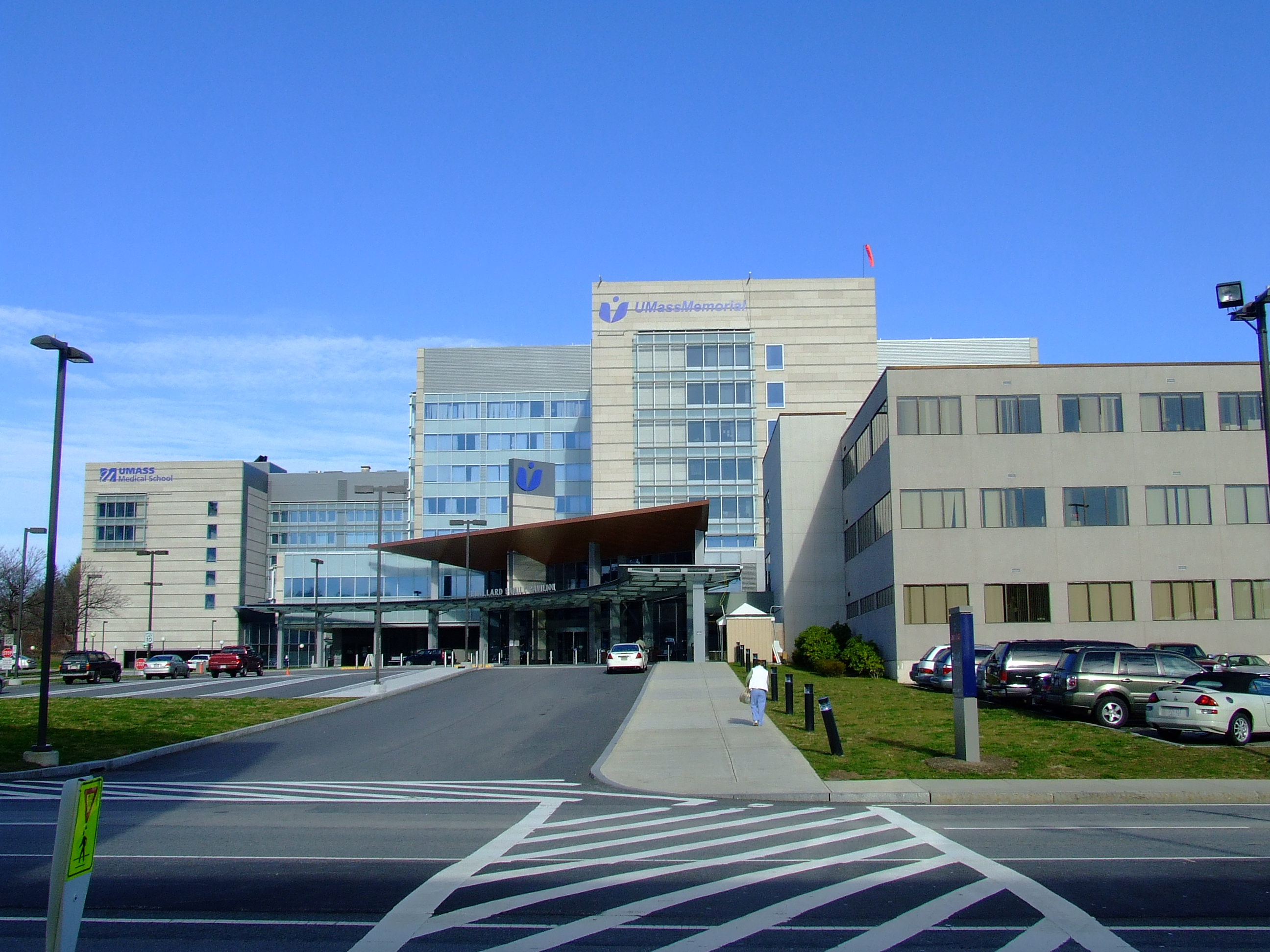
UMass Memorial Medical Center

=== North Worcester ===
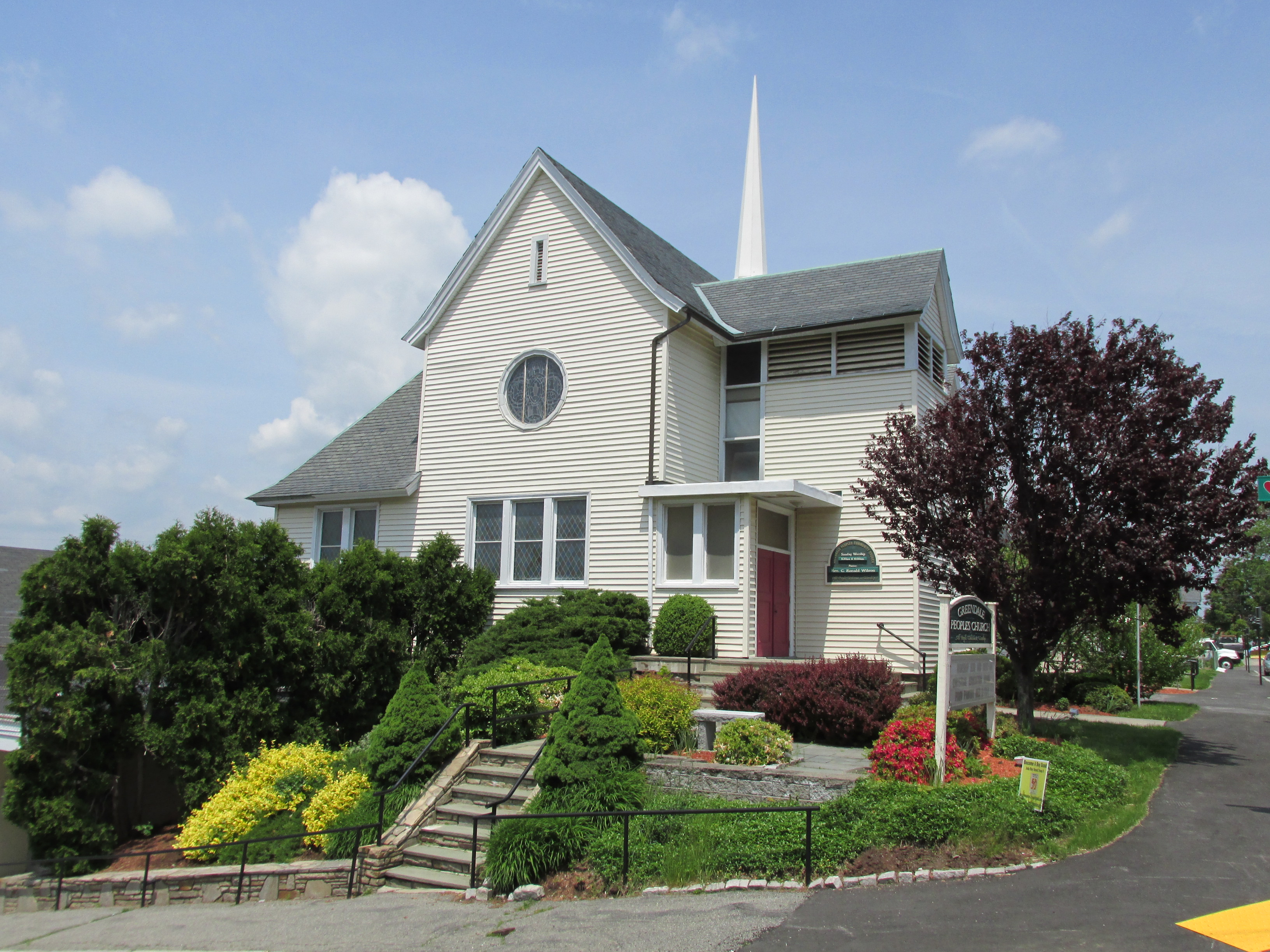
Greendale

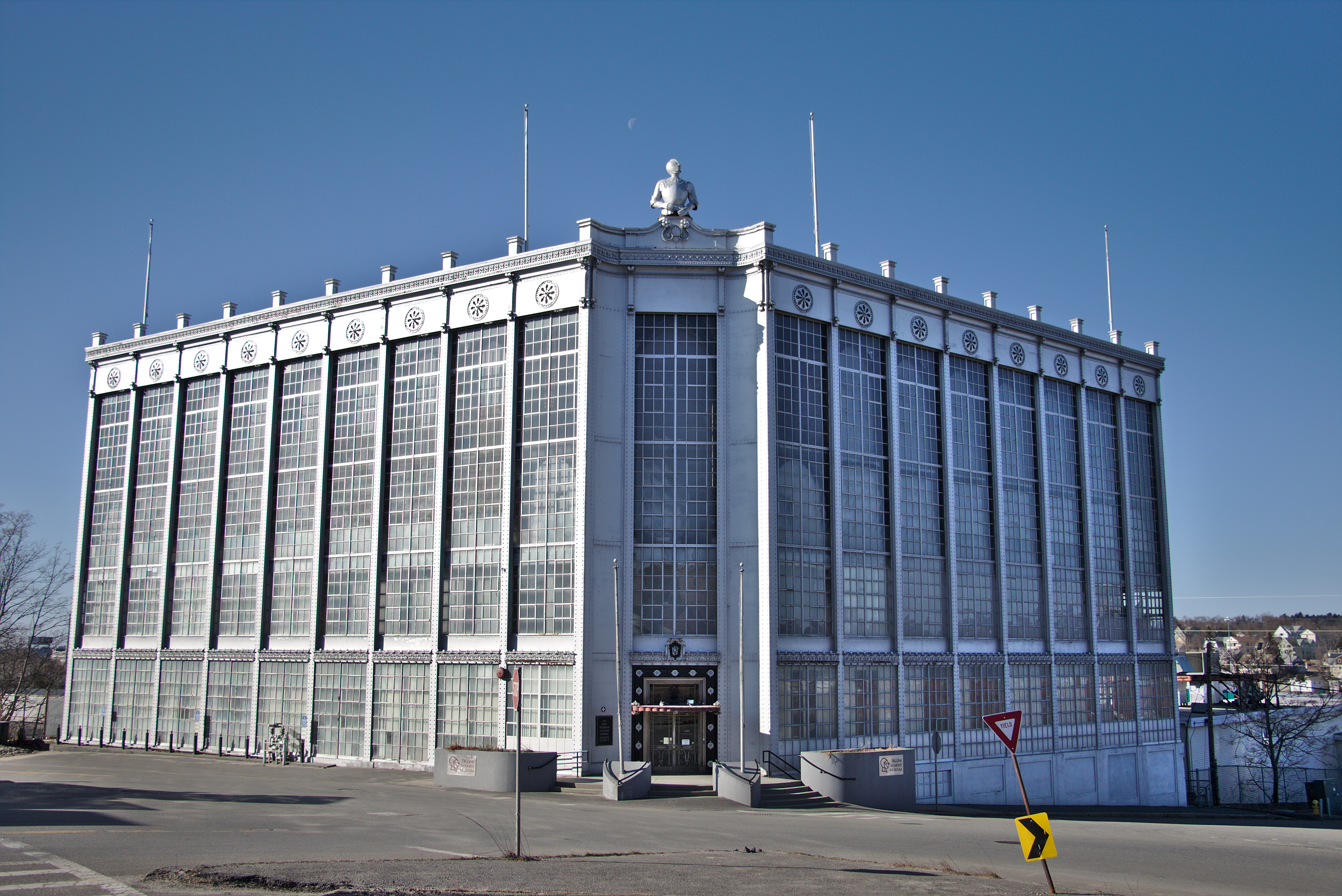
Higgins Armory Museum

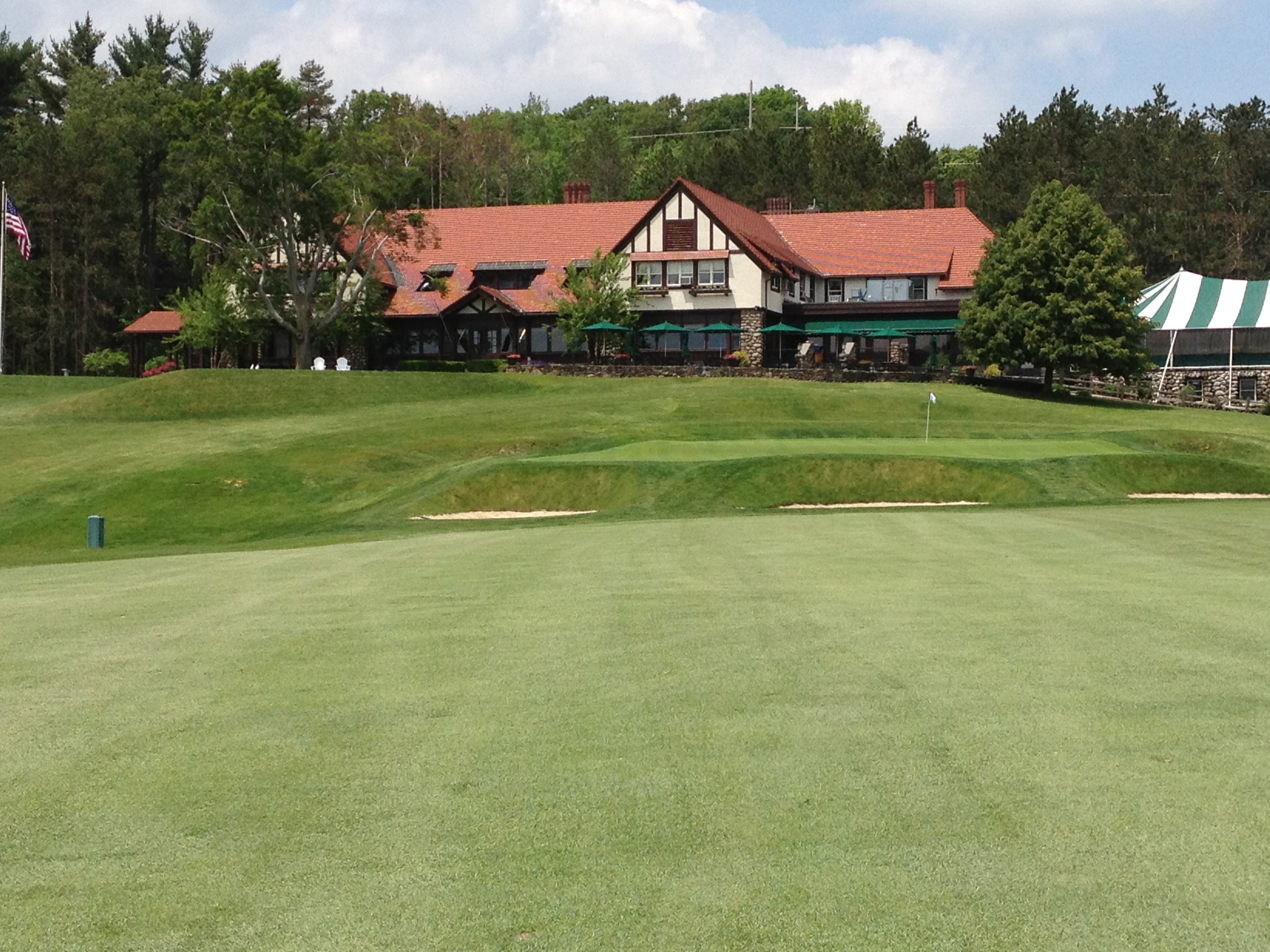
Worcester Country Club

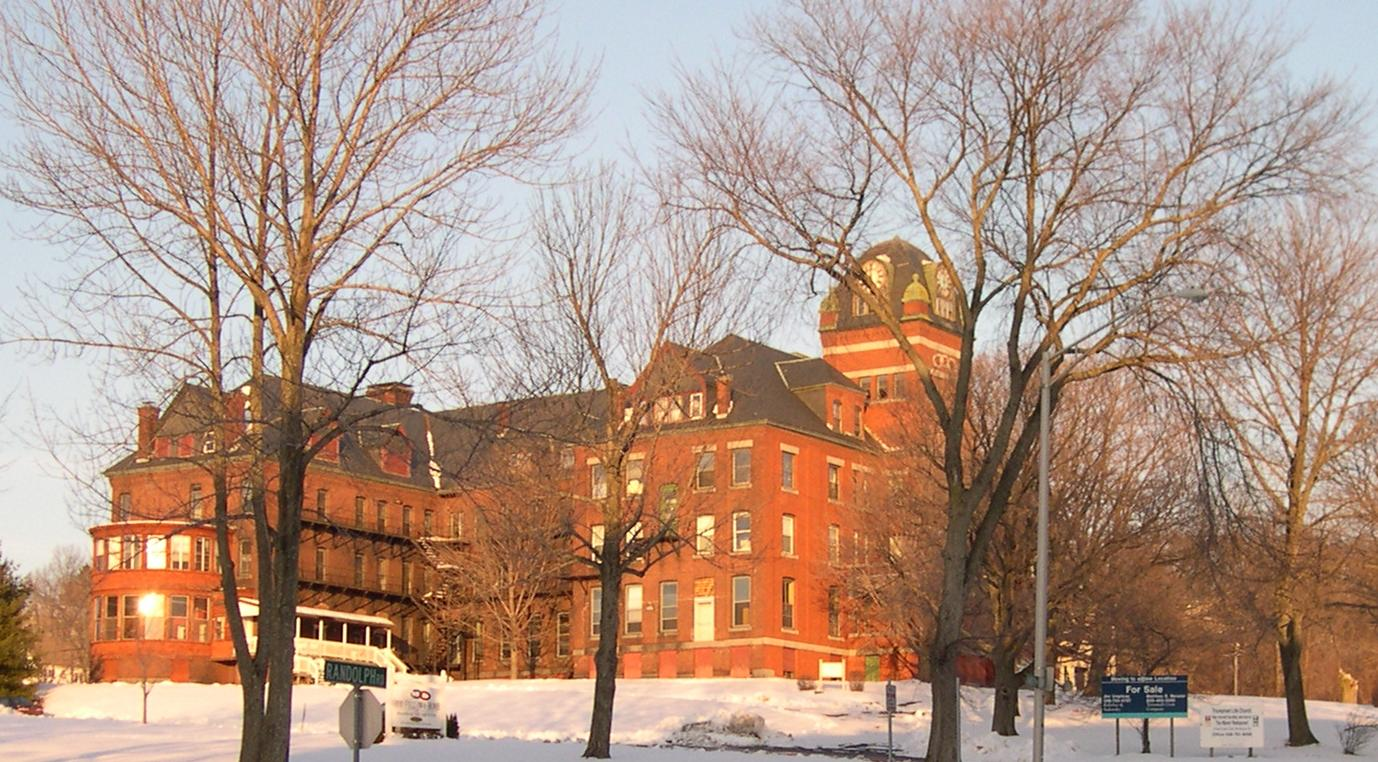
Odd Fellows' Home

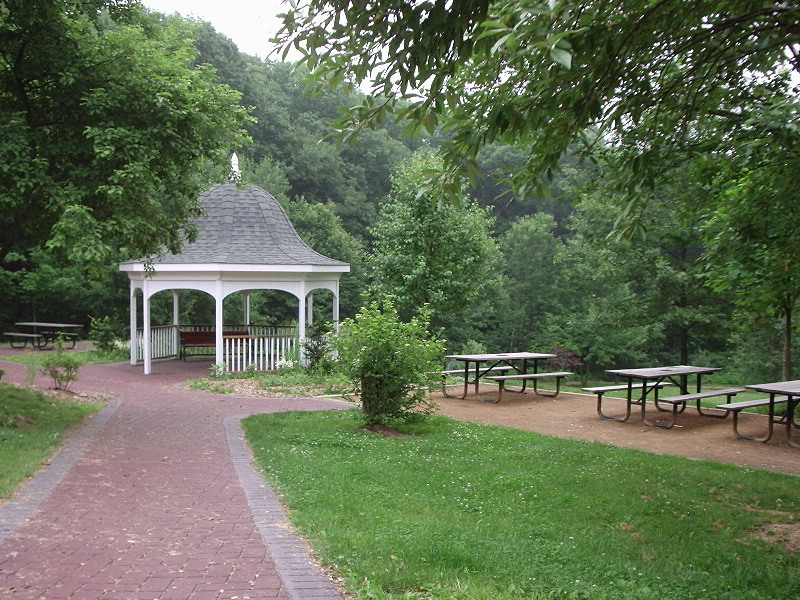
Dodge Park

=== South Worcester ===
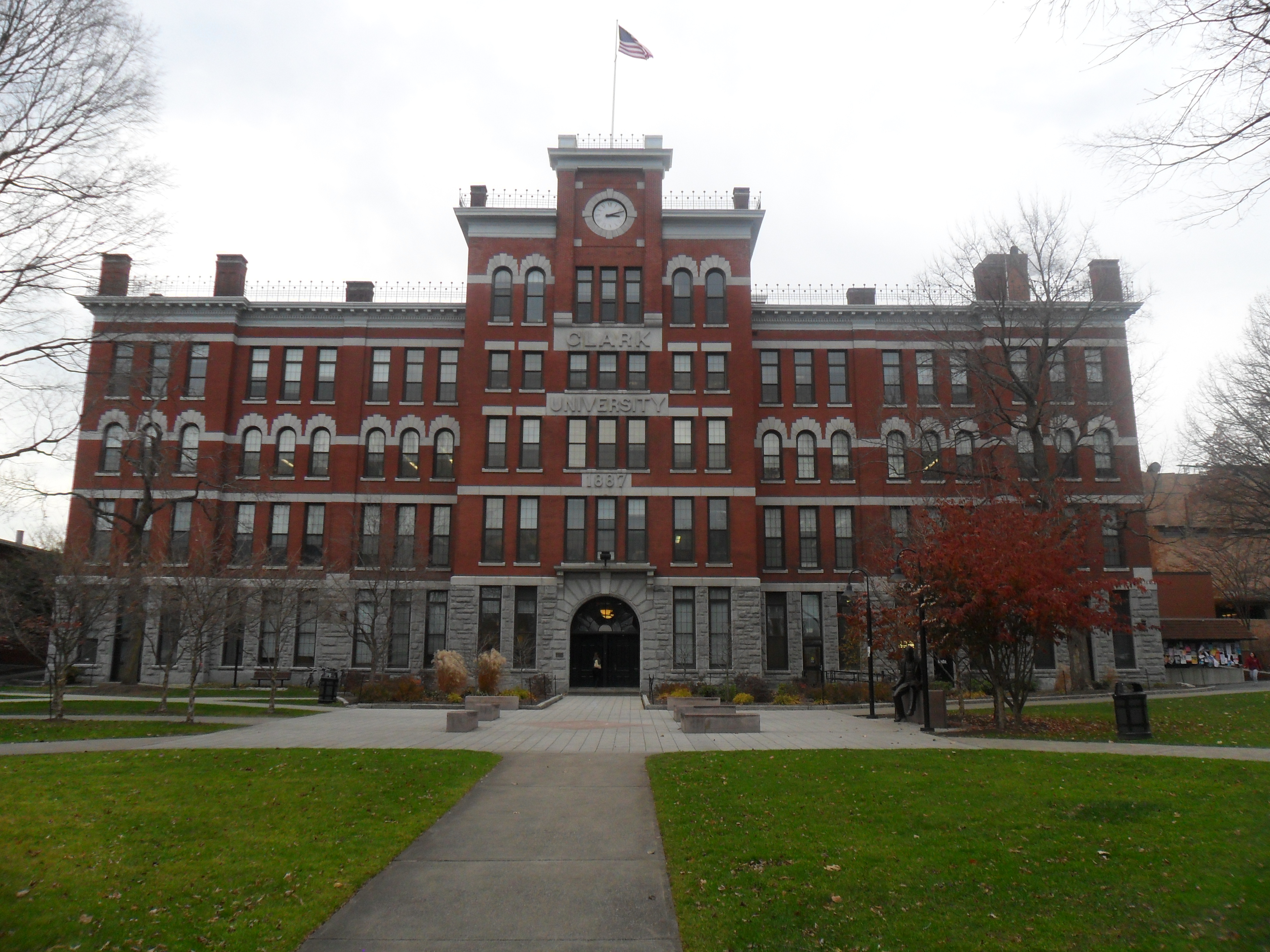
Clark University

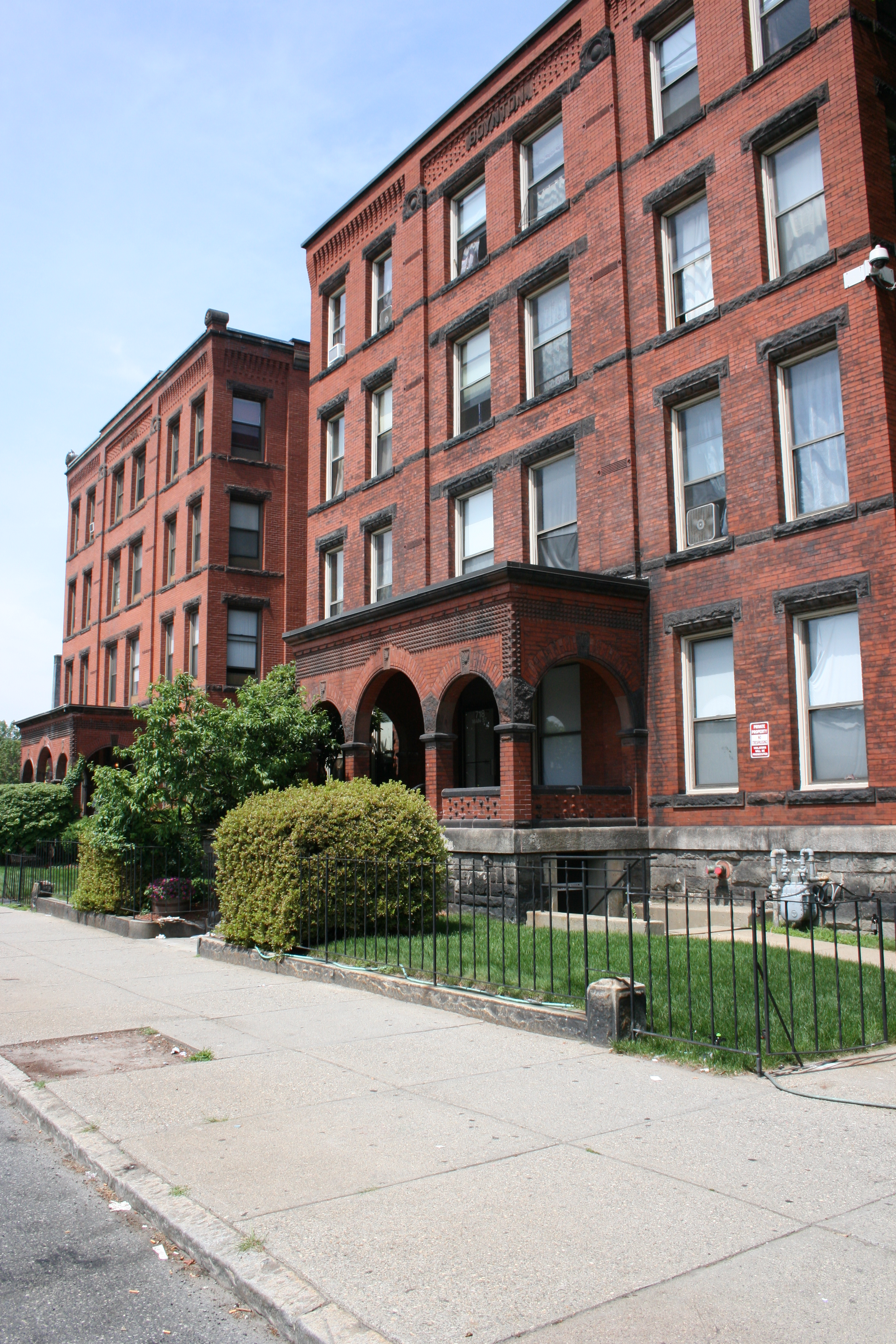
718-720 Main Street

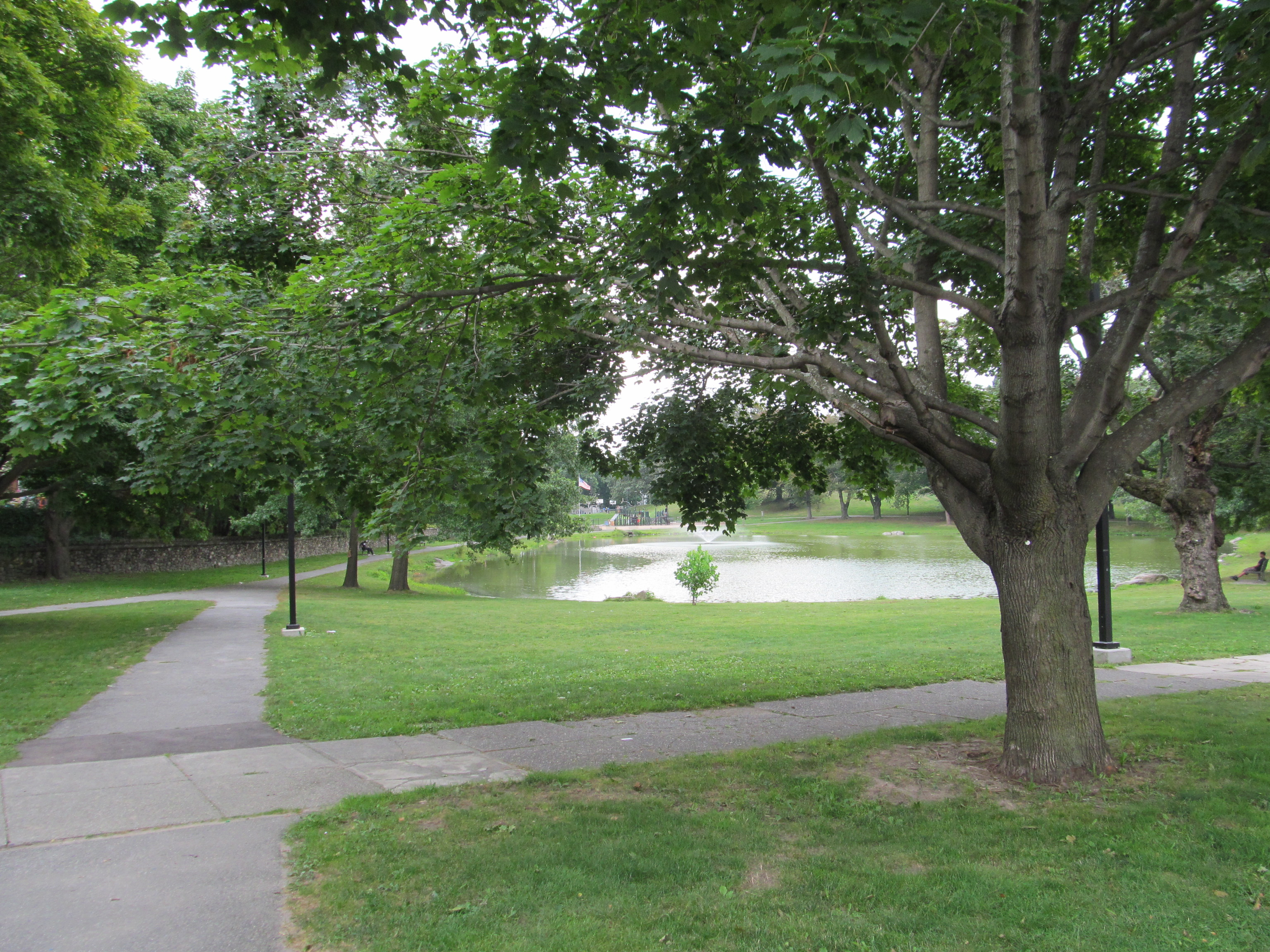
University Park

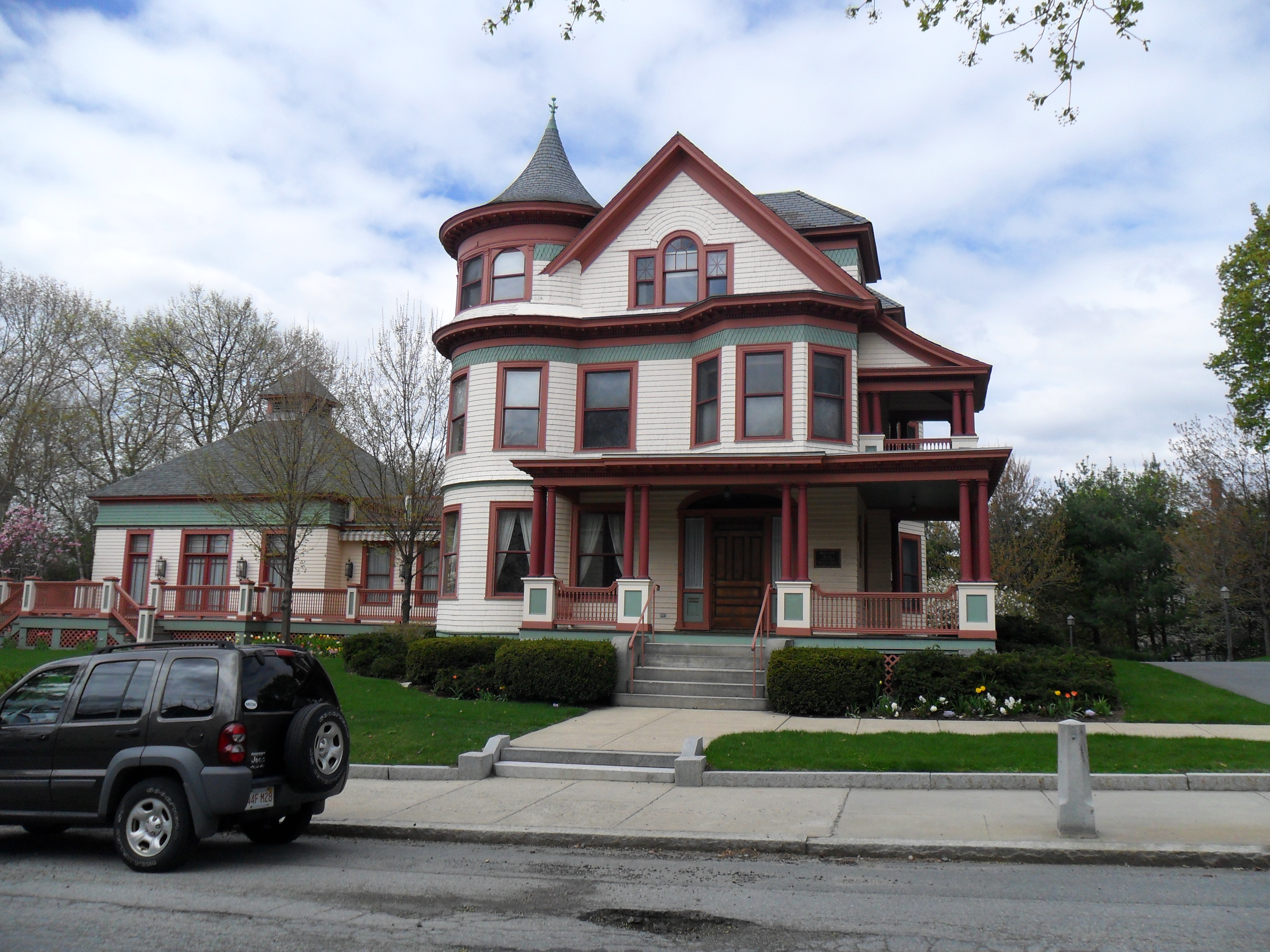
Woodland Street

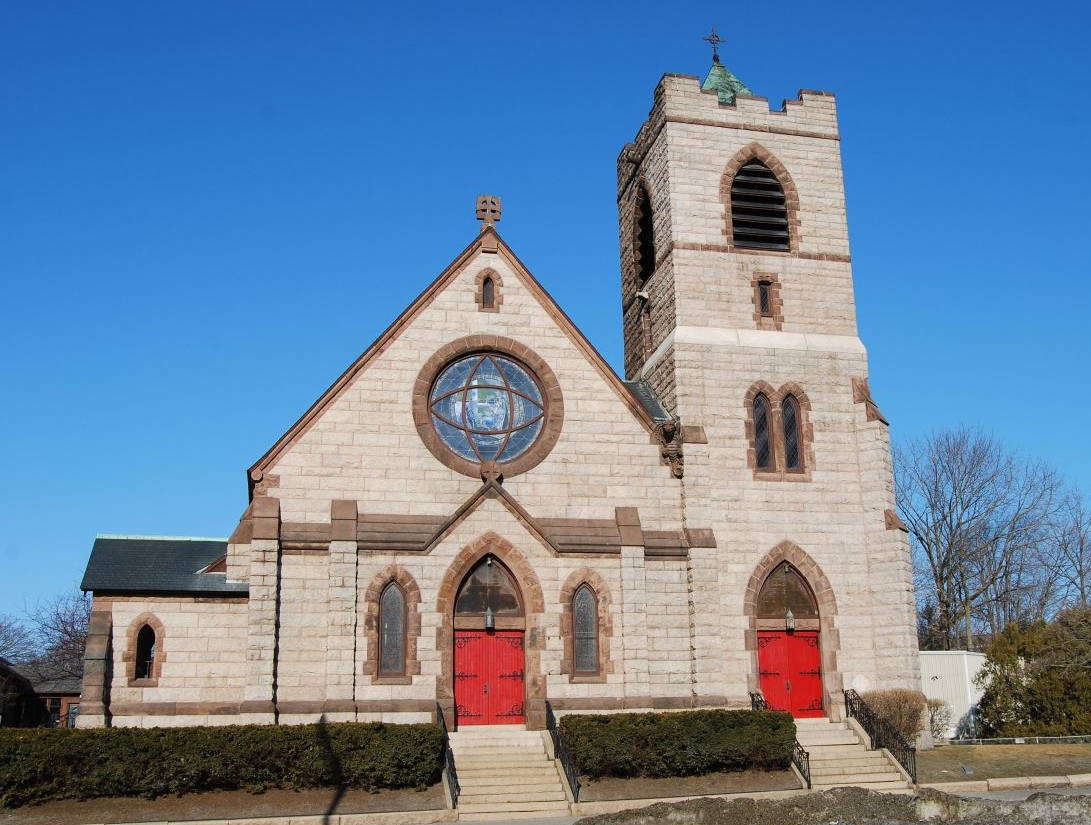
St. Matthews (Southbridge Street)

=== West Side ===
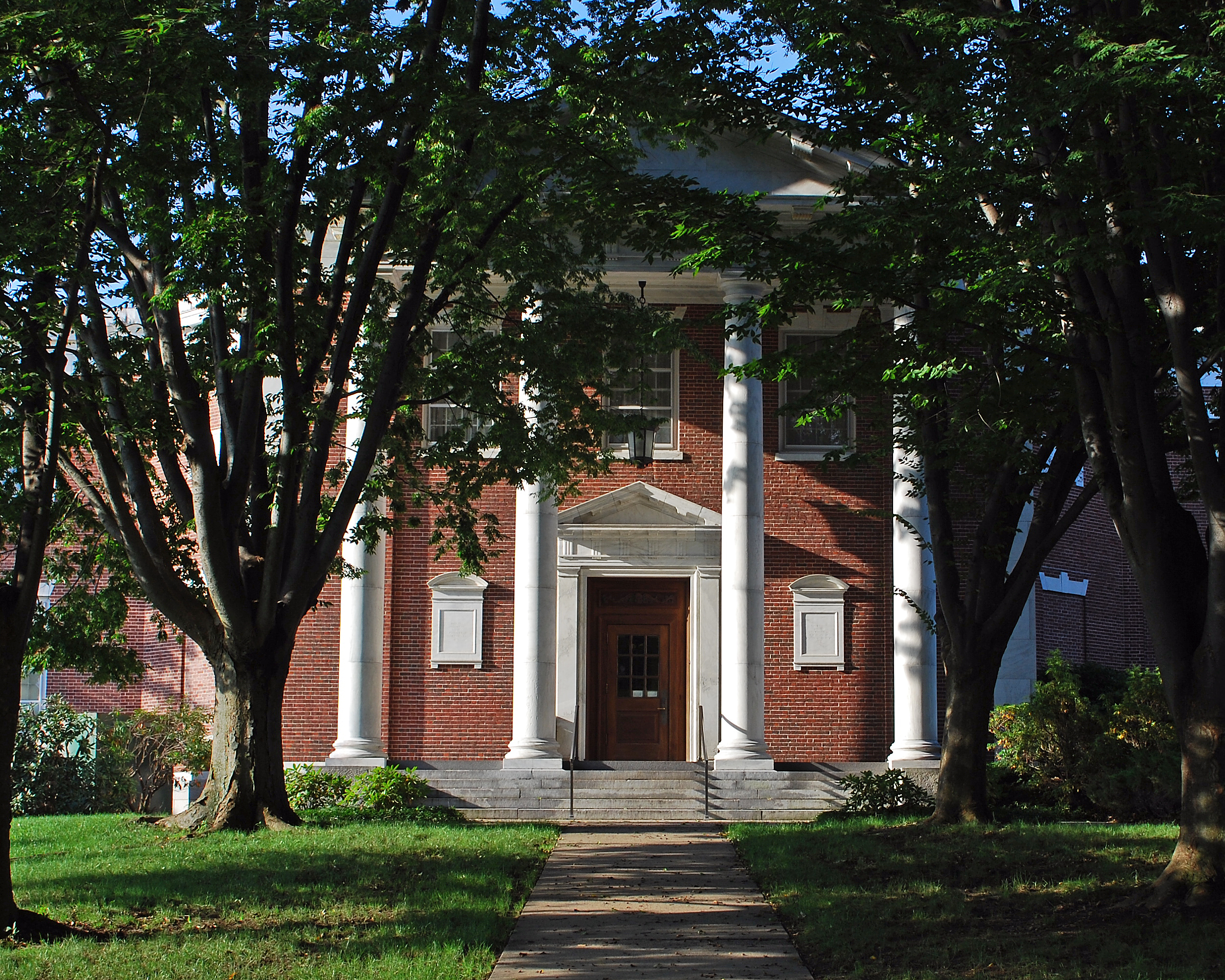
American Antiquarian Society

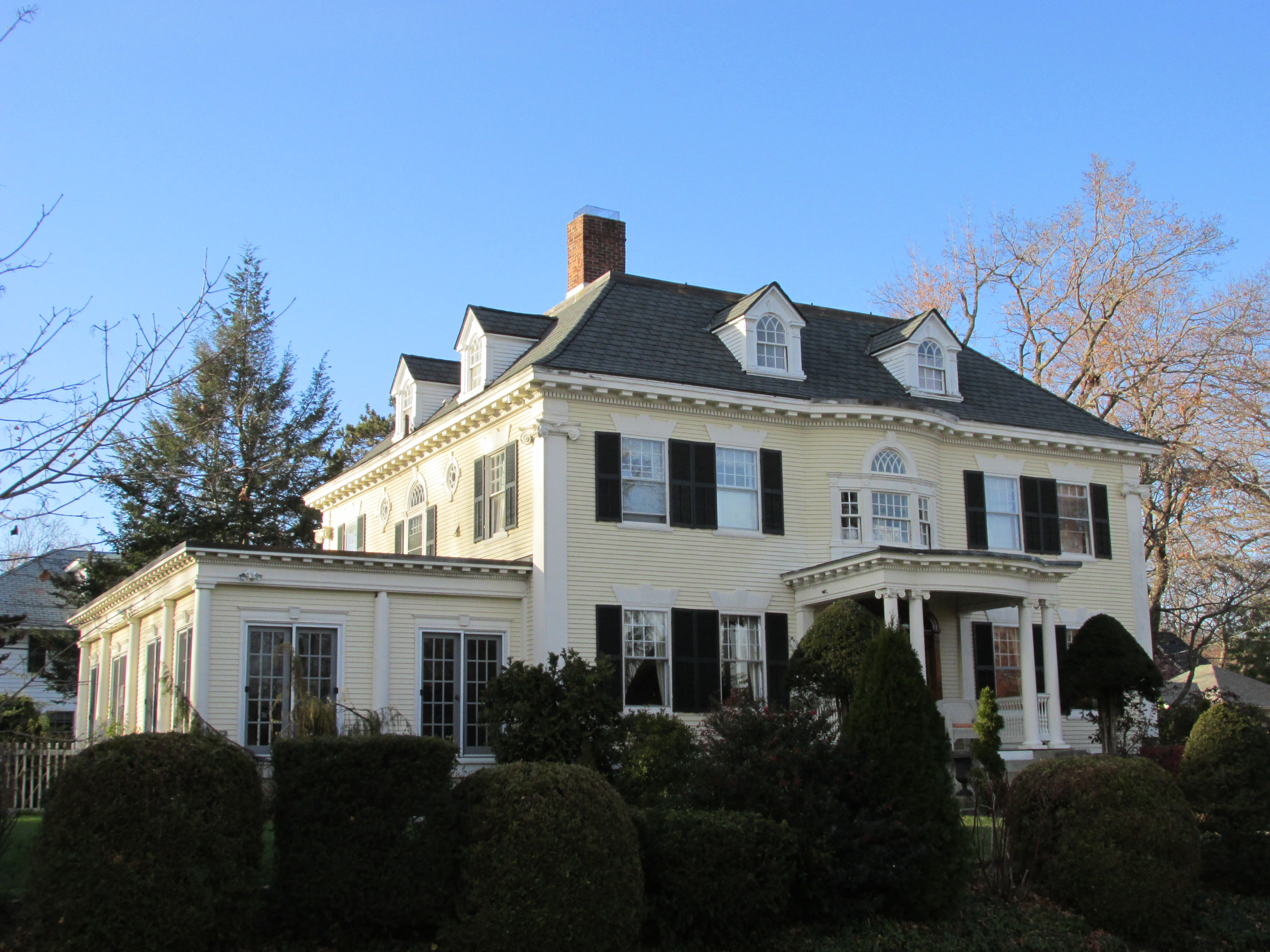
Lenox Street

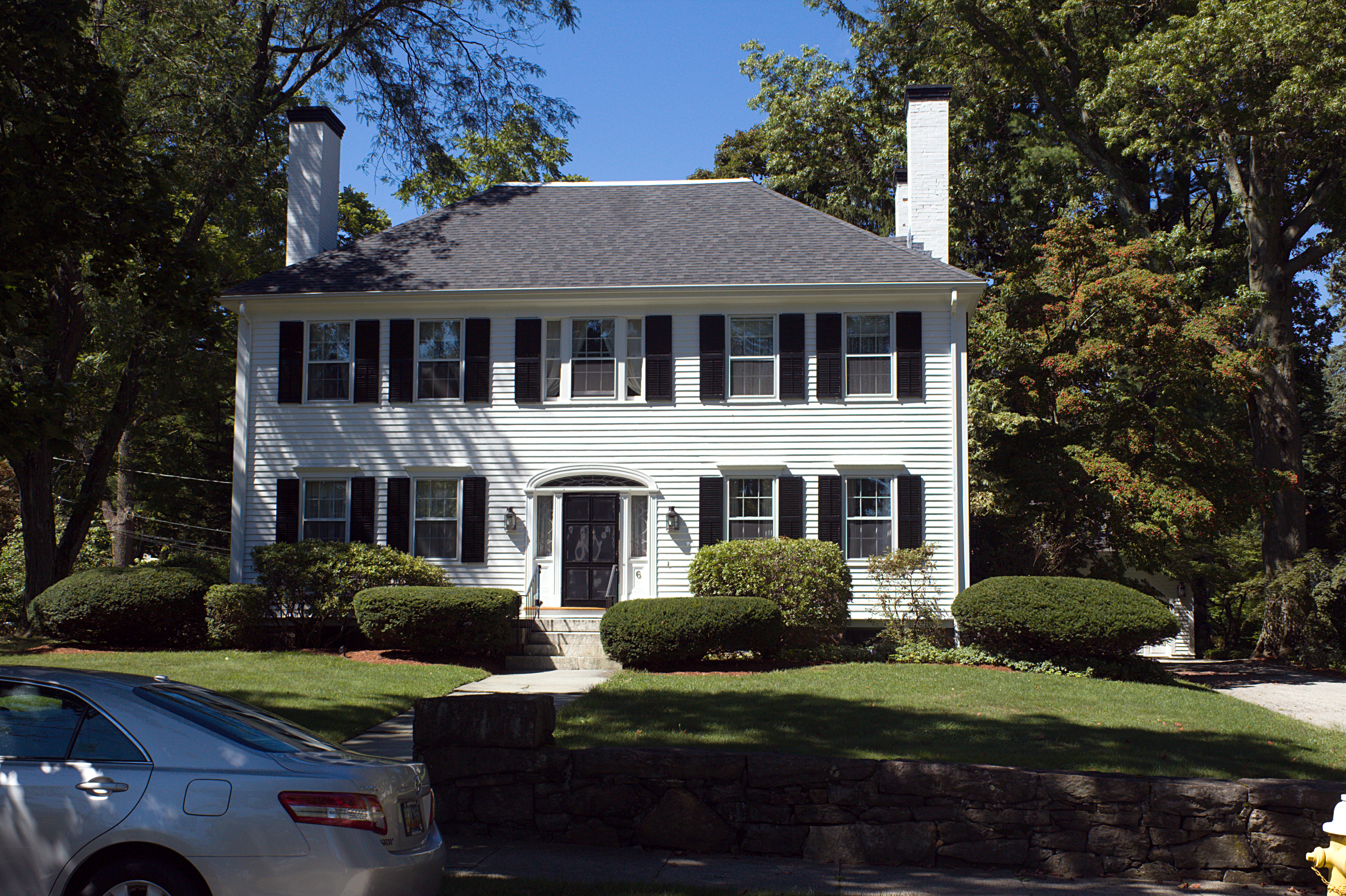
Mass Ave

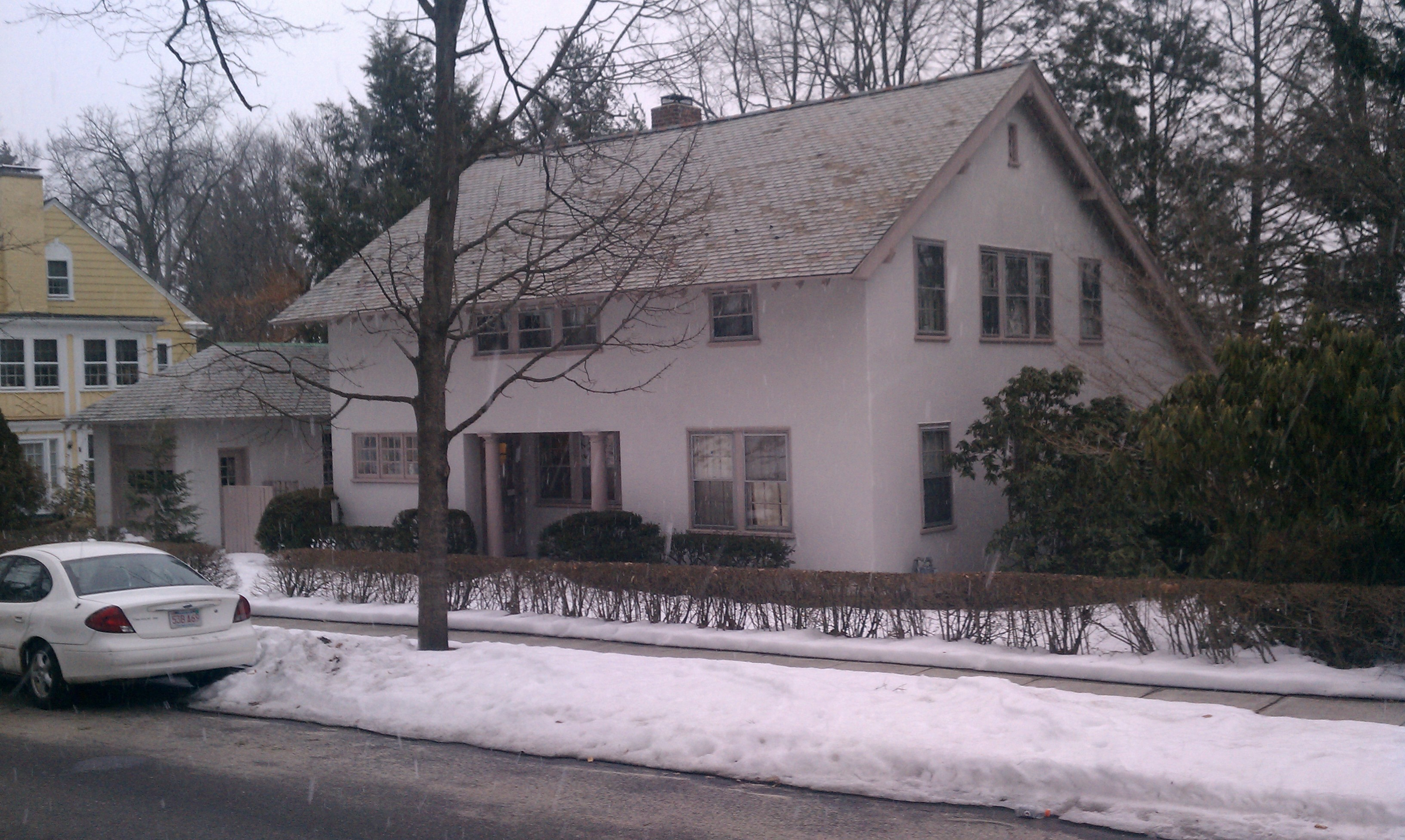
Montvale

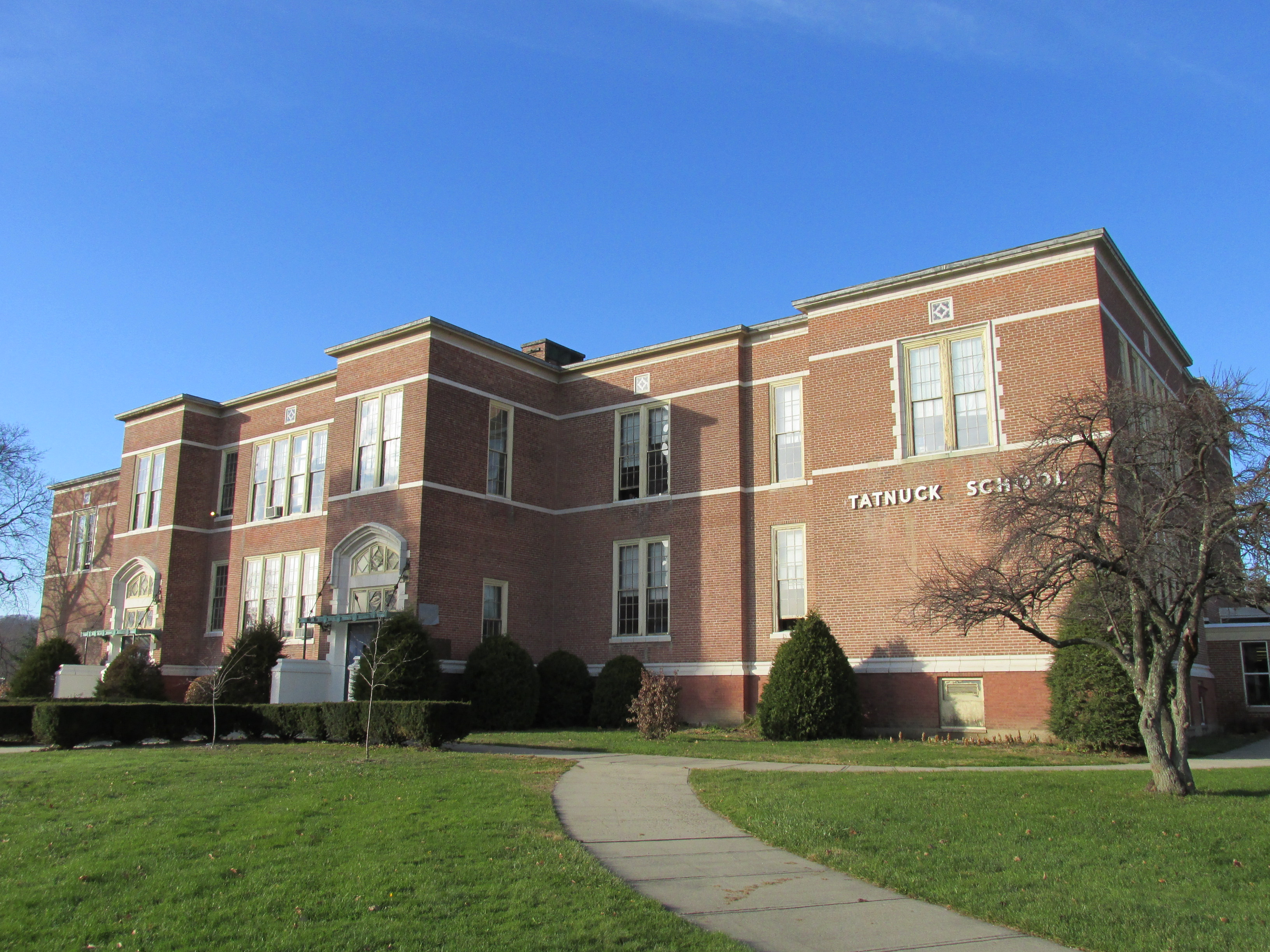
Tatnuck School

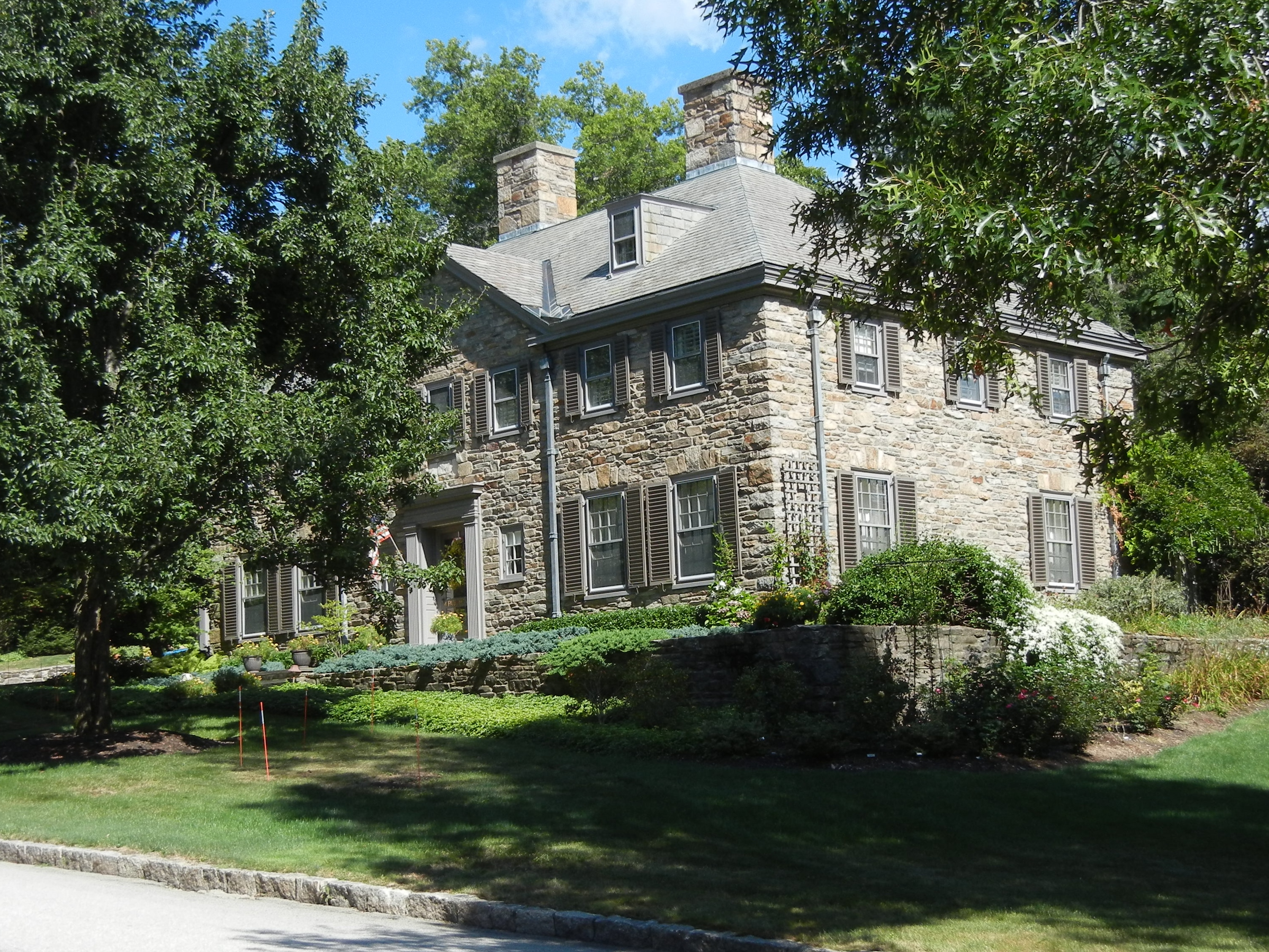
Westwood Hills
