= Massachusetts Avenue Historic District =

Massachusetts Avenue Historic District may refer to:

- Massachusetts Avenue Commercial District, listed on the NRHP in Indianapolis, Indiana
- Massachusetts Avenue Historic District (Worcester, Massachusetts), listed on the NRHP in Worcester, Massachusetts
- Massachusetts Avenue Historic District (Washington, D.C.), listed on the NRHP in Washington, D.C.
