= Burntcoat =

Burntcoat or Burncoat may refer to:

- Burncoat, a neighborhood in Worcester, Massachusetts, United States

- Burncoat High School

- Burntcoat, Nova Scotia, a community in Canada
- Burntcoat (novel), a 2021 novel by Sarah Hall
