= Lincoln Estate–Elm Park Historic District =

Historic district in Massachusetts, United States

- U.S. National Register of Historic Places
- U.S. Historic district
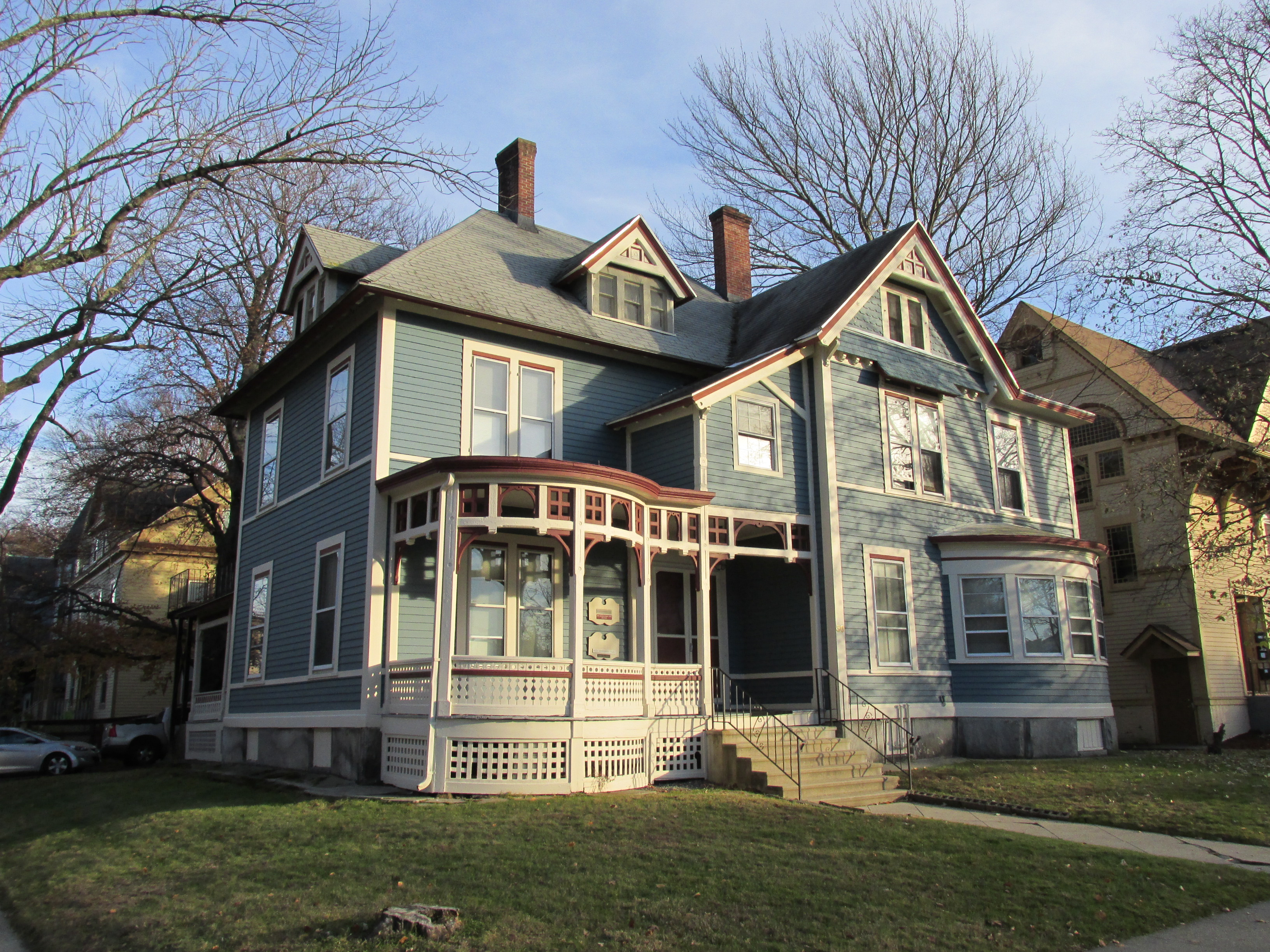
- Corner of Sever and Cedar Streets

- Location within Massachusetts Location within the United States
- Location: Properties along Cedar, Fruit, Oak, Sever, West, and William Sts., Worcester, Massachusetts
- Coordinates: 42°16′2″N 71°48′40″W
- Built: 1847
- Architect: Multiple
- Architectural style: Second Empire, Queen Anne, Shingle Style
- MPS: Worcester MRA
- NRHP reference No.: 80000570
- Added to NRHP: March 05, 1980

The Lincoln Estate–Elm Park Historic District is an expansive residential area in northwestern Worcester, Massachusetts. It is centered on Cedar and William Streets, and includes properties on adjacent streets. The area was developed beginning in the late 1830s by former Governor of Massachusetts Levi Lincoln Jr., a Worcester native who had inherited land in the area. The district was divided and developed by Lincoln until his death, and then by his heirs, and became a popular location for homes of Worcester's wealthy and elite, many of which were designed by architects.

The district was listed on the National Register of Historic Places in 1980.

== See also ==
- National Register of Historic Places listings in northwestern Worcester, Massachusetts
- National Register of Historic Places listings in Worcester County, Massachusetts
- Neighborhoods of Worcester, Massachusetts
