= Massachusetts Avenue Historic District (Worcester, Massachusetts) =

Historic district in Massachusetts, United States

- U.S. National Register of Historic Places
- U.S. Historic district
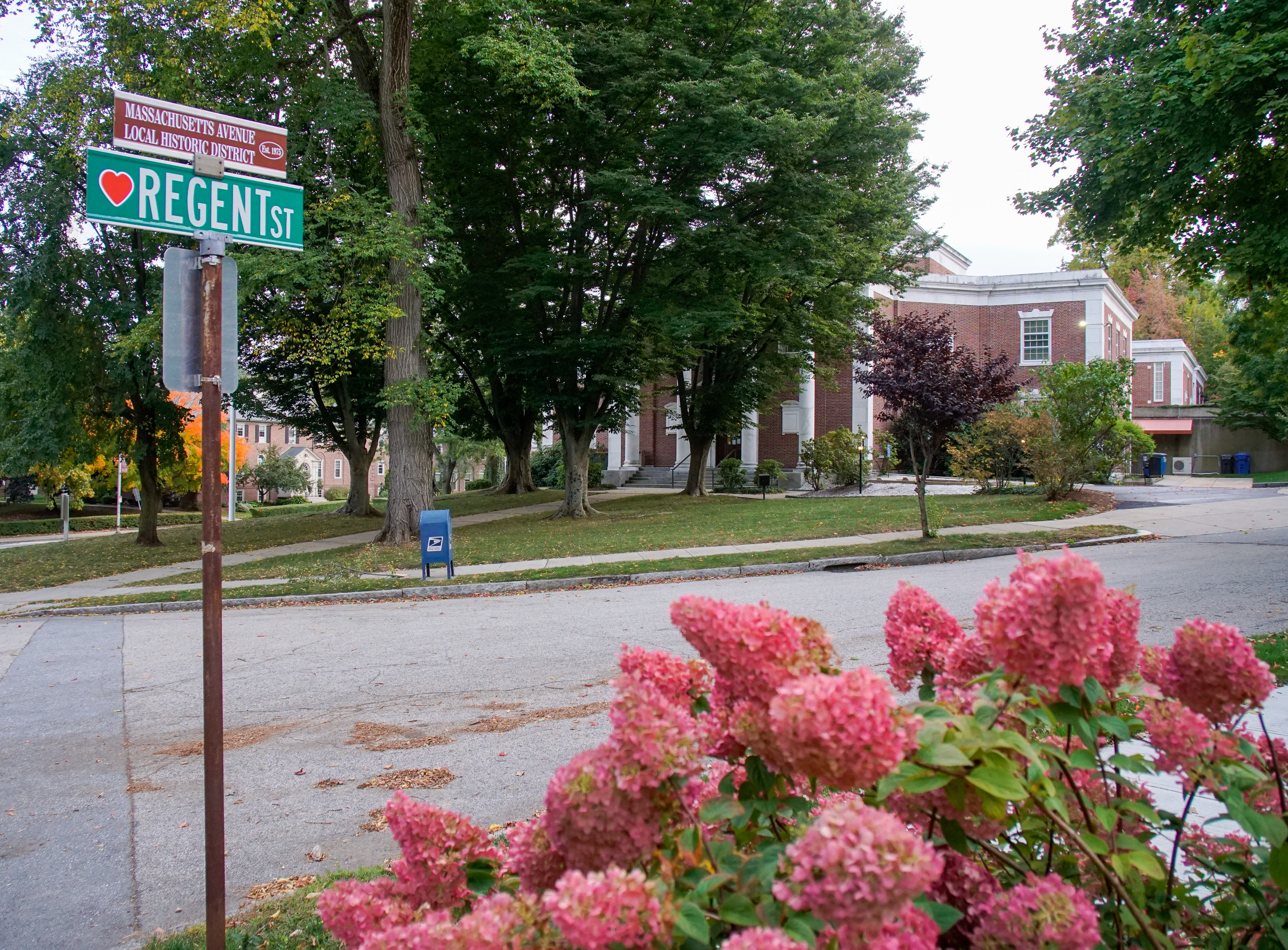

- Location within Massachusetts Location within the United States
- Location: Between Salisbury St. and Drury Lane, Worcester, Massachusetts
- Coordinates: 42°16′42″N 71°48′44″W
- Area: 5 acres (2.0 ha)
- Built: 1751
- Architect: Salisbury, Stephen; Multiple
- Architectural style: Colonial Revival, Colonial, Queen Anne
- MPS: Worcester MRA
- NRHP reference No.: 71000356
- Added to NRHP: December 16, 1971

The Massachusetts Avenue Historic District in Worcester, Massachusetts is a 5-acre (2.0 ha) historic district that was listed on the National Register of Historic Places in 1971. At that time, it included 11 contributing buildings and one other contributing site.

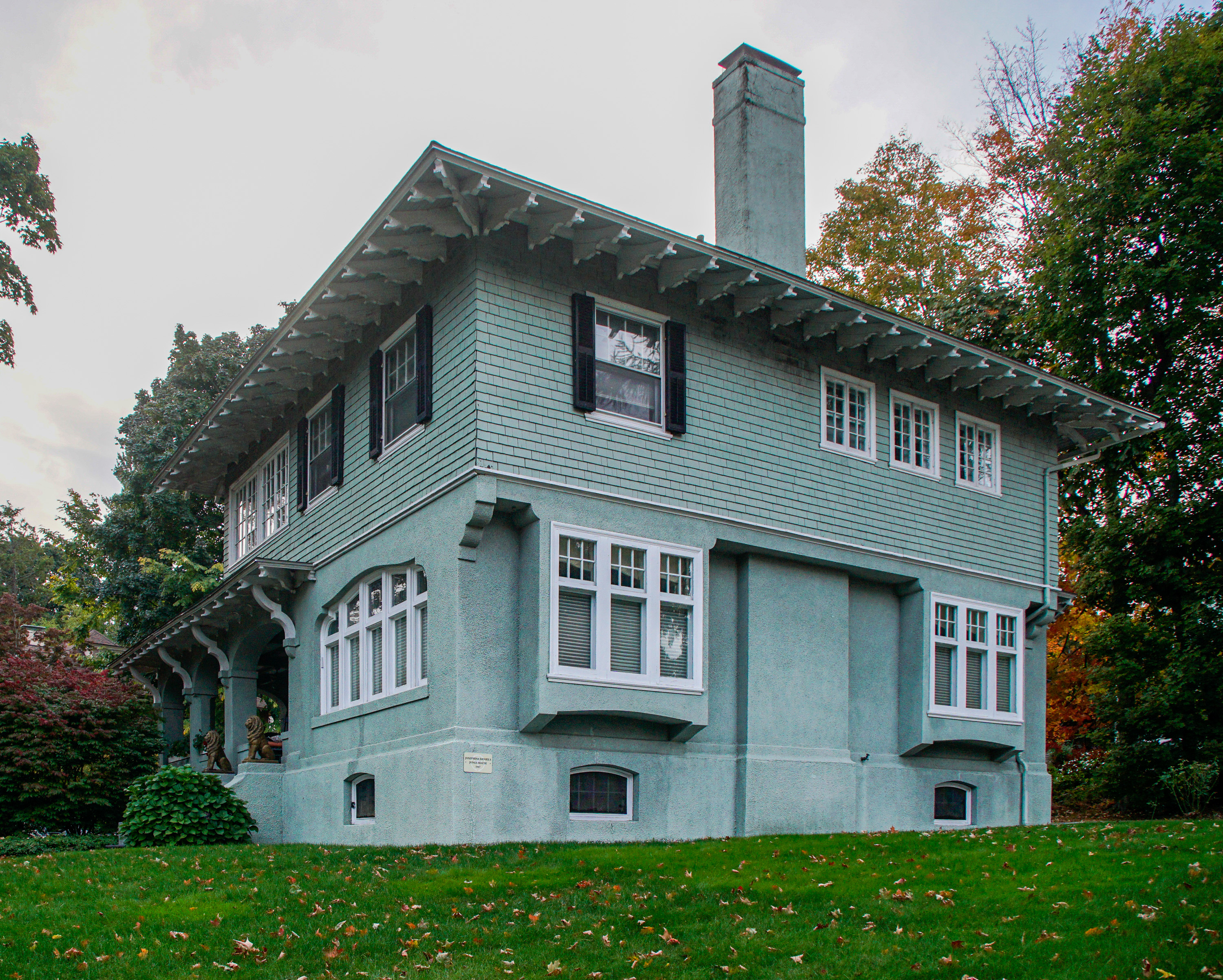
Josephine Daniels Jones House (1907)

This district, the Montvale Historic District, and the Hammond Heights Historic District, are northwest of the Worcester core area and are elaborate Victorian districts. They were created for upper class housing through the subdivision of many farms and estates, when southern and eastern sections of Worcester were filling up with three-decker working class housing.

It includes a Federal style former courthouse that was converted, during 1801–03, into a Federal style house. It includes houses of the Arts and Crafts movement, Prairie style and Bungalow style.

== See also ==
- National Register of Historic Places listings in northwestern Worcester, Massachusetts
- National Register of Historic Places listings in Worcester County, Massachusetts
