= Grafton Hill =

Coordinates: 42°15′09.59″N 71°45′33.34″W

Union Hill, also referred to as Grafton Hill and originally known as Sagatabscot Hill is a neighborhood in Worcester, Massachusetts (the second-largest city in New England). Located in the southeastern part of the city and anchored by Grafton Street and Providence Street, Union Hill is one of the seven major hills of the city. (Like Rome and Jerusalem, Worcester is known for being built atop seven hills.) According to the city government, the seven hills are Hancock, Bancroft, Newton, Green, Chandler, Union (Sagatabscot) and Mt. St. James (College Hill).

== See also ==
- Neighborhoods in Worcester, Massachusetts
