= University Park (Worcester, Massachusetts) =

Public park in Worcester, Massachusetts

Coordinates: 42°14′50.8″N 71°49′18.9″W

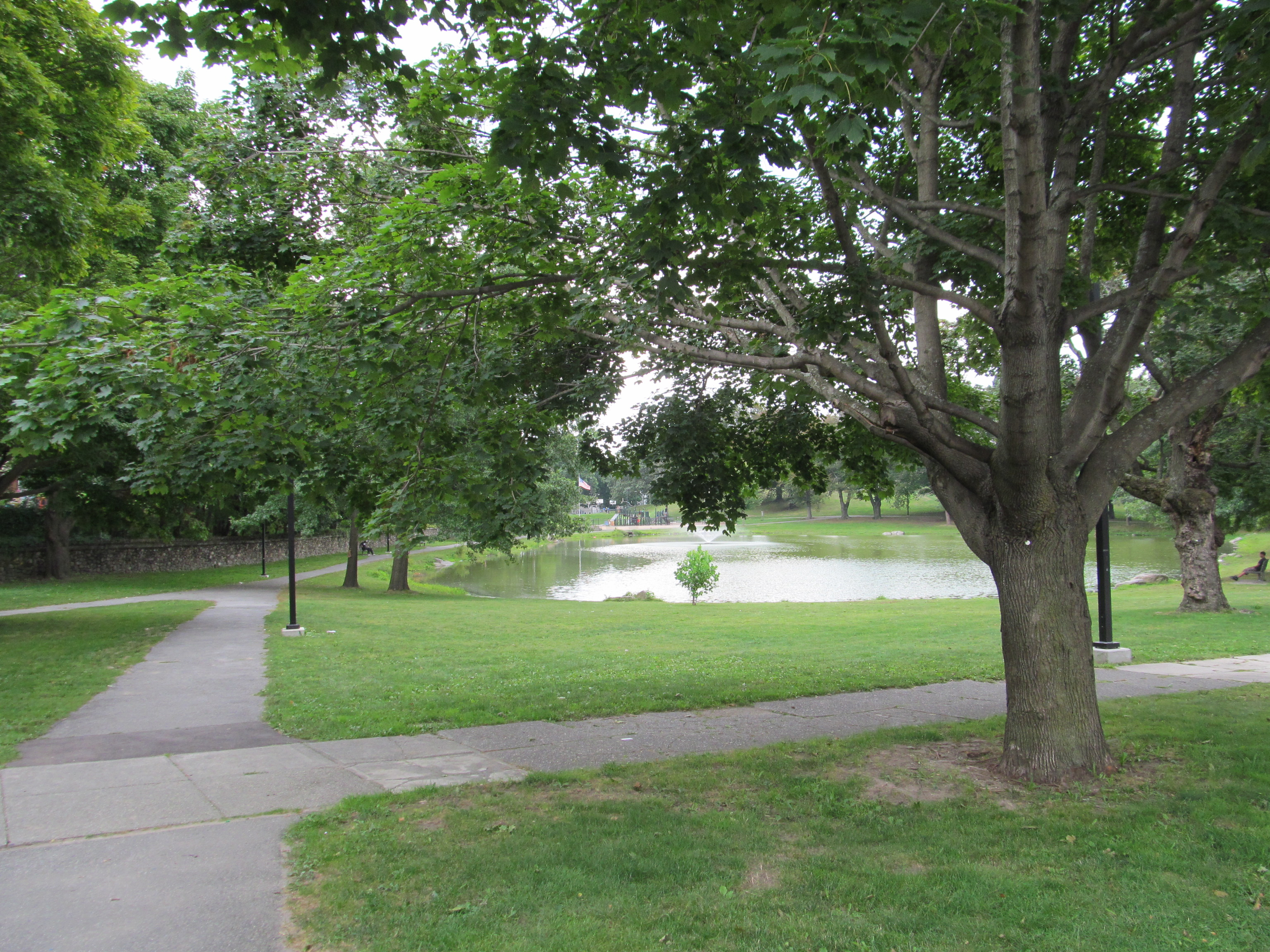
University Park

University Park, also called Crystal Park, is a public park in the Main South neighborhood of Worcester, Massachusetts. The 13-acre (53,000 m^{2}) park was acquired by the city from 1887 to 1889, costing nearly 62,000 dollars. It is located across Main Street from Clark University, thus the name. University Park Campus School, a local nearby public high school founded with help from Clark, is named after the park.

On September 20, 2010, Clark University announced a "20-year voluntary Payment in Lieu of Taxes agreement" with the City of Worcester, with some of the funds going directly to improvements in University Park. On March 24, 2011, the $1.5 million park redevelopment project was formally announced, and residents were informed that there would be a several-month-long community engagement and participatory planning process.
