= Montvale (Worcester, Massachusetts) =

- U.S. National Register of Historic Places
- U.S. Historic district
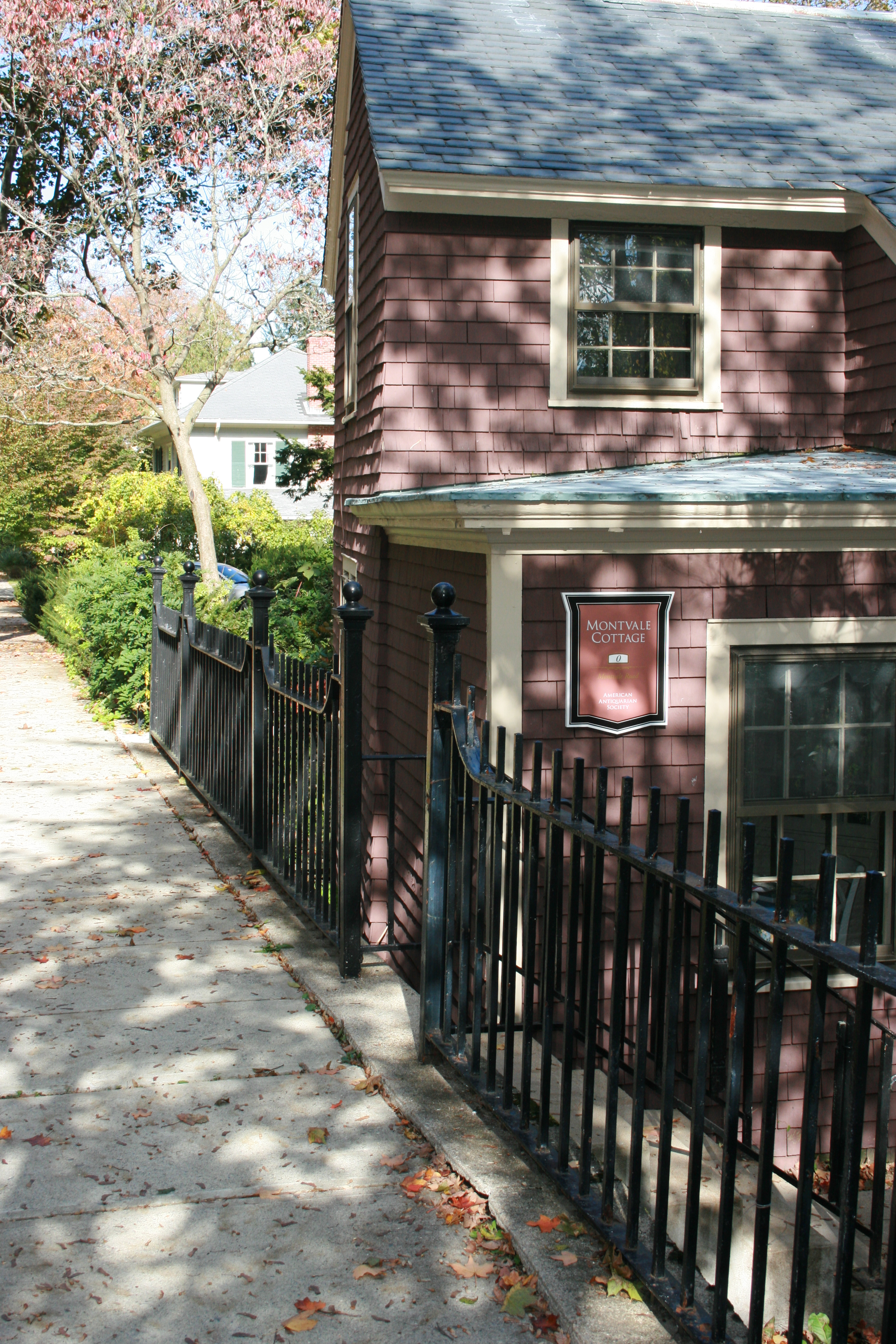

- Location within Massachusetts Location within the United States
- Location: Properties along Montvale, Monadnock, Sagamore, Waconah, and Whitman Rds., and Salisbury St., Worcester, Massachusetts
- Coordinates: 42°16′52″N 71°48′43″W
- Built: 1851; 175 years ago
- Architectural style: Colonial Revival, Greek Revival, Victorian, Queen Anne
- MPS: Worcester MRA
- NRHP reference No.: 80000521
- Added to NRHP: March 05, 1980

Montvale is a residential historic district in northwestern Worcester, Massachusetts. It is a portion of a subdivision laid out in 1897 on the estate of Jared Whitman, Jr., whose property contained a single house, now 246 Salisbury Street. The central portion of this house was built in 1851 in a conventional Greek Revival style, and was expanded with the addition of side wings by the developers of the 1897 subdivision, H. Ballard and M. O. Wheelock.

Ballard and Wheelock laid out 73 lots on the Whitman property, on which a large number of fine Queen Anne Victorian and Colonial Revival houses were built. The district contains 37 properties, including the Whitman house and 36 others built between 1897 and 1924. This cluster of houses is centered on Whitman Road between Sagamore Road and Salisbury Street, and also includes properties on Waconah and Monadnock Roads.

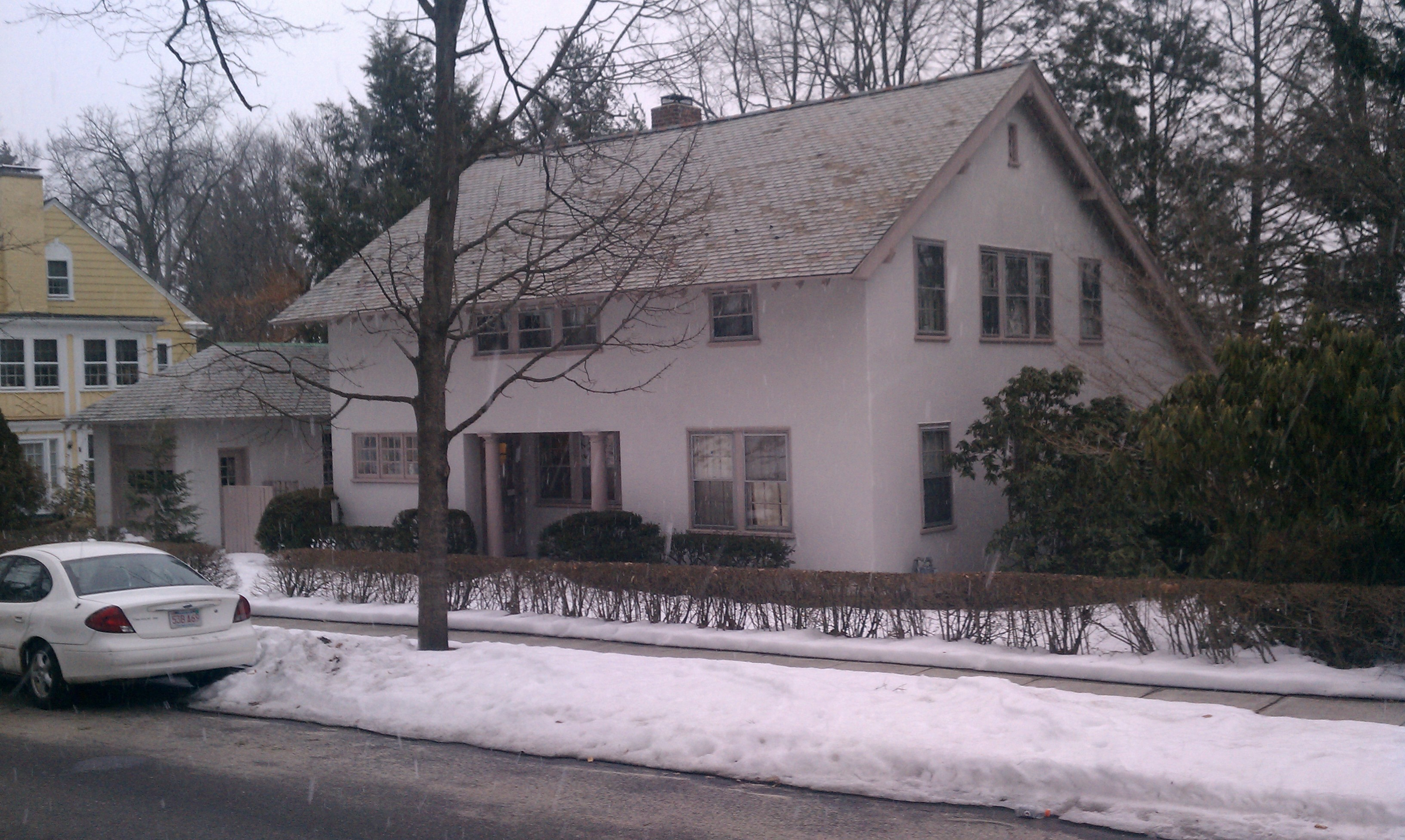
5 Montvale Road

One of the more notable houses in the district is a Queen Anne/Shingle style house at 254 Salisbury Street, built in 1897 to a design by prominent architect George Clemence. Other properties were designed by the architectural firm of Earle & Fisher, including 96 Sagamore Road, a Colonial Revival house built in 1902, and 11 Monadnock Road, an 1899 Queen Anne Victorian executed in brick and stucco. Earle & Fisher were also responsible for the additions and modifications to the 1851 Whitman house.

Some houses in the district were occupied by wealthy and high-profile individuals in the city. Harold Ashley, vice president of a sprinkler manufacturer, lived at 14 Whitman Road, a 1920 Eclectic house. Frederick Lines, treasurer of the Matthews Manufacturing Company, lived in the 1918 Colonial Revival house at 24 Whitman Road, and mathematician and WPI professor Levi Conant lived at 254 Salisbury Street.

The district was listed on the National Register of Historic Places in 1980.

== See also ==
- National Register of Historic Places listings in northwestern Worcester, Massachusetts
- National Register of Historic Places listings in Worcester County, Massachusetts
