= Hammond Heights =

- U.S. National Register of Historic Places
- U.S. Historic district
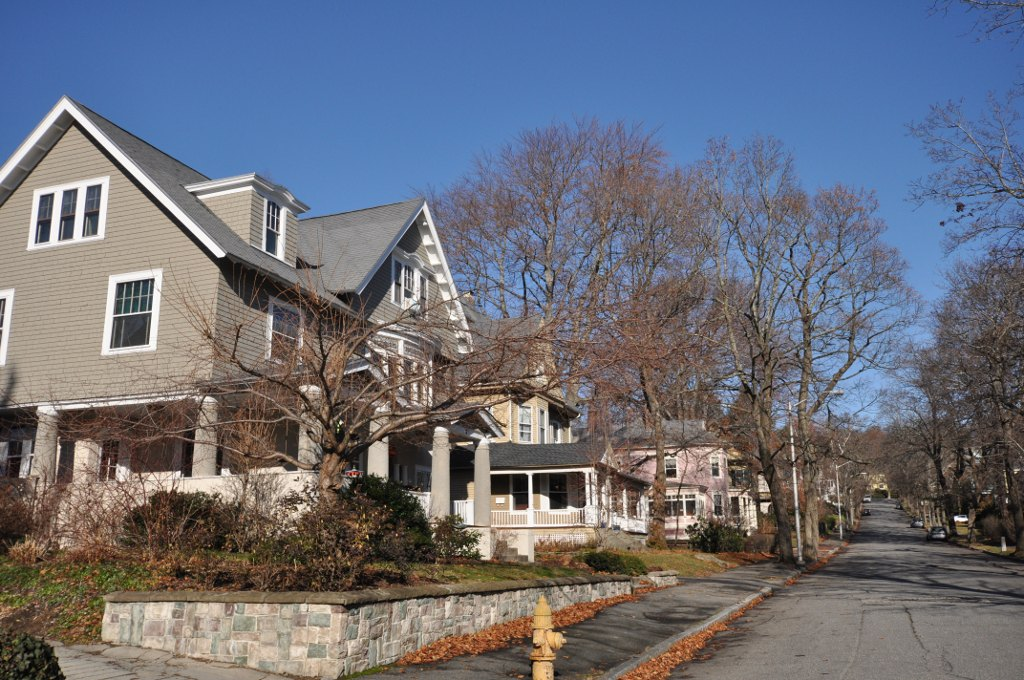
- View of Germain Street

- Location within Massachusetts Location within the United States
- Location: Properties along Germain, Haviland, Highland, and Westland Sts. and Institute Rd., Worcester, Massachusetts
- Coordinates: 42°16′21″N 71°49′3″W
- Built: 1851
- Architect: Multiple
- Architectural style: Colonial Revival, Italianate, Queen Anne
- MPS: Worcester MRA
- NRHP reference No.: 80000531
- Added to NRHP: March 05, 1980

Hammond Heights is an historic neighborhood subdivision on the west side of Worcester, Massachusetts. It includes properties along Germain, Haviland, Highland, and Westland Streets and Institute Road, most of which were built between 1890 and 1918, and is a good example of a turn-of-the-century residential subdivision, with a diversity of period architectural styles. The district was listed on the National Register of Historic Places in 1980.

== Description and history ==
Prior to 1890, the area that is now Hammond Heights was farmland, belonging to John Hammond, whose Italianate house (built in the 1850s) still stands on Highland Street. The farm was proposed for subdivision as early as 1886, and the area was completely built out between 1890 and 1928. Most of the houses in the neighborhood are wood-frame structures, many of which were designed by architects for their first owners. Stylistically, most of the houses are either Queen Anne or Colonial Revival, although there are some Craftsman-style and English Revival (Tudor) houses.

The first part of the area to be developed was Germain and Highland Streets. There are two particularly fine examples of Queen Anne architecture on Germain Street, one of which was featured in the catalog of architects Barker & Nourse. Good examples of Colonial Revival designs are found at 26 Haviland and 11 Westland Street. 28 Haviland Street is a distinctive and unusual example of Arts and Crafts architecture with touches of the Prairie School.

== See also ==
- National Register of Historic Places listings in northwestern Worcester, Massachusetts
- National Register of Historic Places listings in Worcester County, Massachusetts
