= Elm Street Historic District =

Elm Street Historic District may refer to:

- Elm Street Historic District (Hartford, Connecticut)
- Elm Street Historic District (Hatfield, Massachusetts)
- Elm Street Historic District (New Haven, Connecticut), a state and/or local historic district in New Haven, Connecticut
- Elm Street Historic District (Northampton, Massachusetts), a local historic district in the city of Northampton, Massachusetts
- Elm Street Historic District (Rocky Hill, Connecticut), listed on the National Register of Historic Places in Hartford County, Connecticut
- Elm Street Historic District (Worcester, Massachusetts)

== See also ==
- Elm Street (disambiguation)
