= A Nightmare on Elm Street (disambiguation) =

A Nightmare on Elm Street is a 1984 horror film.

A Nightmare on Elm Street may also refer to:

- A Nightmare on Elm Street (franchise), a media franchise begun with the film
- A Nightmare on Elm Street (comics), several comics series based on the films
- A Nightmare on Elm Street (video game), 1989, based on the films
- A Nightmare on Elm Street (2010 film), a remake of the original film
- Freddy's Nightmares: A Nightmare on Elm Street: The Series, a television series that aired from 1988 to 1990

== See also ==
- Elm Street (disambiguation)
- List of A Nightmare on Elm Street media
- A Wet Dream on Elm Street, a 2010 pornographic film
