= John C. Hammond =

American lawyer (1842–1926)

John Chester Hammond
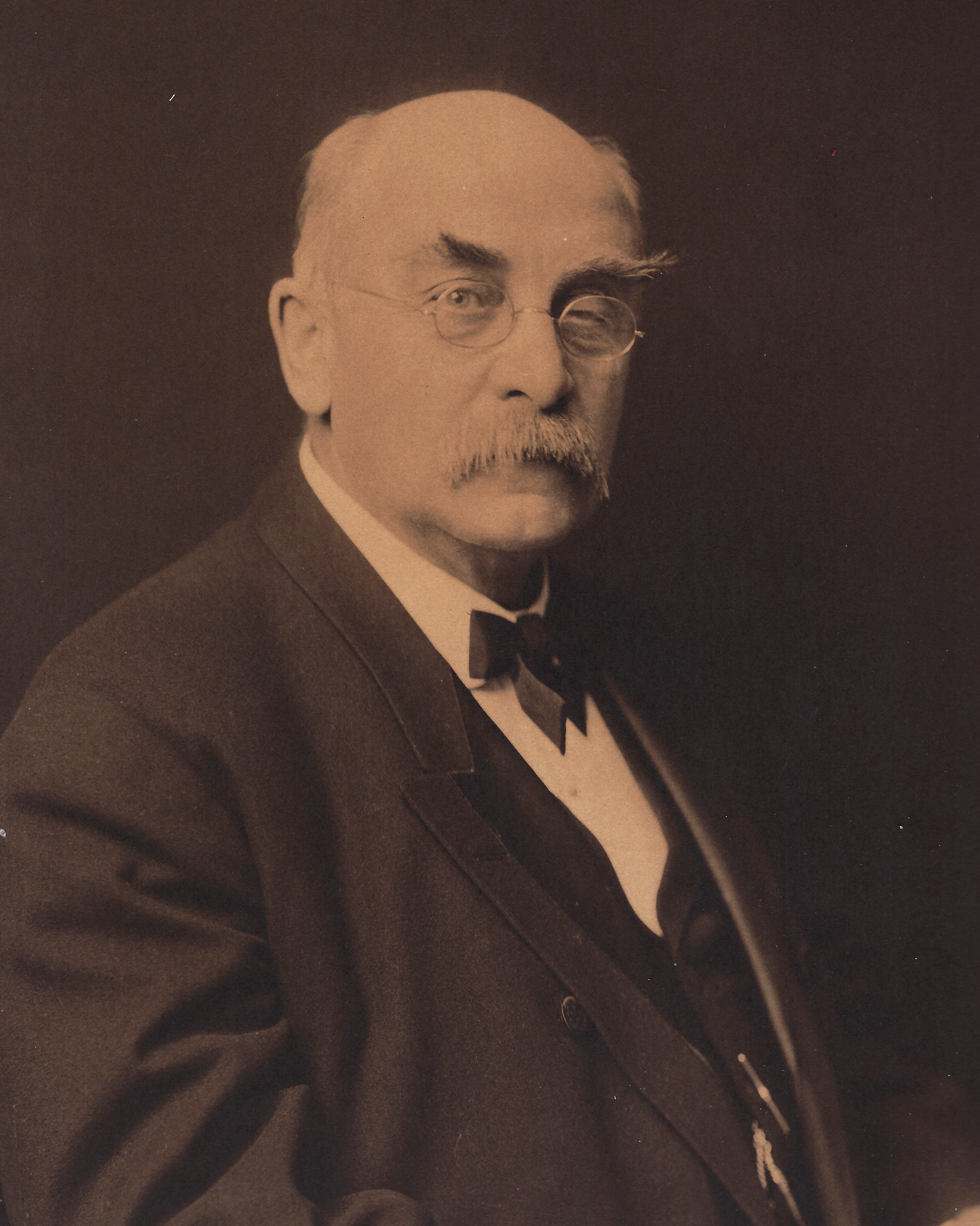
- Born: August 15, 1842; Amherst, Massachusetts, U.S.
- Died: April 21, 1926 (aged 83); Northampton, Massachusetts, U.S.
- Education: Amherst College
- Occupations: Lawyer; Northwestern District Attorney, Commonwealth of Massachusetts
- Years active: 1868–1918
- Spouse: Eliza Brown (1842-1896)

Signature
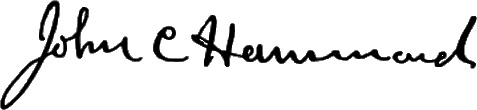

John Chester Hammond (August 15, 1842 – April 21, 1926) was a Northampton, Massachusetts, lawyer and later Northwestern District Attorney of the Commonwealth of Massachusetts. He employed recent Amherst College graduate (and later US President) Calvin Coolidge in his firm Hammond & Field in 1895.

== Biography ==
John C. Hammond was born in Amherst, Massachusetts on August 15, 1842.

Coolidge said of Hammond in his 1929 autobiography, "He was a lawyer of great learning and wide business experience, with a remarkable ability in the preparation of pleadings and an insight that soon brought him to the crucial point of a case. He was massive and strong rather than elegant, and placed great stress on accuracy. He presented a cause in court with ability and skill."

Hammond had served as President of Massachusetts Bar in 1913, and was Dean of the Hampshire County Bar for several years prior. He died in the shingle-style Queen Anne home he had built in 1891, located in the now-named Elm Street Historic District of Northampton, Massachusetts.

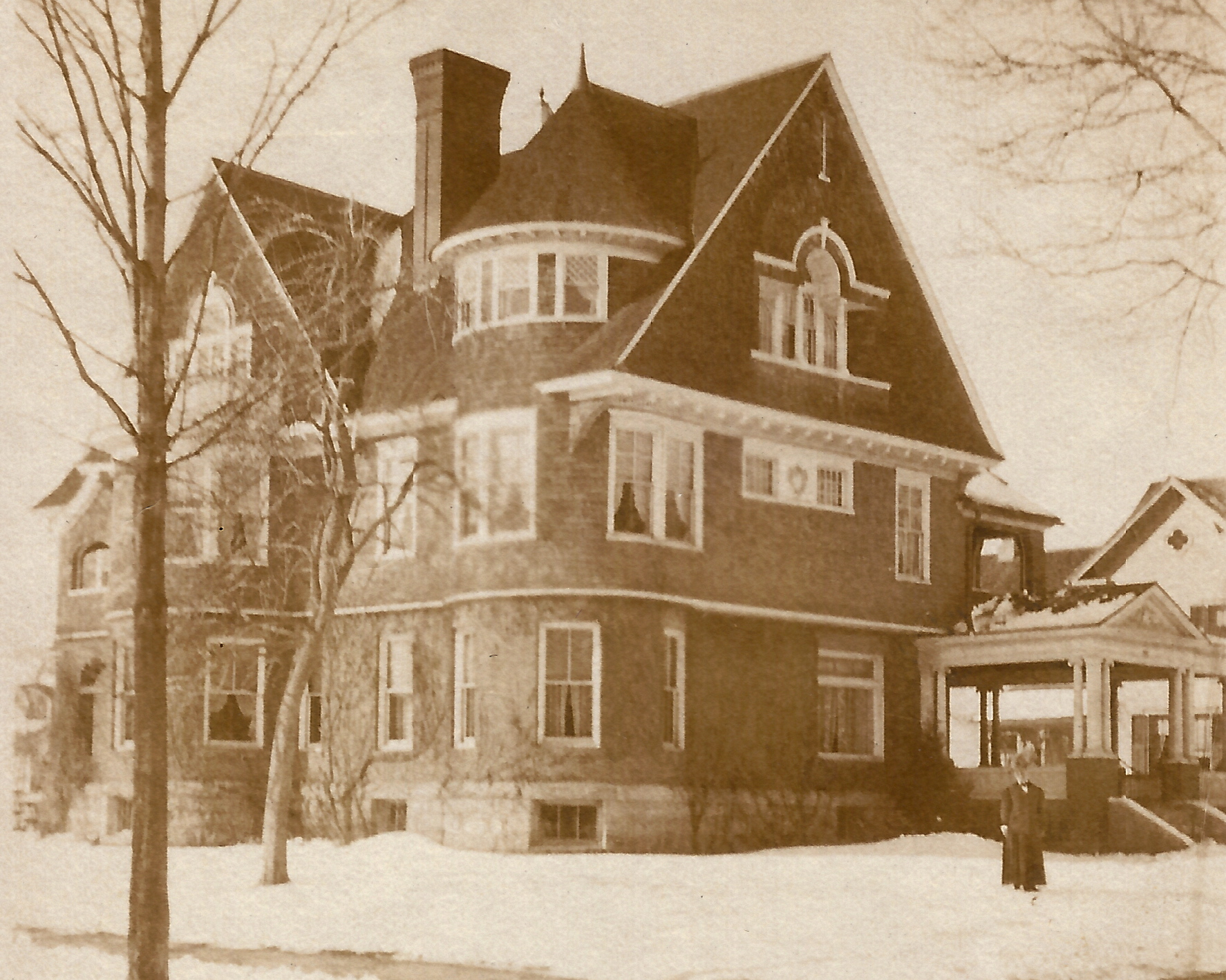
222 Elm Street, Queen Anne style home of John C. Hammond built 1891

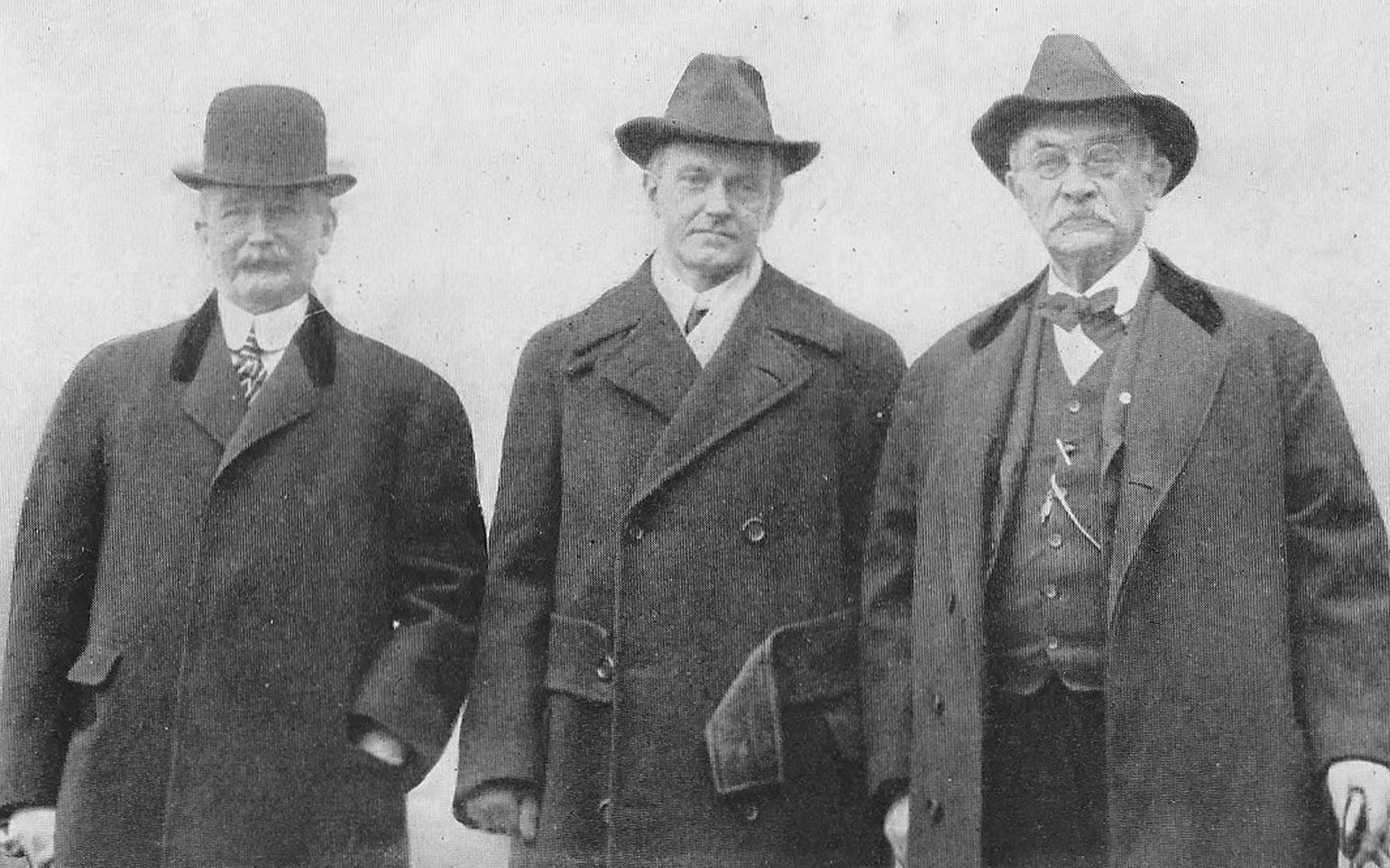
From left to right: Henry P. Field, Calvin Coolidge, John C. Hammond at Amherst College reunion
