= Elm Street =

Elm Street may refer to:

- Elm Street station, railway station in Norristown, Pennsylvania
- Elm Street (Yarmouth, Maine)
- "Elm St.", a 2001 by Ryan Cabrera
- "Elm Street", a 2001 album by Lanterna
- "Elm Street", a 2016 song by Jimmy Wopo

== See also ==
- A Nightmare on Elm Street (disambiguation)
- Elm Street Historic District (disambiguation)
