= Elm Street Historic District (Worcester, Massachusetts) =

Historic district in Massachusetts, United States

- U.S. National Register of Historic Places
- U.S. Historic district
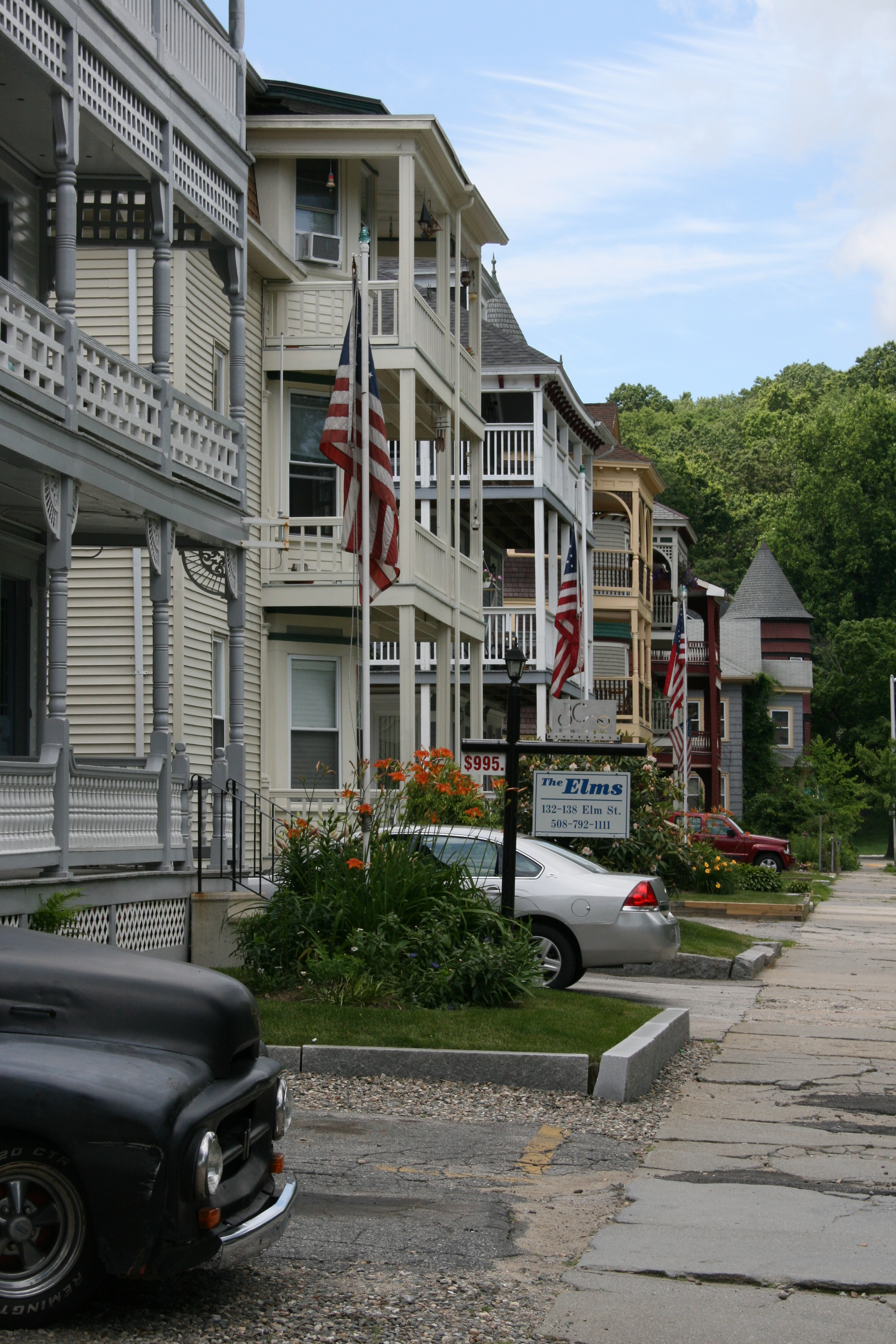

- Location within Massachusetts Location within the United States
- Location: 132–148 Elm St., Worcester, Massachusetts
- Coordinates: 42°15′57″N 71°49′2″W
- Area: 1.5 acres (0.61 ha)
- Built: 1904
- Architectural style: Second Empire, Stick/Eastlake, Queen Anne
- MPS: Worcester Three-Deckers TR
- NRHP reference No.: 89002374
- Added to NRHP: February 9, 1990

The Elm Street Historic District encompasses a collection of high-style Queen Anne Victorian three-decker houses in Worcester, Massachusetts. Normally a building style intended for occupation by the working classes of the city, these stylish buildings were built 1904–06 facing Elm Park on the fashionable west side, and attracted a higher class of occupant. The district was listed on the National Register of Historic Places in 1990.

== Description and history ==
For most of the 19th century, Worcester's west side was the preferred neighborhood for the city's fashionable and upper-class residents. With the development of the trolley network into the area, it became a target for higher-end multiunit housing. Charles Bowker, a local real estate developer, built a series of five three-deckers in 1904-06 as rental properties on the south side of Elm Street, facing Elm Park to the north. Members of the Bowker family occupied one of the buildings, while the others were rented to mainly white collar workers, including real estate agents, bookkeepers, and accountants. Other developers also built similar houses along the same block.

The historic district extends for most of a city block, extending along the south side of Elm Street between Hudson and Russell Streets. The nine buildings in the district are of wood frame construction, and follow the typical forms of three-deckers elsewhere in the city, albeit on a more generously sized scale. Front porches on several of the buildings extend across the entire front, and some wrap around to one side; several of these retain original elaborate balustrades. Two nearly identical buildings near the western end of the district feature project semicircular corner bays with conical turrets.

== See also ==
- National Register of Historic Places listings in northwestern Worcester, Massachusetts
- National Register of Historic Places listings in Worcester County, Massachusetts
