= Elm Street Historic District (Northampton, Massachusetts) =

Elm Street Historic District Northampton, Massachusetts
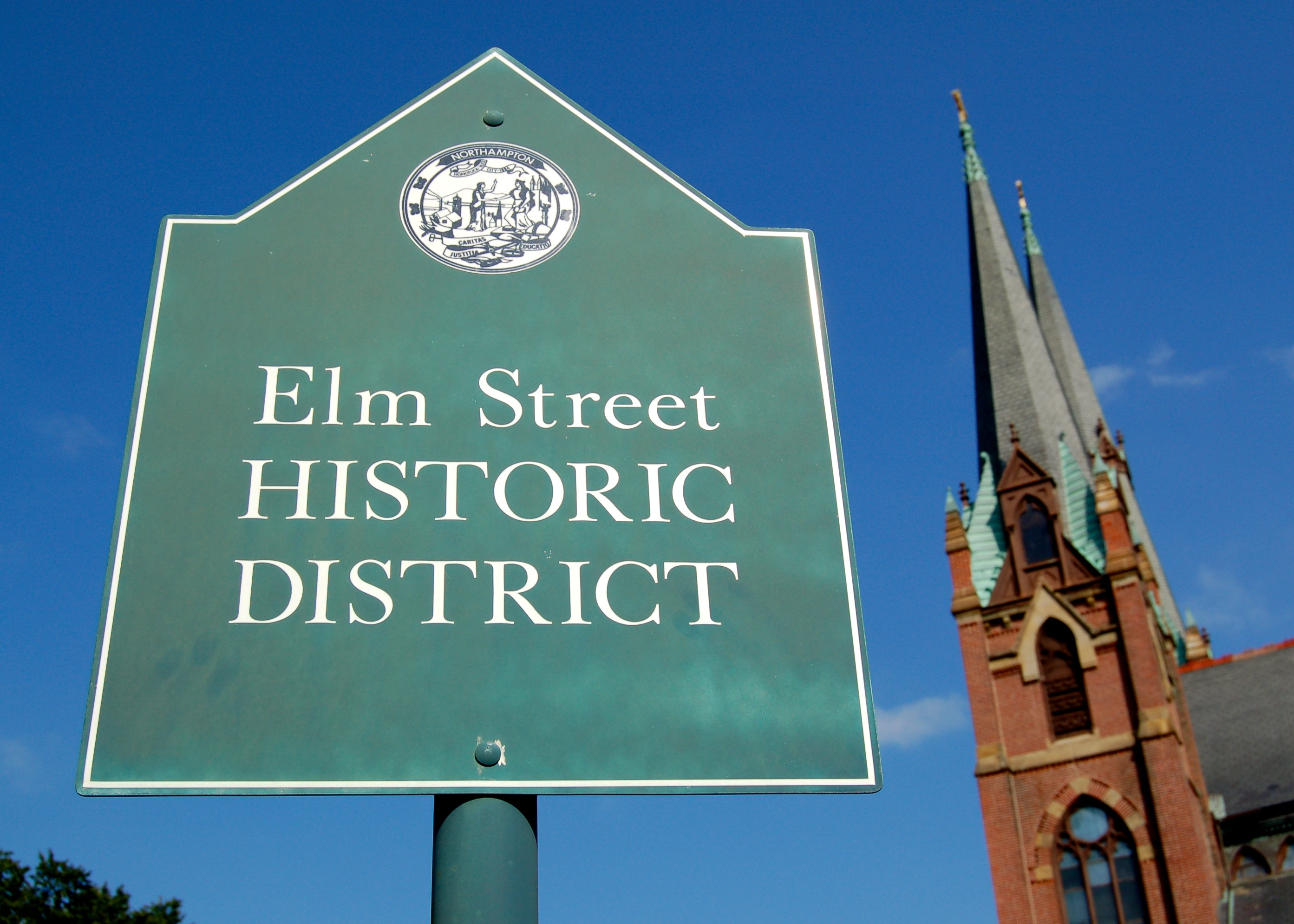
- Shown above: commencement of Elm Street Historic District, Northampton, Massachusetts with St. Mary's Catholic Church in background.
- Interactive map of Elm Street Historic District Northampton, Massachusetts
- 42°19′13″N 72°38′28″W
- Location: Northampton, Massachusetts
- Nearest city: Northampton, Massachusetts

History
- Established: 1994

Site notes
- Area: 139 buildings on 78 acres along one mile of Elm Street and Round Hill Road.
- Architectural styles: 18th century colonial, Second Empire, Queen Anne, Italianate, Colonial revival, Modern.

The Elm Street/Round Hill Historic District is a local historic district in the city of Northampton, Massachusetts. Established in 1994 along one mile of Elm Street it was expanded to include Round Hill Road in 2012.

There are 139 buildings ranging in style from early 18th century colonial to Modern and International style.

The first lots on what is now Elm Street (from Main Street to Round Hill) were granted between 1659 and 1661.

The founding of Clarke School for the Deaf in 1867 and the founding of Smith College in 1871 marked the beginning of a significant number of institutional buildings in a wide range of architectural styles at the eastern end of the district (Smith College) and Round Hill Road (Clarke Schools). There was a boom in residential home building from the mid-19th to early 20th century and as a result many homes are Queen Anne and Colonial Revival style. In 2013 the Clarke Schools sold 12 acres with ten buildings to a developer who will create luxury condominiums and commercial space.

Catholic churches punctuate each end of the district.

Elm Street is part of Massachusetts Route 9 which runs East/West between Pittsfield, Massachusetts and Boston, Massachusetts.

== Notable buildings and locations ==
The eastern terminus of the Elm Street Historic District is dominated by Smith College's College Hall on the south side built in 1875 in Gothic Italianate style by Peabody and Stearns and by the former St. Mary's Catholic Church built on the north side in 1881 in Gothic Revival. The Church and its Rectory are on the site of the former Mansion House, an important stop at the northern terminus of the Northampton-New Haven Canal.

Two houses vie for the claim of "oldest house." Smith College's Sessions House at 109 Elm Street is wood-framed and has a gambrel roof. It is believed to have been built around 1725 by Jonathan Hunt and would therefore be the oldest building owned by Smith College. The privately owned 197 Elm Street is believed to have been built around the same time (1730) but given approximations on construction dates it might be either the oldest or second-oldest, extant building on Elm Street. By contrast, Smith College's Cutter and Ziskind Houses were designed by Skidmore, Owings & Merrill and built in 1957 in the International style and the Contemporary-style Art Museum and Campus Center were built in 2003.

Smith College's Haven House at 110 Elm Street (sometimes shown as 96 Elm Street) was the residence of Sylvia Plath during her first two years at Smith College from 1950 to 1952.

At 137 Elm Street is the 1841 Italianate home of Charles P. Huntington, a noted abolitionist and namesake for the nearby town of Huntington which he helped create. He was a member of the State House of Representatives in Boston.

At 222 Elm Street is the 1891 Shingle-style Queen Anne home of John C Hammond who took Amherst College graduate (later US president) Calvin Coolidge on as a legal apprentice in his law firm Hammond & Field.

Also near the western terminus, just off Elm Street is the former home of President Calvin Coolidge on Massasoit Street.

The western terminus of the District is Catholic Church built in 1899 for the Blessed Sacrament Parish in an unusual "Swiss" design.

Definition of architectural style below as identified by the Elm Street Historic Commission.

== Georgian and Federal Styles ==
There are seven, remaining homes from the 18th and early 19th century that make up the oldest buildings on the street.

They include four homes owned by Smith College: 41 Elm Street is known as Duckett House built c. 1810 in Federal style but since altered with porches and ornamentation; 45 Elm Street now known as Chase House, formerly the Mary Burnham School for Girls originally built c. 1810 in Federal style it went through a distinctly French Second Empire renovation but today has had the classic cupola removed; 84 Elm Street, the Benjamin Lyman House now known as Drew Hall built c. 1750 in yellow-brick, Georgian style; 109 Elm Street, the Jonathan Hunt House now known as Sessions House built c. 1725, Georgian style. And three privately owned homes: 153 Elm Street, the Timothy Jewett House built 1786 in Federal style; 197 Elm Street, the Ebenezer Clark House built 1730 in Georgian style and 206 Elm Street, the Aaron Breck House built 1820 in Georgian style.

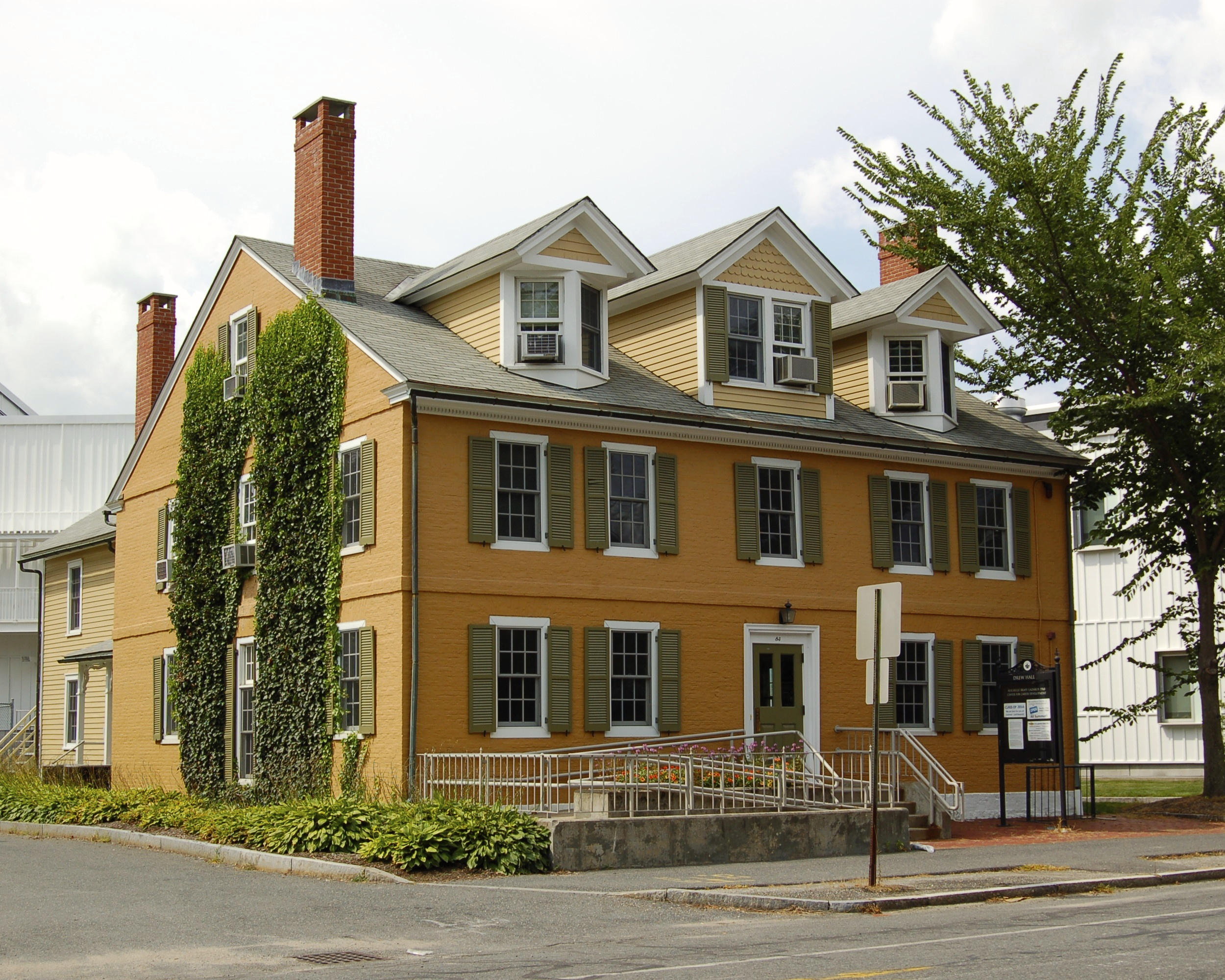
84 Elm Street, Northampton, MA. Built c. 1750. Georgian style.

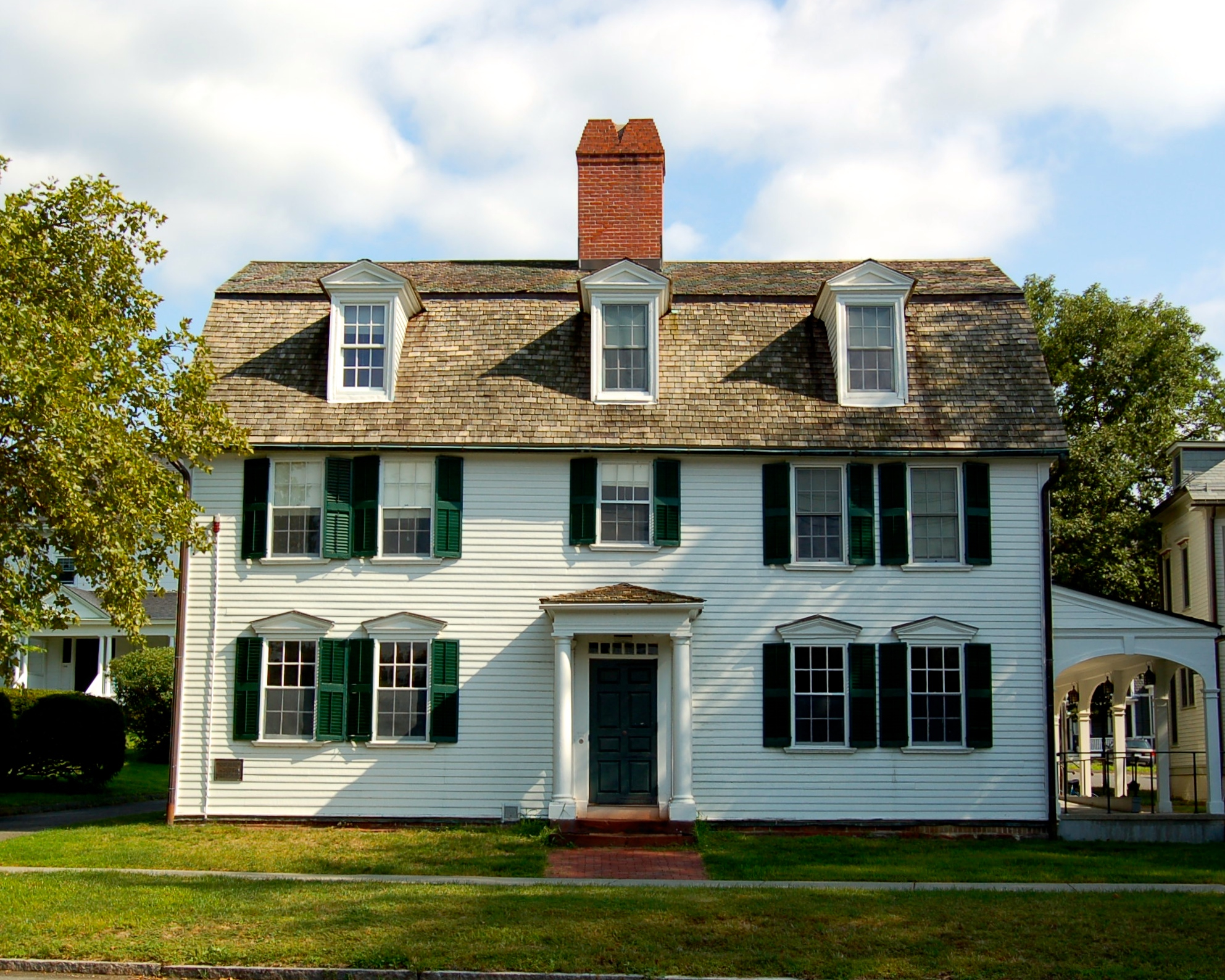
109 Elm Street, Northampton, MA. Built c. 1725. Georgian style.

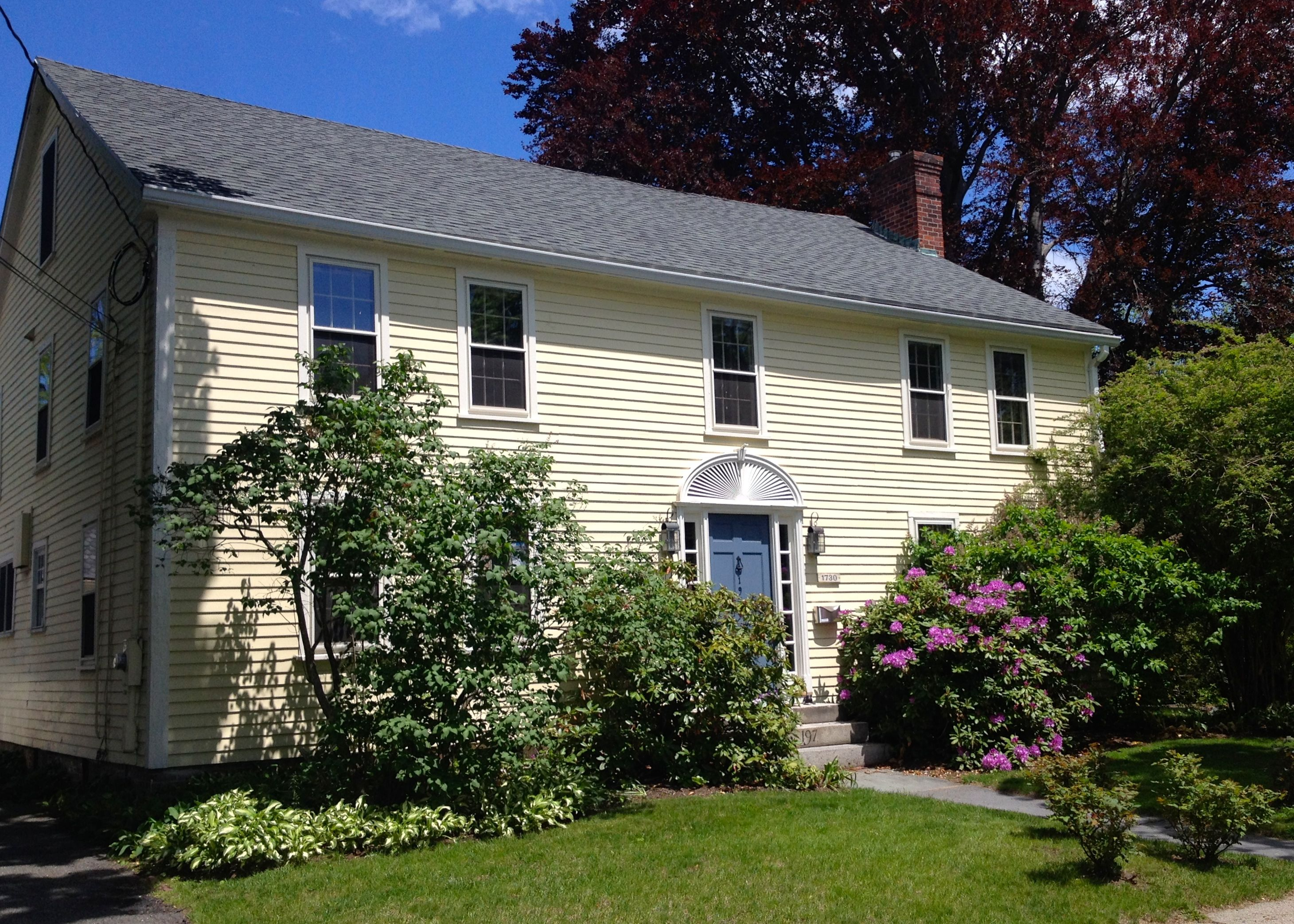
197 Elm Street, Northampton, MA. Built c. 1730. Georgian style.

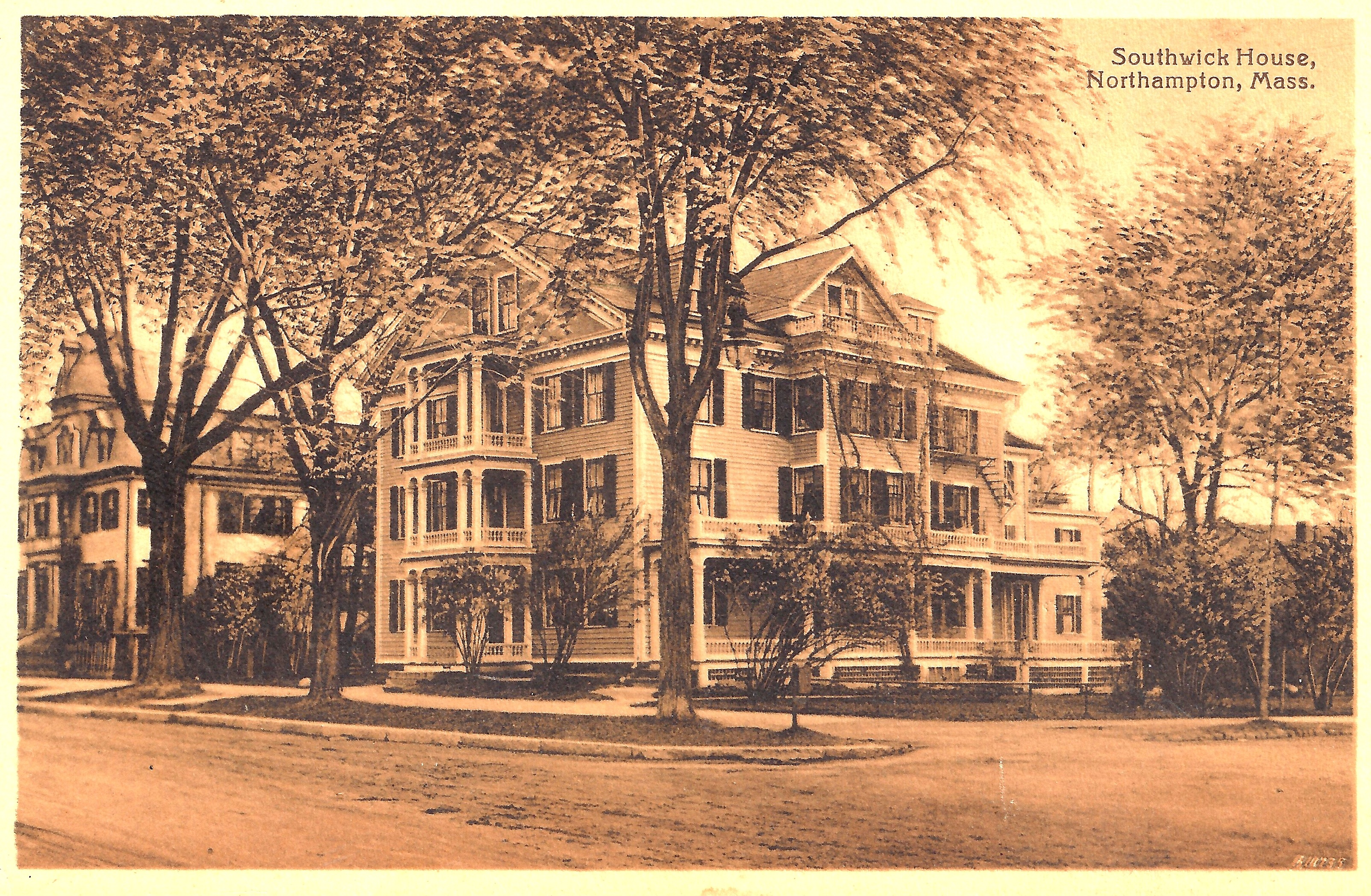
41 Elm Street, Northampton, MA. 1900 photo shows addition of Victorian-era porches. Originally built c. 1810. Federal style.

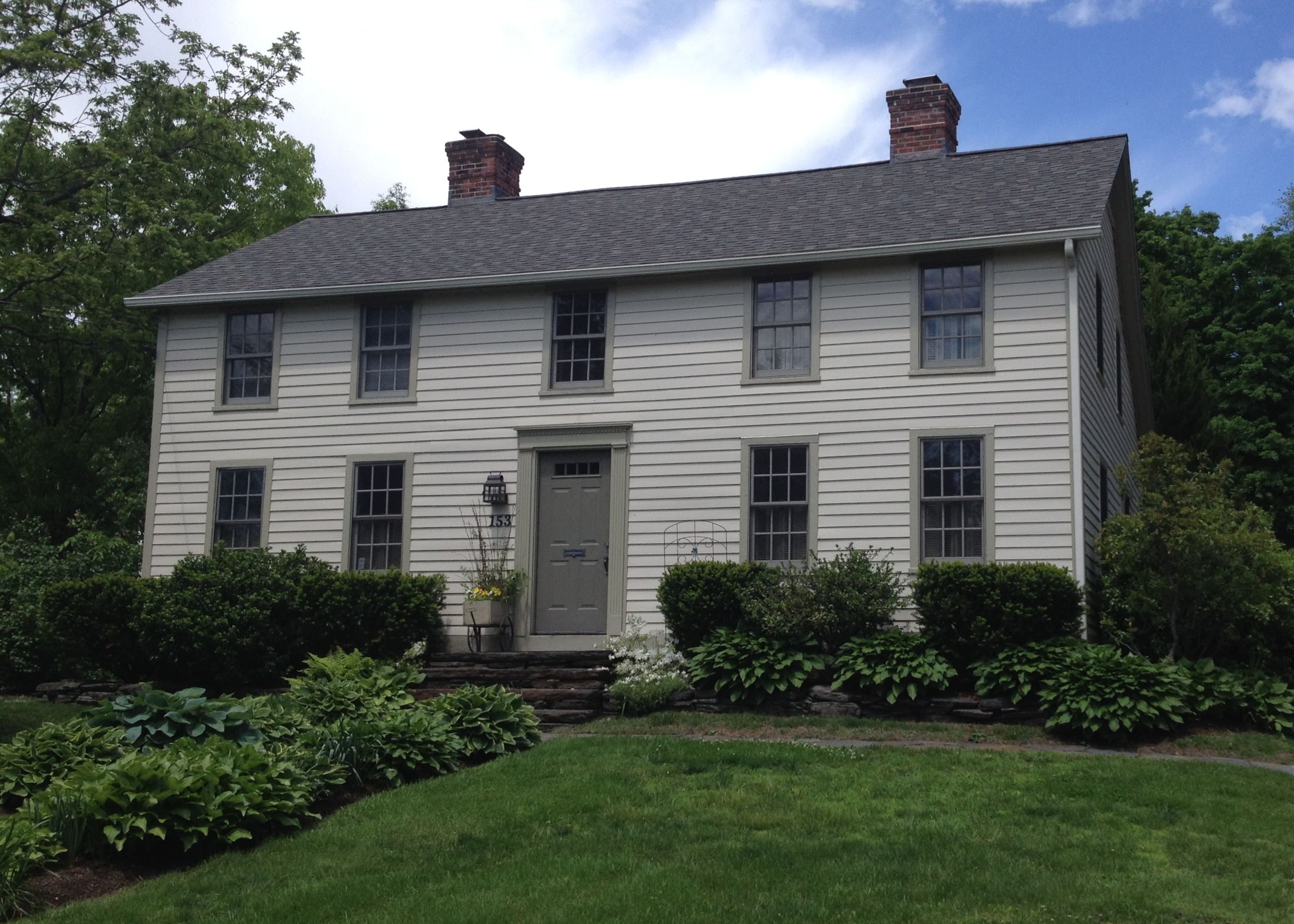
153 Elm Street, Northampton, MA. Built c. 1820. Federal style.

== Queen Anne and Stick ==
There are many examples of Queen Anne style architecture including: 76 Elm Street, 149 Elm Street, 222 Elm Street, 225 Elm Street, 229 Elm Street, 231 Elm Street, 240 Elm Street, 275 Elm Street, 292 Elm Street, 293 Elm Street, 296 Elm Street, 300 Elm Street, 320 Elm Street. Panel Brick: 211 Elm Street and 275 Elm Street.

222 Elm Street was built 1891 in Queen Anne Shingle style by Judge John C Hammond (1842–1926), who took Amherst College graduate (later US president) Calvin Coolidge on as a legal apprentice in his law firm Hammond & Field.

225 Elm Street built by Elbridge G. and Mary Brewster Southwick in 1907. Elbridge Southwick owned and developed Bedford Terrace (now largely Smith College) in the 1890s and the office block known as Central Chambers on Center Street, Northampton.

Stick style examples include: 138 Elm Street, 146 Elm Street and 150 Street.

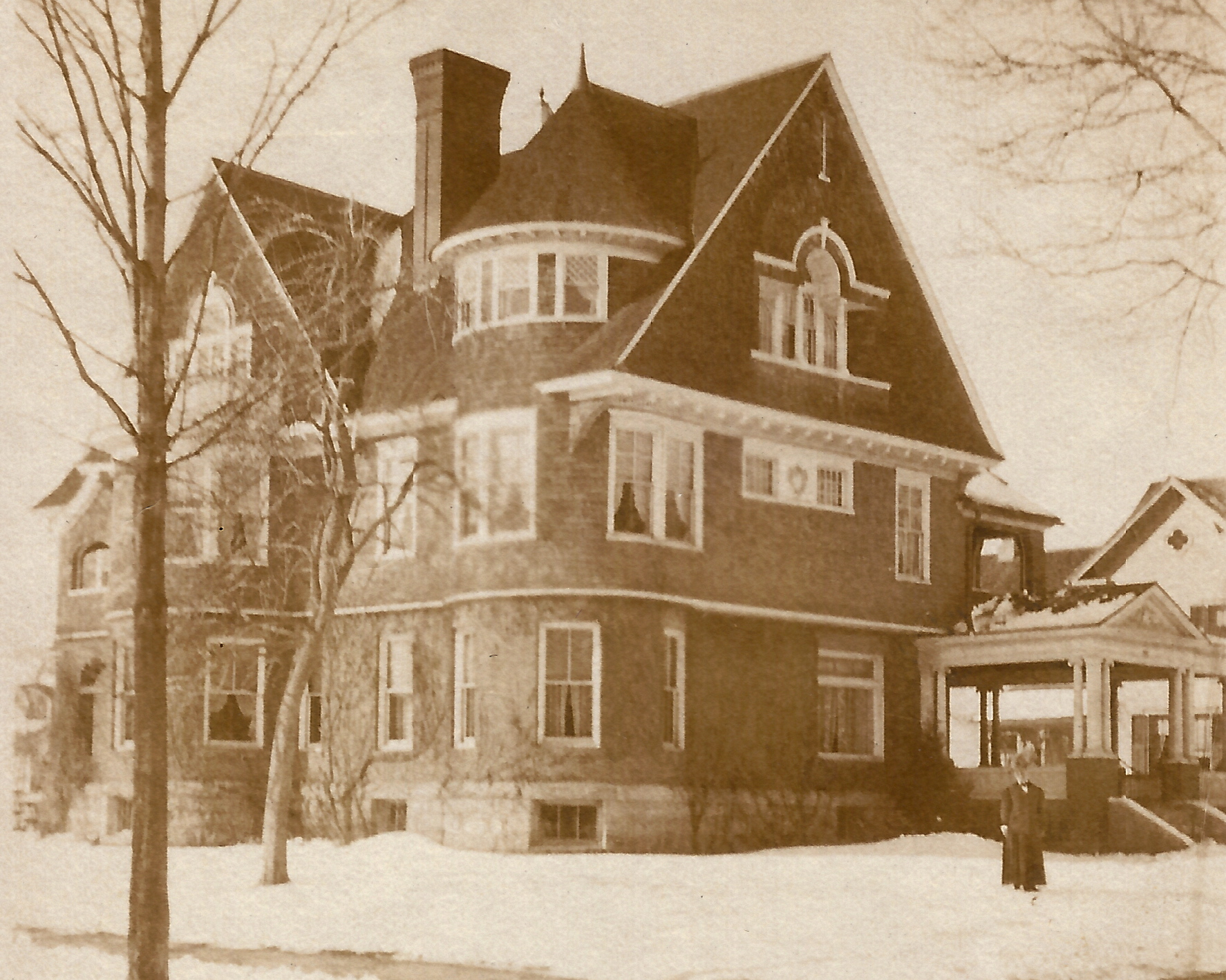
222 Elm Street, Northampton, MA. Built 1891. Queen Anne Shingle style.

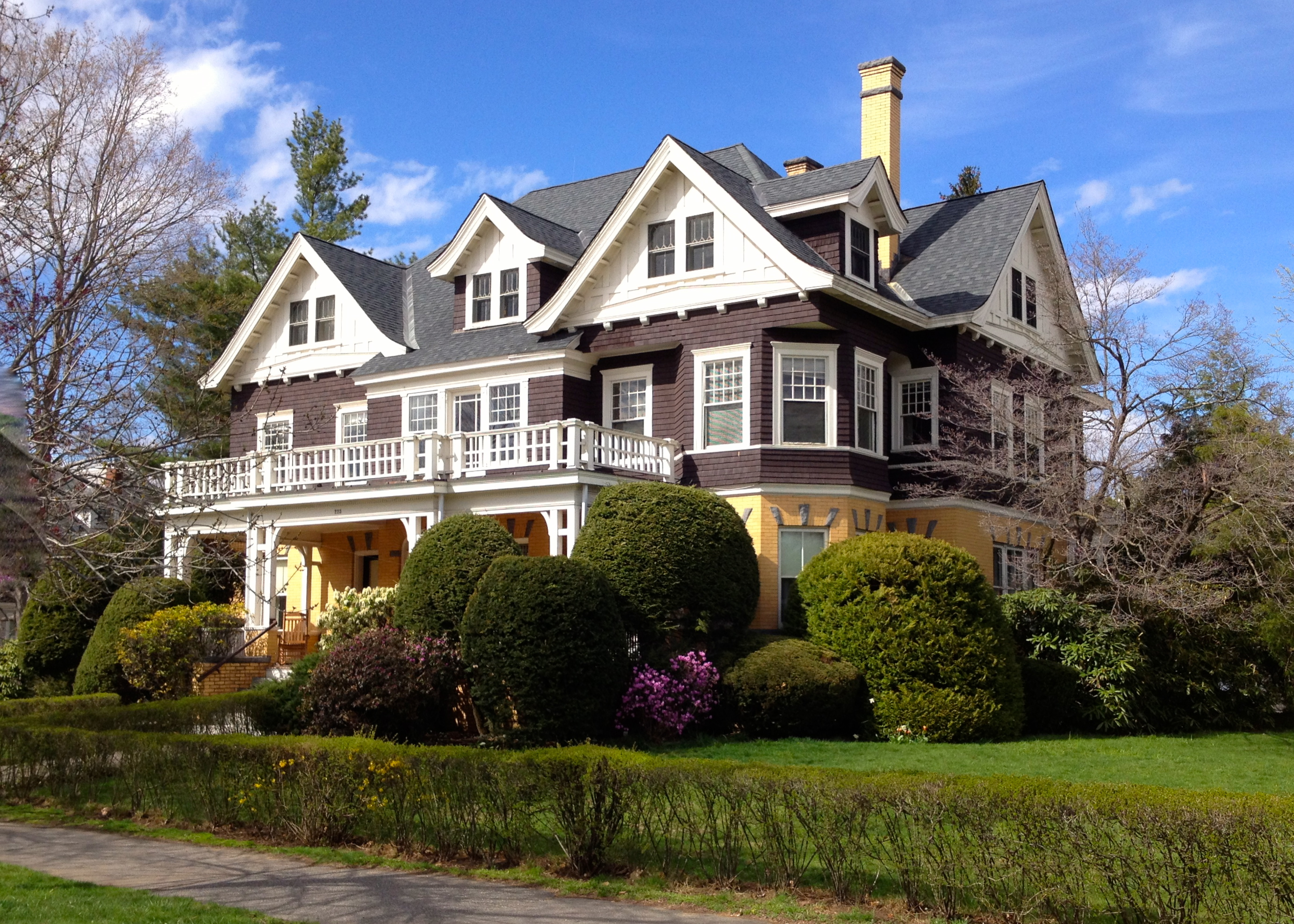
225 Elm Street, Northampton, MA. Built 1907. Queen Anne yellow brick and brown shingle.

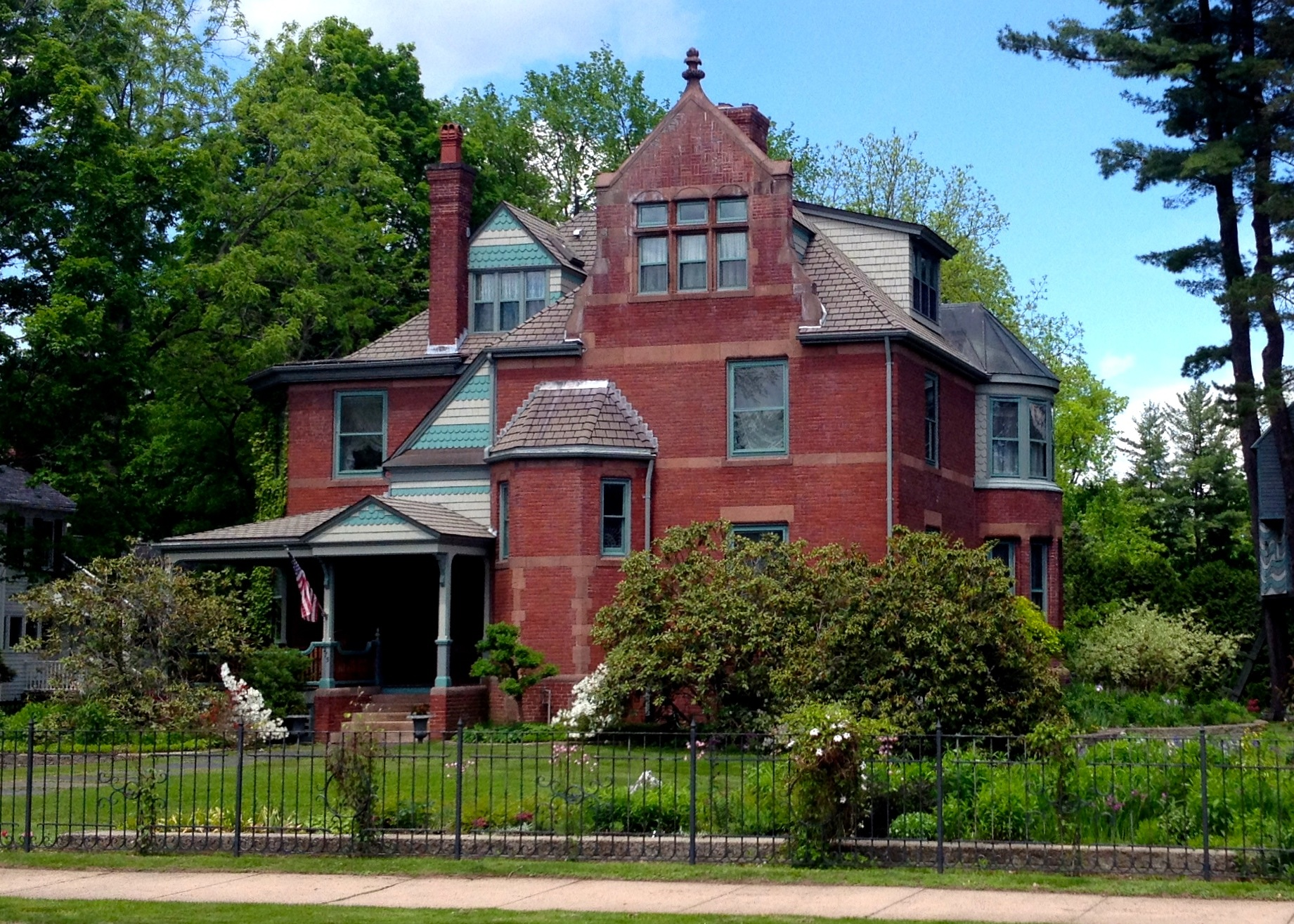
275 Elm Street, Northampton, MA. Queen Anne style rendered in red brick.

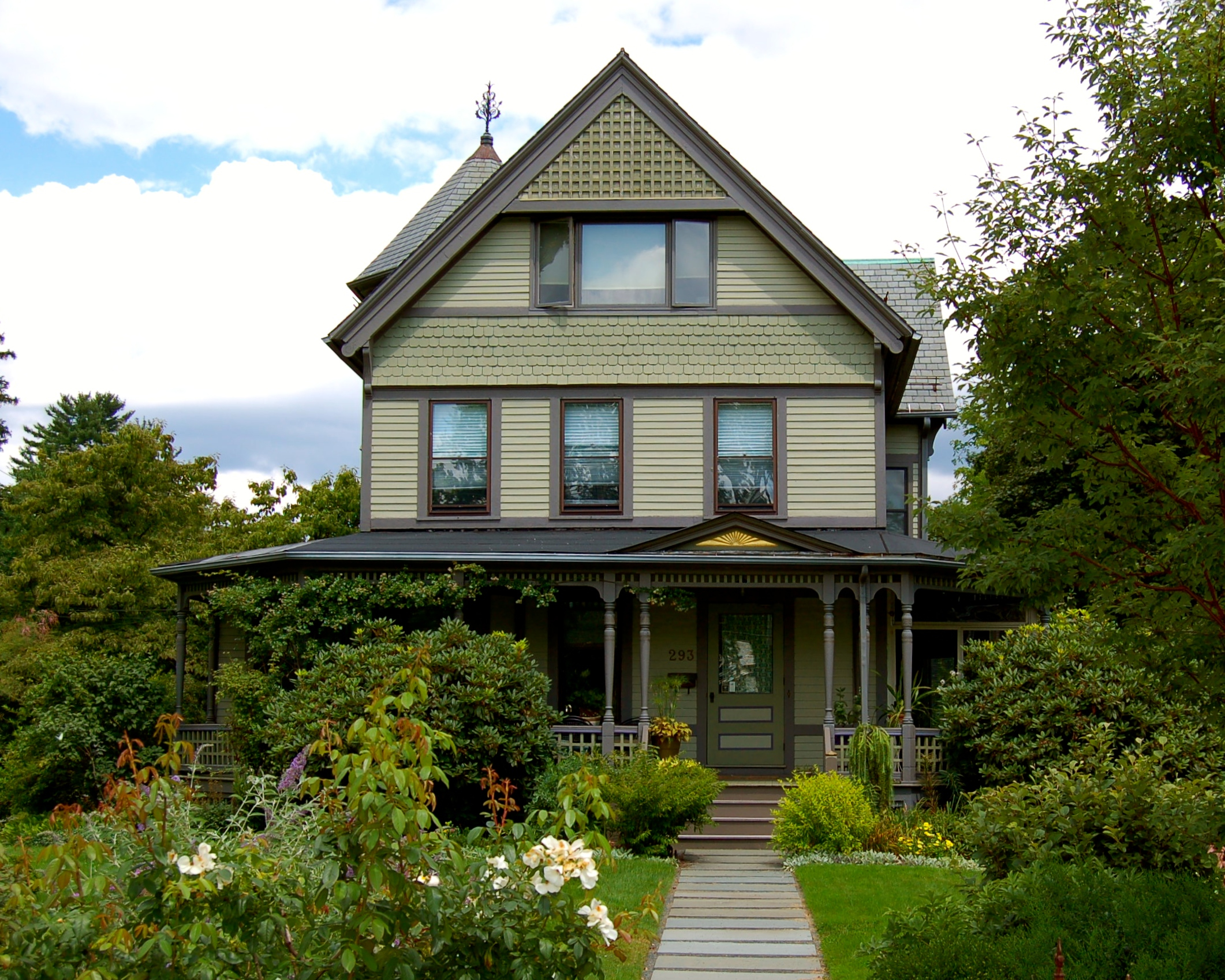
293 Elm Street, Northampton, MA. Queen Anne style rendered in painted clapboard.

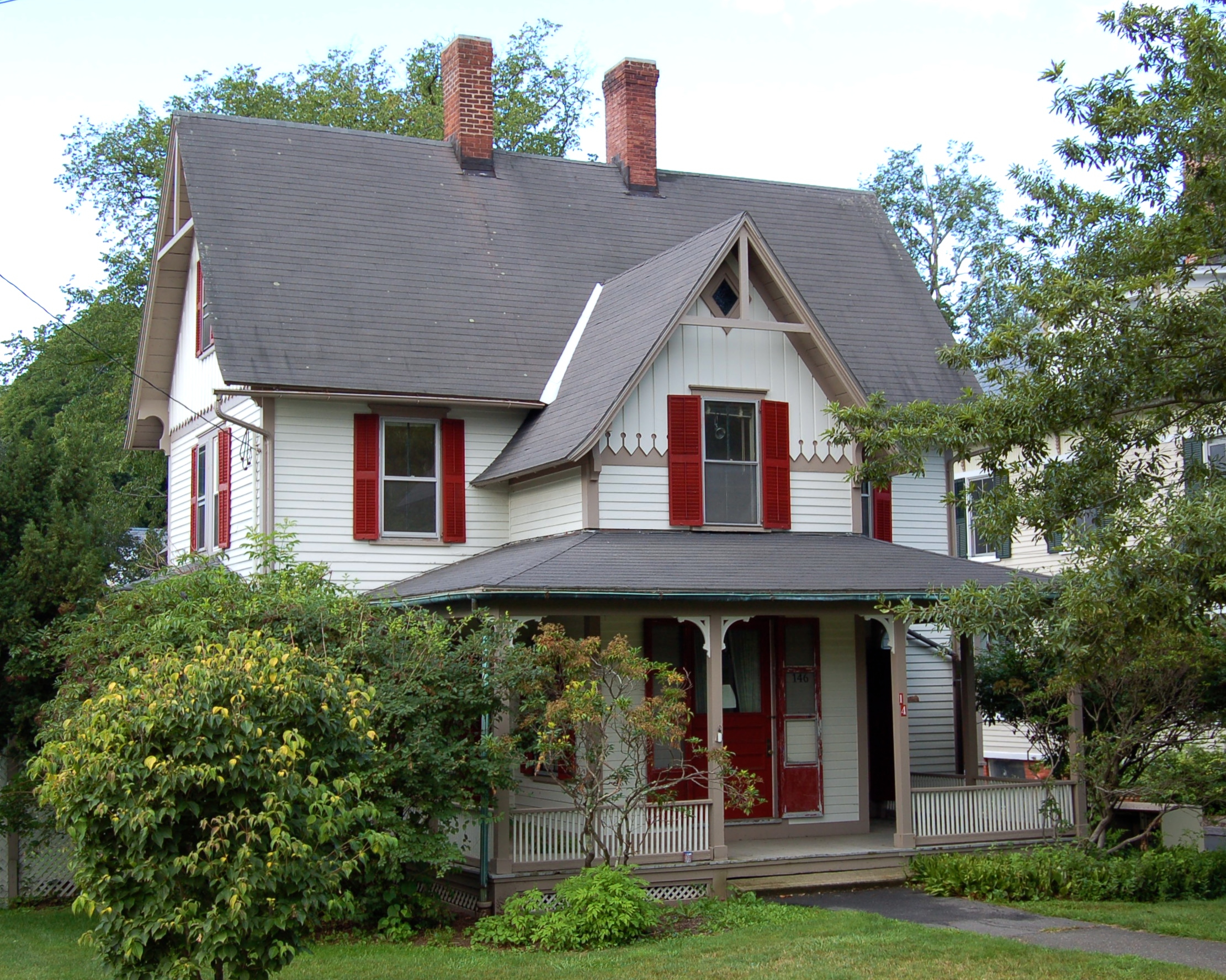
146 Elm Street, Northampton, MA. Built 1874. Stick style.

== Neo-Georgian and Colonial Revival ==
Example of Neo-Georgian is 47-49 Elm Street. Examples of Colonial Revival include: 115 Elm Street, 123 Elm Street, 169 Elm Street, 179 Elm Street, 186 Elm Street, 234 Elm Street, 259 Elm Street, 264 Elm Street, 276 Elm Street, 280 Elm Street, 281 Elm Street, 302 Elm Street, 330 Elm Street, 336 Elm Street, 337 Elm Street, 19 Round Hill Road, 22 Round Hill Road, 44 Round Hill Road, 48 Round Hill Road, 54 Round Hill Road, 84 Round Hill Road, 88 Round Hill Road, 91 Round Hill Road, 96 Round Hill Road.

123 Elm Street is known as Smith College's Helen Hills Hills Chapel.

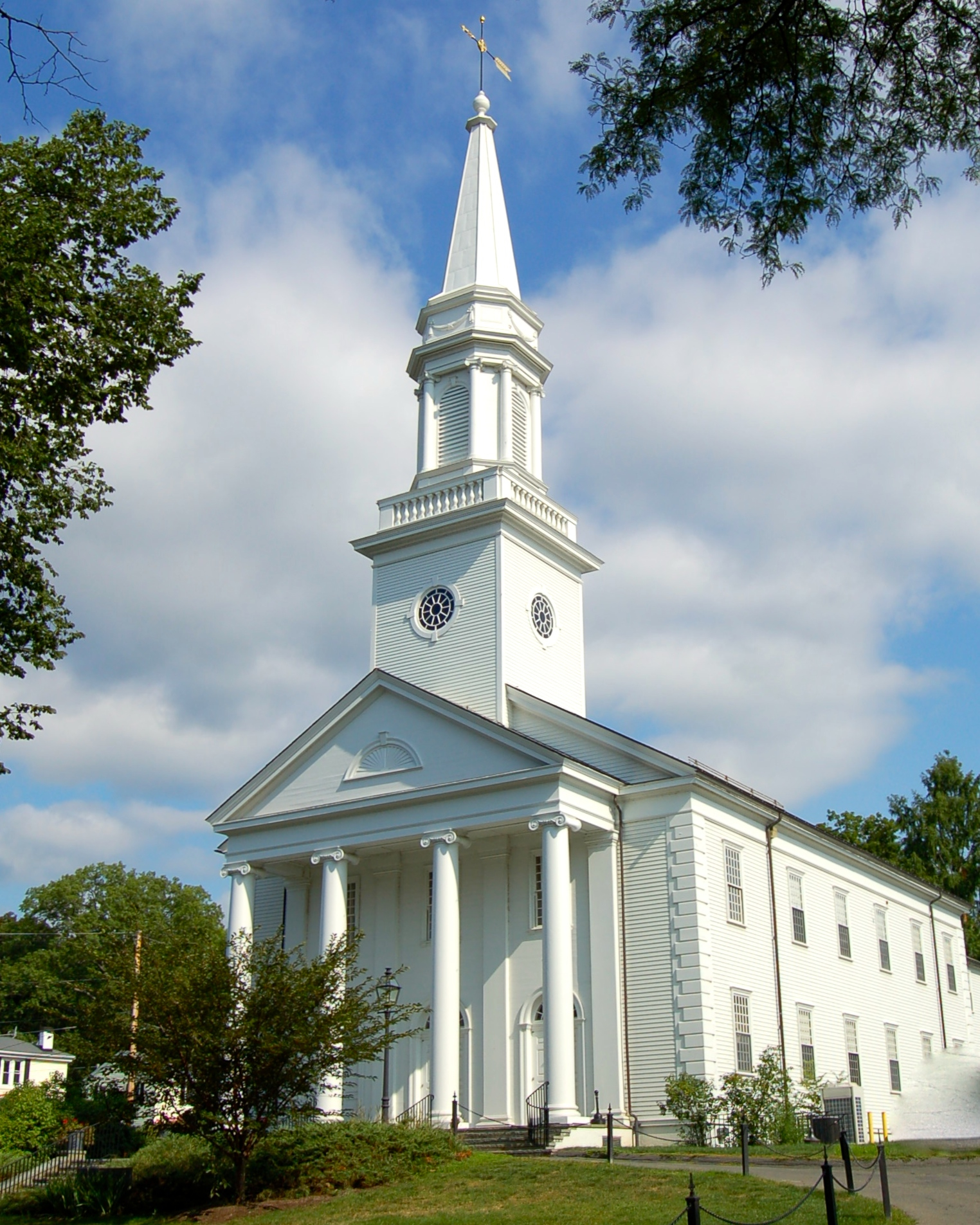
123 Elm Street, Northampton MA. Built 1955. Colonial Revival.

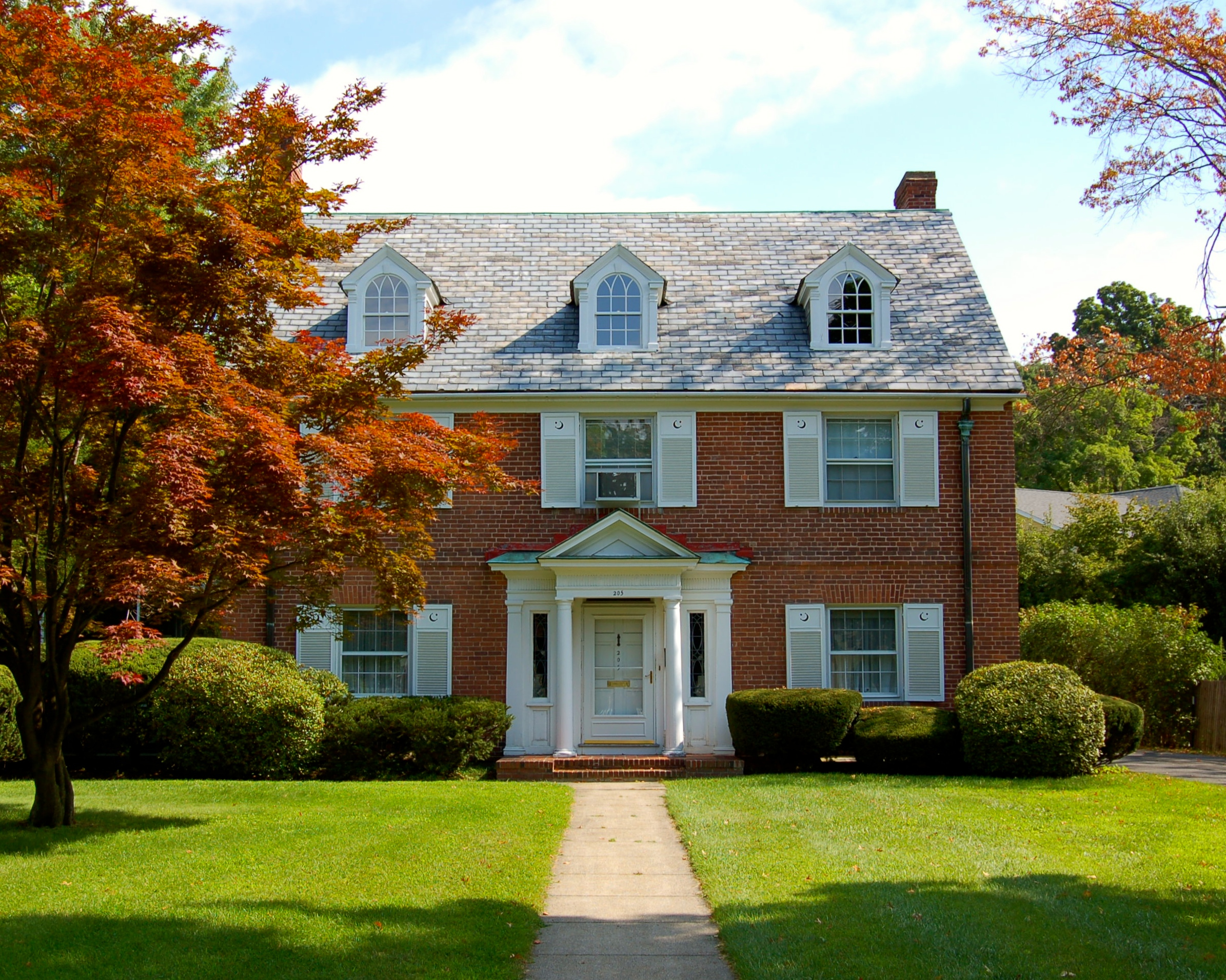
205 Elm Street, Northampton, MA. Built 1922. Colonial Revival.

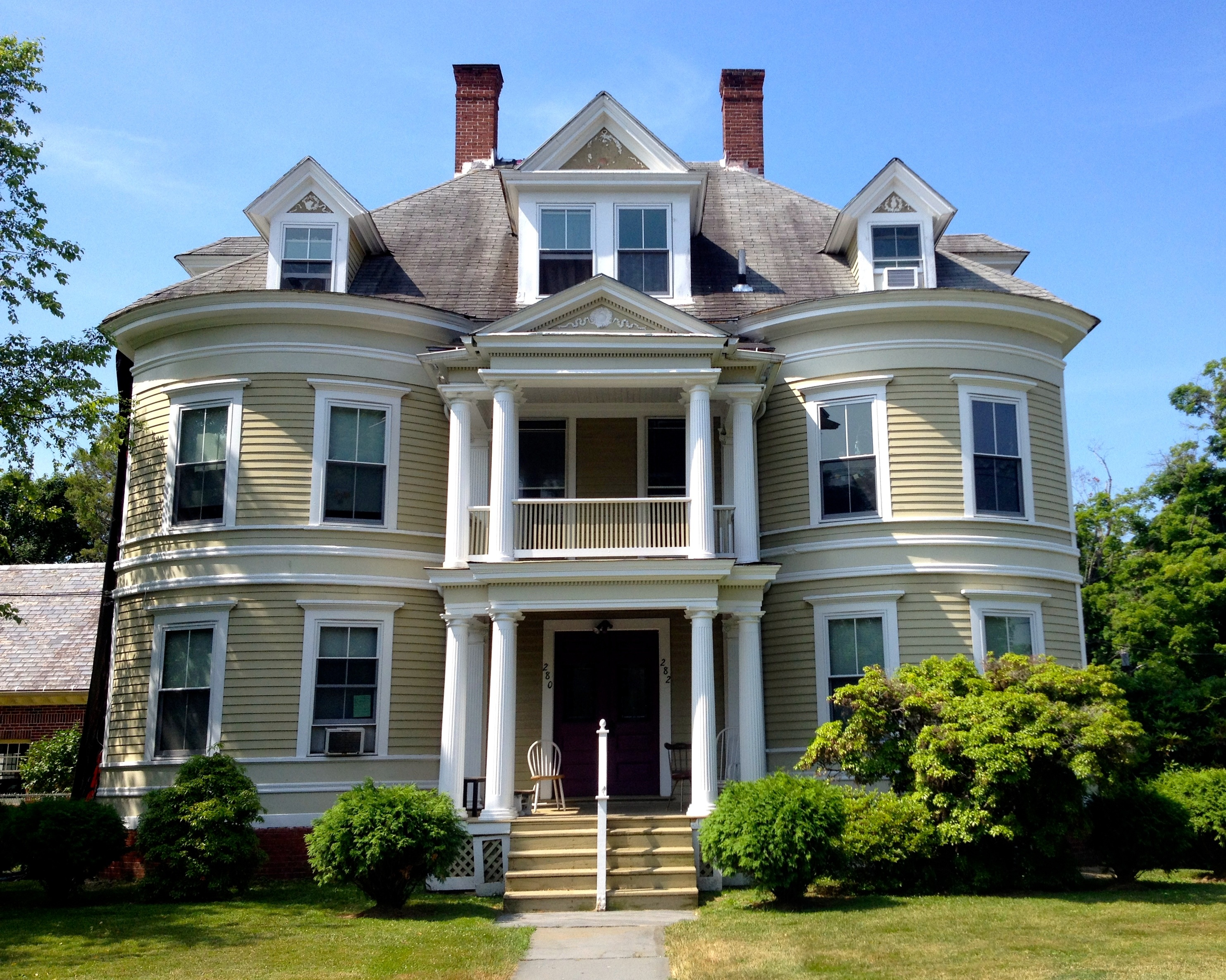
280 282 Elm Street, Northampton, MA. Built 1891. Colonial Revival.

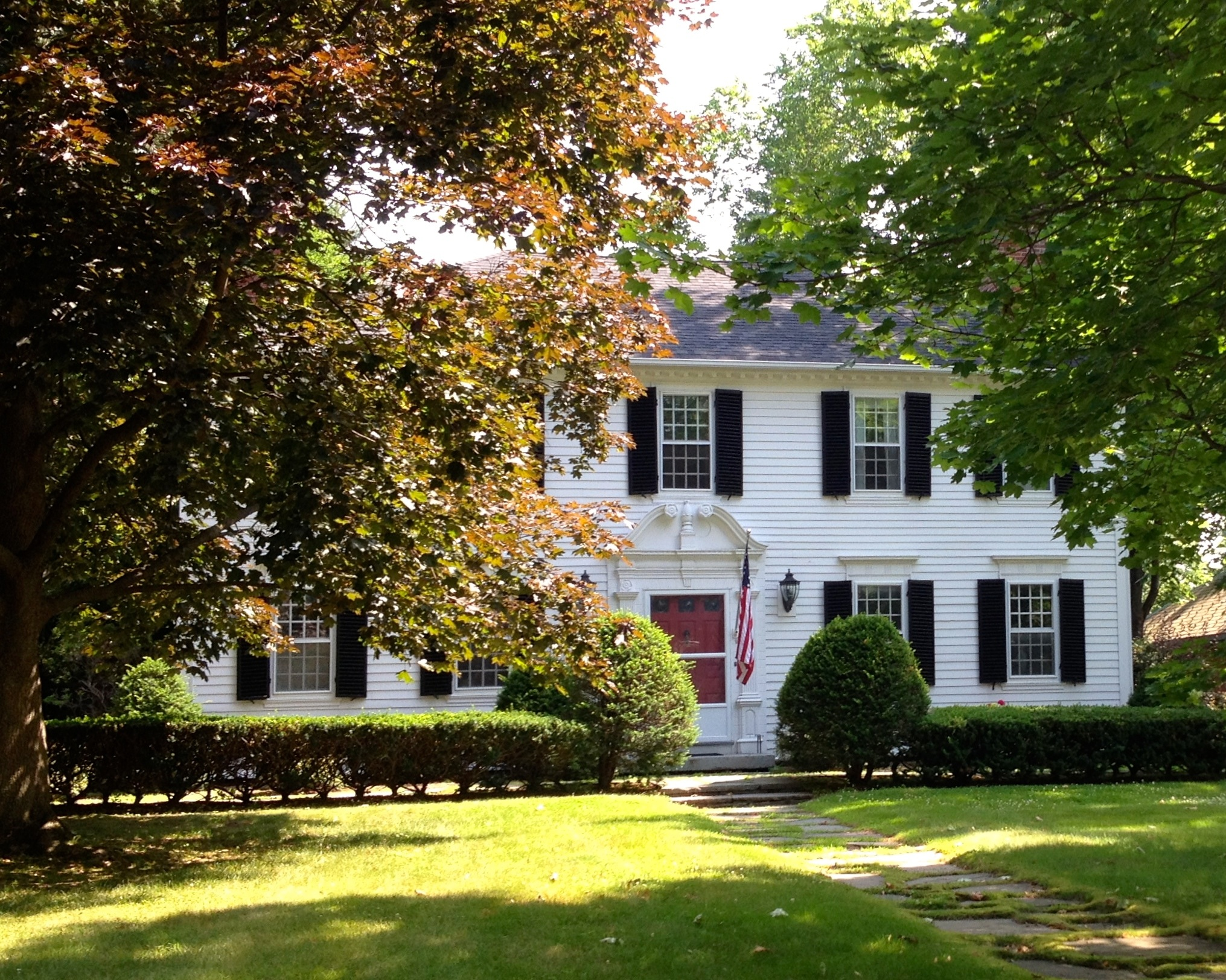
281 Elm Street, Northampton MA. Built 1915 to 1920. Colonial Revival.

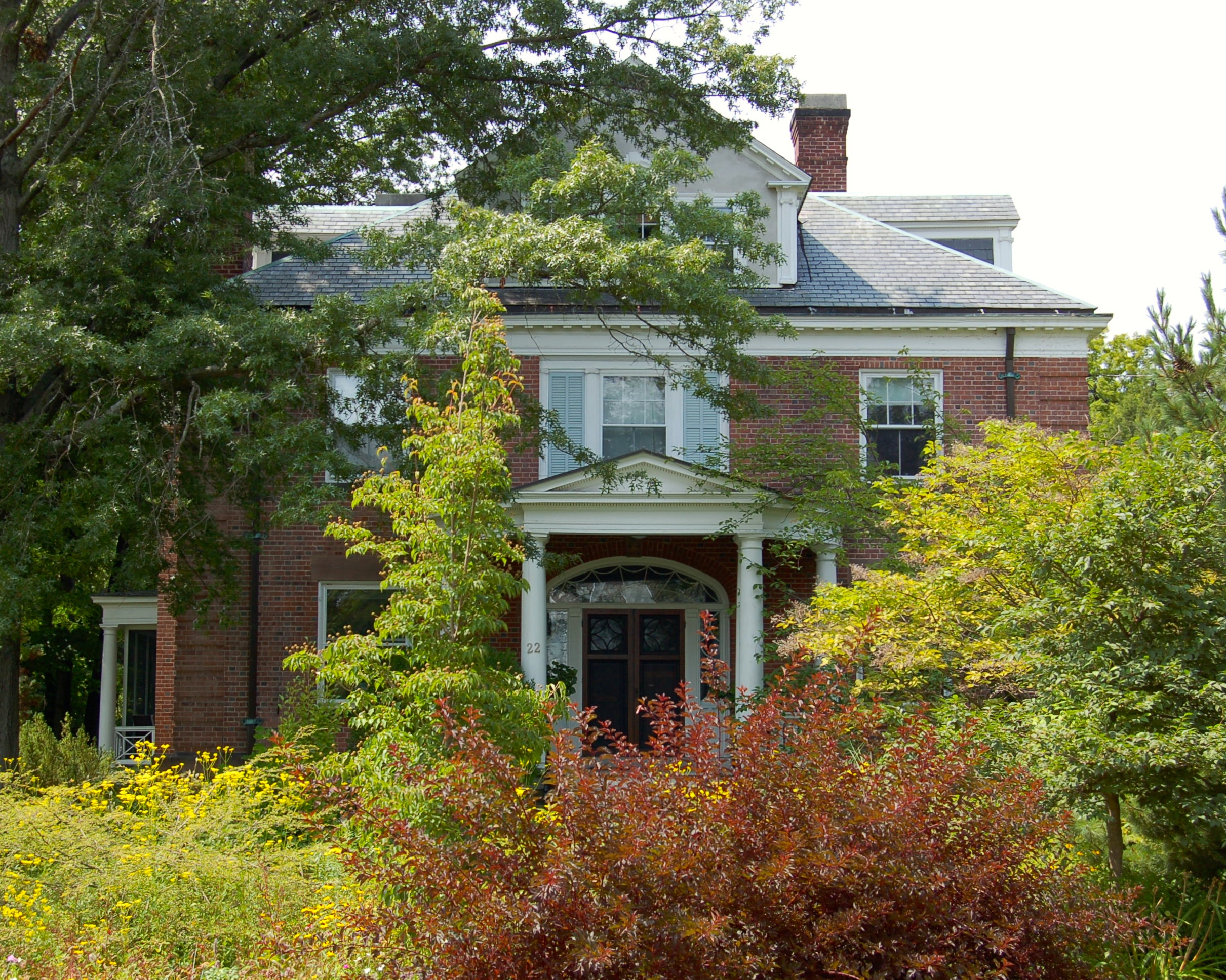
22 Round Hill Road, Northampton, MAs. Built 1909. Colonial Revival.

== Other Revival Architectures ==
Greek Revival examples include 187 Elm Street, 210 Elm Street, and 218 Elm Street.

Gothic Revival examples include: 112 Elm Street, 313 Elm Street, 319 Elm Street, and 354 Elm Street, 23 Round Hill Road, 32 Round Hill Road, 38 Round Hill Road. 112 Elm Street is known as Smith College's Hopkins House. Built in 1861 by renown local architect Wm Fenno Pratt Jr.

Classical Revival example includes: 68 Elm St., known as John M Greene Hall, Smith College. Classical Revival.

Romanesque Revival example includes 48 Elm St., St John's Episcopal Church shown 1905. Romanesque Revival.

Italian Renaissance examples include 310 Elm Street and 345 Elm Street.

Italian Gothic style is reflected in 10 Elm Street, Smith College's "College Hall" which opened in 1875 and remains the central building of Smith College.

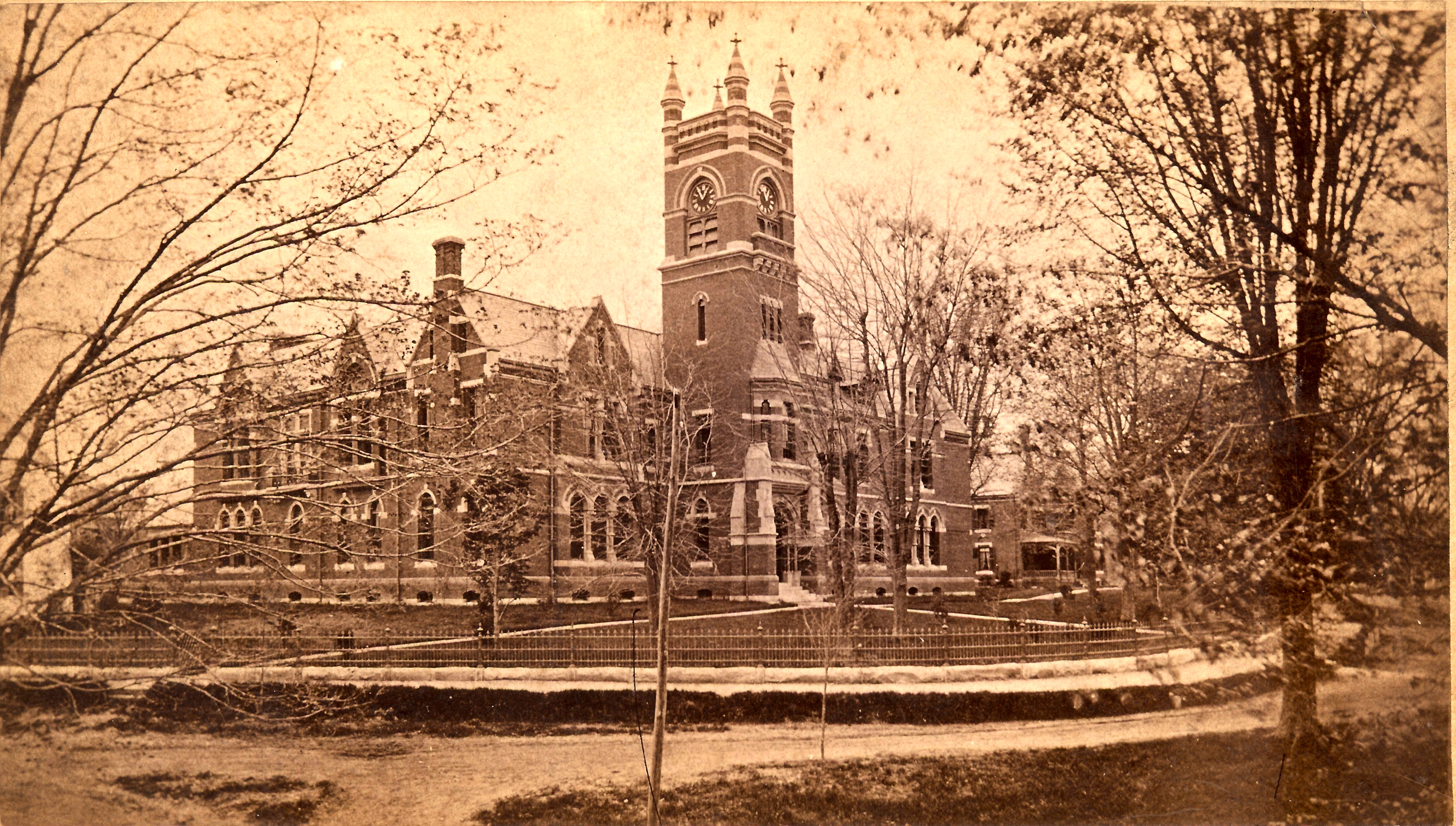
10 Elm Street, Northampton, MA. Built 1875. Photo c. 1895. Italian Gothic, eclectic style.

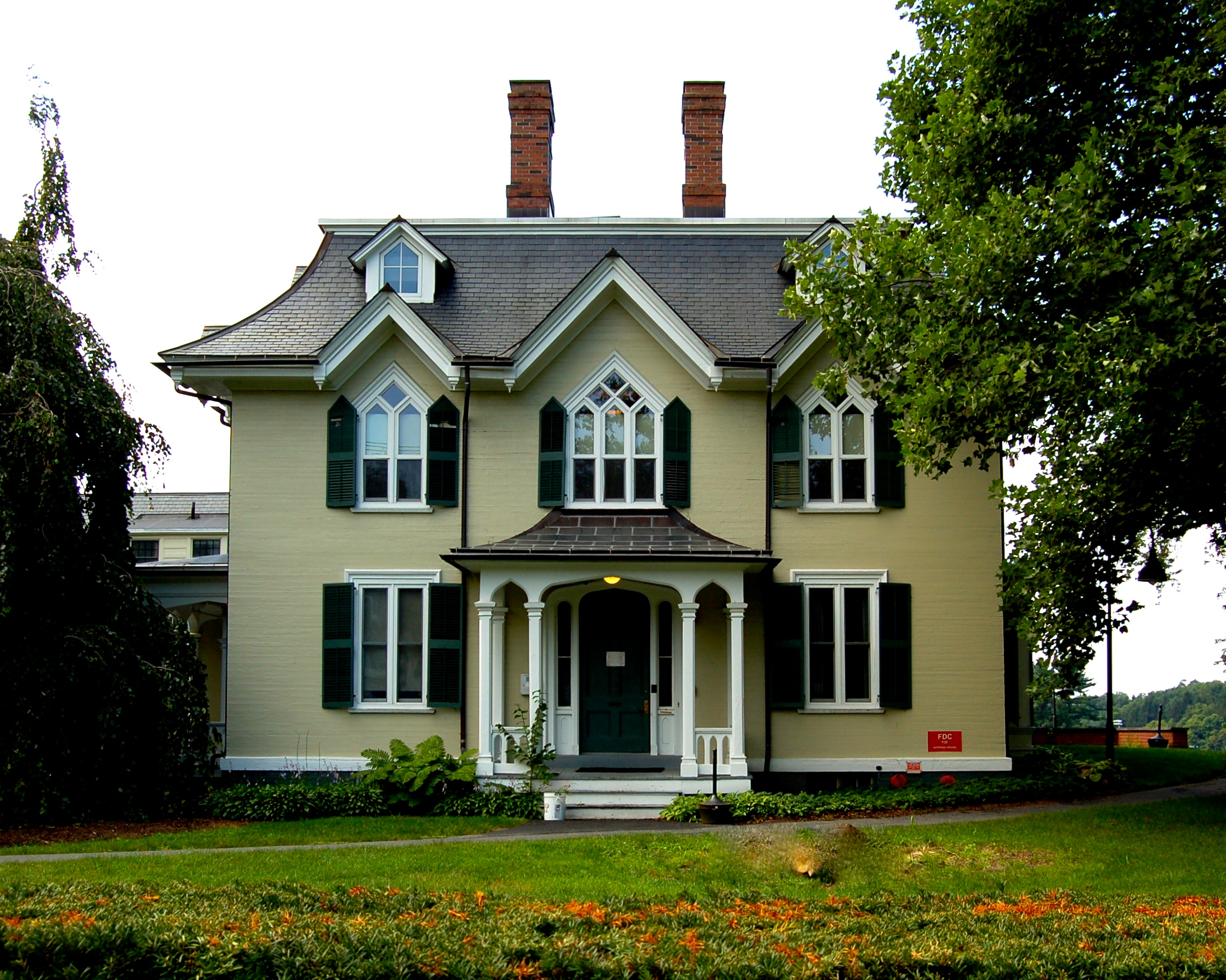
112 Elm Street, Northampton. Built 1861. Gothic Revival.

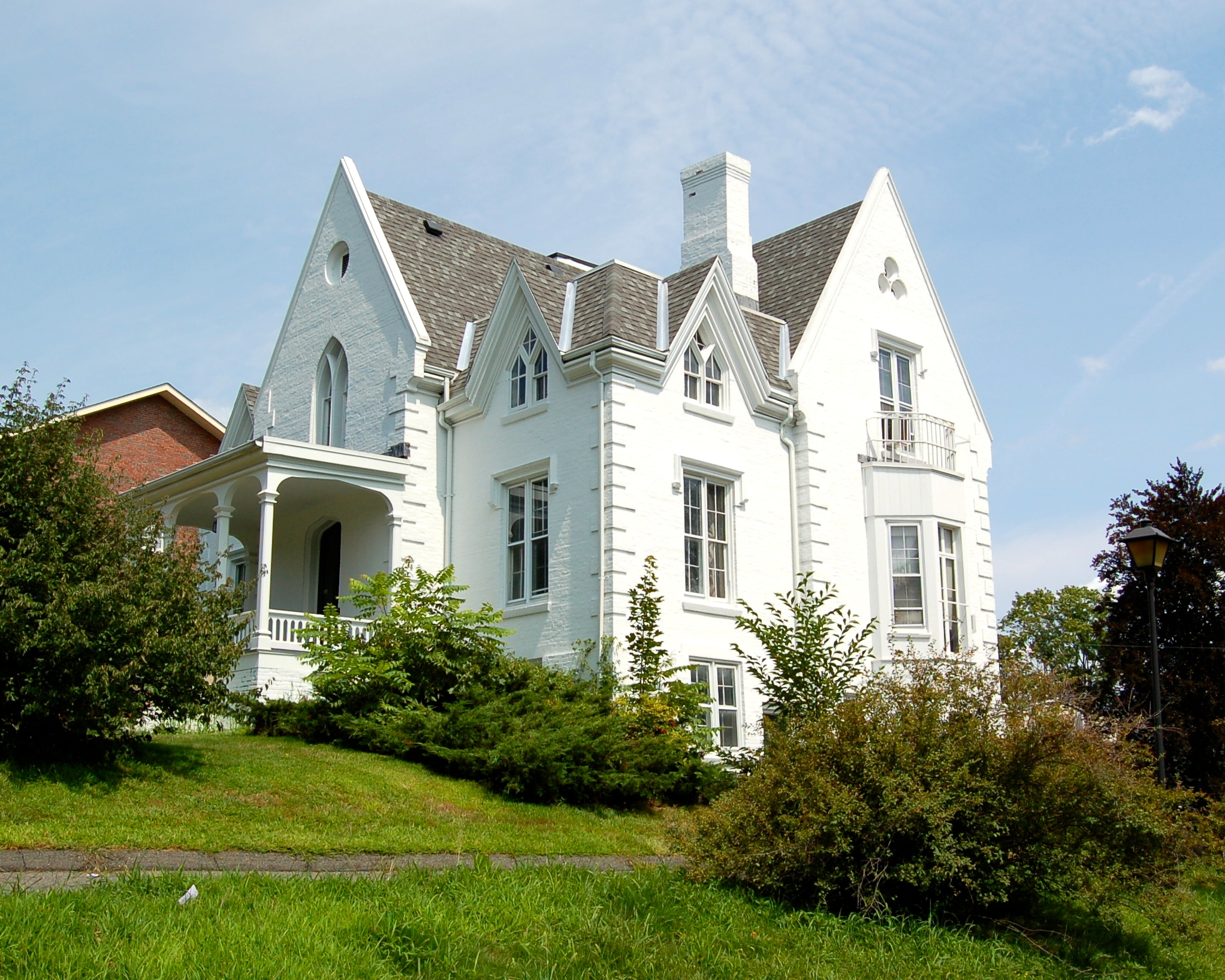
23 Round Hill Road, Northampton, MA. Built 1860. Gothic Revival.

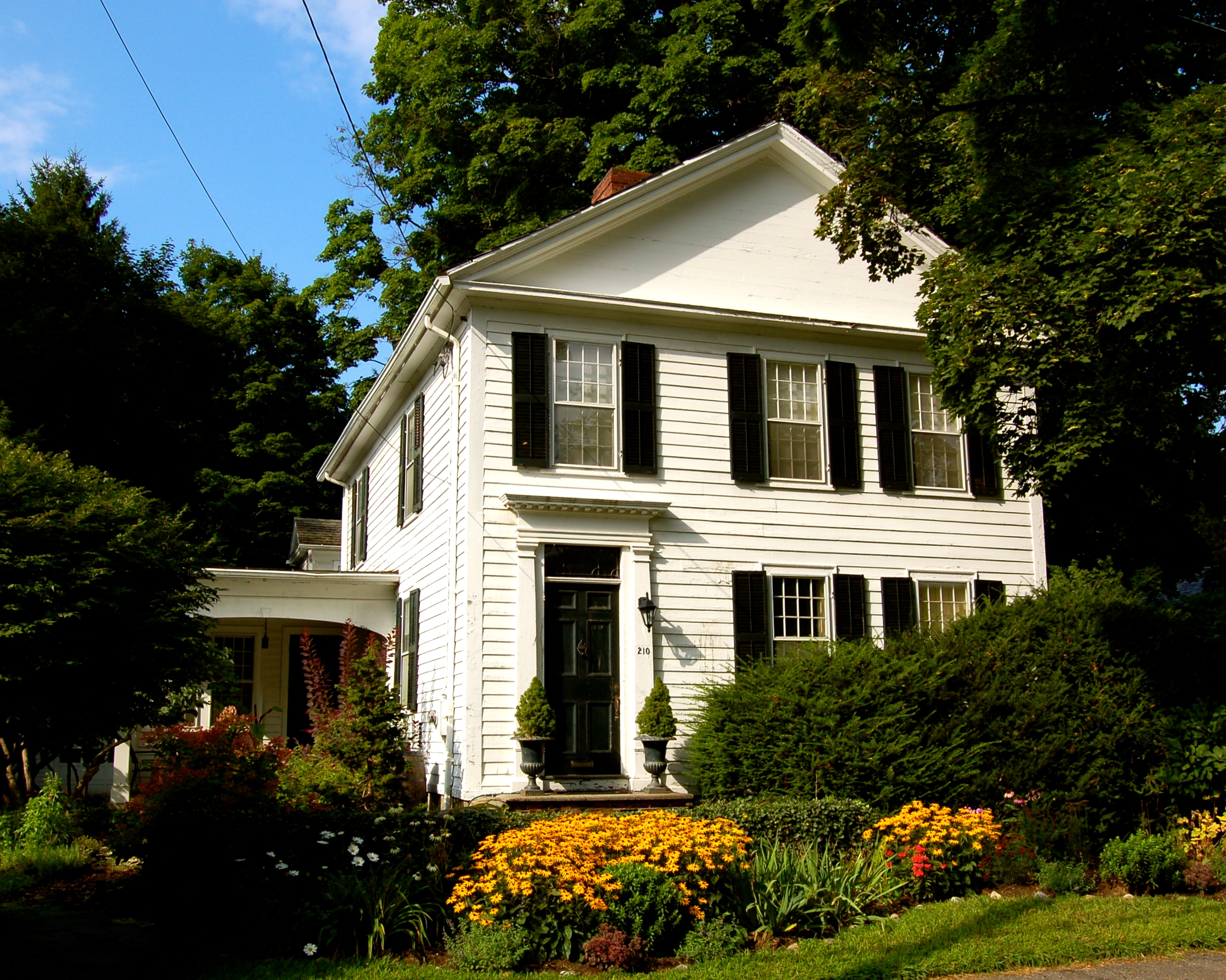
210 Elm Street, Northampton, M. Built 1828. Greek Revival.

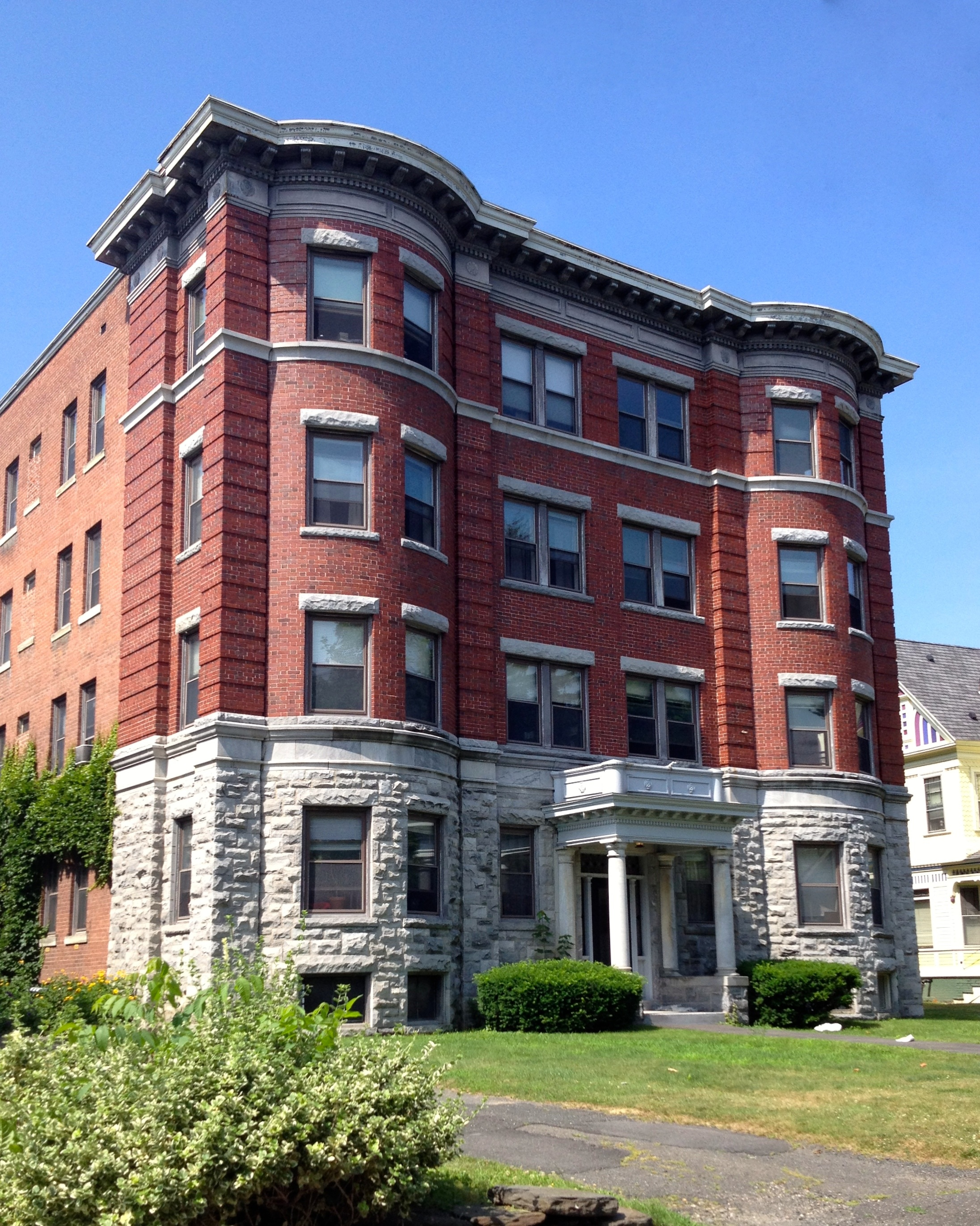
310 Elm Street, Northampton, MA Built c. 1911. Italian Renaissance.

== Various European influence ==
English Cottage style: 20 Round Hill Road.

French Second Empire examples include 45 Elm Street (in a prior expression, now adapted), 105 Elm, 156 Elm and 289 Elm Street.

Italianate examples include: 95 Elm Street, 110 (sometimes referred to as 96) Elm Street, 137 Elm Street, 196 Elm Street, 219 Elm Street, 309 Elm Street and 333 Elm Street. 137 Elm Street was the home of Charles P. Huntington, a noted abolitionist and namesake for the nearby town of Huntington.

Swiss style example includes 354 Elm Street, the Catholic Church at western end of Historic District. One unusual Swiss style building includes 354 Elm Street.

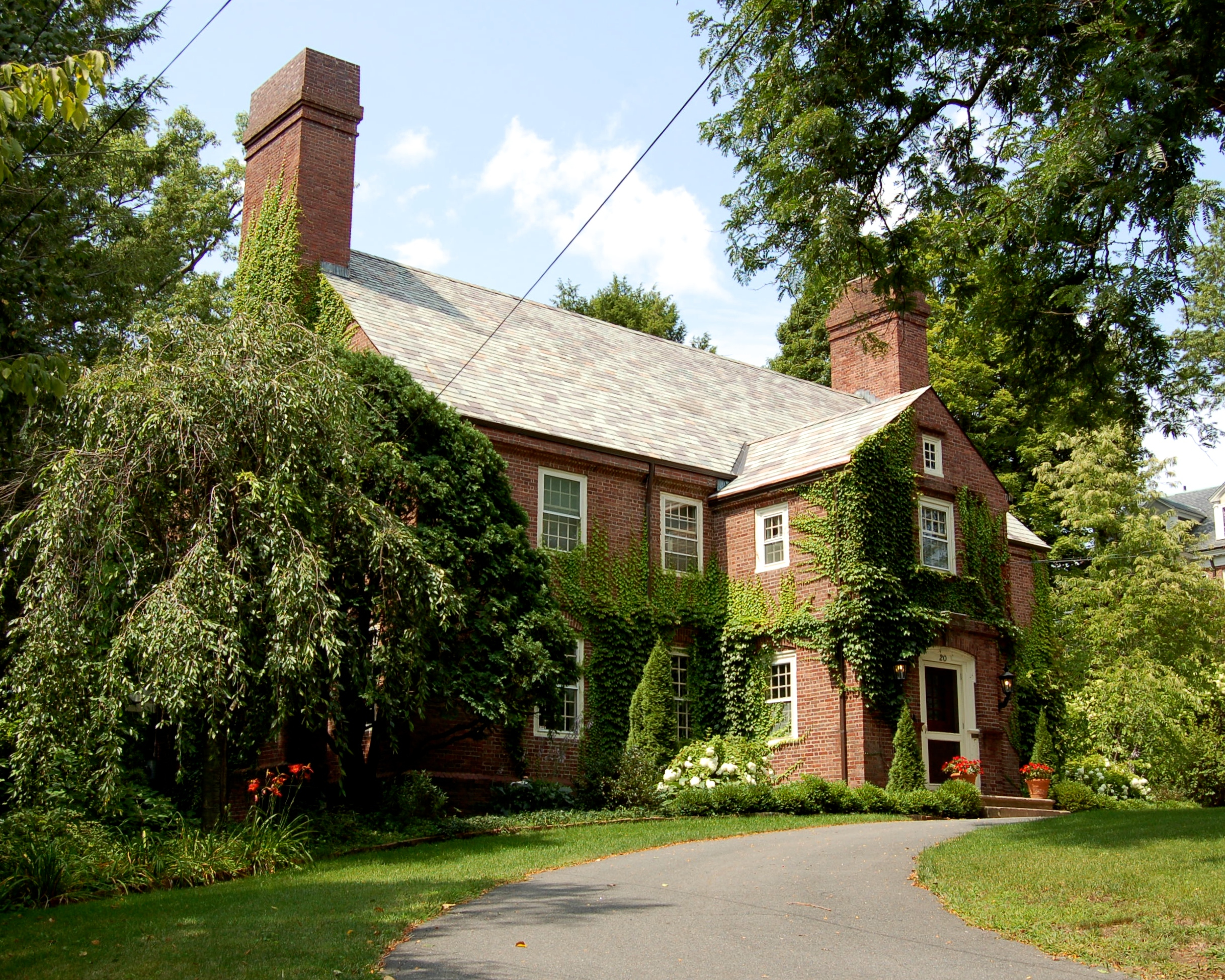
20 Round Hill Road, Northampton, MA. Built 1923. English Cottage style.

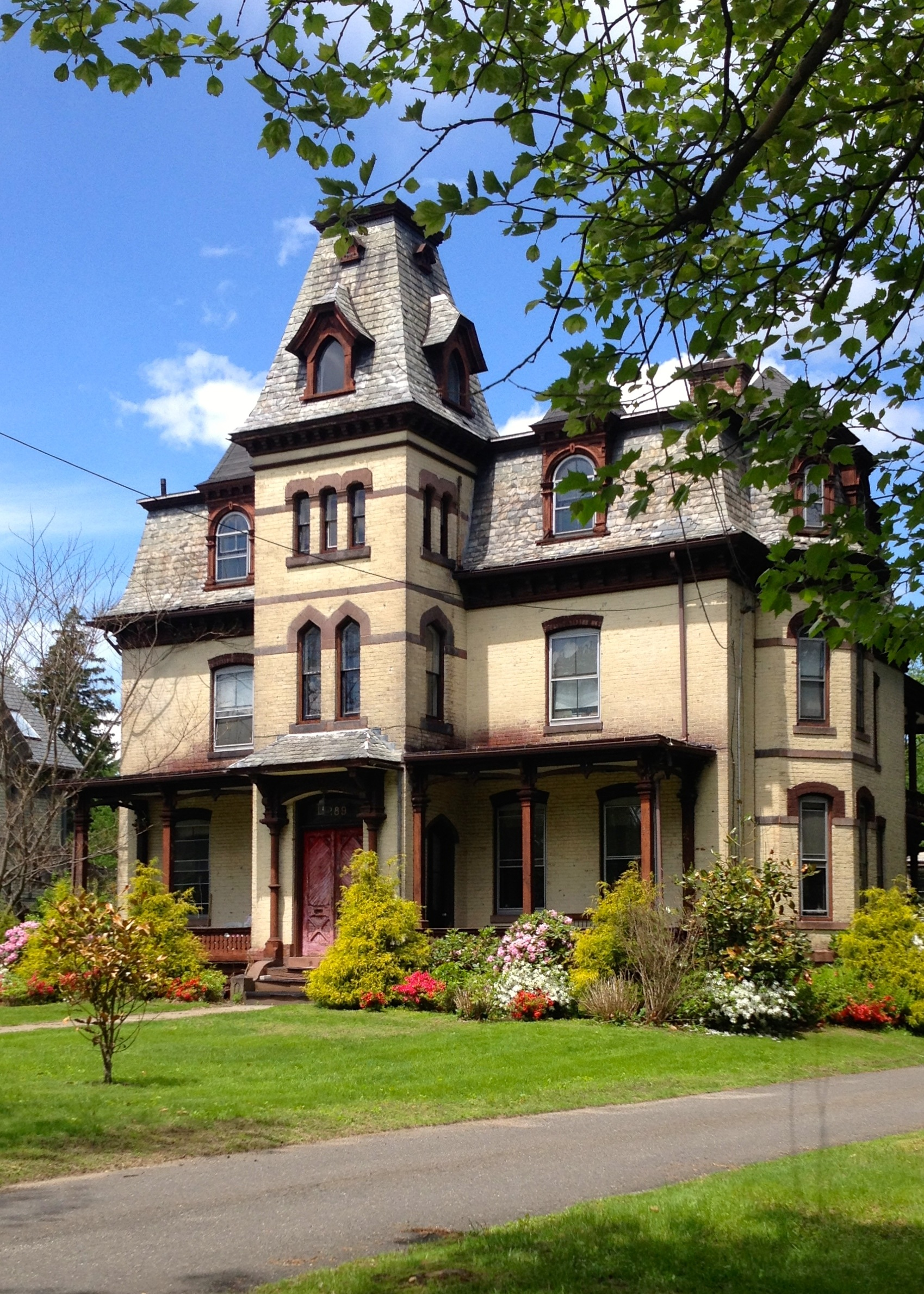
289 Elm Street, Northampton, MA. Built 1860. French Second Empire style.

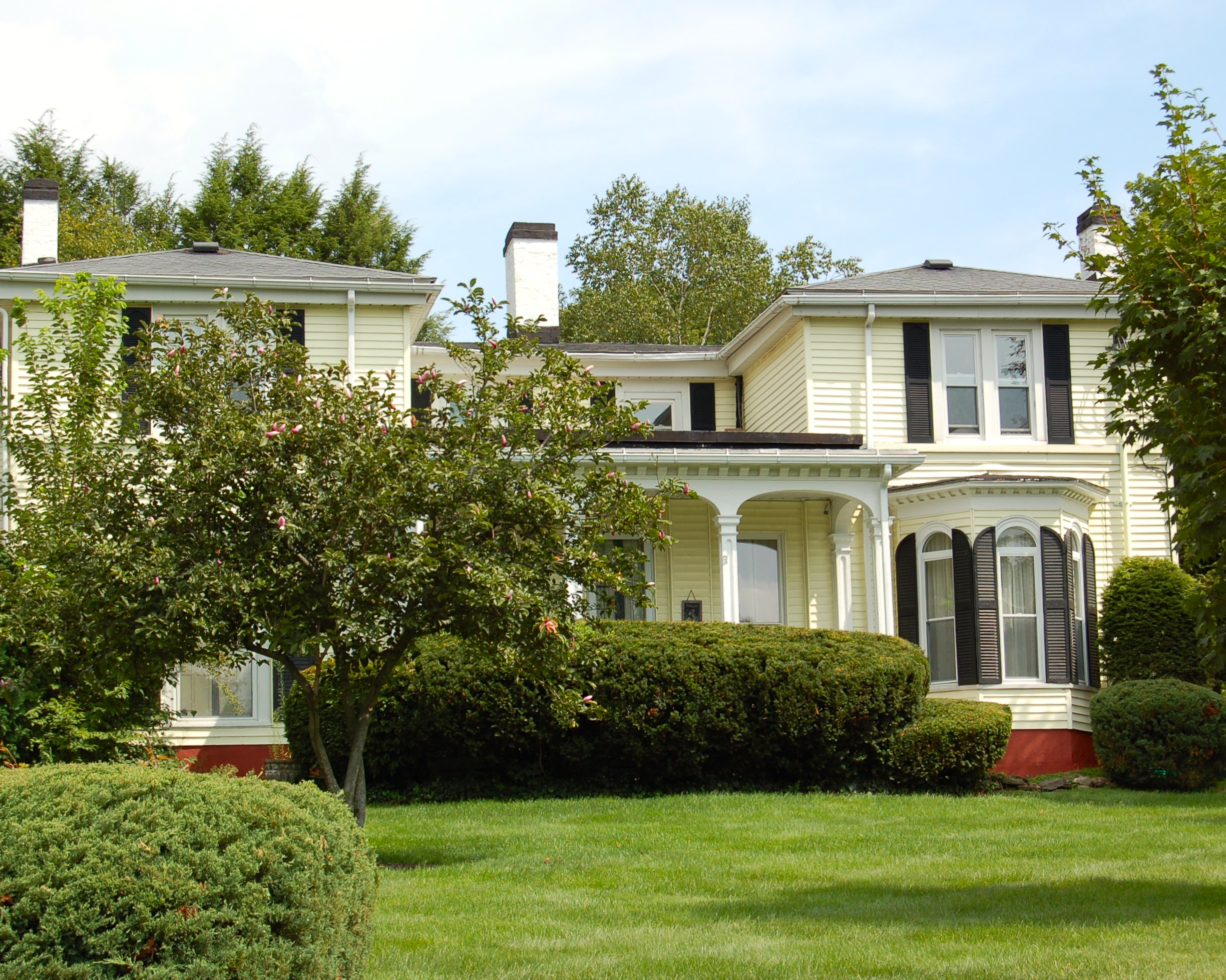
137 Elm Street. Built 1841 in Italianate style.

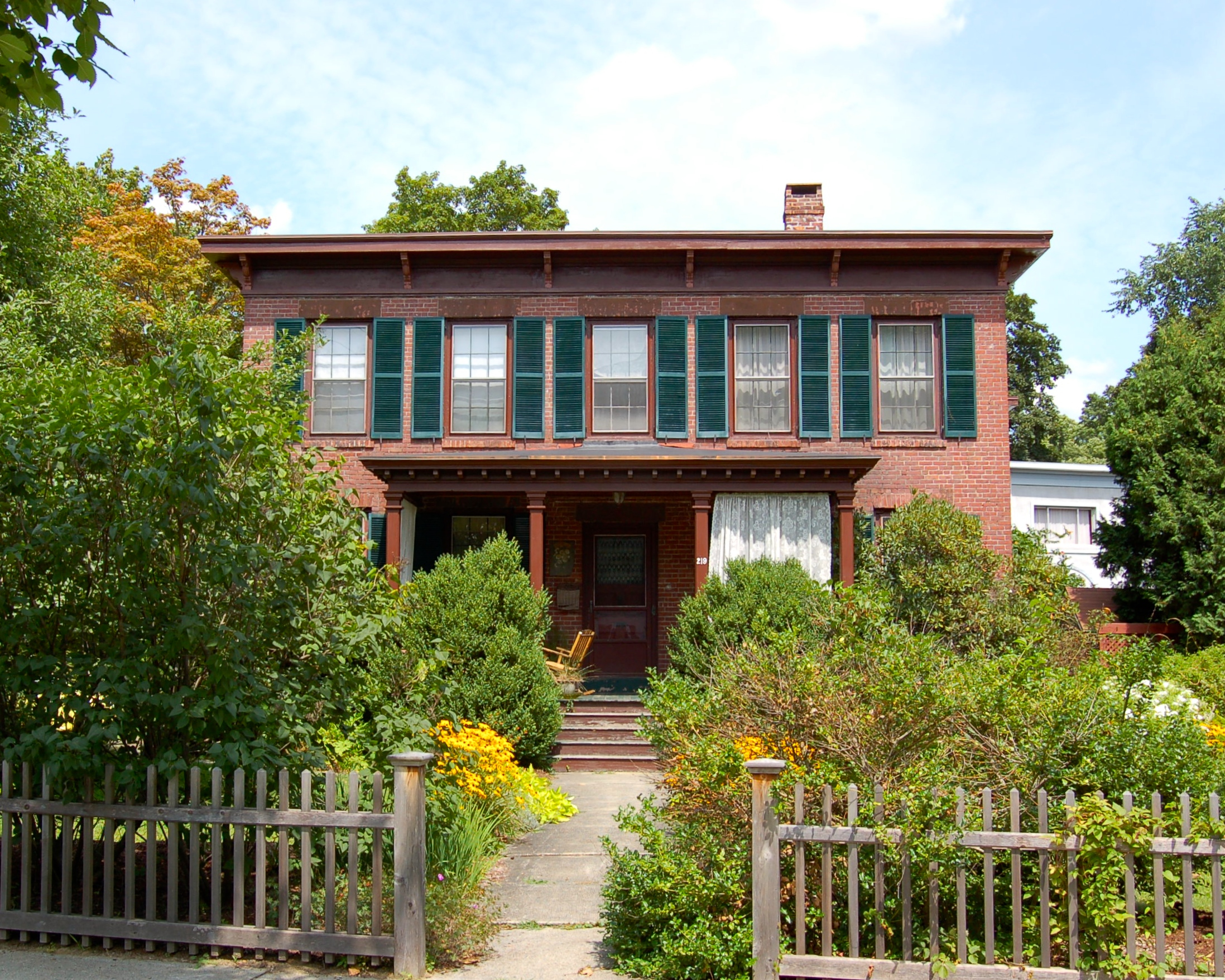
219 Elm Street, Northampton, MA. By local architect Wm Fenno Pratt. Built 1861. Italianate style.

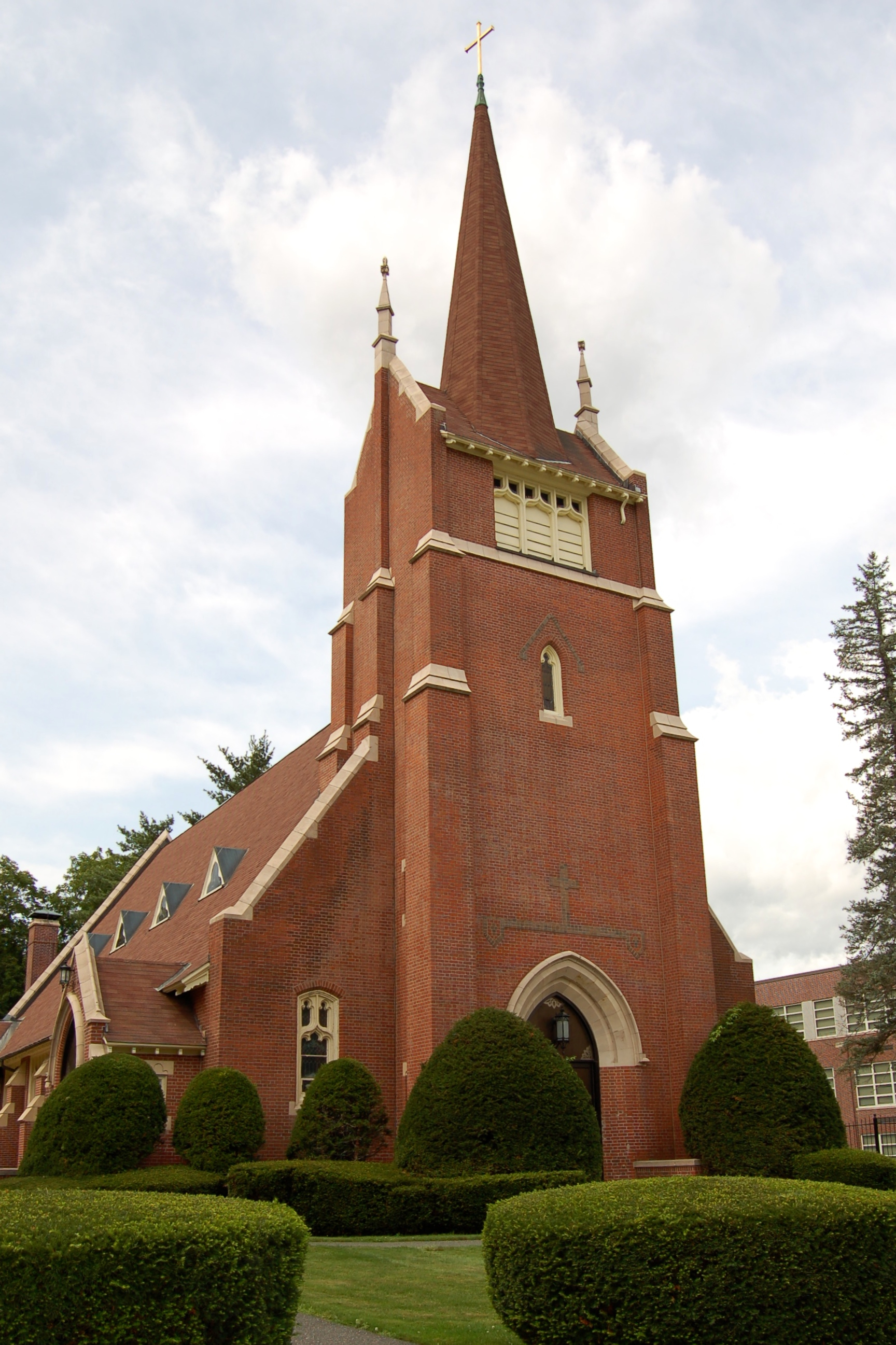
354 Elm Street, Northampton, MA. Built 1900. Swiss style.

== Contemporary and International ==
International style example includes 79 Elm Street and 36 Round Hill Road. Contemporary examples include 20 Elm Street and 100 Elm Street.
