= Federal Square =

Federal Square may refer to:

== United States ==
- Federal Square in Worcester, Massachusetts, a public square in Downtown Worcester
- Federal Square Historic District in Springfield, Massachusetts
- Federal Square in Downtown Newark, New Jersey
