= Harold D. Donohue Federal Building and United States Courthouse =

- U.S. Post Office and Courthouse
- U.S. National Register of Historic Places
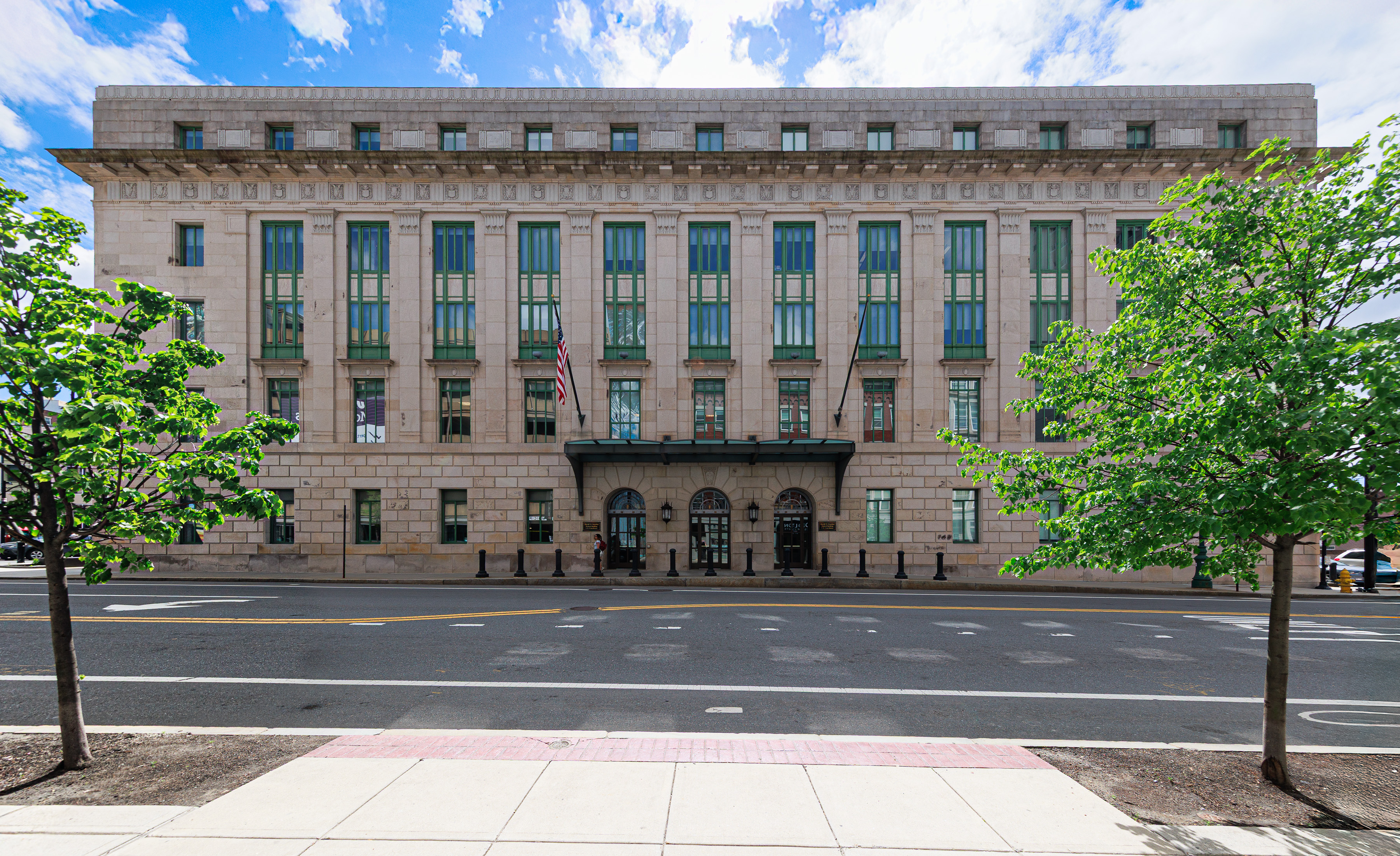
- Main Street façade

- Location within Massachusetts Location within the United States
- Location: 595 Main Street Worcester, Massachusetts
- Coordinates: 42°15′38″N 71°48′14″W
- Built: 1931
- Architect: Simon, Louis A.
- Architectural style: Classical Revival
- NRHP reference No.: 11000161
- Added to NRHP: April 8, 2011

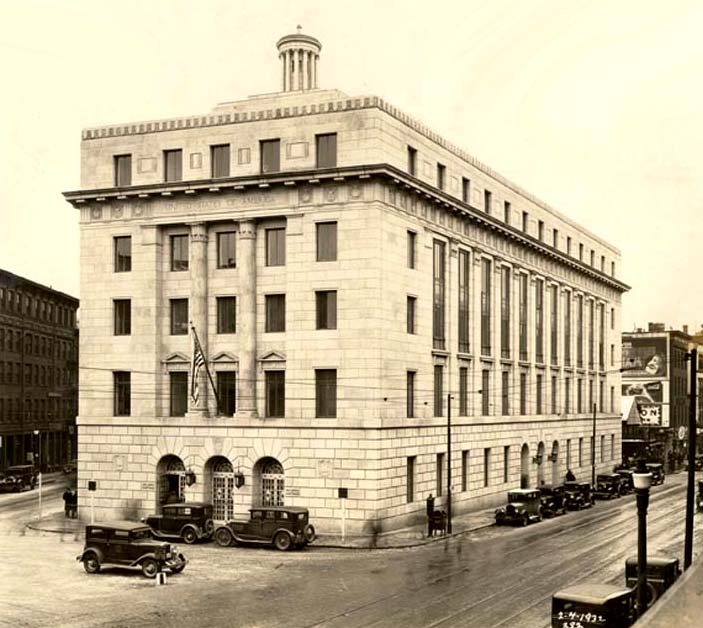

The Harold D. Donohue Federal Building and United States Courthouse, formerly known as the U.S. Post Office and Courthouse, is a courthouse of the United States District Court for the District of Massachusetts located in Worcester, Massachusetts.

== Building history ==
Established in 1722, Worcester remained a relatively small but prosperous village until the 1835 construction of the Boston & Worcester Railroad. The railroad established the town as an important commercial and industrial hub, and businesses burgeoned. In 1848, as a result of rapid growth, Worcester was incorporated as a city. The earliest postal facilities in Worcester were located in postmasters' homes. In 1897, a post office was constructed on the site of the present building. As Worcester expanded in the twentieth century, it needed a courthouse and federal office space in addition to a larger post office building. Officials decided to construct a single building to meet all of those needs. Disputes arose over the selection of a site that was appropriate for a prominent federal building yet situated in a convenient location within the commercial district. Ultimately, the 1897 post office building was demolished and the site utilized for the current building, which would house the first and only presence of the United States District Court in Worcester.

The present building was constructed from 1930 to 1931 with funding made available through the Public Buildings Act of 1926. The design was approved by Louis A. Simon in the Office of the Supervising Architect under James A. Wetmore. The Murch Brothers Construction Company of St. Louis, Missouri, completed the construction for a cost of $670,000 plus an additional $37,747 for the installation of Otis Elevation Company elevators. The building officially opened in January 1932.

In 1987, the building was renamed for Harold D. Donohue, a U.S. Representative and World War II veteran who served in the House from 1947 to 1974. Federal Square, which fronts the northeast elevation of the building, was constructed in 1991. In 1993, the U.S. Post Office left the building and the interior space was reconfigured to accommodate the needs of the court.

The building was a regional winner and finalist in the Building Owners and Managers Association's The Office Building of the Year (TOBY) Award for 1996 to 1997.

The building was listed on the National Register of Historic Places in 2011.

== Architecture ==
The structure is located on a triangular lot in the southern end of the commercial district in Worcester. It is bounded by Main, Myrtle, and Southbridge streets and is adjacent to Federal Square. The five-story building is a blend of the Classical and Renaissance Revival styles of architecture. The building's design conveys the dignity and stability of the federal government, which was particularly important during the Great Depression.

Native New England materials were used to construct the building, which is divided into three horizontal zones: base, midsection, and attic story. The base is clad in West Townsend, Massachusetts, granite laid in ashlar blocks. Middle stories are sheathed in Danby, Vermont, marble. The attic story is distinct and contains bays divided by terra-cotta panels with raised relief motifs bordered by stylized palmettes and inverted waterleaf designs. The attic story is topped by a flat roof. A circular terra-cotta cupola with a colonnade (series of columns) and dome roof sits atop the building.

The narrow northeast facade serves as the principal elevation from a design perspective. It contains monumental engaged columns with granite bases, marble shafts, and terra-cotta capitals. Three arches form an arcade. The central keystone in the arch over the entrance is adorned with a scale of justice and a key motif contained within a cartouche (decorative oval). Beneath the roofline, the frieze contains three recurring motifs. A bull's skull surrounded by oak leaves and banderols is followed by a ram's head festooned with fruit and nuts. A corn wreath crowned with an armorial helmet completes the trio.

The interior of the building has relatively simple finishes that remain primarily in the courtrooms, judges' chambers, lobbies, stair halls, and corridors. The first-floor elevator and postal lobbies retain many original finishes. Floors are covered with pre-cast orange terrazzo set in pigmented grout with polished Travertine and Vermont marble inlay. The plaster walls have marble wainscot. Brass radiator grilles, bronze writing desks, and an iron grille above the original service entrance remain. The transom area above the opening to the staircase in the west entrance vestibule is adorned with a raised-relief plaster eagle, which conveys the federal presence.

The building was renovated between 1972 and 1973. At that time, major mail processing activities moved to a recently completed facility nearby. Hellman-Kempton Associates of Falmouth, Massachusetts, retrofitted the building for new tenants. This work left the building exterior intact, but the interior was reconfigured. The renovation included the replacement of windows; removal of skylights; and installation of new floors, ceilings, light fixtures, plumbing, and wiring. A portion of the west postal lobby and the postal workroom were divided into smaller spaces.

Between 1993 and 1995, a lightwell that extended from the second to the fifth stories in the central portion of the building was filled to accommodate additional courtrooms. In 1995, artist Michael Hachey completed a mural to commemorate the case of Quock Walker, an African-American slave who successfully sued for his freedom in a 1783 case that was popularly believed to have abolished slavery in Massachusetts.

== Significant events ==
- 1897: First post office building constructed on site
- 1930–32: Earlier post office building demolished and new building constructed
- 1972–73: Building renovations upon departure of majority of post office functions
- 1987: Building renamed to honor U.S. Representative Harold D. Donohue
- 1993–95: Courtrooms addition constructed
- 1996–97: Regional winner and finalist in TOBY awards

== Building facts ==
- Location: 595 Main Street
- Architects: James A. Wetmore; Leers Weinzapfel Associates
- Construction Dates: 1930–32; 1993–95
- Landmark Status: Eligible for listing in the National Register of Historic Places
- Architectural Style: Classical and Renaissance Revival
- Primary Materials: Granite, Marble, and Terra Cotta
- Prominent Features: Cupola; Decorative frieze

== See also ==
- List of United States post offices
- National Register of Historic Places listings in northwestern Worcester, Massachusetts
- National Register of Historic Places listings in Worcester County, Massachusetts
