= Federal Square (Worcester, Massachusetts) =

Square in Worcester, Massachusetts, United States

- Square in Worcester
- Nickname: Franklin Square
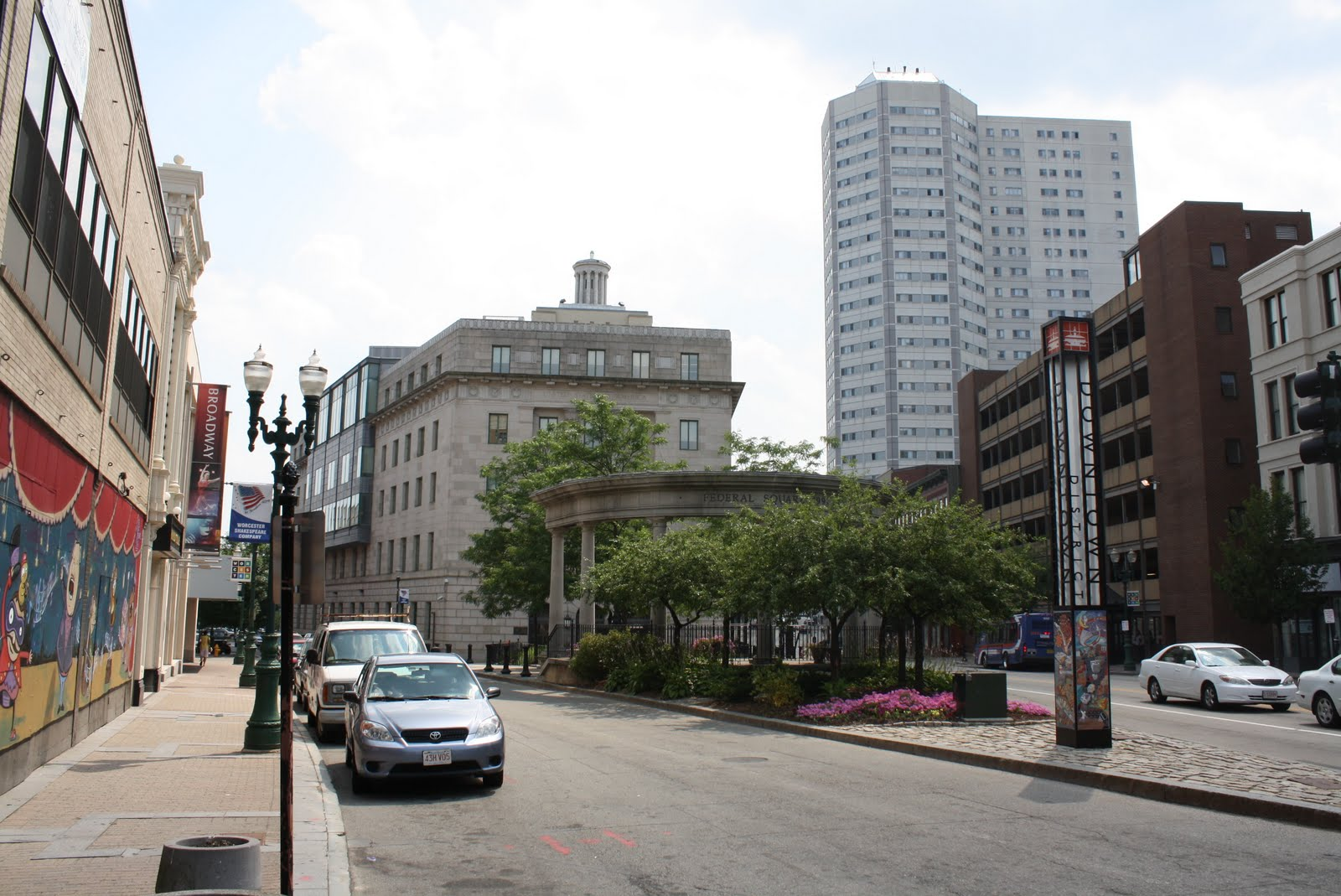
- Federal Square in July 2010. The 6Hundred is visible in the background.
- Features: Hanover Theatre & Conservancy for the Performing Arts
- Named for: Harold D. Donohue Federal Building
- Location: Downtown Worcester, Massachusetts, United States
- Intersection: Main Street, Southbridge Street, Federal Street
- Interactive map of Federal Square
- Coordinates: 42.26103°N 71.80345°W

Federal Square is a public square in Downtown Worcester, bounded by Main Street, Southbridge Street, and Federal Street. The square is named after the Harold D. Donohue Federal Building, which fronts the square to the west. Prior to the opening of the Donohue Federal Building in 1932, the square was named Franklin Square.

The square is largely occupied by Francis R. Carroll Plaza, a public park named after Francis Carroll, a local businessman and philanthropist.

== Francis R. Carroll Plaza ==
Originally known as Federal Square Plaza, the small urban park in Federal Square was renamed Francis R. Carroll Plaza in 2008.

In 2019, a US$1.5 million reconstruction of Francis R. Carroll Plaza began as part of a US$13 million rehabilitation project to improve Main Street. The project added new tables, chairs, decorative lighting, public art, benches, trash cans, and trees. A decorative colonnade and an obsolete fountain were removed from the plaza to make way for the improvements. A section of Southbridge Street was pedestrianized as part of the project, extending the plaza to the front door of the Hanover Theatre. The reconstruction project was finished in Summer 2023.

== Image gallery ==
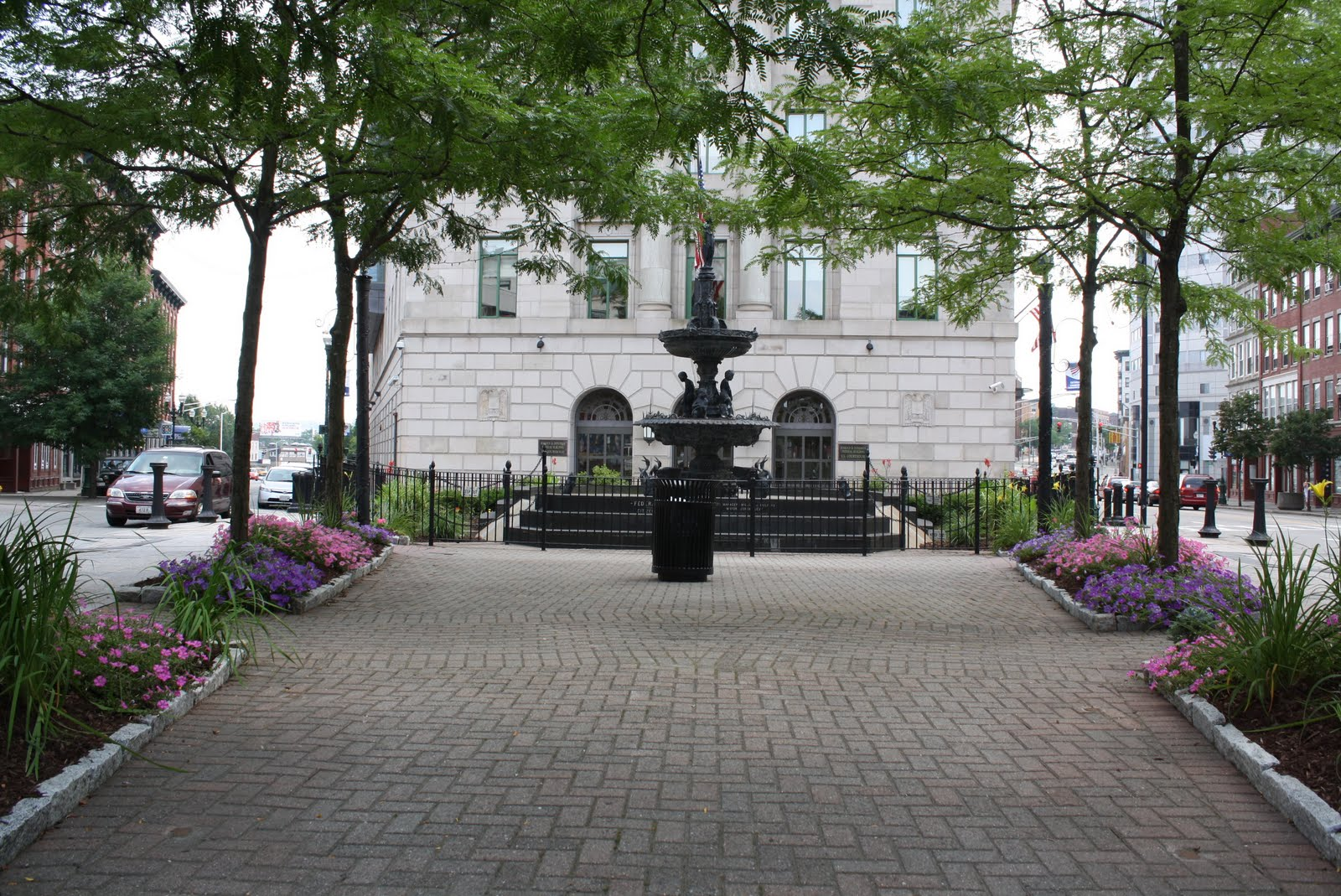
Francis R. Carroll Plaza in 2010

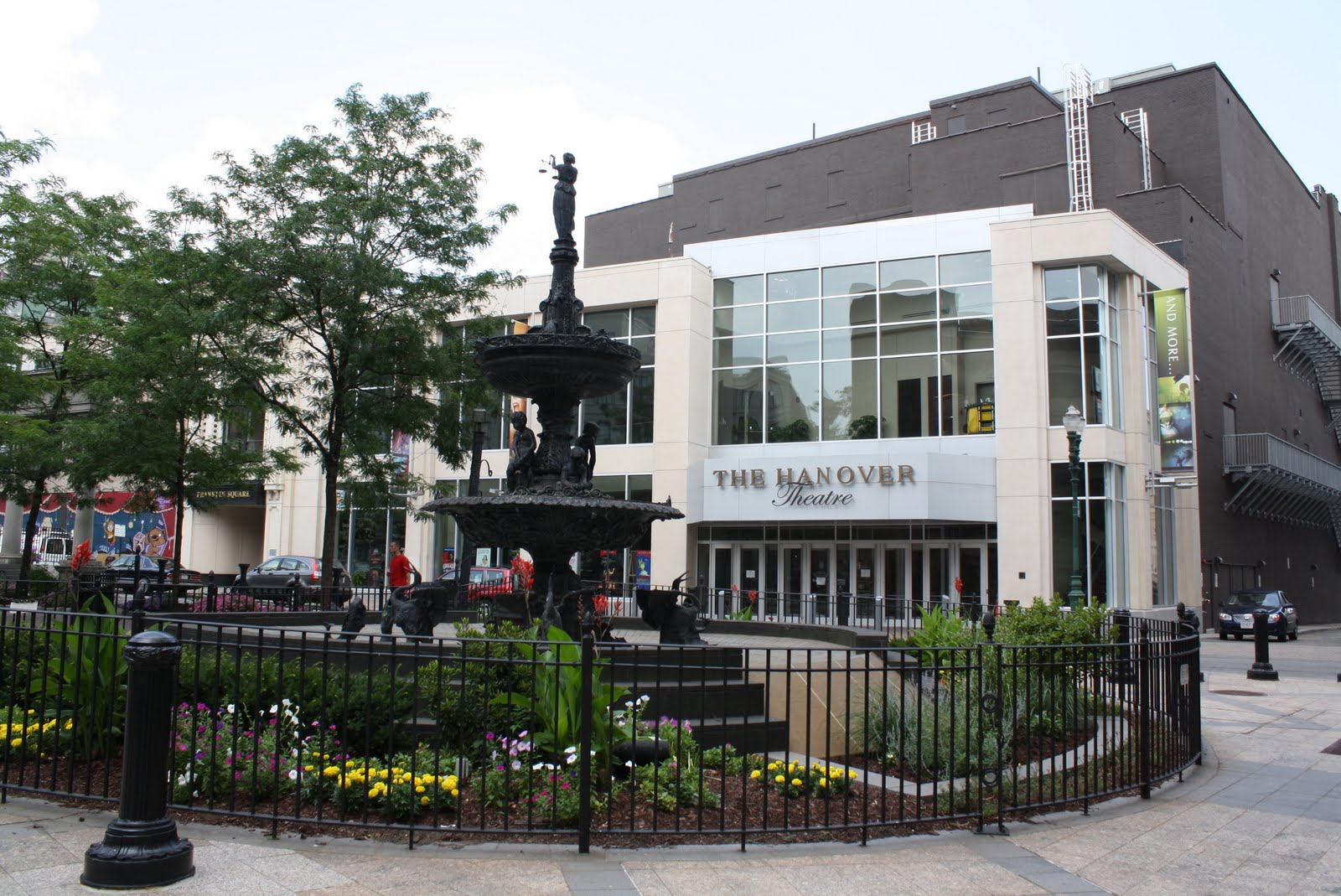
A fountain in Francis R. Carroll Plaza, with the Hanover Theatre visible in the background

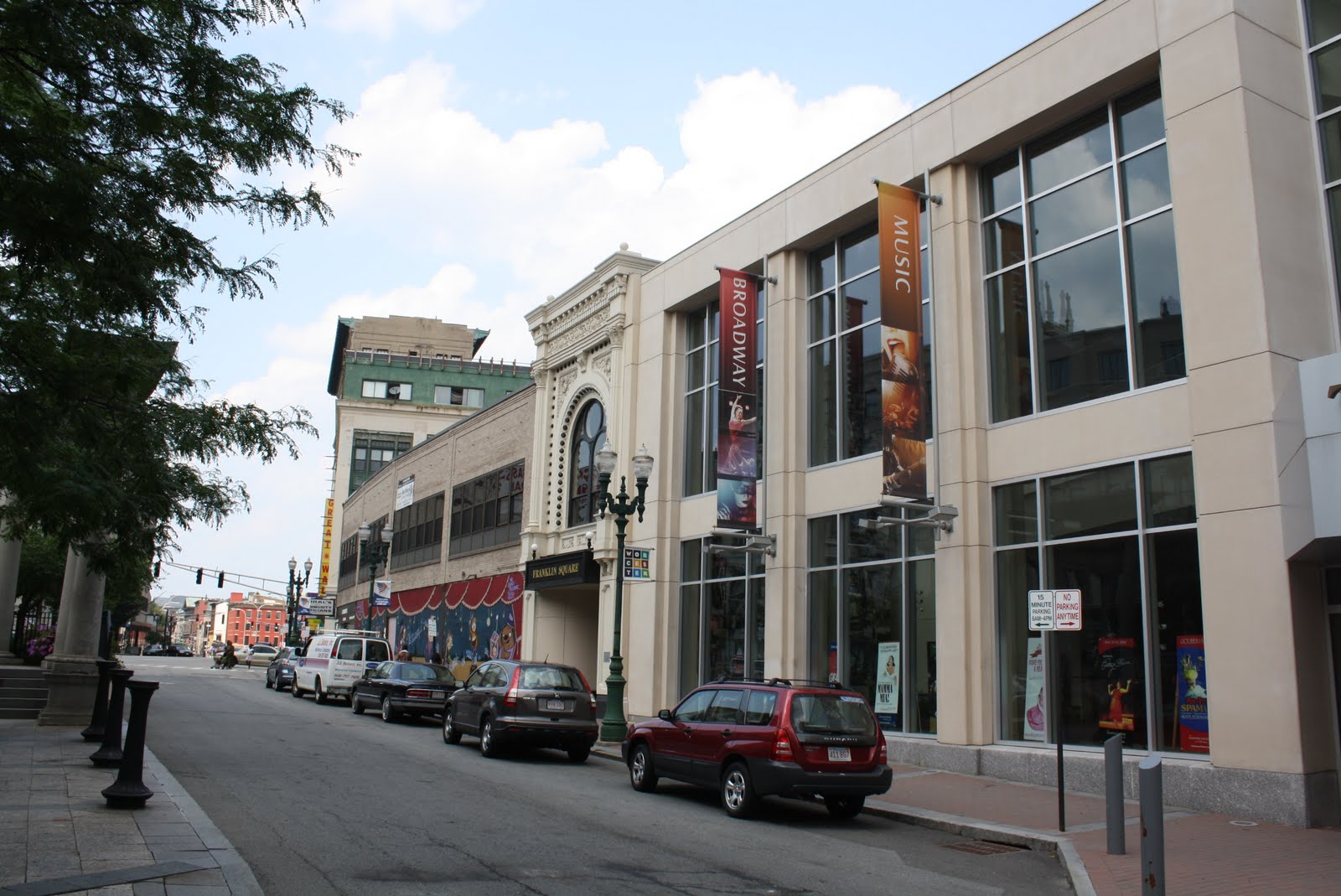
Federal Square in July 2010

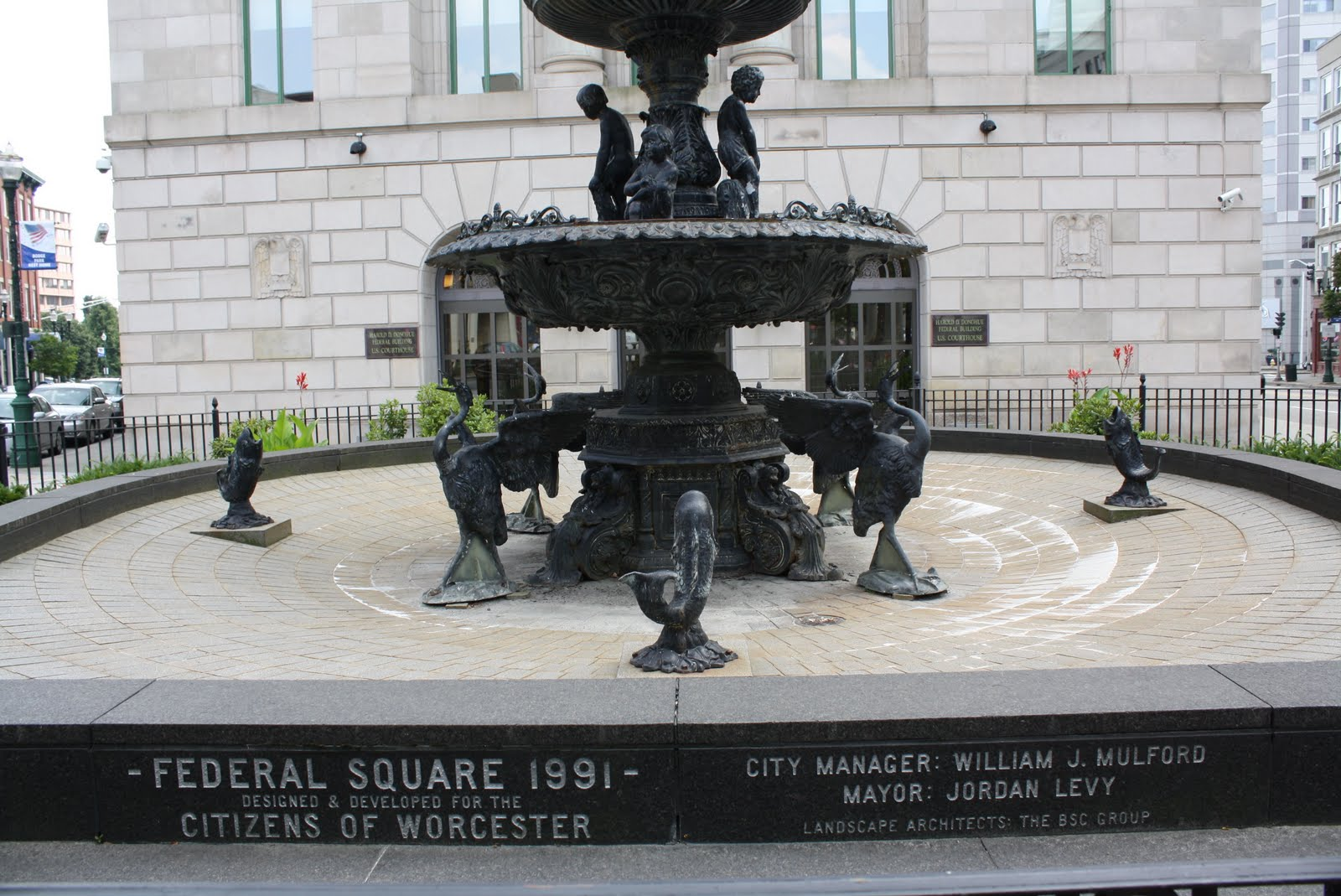
A decorative fountain in Francis R. Carroll Plaza, with the Donohue Federal Building visible in the background

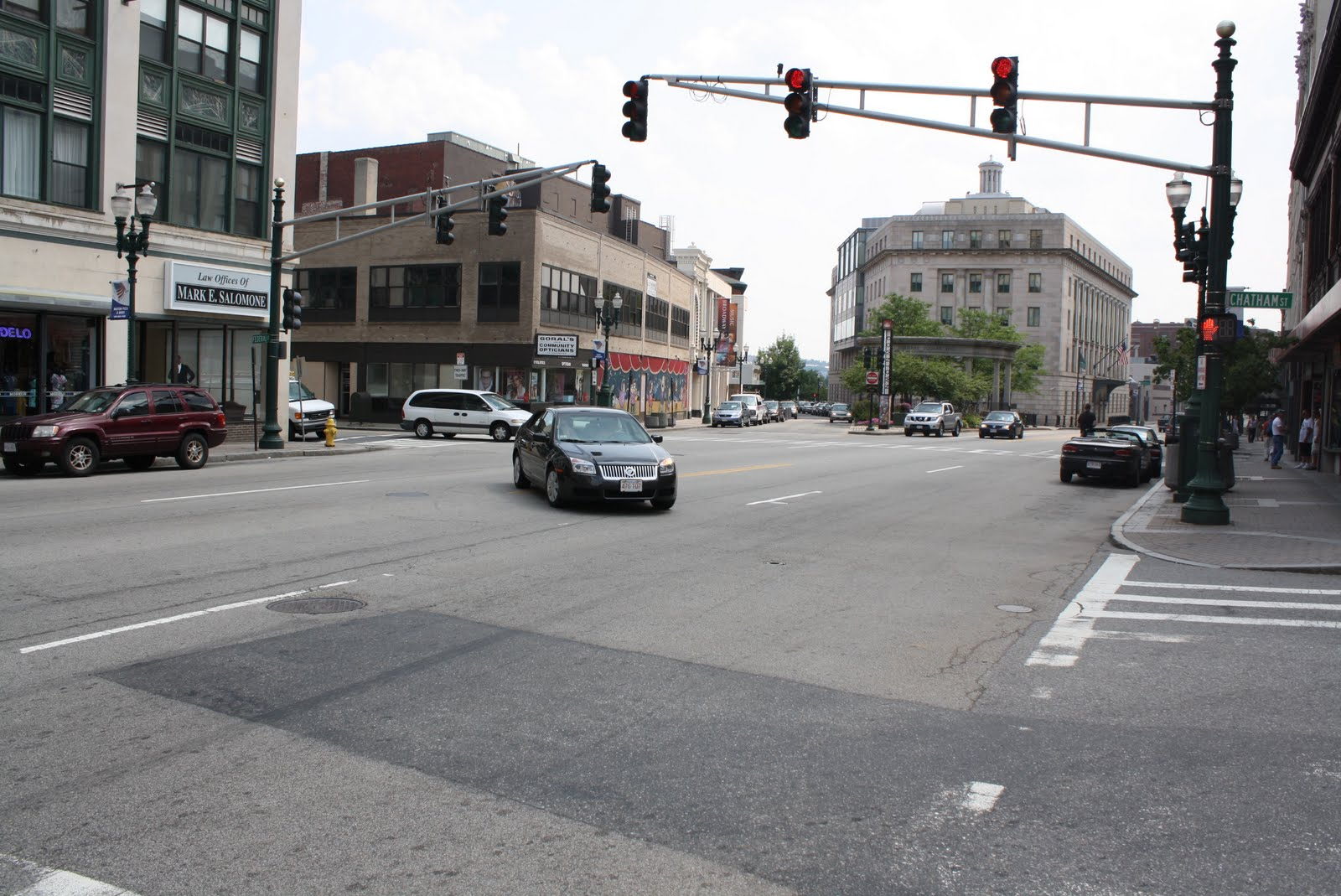
Federal Square viewed from Chatam Street in 2010
