= Federal Square Historic District (Springfield, Massachusetts) =

Historic district in Massachusetts, United States

- U.S. National Register of Historic Places
- U.S. Historic district
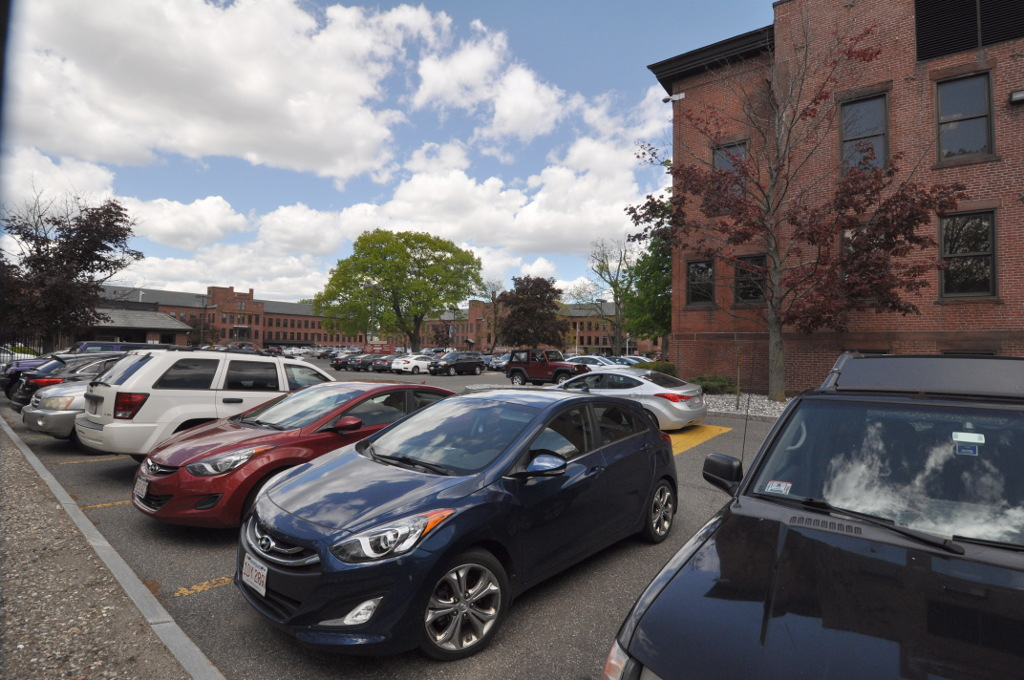

- Location within Massachusetts Location within the United States
- Location: 1 Federal St., Springfield, Massachusetts
- Coordinates: 42°6′33″N 72°34′40″W
- Area: 17 acres (6.9 ha)
- Built: 1880
- Architectural style: Classical Revival; Art Deco
- NRHP reference No.: 100003546
- Added to NRHP: March 15, 2019

The Federal Square Historic District is a historic district encompassing a portion of the former Springfield Armory in Springfield, Massachusetts. Located across Federal Street from the main Armory grounds, Federal Square was the site of some of armory's early facilities, including a Continental Army magazine during the American Revolutionary War. It was also the site of a brief clash in Shays' Rebellion, in which four rebels were killed. The district was added to the National Register of Historic Places in 2019. It is currently being developed by Springfield Technical Community College as a technology business center.

== Description and history ==
Federal Square is located adjacent to the Springfield Armory National Historic Site, but forms part of the historic armory grounds, occupying an entire city block bounded by Federal, State, Magazine, and Lincoln Streets. The block is lined by wrought iron fencing, with the principal vehicular entrance on Federal Street. There are nine historically significant buildings square, including four built in the period between 1880 and 1900 in the Classical Revival style, and two built in the 1940s with Art Deco styling. Near the junction of State and Federal Streets stands a replica of one of the 1767 Milestones.

The Federal Square area has been part of the Springfield Armory since 1782 but was not significantly developed for the manufacture of arms until the second half of the 19th century. It is here that weapons were made for the Spanish–American War and World War I, and where the M1 carbine rifle was developed. During World War II Federal Square is believed to have been the largest single manufactory of weapons in the world, producing 3.5 million M1s. In the post-war years, Federal Square became a research and development center, and was closed along with the rest of the armory in 1968.

== See also ==
- National Register of Historic Places listings in Springfield, Massachusetts
- National Register of Historic Places listings in Hampden County, Massachusetts
