= Catherine Ahern Three-Decker =

- U.S. National Register of Historic Places
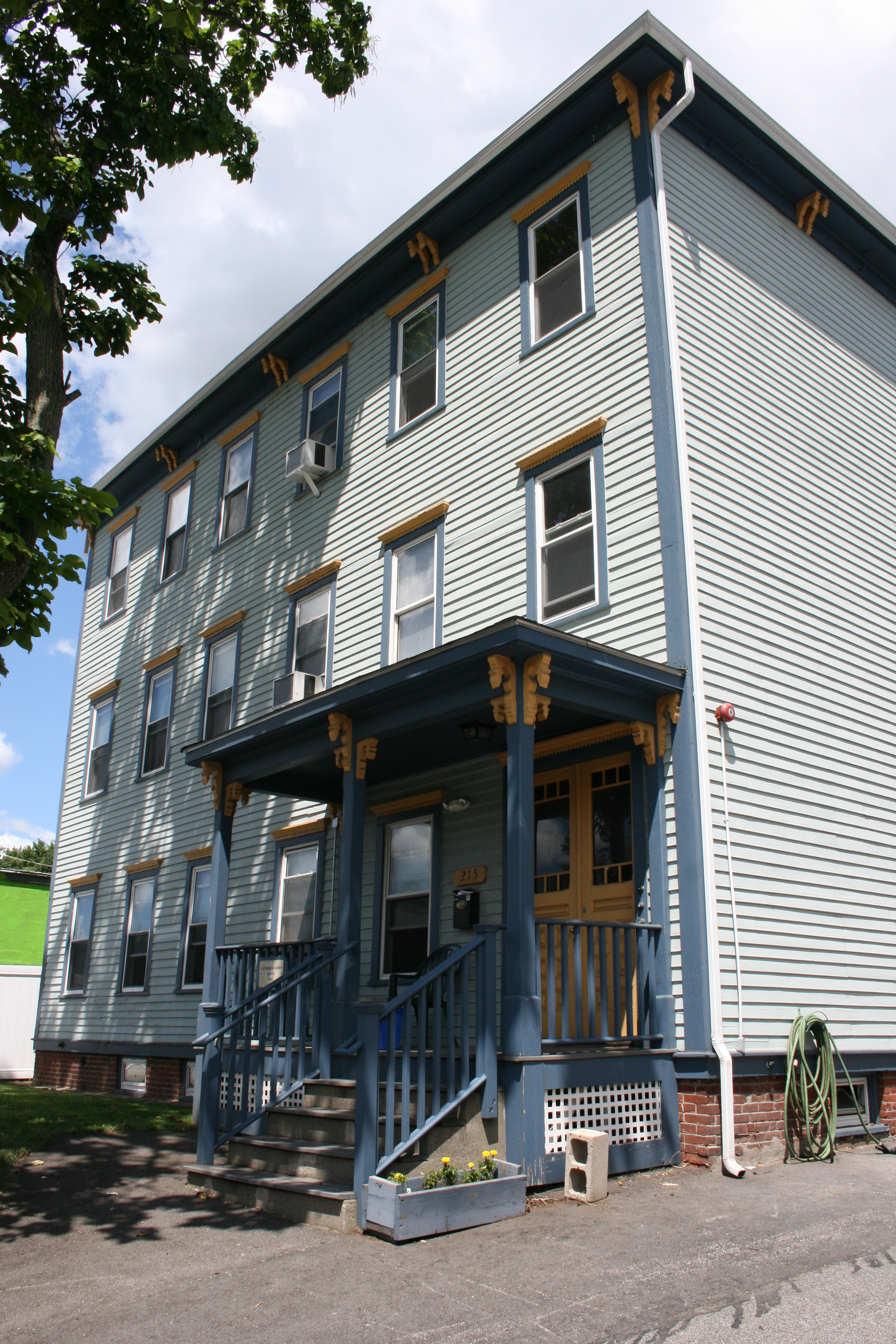

- Location within Massachusetts Location within the United States
- Location: 215 Cambridge St., Worcester, Massachusetts
- Coordinates: 42°14′37″N 71°49′20″W
- Built: 1888
- Architectural style: Italianate
- MPS: Worcester Three-Deckers TR
- NRHP reference No.: 89002392
- Added to NRHP: February 9, 1990

The Catherine Ahern Three-Decker is a historic triple decker in Worcester, Massachusetts. It is a well-preserved example of a triple-decker that predates the popularity of that building type. Built in 1888, it has Italianate design details, including a low pitch hipped roof, and a decorated porch sheltering the front door. It is unusual in that its long side faces the street. Its first documented owner was Catherine Ahern.

The building was listed on the National Register of Historic Places in 1990.

== See also ==
- National Register of Historic Places listings in southwestern Worcester, Massachusetts
- National Register of Historic Places listings in Worcester County, Massachusetts
