= John Mark Three-Decker =

- U.S. National Register of Historic Places
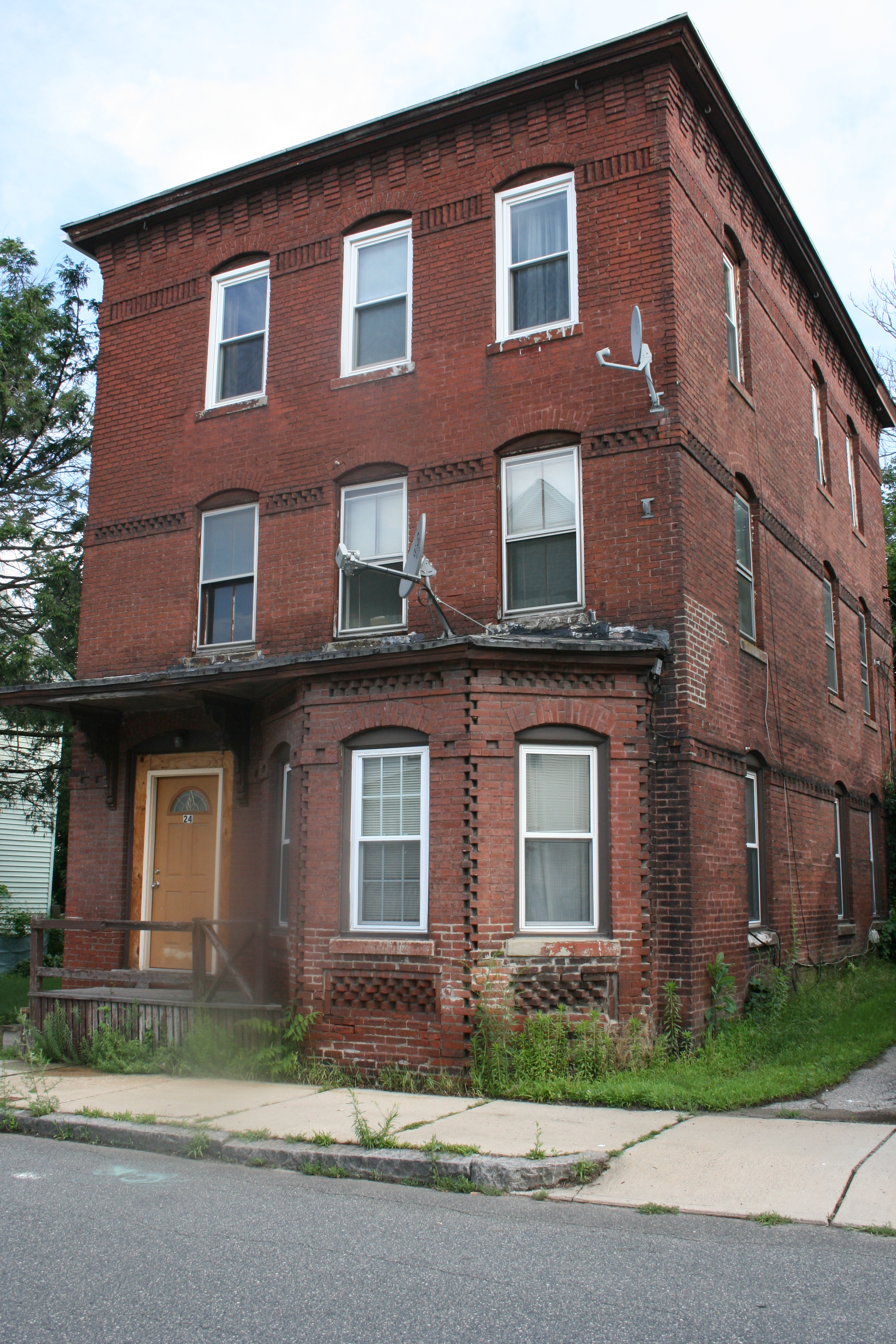

- Location within Massachusetts Location within the United States
- Location: 24 Sigel St., Worcester, Massachusetts
- Coordinates: 42°15′6″N 71°48′10″W
- Built: 1888
- Architectural style: Italianate
- MPS: Worcester Three-Deckers TR
- NRHP reference No.: 89002435
- Added to NRHP: February 9, 1990

The John Mark Three-Decker is a historic triple decker in Worcester, Massachusetts. It is a rare example in the city of the form executed in brick. It was built in 1888 by John Mark, a mason who also lived in the building. The front door is sheltered by an overhang supported by heavy brackets, which extends over a first floor bay section to the doors right. There are bands of decorative brickwork between the floors.

The building was listed on the National Register of Historic Places in 1990.

== See also ==
- National Register of Historic Places listings in southwestern Worcester, Massachusetts
- National Register of Historic Places listings in Worcester County, Massachusetts
