= Stearns Tavern =

- Formerly listed on the U.S. National Register of Historic Places
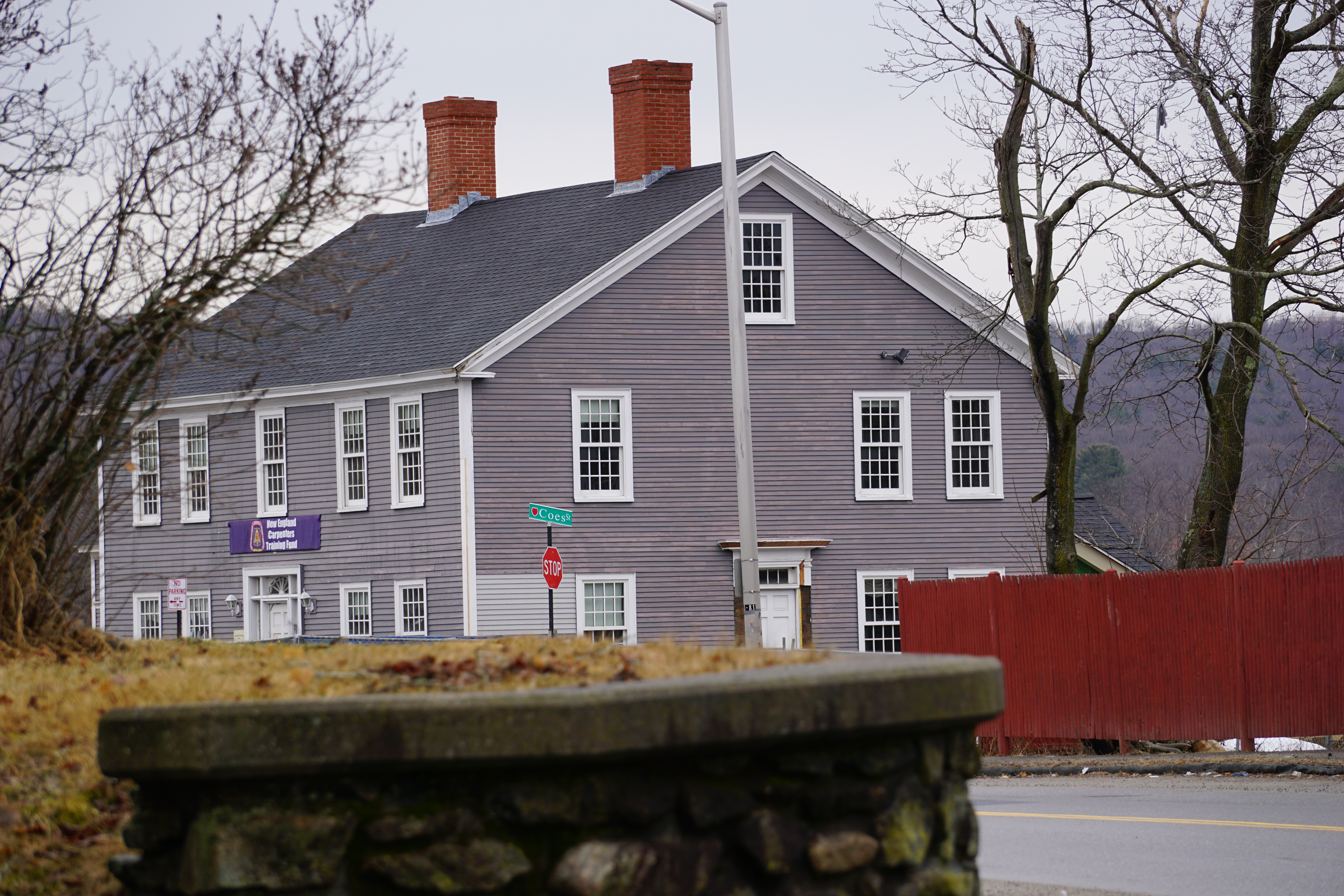

- Location within Massachusetts Location within the United States
- Location: 140 Mill St., Worcester, Massachusetts
- Built: 1812
- MPS: Worcester MRA
- NRHP reference No.: 80000479

Significant dates
- Added to NRHP: March 5, 1980
- Removed from NRHP: December 26, 2023

Stearns Tavern is a former tavern in Worcester, Massachusetts. The building is one of the best extant examples of vernacular Federal style architecture in the city. Its construction is dated to c. 1812 based on 19th-century historical sources, and it was suggested that its frame may be even older, based on analysis conducted during a 1974 move of the building. The building is a two-story timber-frame house, with a two-story ell on the northeast. The front door is a distinctive six-panel door, flanked by sidelights and topped by a fanlight. Originally located at 1030 Main Street, it was moved in 1974 to 651 Park Avenue and converted for use as a bank. Restoration done at the time exposed Federal style details that had been covered over in the intervening years. It was located at 651 Park Avenue in Worcester, Massachusetts from 1974 to 2016.

The building was listed on the National Register of Historic Places in 1980. In October 2016, the building was moved to 140 Mill Street in Worcester. It was removed from the National Register in 2023.

== See also ==
- National Register of Historic Places listings in southwestern Worcester, Massachusetts
- National Register of Historic Places listings in Worcester County, Massachusetts
