= James Schofield House =

Historic house in Massachusetts, United States

- U.S. National Register of Historic Places
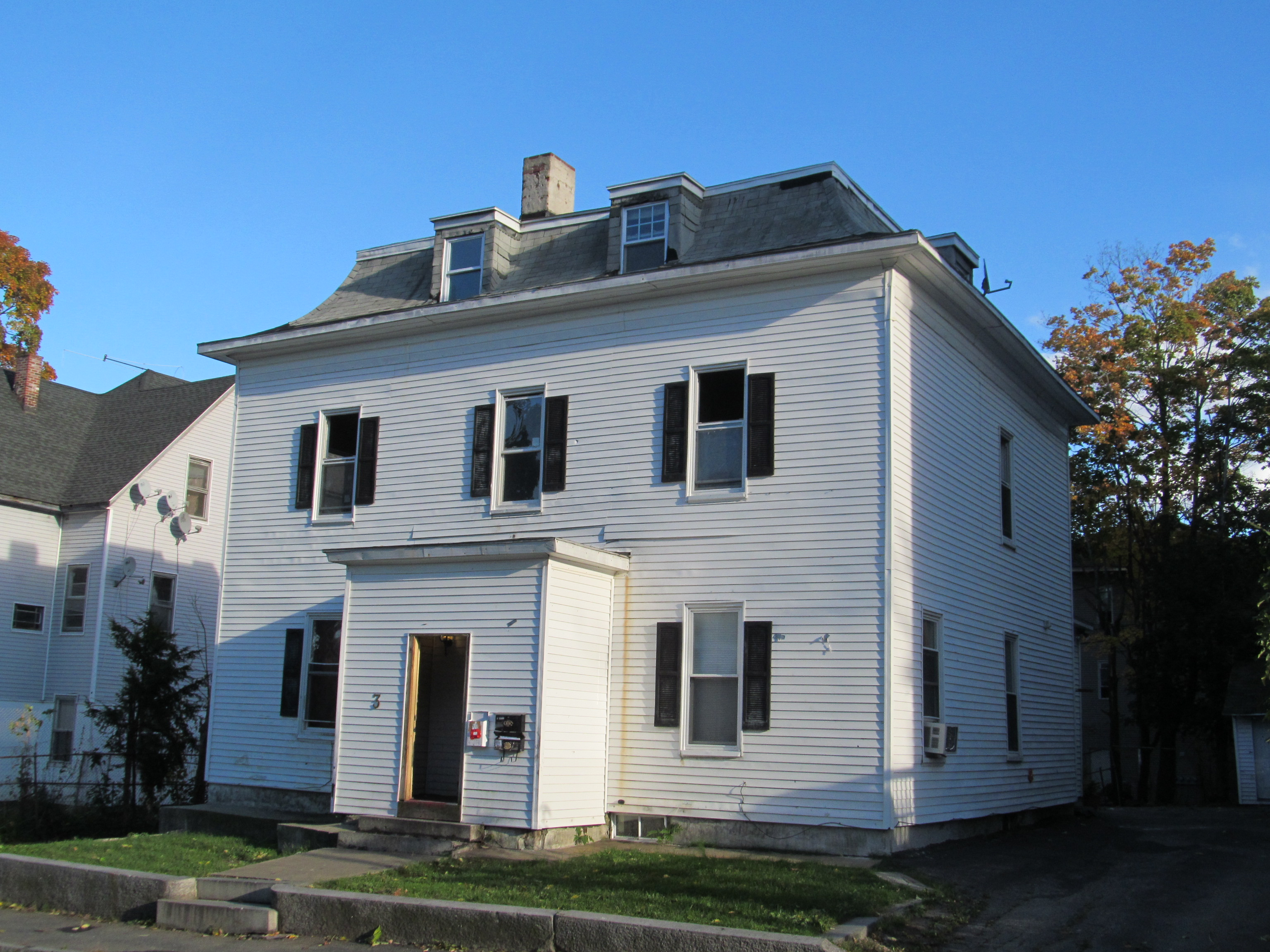
- 3 Mount Pleasant Street

- Location within Massachusetts Location within the United States
- Location: 3 Mt. Pleasant St., Worcester, Massachusetts
- Coordinates: 42°15′14″N 71°48′45″W
- Built: 1860
- Architectural style: Second Empire
- MPS: Worcester MRA
- NRHP reference No.: 80000634
- Added to NRHP: March 05, 1980

The James Schofield House is a historic Second Empire house at 3 Mt. Pleasant Street in Worcester, Massachusetts. It was built sometime before 1860, making it an early example of the style. It is a basically square structure, 2.5 stories high. At the time of its listing on the National Register of Historic Places in 1980, it featured an entry porch with turned pillars, and quoins on the corners of the house, but these have been removed or covered over by subsequent replacement of the siding (see photo).

== See also ==
- National Register of Historic Places listings in southwestern Worcester, Massachusetts
- National Register of Historic Places listings in Worcester County, Massachusetts
