= Edward Stone Three-Decker =

- U.S. National Register of Historic Places
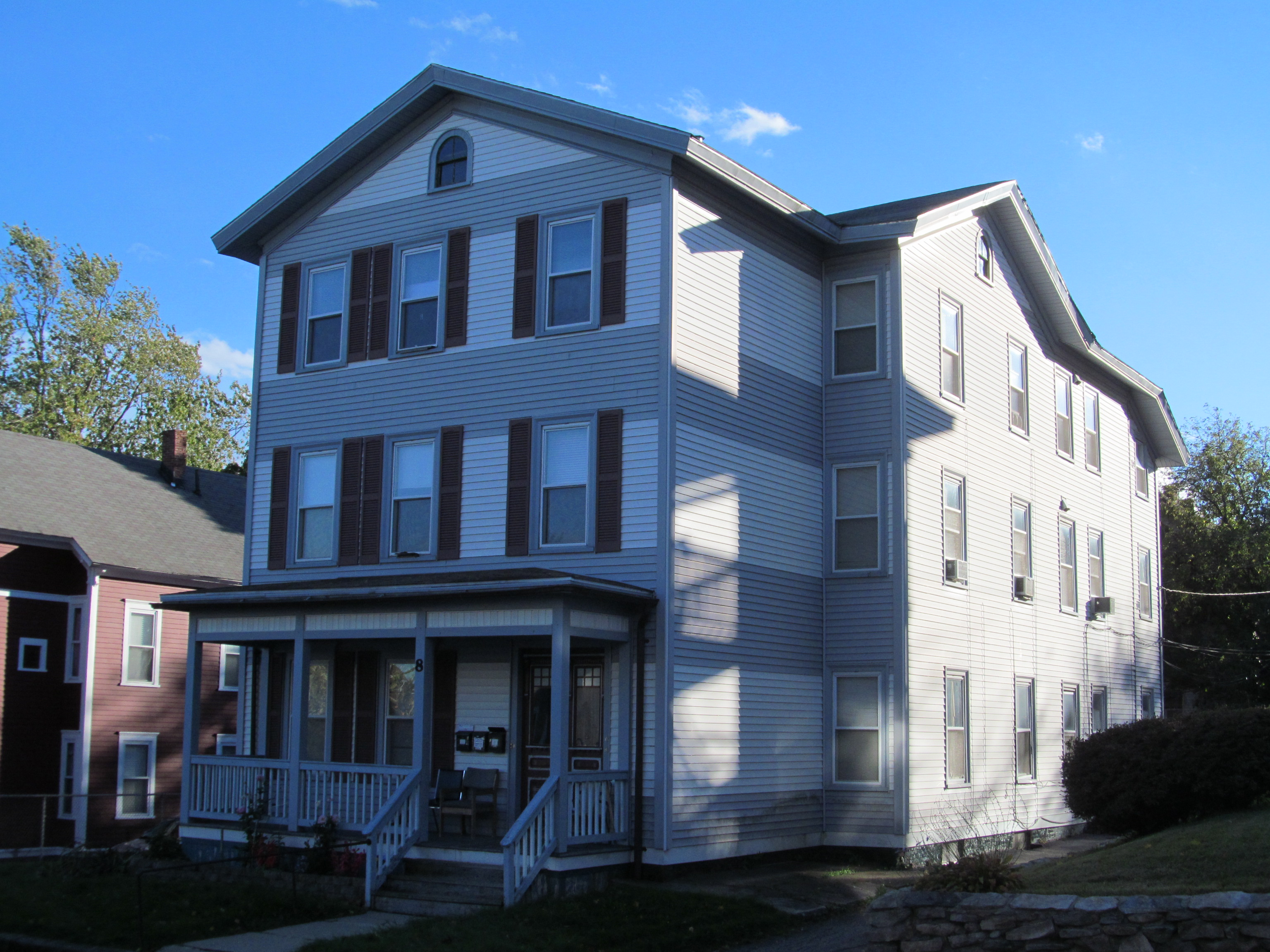

- Location within Massachusetts Location within the United States
- Location: 8 Wyman St., Worcester, Massachusetts
- Coordinates: 42°15′1″N 71°49′14″W
- Built: 1888
- Architectural style: Stick/Eastlake
- MPS: Worcester Three-Deckers TR
- NRHP reference No.: 89002450
- Added to NRHP: February 9, 1990

The Edward Stone Three-Decker is a historic triple decker house in Worcester, Massachusetts. Built in 1888, during an early phase of development in the area, it originally housed workers at nearby manufacturers, and later housed office workers who went downtown by streetcar. The house was highlighted for its Stick style architectural decorations when it was listed on the National Register of Historic Places in 1990, including elements in the gable end and on the porch. Many of these details have been lost or covered over as a result of subsequent exterior siding work (see photo), although round-arch windows in the gable end survive.

== See also ==
- National Register of Historic Places listings in southwestern Worcester, Massachusetts
- National Register of Historic Places listings in Worcester County, Massachusetts
