= Worcester Market Building =

- U.S. National Register of Historic Places
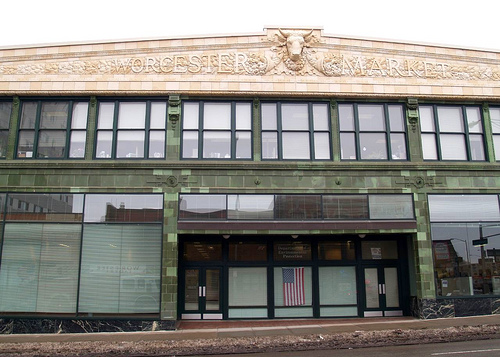

- Location within Massachusetts Location within the United States
- Location: Worcester, Massachusetts
- Coordinates: 42°15′34″N 71°48′18″W
- Built: 1914
- Architect: Oreste Ziroli
- MPS: Worcester MRA
- NRHP reference No.: 80000612
- Added to NRHP: March 5, 1980

The Worcester Market Building is a historic commercial building at 627 Main Street in Worcester, Massachusetts. When it was built in 1914, it was believed to be the largest grocery supply building in the nation. It was built for Fayette Asyril Amidon, who had founded the Worcester Market in 1894 after establishing a similar enterprise in Providence, Rhode Island. The building was designed by Oreste Ziroli, an Italian immigrant who worked as a draftsman for the building's builder, J. W. Bishop. The exterior of the building is terracotta that has been decorated with medallions on agricultural themes.

The market was designed with modern (for the period) ideas of efficiency. The main floor, covering 25,000 square feet (2,300 m^{2}), was devoted to retail space, and was designed to comfortably handle 4,500 customers. The basement and second floor were storage space, arranged so that supplies were located near their retail points on the main floor. These areas were connected to the main floor by elevators, eliminating the need for delivery vehicles to move in customer aisles.

The building was listed on the National Register of Historic Places in 1980.

== See also ==
- National Register of Historic Places listings in southwestern Worcester, Massachusetts
- National Register of Historic Places listings in Worcester County, Massachusetts
