= Andrew McCarron Three-Decker =

- U.S. National Register of Historic Places
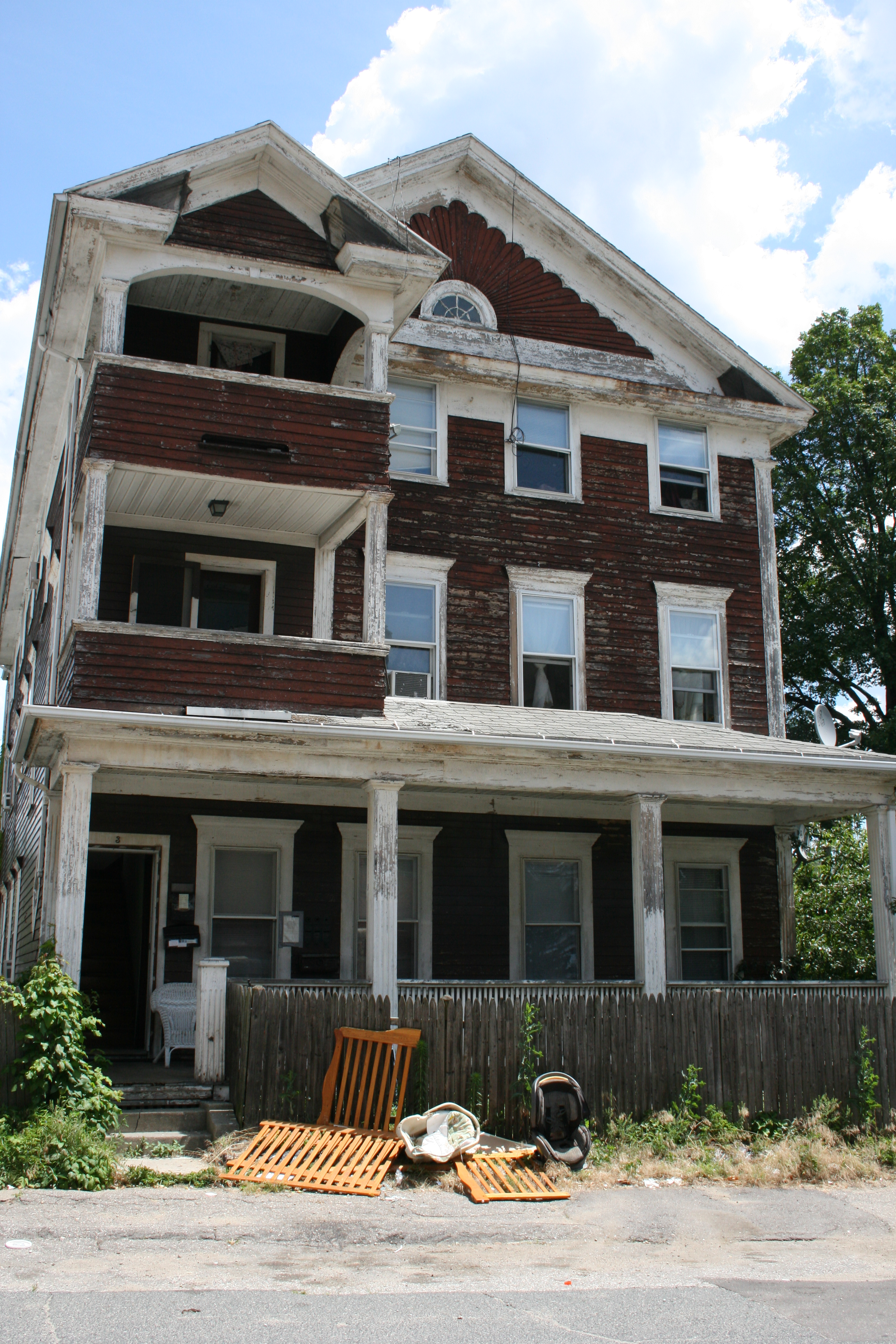

- Location within Massachusetts Location within the United States
- Location: 3 Pitt St., Worcester, Massachusetts
- Coordinates: 42°14′41″N 71°48′23″W
- Built: 1918
- Architectural style: Colonial Revival
- MPS: Worcester Three-Deckers TR
- NRHP reference No.: 89002442
- Added to NRHP: February 9, 1990

The Andrew McCarron Three-Decker is a historic triple-decker house in Worcester, Massachusetts. Built c. 1918, it is a well-preserved example of a Colonial Revival triple-decker, and rare for its relatively large size and proportioning. It follows a standard side hall plan, but is four bays wide instead of the more usual three, and has no side jogs (protruding bays on the side elevation). It has a three-story porch structure that projects significantly from the front facade. It is supported by fluted square columns and is topped by a pedimented gable.

The house was listed on the National Register of Historic Places in 1990.

== See also ==
- National Register of Historic Places listings in southwestern Worcester, Massachusetts
- National Register of Historic Places listings in Worcester County, Massachusetts
