= Clara Simpson Three-Decker =

Historic house in Worcester, Massachusetts, US

- U.S. National Register of Historic Places
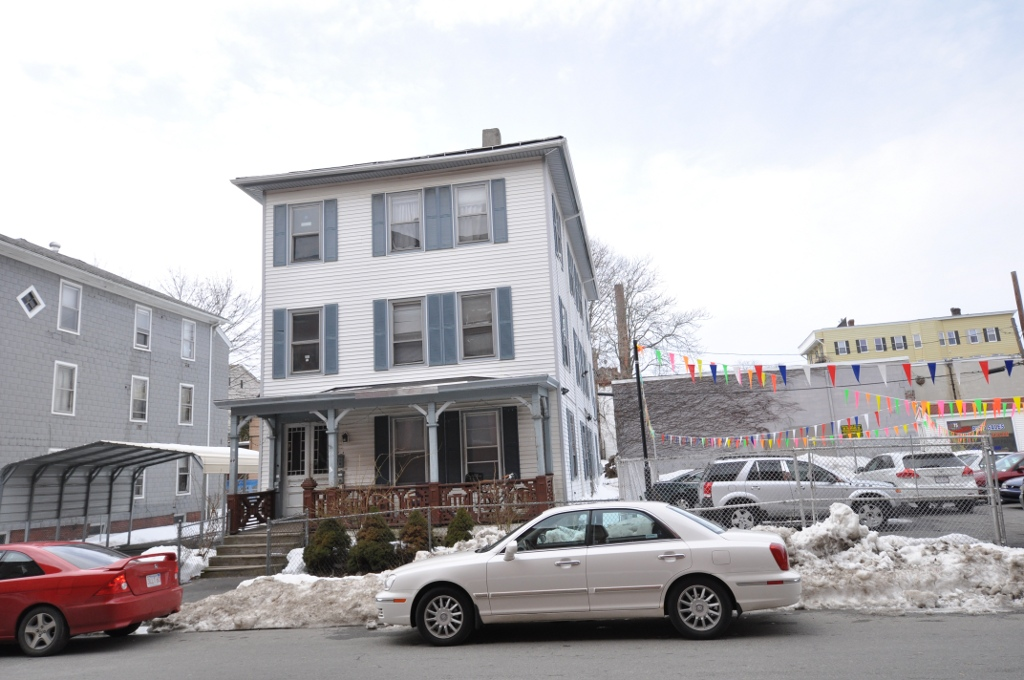

- Location within Massachusetts Location within the United States
- Location: 69 Piedmont St., Worcester, Massachusetts
- Coordinates: 42°15′36″N 71°48′46″W
- Built: 1888
- Architectural style: Italianate
- MPS: Worcester Three-Deckers TR
- NRHP reference No.: 89002440
- Added to NRHP: February 9, 1990

The Clara Simpson Three-Decker is a historic triple decker house in Worcester, Massachusetts. It is one of the older triple deckers in the Piedmont section of the city, built c. 1888. It follows a typical side hall plan, and has a jog on the side wall. It has a hip roof, which hangs over the house in typical Italianate fashion, with decorative brackets. The single story front porch extends the width of the house, and is supported by turned columns with heavy decorative brackets.

The house was listed on the National Register of Historic Places in 1990.

== See also ==
- National Register of Historic Places listings in southwestern Worcester, Massachusetts
- National Register of Historic Places listings in Worcester County, Massachusetts
