= May Street Historic District =

Historic district in Massachusetts, United States

- U.S. National Register of Historic Places
- U.S. Historic district
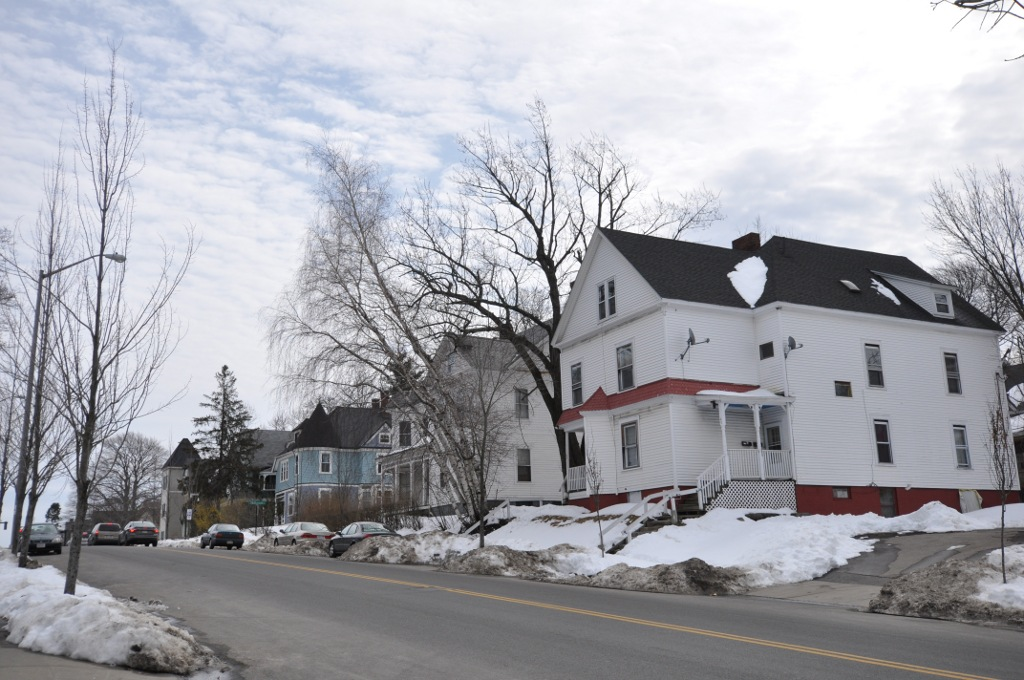
- Odd numbered houses in the district

- Location within Massachusetts Location within the United States
- Location: Properties from 29 to 46 May St., Worcester, Massachusetts
- Coordinates: 42°15′54″N 71°49′11″W
- Built: 1867
- Architect: Barker & Nourse, et al.
- Architectural style: Second Empire, Gothic, Queen Anne
- MPS: Worcester MRA
- NRHP reference No.: 80000622
- Added to NRHP: March 05, 1980

The May Street Historic District of Worcester, Massachusetts, encompasses a well-preserved collection of mid-19th century residences that are predominantly Queen Anne in their styling. The district, which was listed on the National Register of Historic Places in 1980, extends along May Street from Florence Street to just beyond Woodland Street, including houses numbered from 29 to 56 May Street.

Although May Street was laid out early in the 19th century, it was not developed in any significant way before the 1880s. Although there are older houses along the street, the oldest in this district is the Second Empire house built c. 1867 at 30 May Street, after lot lines had been drawn on maps of the period. The only other Second Empire house, at 33 May Street, was built c. 1873 and significantly restyled c. 1891 with Queen Anne details. The other early buildings were Victorian Gothic houses at 32 and 34 May Street, built in the late 1870s, and a third at number 29, built c. 1880. Most of the remaining buildings were built between 1888 and 1896, with Queen Anne styling. The notable exceptions are a triple decker at 49 May Street, and Victorian cottages at 31 and 56 May Street, built c. 1882 and c. 1886 respectively.

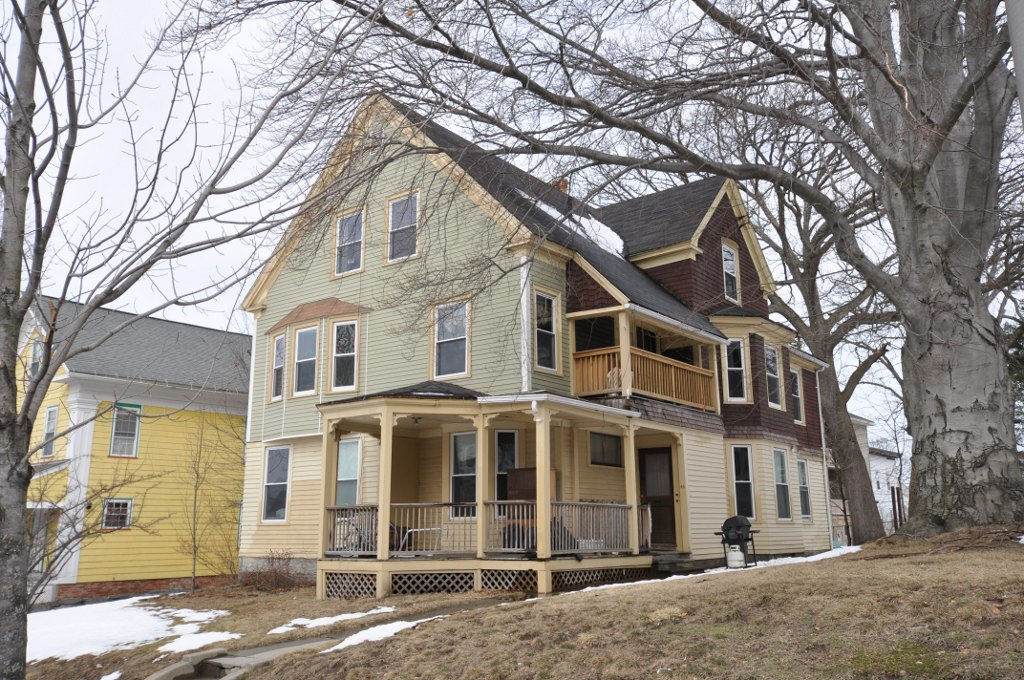
46 May Street

The neighborhood was during this period of development catering to businessmen and the owners of small manufacturing operations. Early owners included a jeweller, a lumber dealer, owner of a machinist shop, and a school principal. Two houses were owned by real estate dealers, and only one had an absentee owner.

== See also ==
- National Register of Historic Places listings in southwestern Worcester, Massachusetts
- National Register of Historic Places listings in Worcester County, Massachusetts
