= James O'Connor Three-Decker =

- U.S. National Register of Historic Places
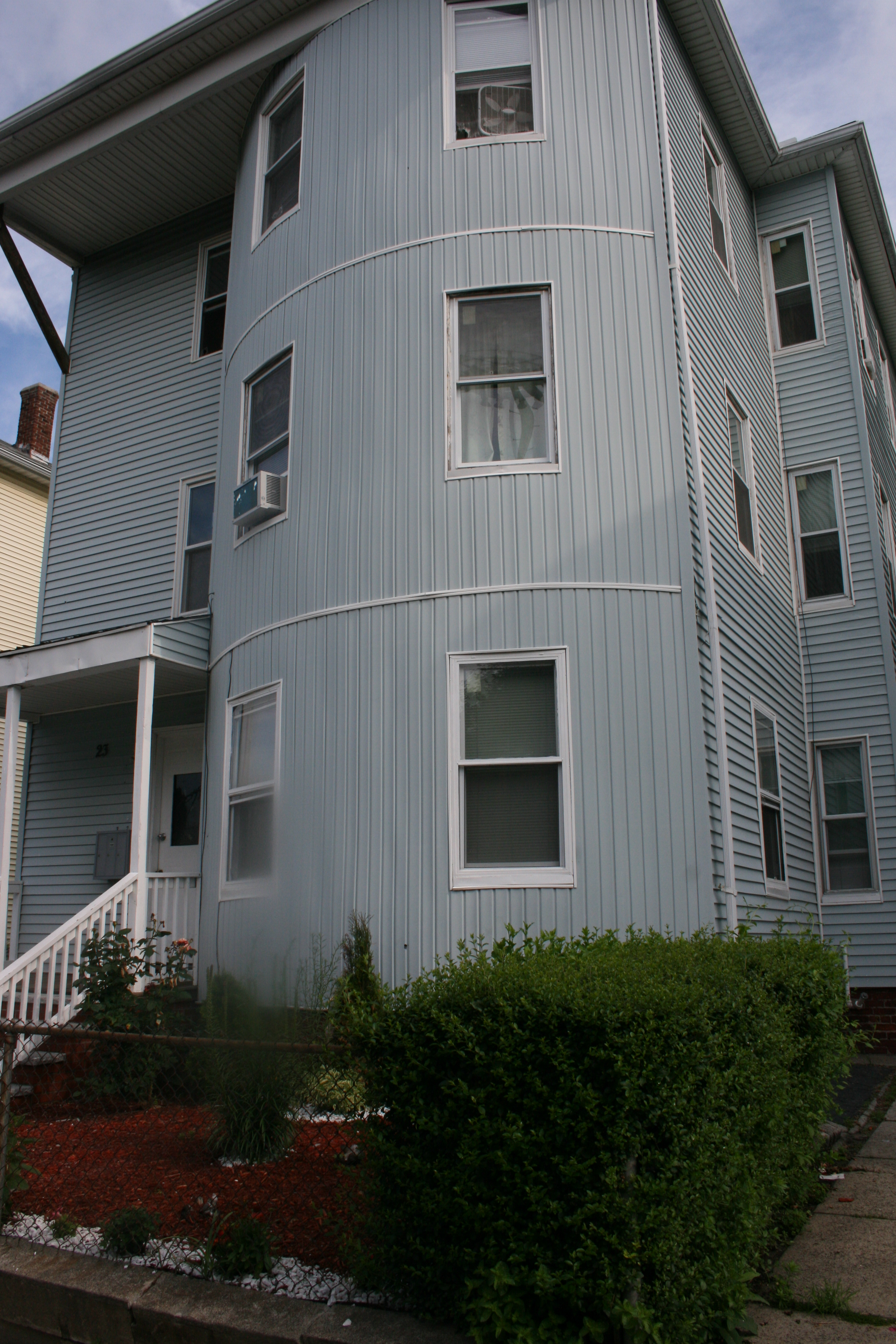

- Location within Massachusetts Location within the United States
- Location: 23 Endicott St., Worcester, Massachusetts
- Coordinates: 42°15′3″N 71°48′14″W
- Built: 1906
- Architectural style: Queen Anne
- MPS: Worcester Three-Deckers TR
- NRHP reference No.: 89002419
- Added to NRHP: February 9, 1990

The James O'Connor Three-Decker is a historic triple-decker in Worcester, Massachusetts. At time of its listing on the National Register of Historic Places in 1990, it was recognized as a well-preserved example of a wood-frame Queen Anne building, featuring a three-story porch with decorative turned wood balusters and porch supports, and wood siding with decorative bands of cut shingles. It was built about 1906, in what was then an ethnically mixed neighborhood; its early occupants were Irish and Swedish, with Poles and Lithuanians arriving later. Since its listing, the house has been resided and the porches removed.

== See also ==
- National Register of Historic Places listings in southwestern Worcester, Massachusetts
- National Register of Historic Places listings in Worcester County, Massachusetts
