= John B. McDermott Three-Decker =

- U.S. National Register of Historic Places
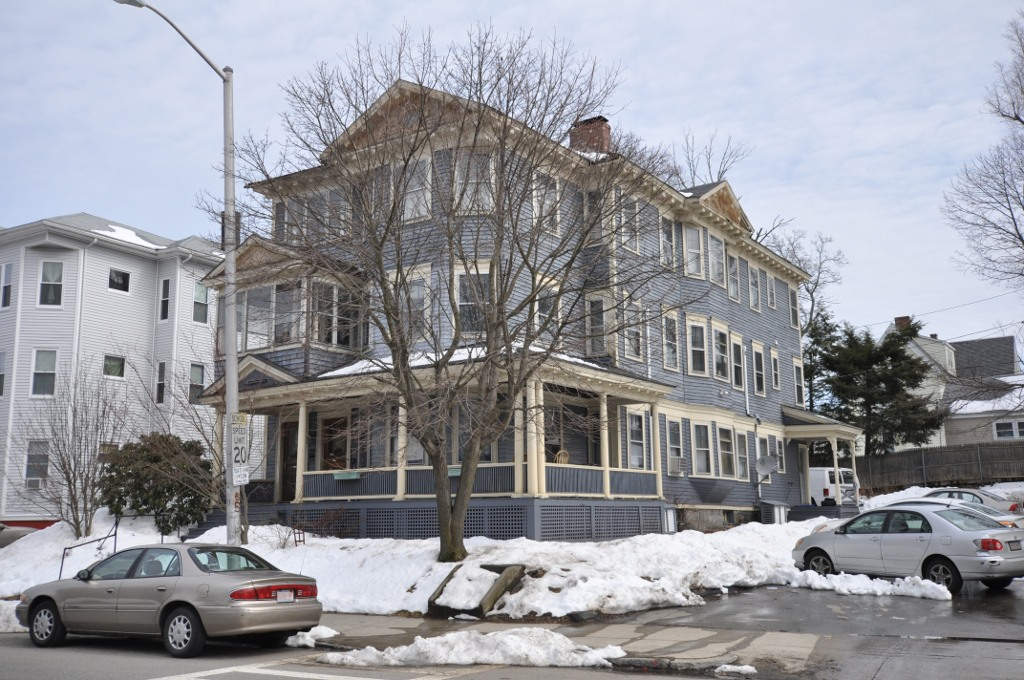

- Location within Massachusetts Location within the United States
- Location: 21 Freeland St., Worcester, Massachusetts
- Coordinates: 42°14′47″N 71°49′30″W
- Built: 1910
- Architectural style: Colonial Revival
- MPS: Worcester Three-Deckers TR
- NRHP reference No.: 89002366
- Added to NRHP: February 9, 1990

The John B. McDermott Three-Decker is a historic triple decker in Worcester, Massachusetts. Built c. 1910, it is distinctive for its preservation, and the scale and profusion of its Colonial Revival details. It has a typical side hall plan with a side bay, and a hip roof that is unusual for the presence of pedimented gable sections. The cornice of the roofline is decorated with evenly spaced heavy brackets. The front entry is highlighted by a two-story gable-end pedimented porch, of which the first floor section wraps around to the right side of the building. The porch is supported by slender round columns, and its roof has bracketing similar to that of the main roof.

The building was listed on the National Register of Historic Places in 1990.

== See also ==
- National Register of Historic Places listings in southwestern Worcester, Massachusetts
- National Register of Historic Places listings in Worcester County, Massachusetts
