= Marion Battelle Three-Decker =

- U.S. National Register of Historic Places
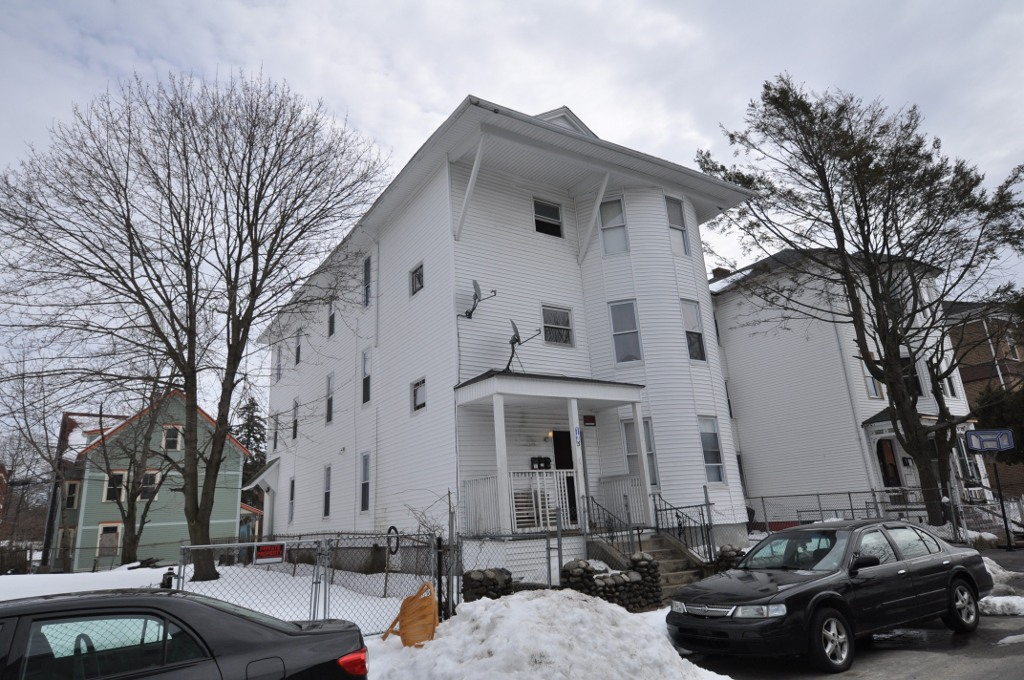

- Location within Massachusetts Location within the United States
- Location: 13 Preston St., Worcester, Massachusetts
- Coordinates: 42°15′31″N 71°48′41″W
- Built: 1896
- Architectural style: Queen Anne
- MPS: Worcester Three-Deckers TR
- NRHP reference No.: 89002429
- Added to NRHP: February 9, 1990

The Marion Battelle Three-Decker is a historic triple decker residence in Worcester, Massachusetts. It is a well-preserved and detailed example of a triple decker with Queen Anne styling. It is built with typical side hall plan, with a hip roof punctured by a gable dormer on the front facade. At the time of its listing on the National Register of Historic Places in 1990, it included detailing such as decoratively bracketed eave, and its turret-like front bay window was decorated with alternating bands of patterned shingles. Since then the exterior has been modified by the application of modern siding, and these details have been lost or obscured.

== See also ==
- National Register of Historic Places listings in southwestern Worcester, Massachusetts
- National Register of Historic Places listings in Worcester County, Massachusetts
