= Wesley Davis Three-Decker =

- U.S. National Register of Historic Places
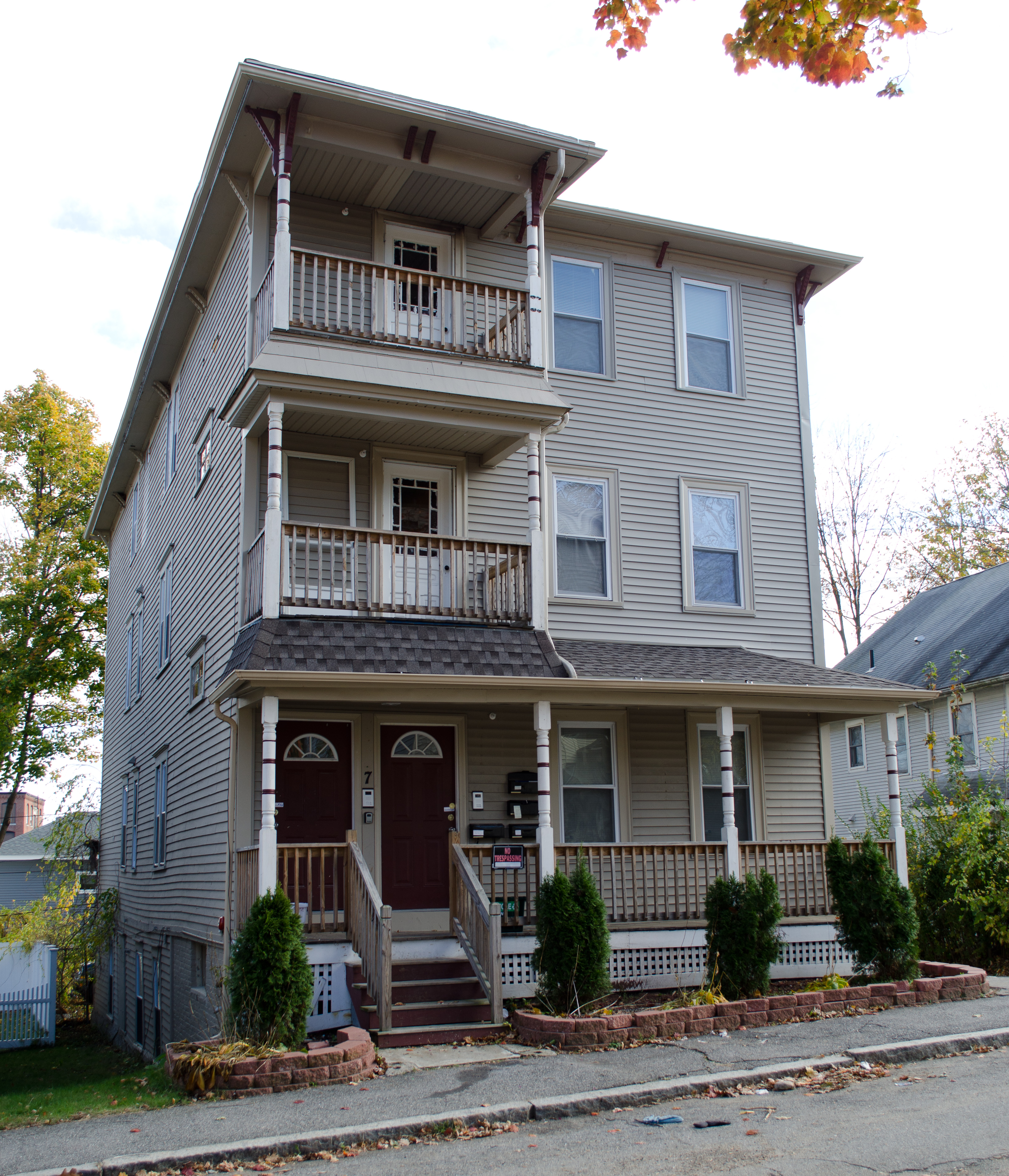

- Location within Massachusetts Location within the United States
- Location: 7 Albert St., Worcester, Massachusetts
- Coordinates: 42°14′54″N 71°49′14″W
- Built: 1890
- Architectural style: Stick/Eastlake
- MPS: Worcester Three-Deckers TR
- NRHP reference No.: 89002386
- Added to NRHP: February 9, 1990

The Wesley Davis Three-Decker is a historic triple decker house in Worcester, Massachusetts. It is a well-preserved example of a Stick-style building that was typical of the early phases of triple-decker construction in the city. This house was built c. 1890; its first documented owner was Wesley Davis, a doctor who did not live in the immediate area. Subsequent owners, like many of the building's occupants, were employed in and around local factories. The building follows a typical side hall plan, and is noted for its porch, which extends the full height of the building over one of the front bays, and has retained all of its original decorative woodwork.

The building was listed on the National Register of Historic Places in 1990.

== See also ==
- National Register of Historic Places listings in southwestern Worcester, Massachusetts
- National Register of Historic Places listings in Worcester County, Massachusetts
