= John Troupes Three-Decker =

- U.S. National Register of Historic Places
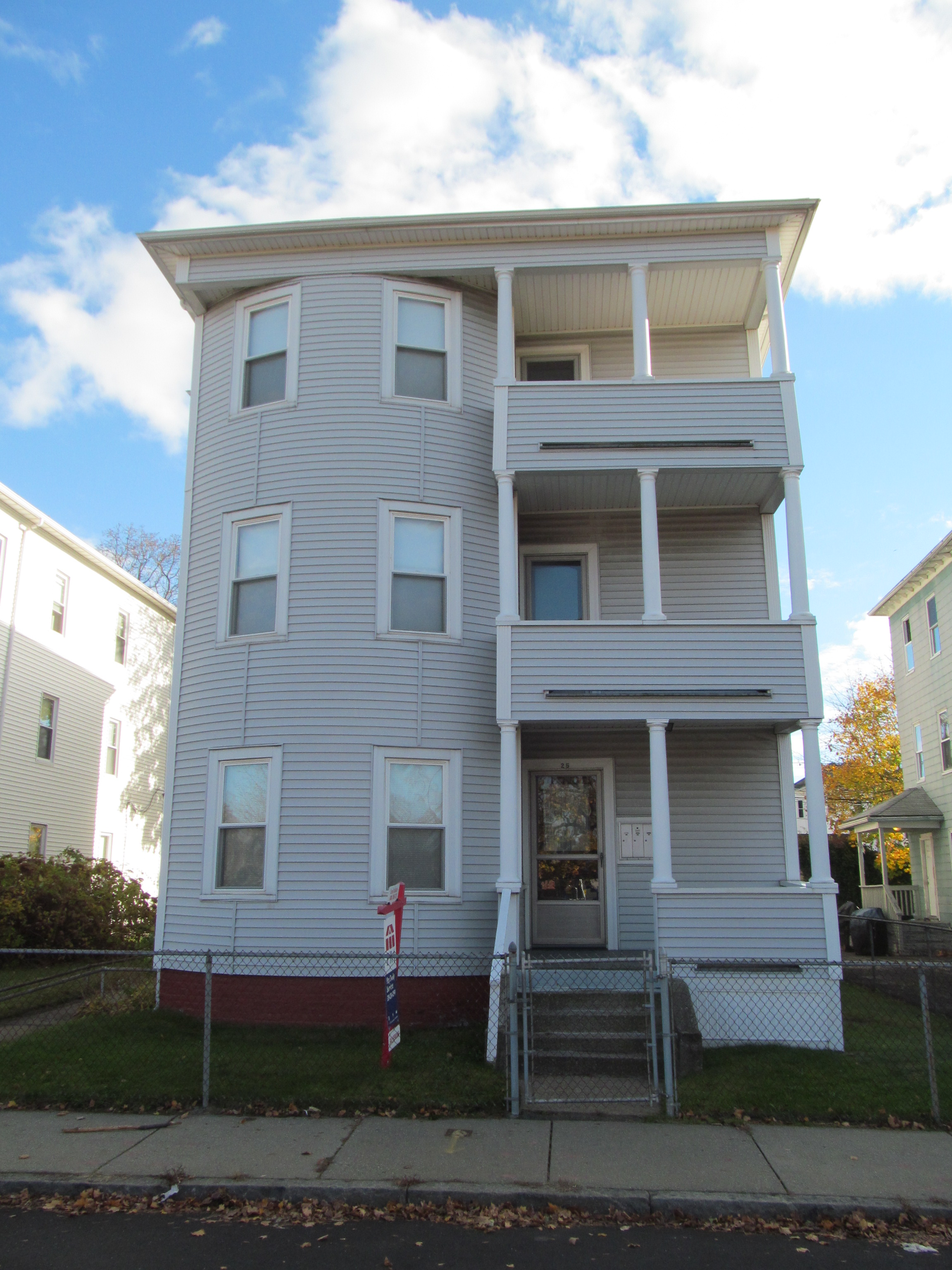

- Location within Massachusetts Location within the United States
- Location: 25 Canton St., Worcester, Massachusetts
- Coordinates: 42°14′55″N 71°48′12″W
- Built: 1918
- Architectural style: Colonial Revival
- MPS: Worcester Three-Deckers TR
- NRHP reference No.: 89002394
- Added to NRHP: February 9, 1990

The John Troupes Three-Decker is a historic triple decker house in Worcester, Massachusetts. When it was listed on the National Register of Historic Places in 1990, this 1918 building was noted for its well preserved Colonial Revival details, included bracketed cornices, wide bands of shingling between clapboarded sections, and porches supported by Doric columns. Subsequent residing and alteration of the exterior has removed or covered over most of these features (see photo).

== See also ==
- National Register of Historic Places listings in southwestern Worcester, Massachusetts
- National Register of Historic Places listings in Worcester County, Massachusetts
