= Elizabeth McCafferty Three-Decker =

- U.S. National Register of Historic Places
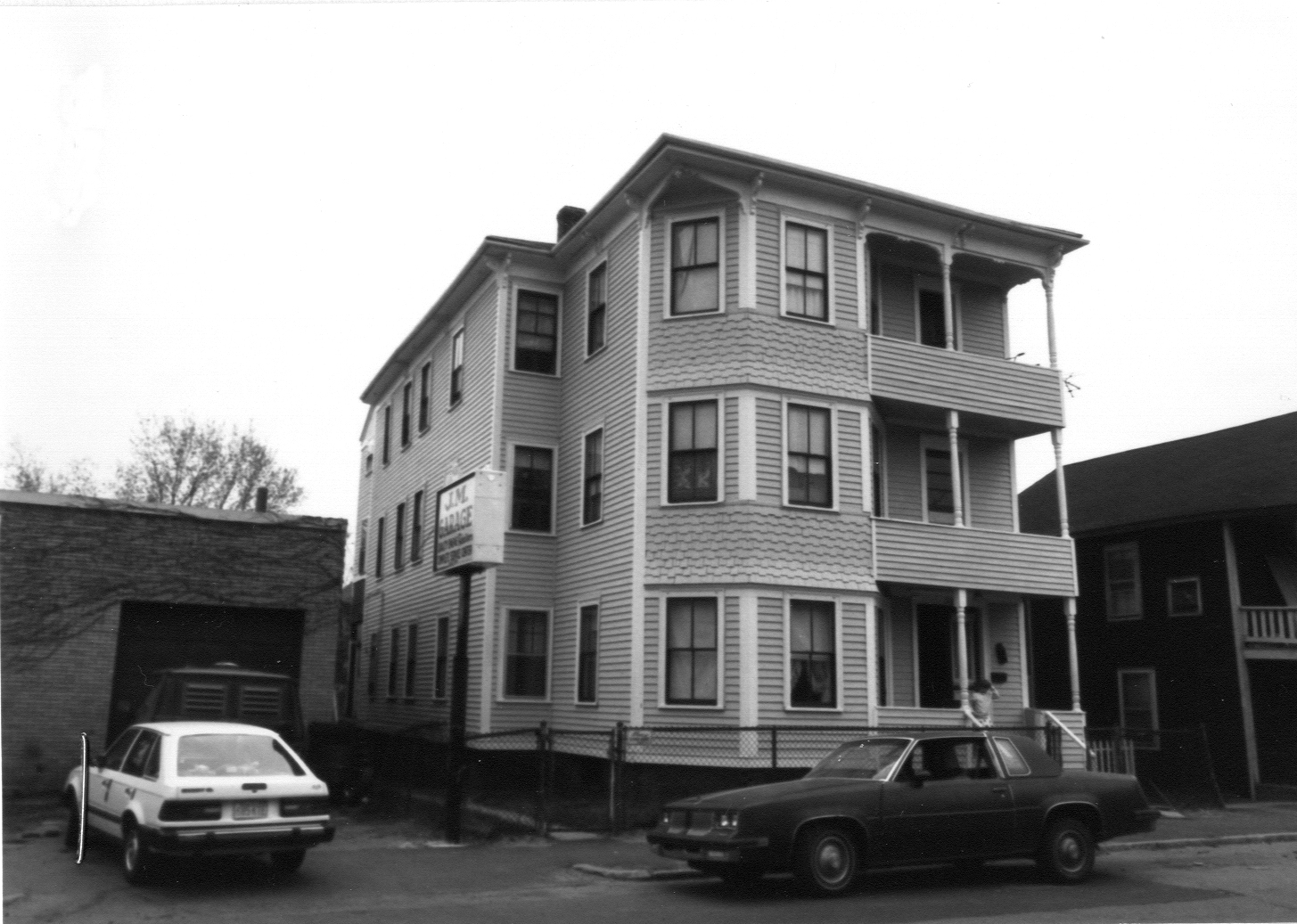
- c. 1989 photo

- Location within Massachusetts Location within the United States
- Location: 45 Canterbury St., Worcester, Massachusetts
- Coordinates: 42°14′57″N 71°48′49″W
- Built: 1894
- Architectural style: Queen Anne
- MPS: Worcester Three-Deckers TR
- NRHP reference No.: 89002395
- Added to NRHP: February 9, 1990

The Elizabeth McCafferty Three-Decker was a historic triple decker house in Worcester, Massachusetts. It was a fine example of a Queen Anne triple decker, with bands of decorative shingles and porch with turned posts. It was built in 1894, and was listed on the National Register of Historic Places in 1990. Its early tenants were primarily machinists and laborers, also including a policeman and teamster. The building has apparently been demolished; the lot is now occupied by an auto shop.

== See also ==
- National Register of Historic Places listings in southwestern Worcester, Massachusetts
- National Register of Historic Places listings in Worcester County, Massachusetts
