= Lucius Knowles House =

Historic house in Massachusetts, United States

- U.S. National Register of Historic Places
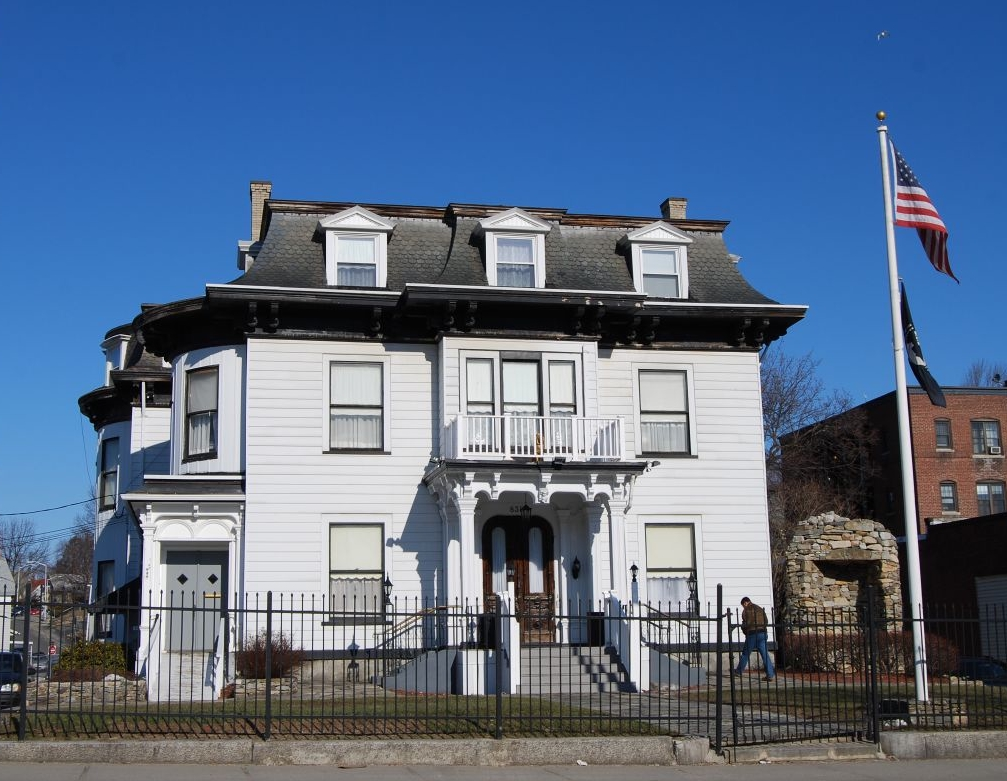

- Location within Massachusetts Location within the United States
- Location: 838 Main Street, Worcester, Massachusetts
- Coordinates: 42°15′18″N 71°48′53″W
- Built: 1870
- Architectural style: Italianate
- MPS: Worcester MRA
- NRHP reference No.: 80000628
- Added to NRHP: March 05, 1980

The Lucius Knowles House is a historic house located at 838 Main Street in Worcester, Massachusetts. It is locally significant as one of the city's best preserved Second Empire style buildings.

== Description and history ==
The three-story, wood-framed house was built around 1870 for industrialist Lucius Knowles, best known for his innovations in the manufacture of looms. It has a symmetrical front facade with mansard roof, and a front entry sheltered by an elaborately decorated porch. Another entry on the south side also had a decorated porch, now glassed in, above which there is an oriel window. A unique music room was added to the northeast corner of the house around 1880, to a design by Stephen Earle, which featured stained glass skylights (now covered over but still in place).

The house was listed on the National Register of Historic Places on March 5, 1980.

== See also ==
- National Register of Historic Places listings in southwestern Worcester, Massachusetts
- National Register of Historic Places listings in Worcester County, Massachusetts
