= Castle Street Row =

- U.S. National Register of Historic Places
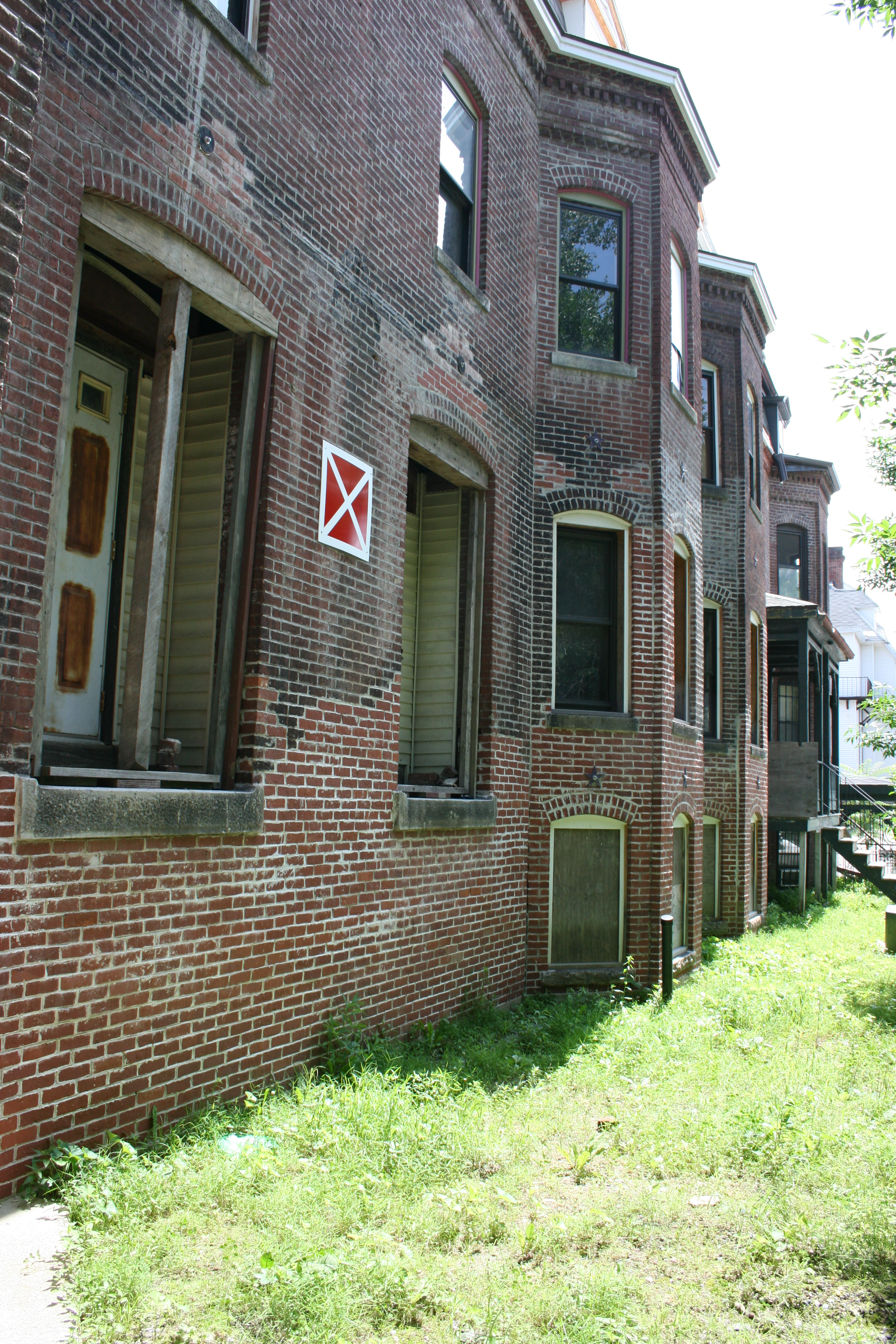

- Location within Massachusetts Location within the United States
- Location: 4-18 Castle St., Worcester, Massachusetts
- Coordinates: 42°15′24″N 71°48′45″W
- Built: 1873
- Architect: Gates, Larkin
- Architectural style: Italianate
- MPS: Worcester MRA
- NRHP reference No.: 80000625
- Added to NRHP: March 05, 1980

Castle Street Row is a historic rowhouse block at 4–18 Castle Street in Worcester, Massachusetts. Built c. 1873 by Worcester industrialist and developer Eli Thayer, the row of eight units is the largest collection of rowhouse units remaining in the city from a somewhat larger number built around that time. The three-story brick buildings are Second Empire in style, with mansard roofs. Although they were designed as single-family homes, most of them had been subdivided by the late 1880s.

The rowhouse was listed on the National Register of Historic Places in 1980.

== See also ==
- National Register of Historic Places listings in southwestern Worcester, Massachusetts
- National Register of Historic Places listings in Worcester County, Massachusetts
