= Charles A. Hall Three-Decker =

- U.S. National Register of Historic Places
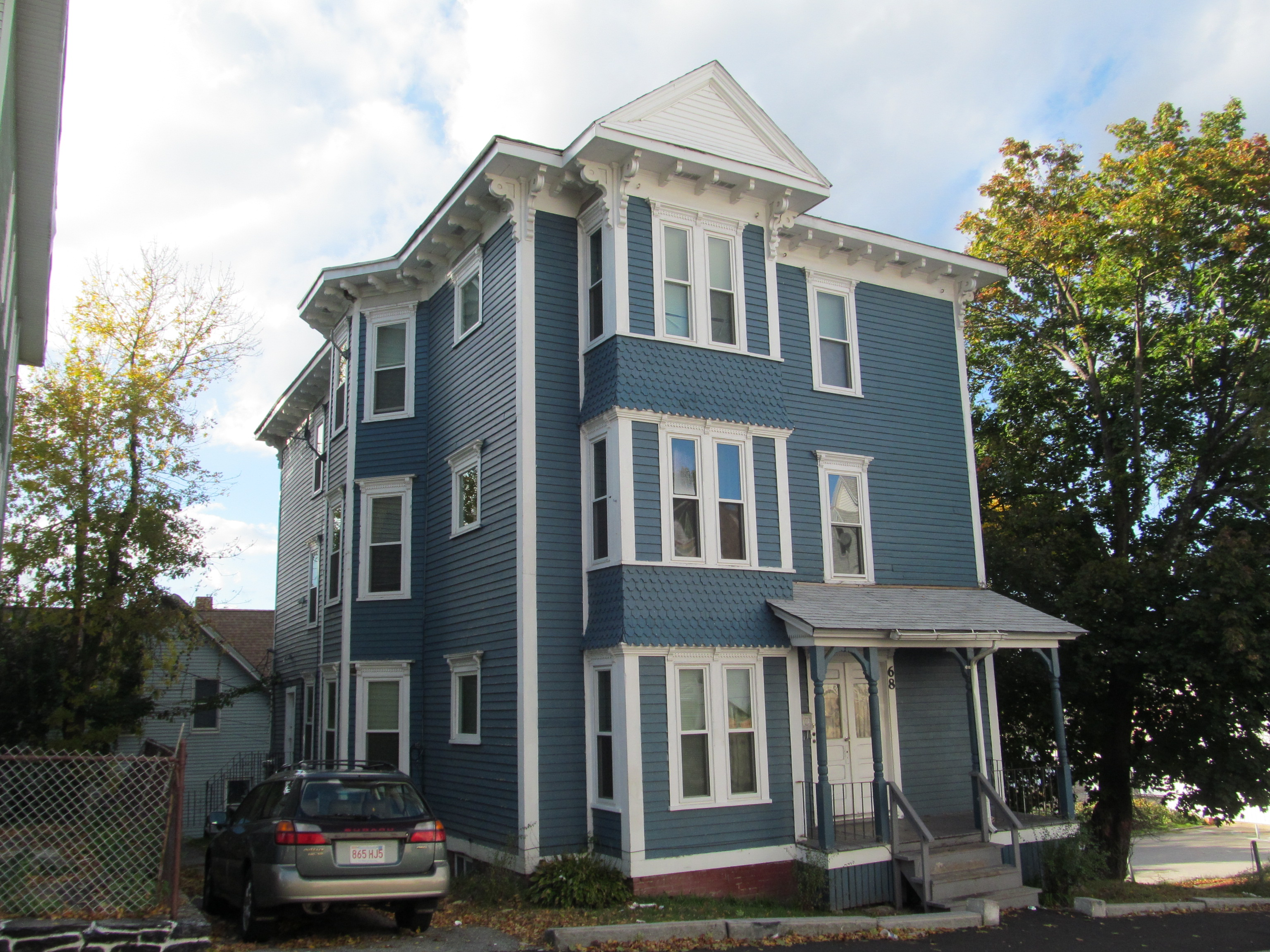
- 68 Mason Street

- Location within Massachusetts Location within the United States
- Location: 68 Mason St., Worcester, Massachusetts
- Coordinates: 42°15′26″N 71°49′16″W
- Built: 1896
- Architectural style: Queen Anne
- MPS: Worcester Three-Deckers TR
- NRHP reference No.: 89002423
- Added to NRHP: February 9, 1990

The Charles A. Hall Three-Decker is a historic triple-decker house in Worcester, Massachusetts. Built c. 1896, it is a well-preserved example of a triple-decker with Queen Anne styling. It follows a typical side hall plan, but has a squared front bay that is unusual for that part of the city. The bay is decorated with bands of cut shingles, and has window overhangs between floors. The bay is topped by a decorated projecting gable.

The building was listed on the National Register of Historic Places in 1990.

== See also ==
- National Register of Historic Places listings in southwestern Worcester, Massachusetts
- National Register of Historic Places listings in Worcester County, Massachusetts
