= Dale and Ethan Allen Streets Historic District =

Historic district in Massachusetts, United States

- U.S. National Register of Historic Places
- U.S. Historic district
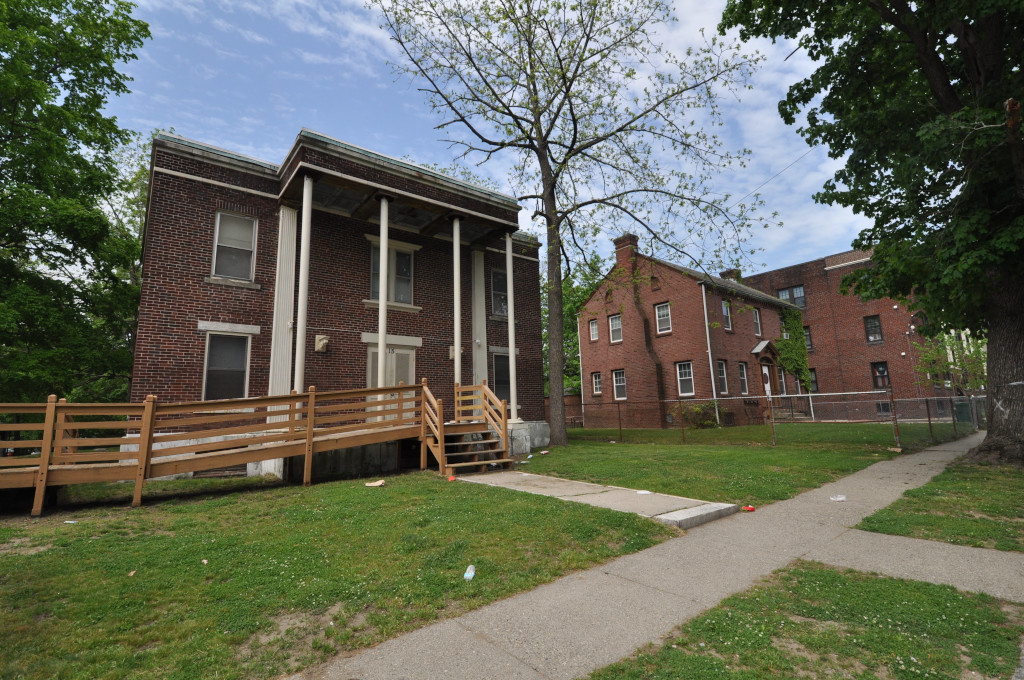
- Ethan Allen Street

- Location within Massachusetts Location within the United States
- Location: 18, 31-33, 21-23 & 11-15 Dale St./1 Allendale St., 22, 26, 25-27,15 &17 Ethan Allen St., Worcester, Massachusetts
- Coordinates: 42°14′54″N 71°49′14″W
- Built: 1910
- Architectural style: Colonial Revival
- NRHP reference No.: 100004700
- Added to NRHP: December 2, 2019

The Dale and Ethan Allen Streets Historic District of Worcester, Massachusetts encompasses a collection of apartment houses. Located along Dale, Ethan Allen, and Allendale Streets southwest of downtown Worcester, these buildings were built between 1910 and 1930, and are a stylistically diverse collection, including examples of Classical Revival, Colonial Revival, Tudor Revival, and Craftsman architecture. The district was listed on the National Register of Historic Places in 2019.

== Description and history ==
The historic district is located southwest of downtown Worcester, and includes nine buildings located on Dale, Ethan Allen, and Allendale Streets, residential side streets located between Chandler and Main Streets. Three occupy most of the east side of Dale Street, with one on the west side. The other buildings line the northern block of Ethan Allen Street, with the two streets joined by Allendale Street. All are masonry structures, with most three stories in height.

This area was originally the estate of gunmaker Ethan Allen, and it was subdivided by his heirs for development. The central portion of the estate, where his Greek Revival mansion had been located and these streets now run, was not developed until after the mansion was torn down, probably in the 1910s. Isadore Katz, a prominent real estate developer of the period, was responsible for two of the buildings on Dale Street, virtually identical buildings designed by Edwin T. Chapin. Morris Grossman, a Jewish immigrant, built the third building on the east side of Dale, with Chapin also credited with its design.

== See also ==
- National Register of Historic Places listings in southwestern Worcester, Massachusetts
- National Register of Historic Places listings in Worcester County, Massachusetts
