= Levi Flagg Three-Decker =

- U.S. National Register of Historic Places
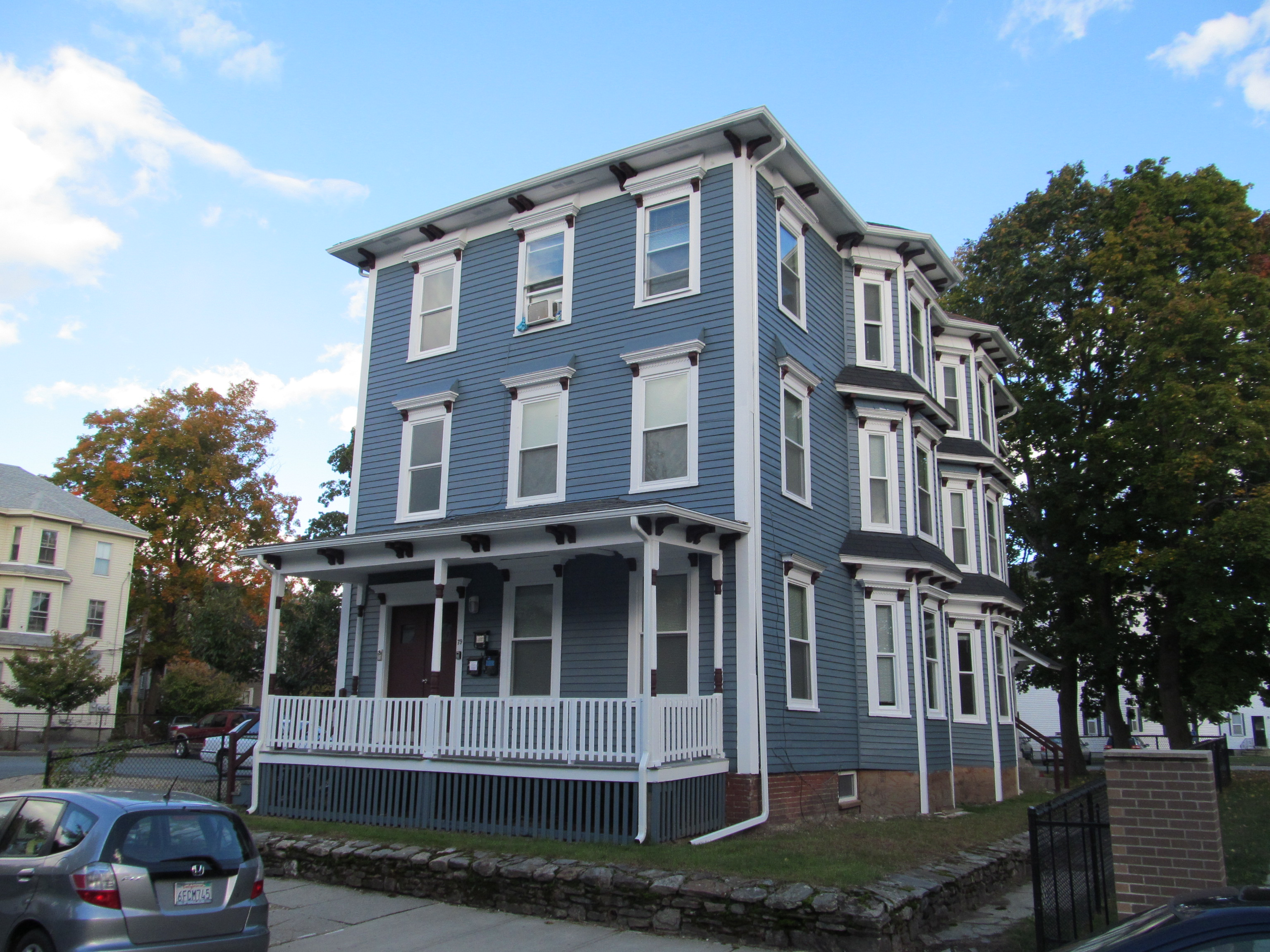

- Location within Massachusetts Location within the United States
- Location: 79 Florence St., Worcester, Massachusetts
- Coordinates: 42°15′2″N 71°49′35″W
- Built: 1901
- Architectural style: Stick/Eastlake, Queen Anne
- MPS: Worcester Three-Deckers TR
- NRHP reference No.: 89002362
- Added to NRHP: February 9, 1990

The Levi Flagg Three-Decker is a historic triple decker house in Worcester, Massachusetts. It is a well-preserved representative of the development of the neighborhood, and is architecturally distinctive for a rare combination (in a triple decker) of Queen Anne and Stick Style elements. The house was built c. 1901, and its first documented owner was Levi Flagg, a real estate agent who owned a number of properties throughout the city. The building follows a typical side-hall plan, but it has two sidewall bays that extend the full height of the building. The roof has deep eaves which are studded by pairs of decorative brackets. The main facade has a first-floor porch with Stick Style characteristics, including turned posts and decorative brackets matching those in the eaves.

The building was listed on the National Register of Historic Places in 1990.

== See also ==
- National Register of Historic Places listings in southwestern Worcester, Massachusetts
- National Register of Historic Places listings in Worcester County, Massachusetts
