= Hammond Organ Reed Factory =

- U.S. National Register of Historic Places
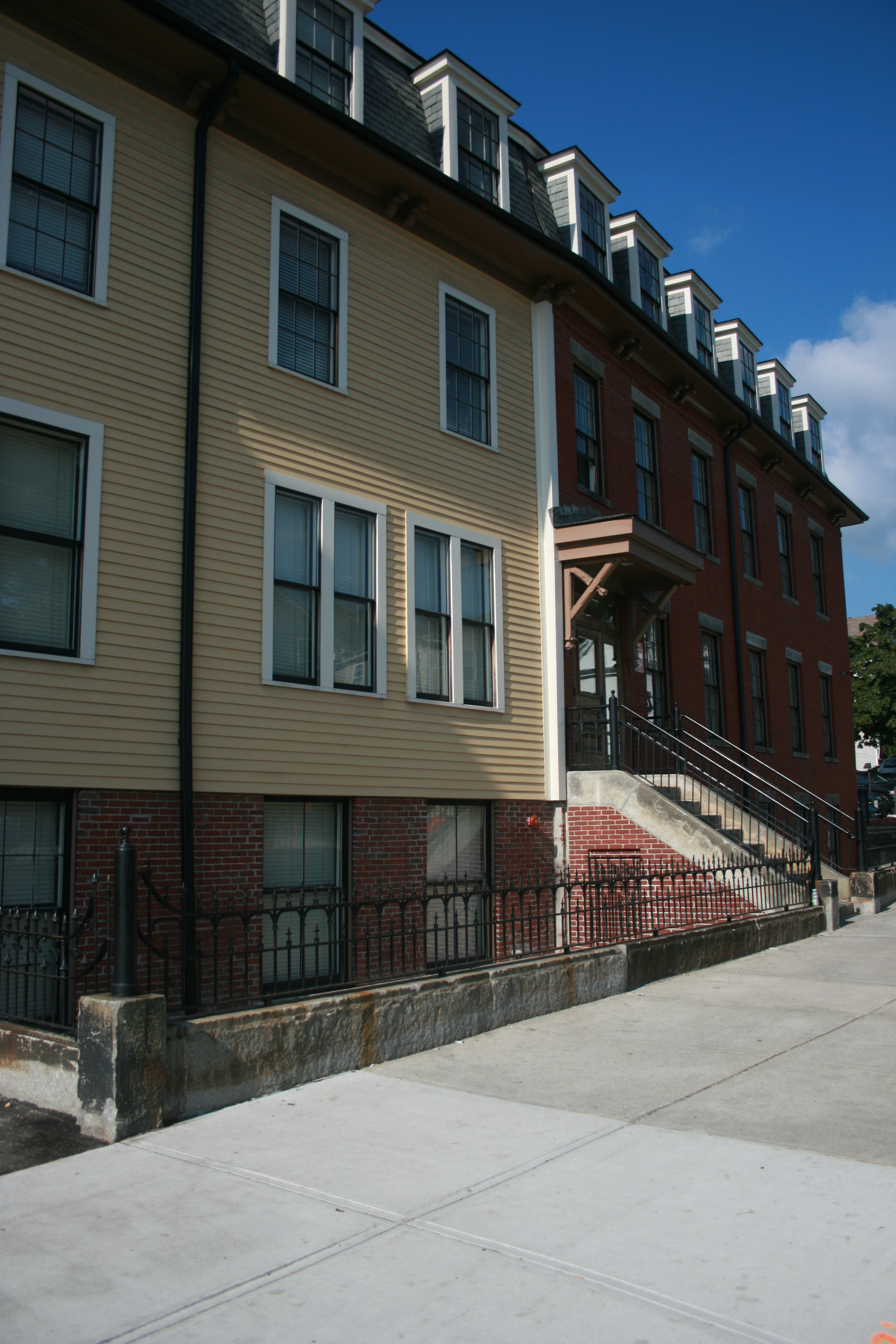

- Location within Massachusetts Location within the United States
- Location: 9 May St., Worcester, Massachusetts
- Coordinates: 42°15′18″N 71°48′57″W
- Built: 1868
- Architectural style: Second Empire
- MPS: Worcester MRA
- NRHP reference No.: 80000632
- Added to NRHP: March 05, 1980

The Hammond Organ Reed Factory is a historic former factory building at 9 May Street in Worcester, Massachusetts. Built in 1868 and enlarged in 1886, it is one of the city's few surviving Second Empire factory buildings. It was listed on the National Register of Historic Places in 1980. In 2007–2009, the building was restored and converted for use as affordable housing.

== Description and history ==
The former Hammond Organ Reed Factory is located southwest of downtown Worcester, at the southeastern corner of May and Silver Streets. It consists of a series of connected structures, some brick and some wood-frame, extending on a roughly north–south axis. The original structure is at the northern end, facing May Street; it is a 2 1/2-story brick structure, with a high basement and a full third floor under its mansard roof. Its front facade is nine bays wide, asymmetrically arranged, with the original main entrance slightly off-center in the middle bay, accessed by a high stoop.

Andrew Hammond was an ironworker who came to Worcester in 1851, where he worked at, and eventually took over ownership of, the organ reed business of Edward Harrington and Augustus Rice. Hammond built the oldest portion of this factory in 1868, and added to it several times over the next two decades, until the building reached its present configuration in 1886, at which time it employed an estimated 200 workers. Hammond is believed to be the largest manufacturer of organ reeds between 1890 and the advent of World War I. After standing vacant and crime-ridden for many years, it was converted into affordable housing in 2007–09.

== See also ==
- National Register of Historic Places listings in southwestern Worcester, Massachusetts
- National Register of Historic Places listings in Worcester County, Massachusetts
