= Elliot Smith House =

Historic house in Massachusetts, United States

- U.S. National Register of Historic Places
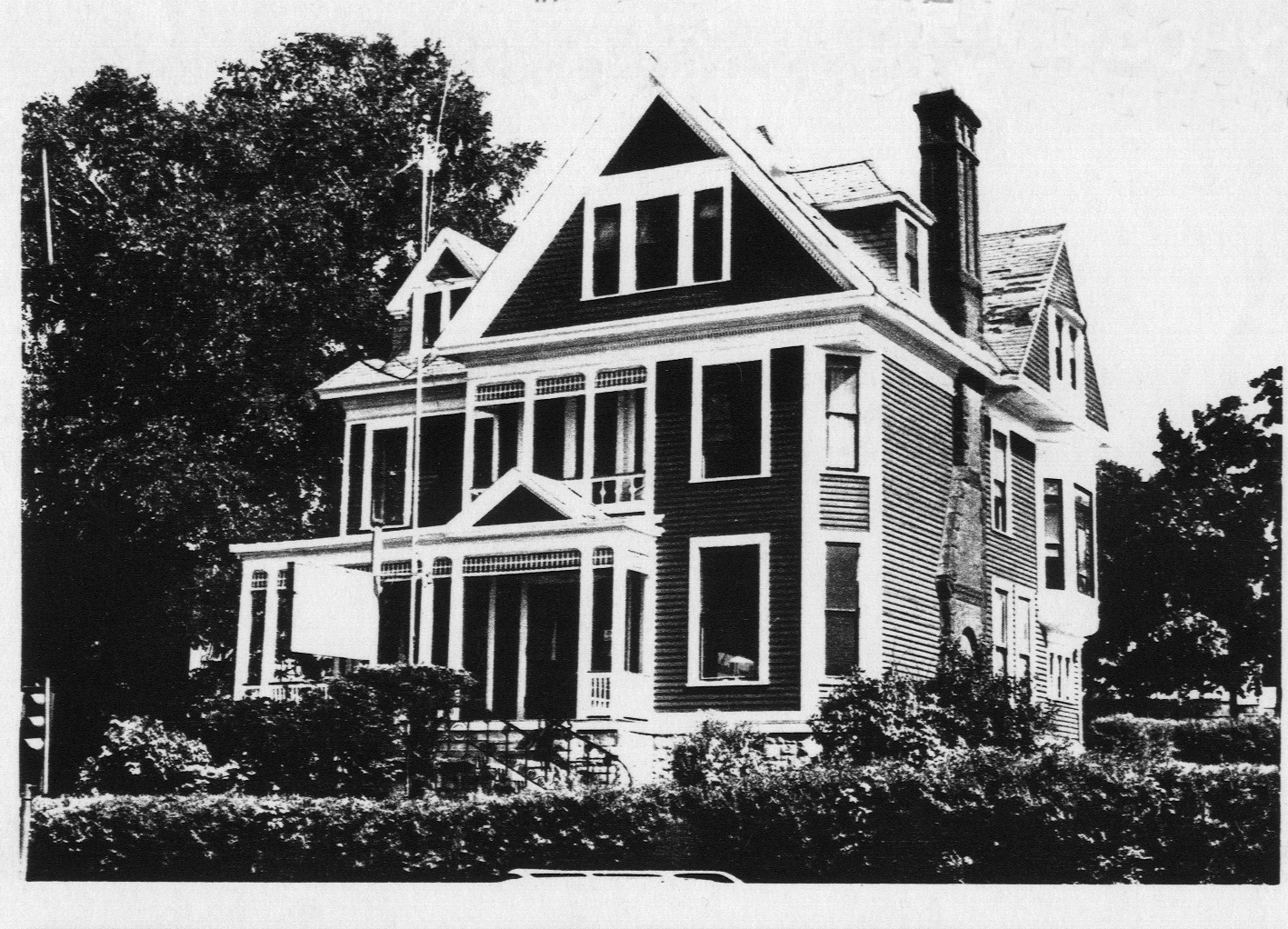
- c. 1977 photo

- Location within Massachusetts Location within the United States
- Location: 839 Main Street, Worcester, Massachusetts
- Coordinates: 42°15′15″N 71°48′53″W
- Built: 1889
- Architectural style: Queen Anne
- MPS: Worcester MRA
- NRHP reference No.: 80000629
- Added to NRHP: March 05, 1980

The Elliot Smith House was a historic house located at 839 Main Street in Worcester, Massachusetts. The house was listed on the National Register of Historic Places on March 5, 1980. It was demolished in 1982.

== Description and history ==
The 2 1/2-story asymmetrical wood-frame Queen Anne style house was built in 1889 for Elliot Smith, a local businessman who operated a wholesale grocery. Its porch featured elaborately turned posts and balusters, and the house was clad in wood shingles, including bands of decoratively cut shingles. There was an oriel stained glass window on the south wall. Smith lived in the house until his death in 1913. In 1945, the house was acquired by a veterans' organization, and eventually became VFW post.

== See also ==
- National Register of Historic Places listings in southwestern Worcester, Massachusetts
- National Register of Historic Places listings in Worcester County, Massachusetts
