= Harry B. Ingraham Three-Decker =

- U.S. National Register of Historic Places
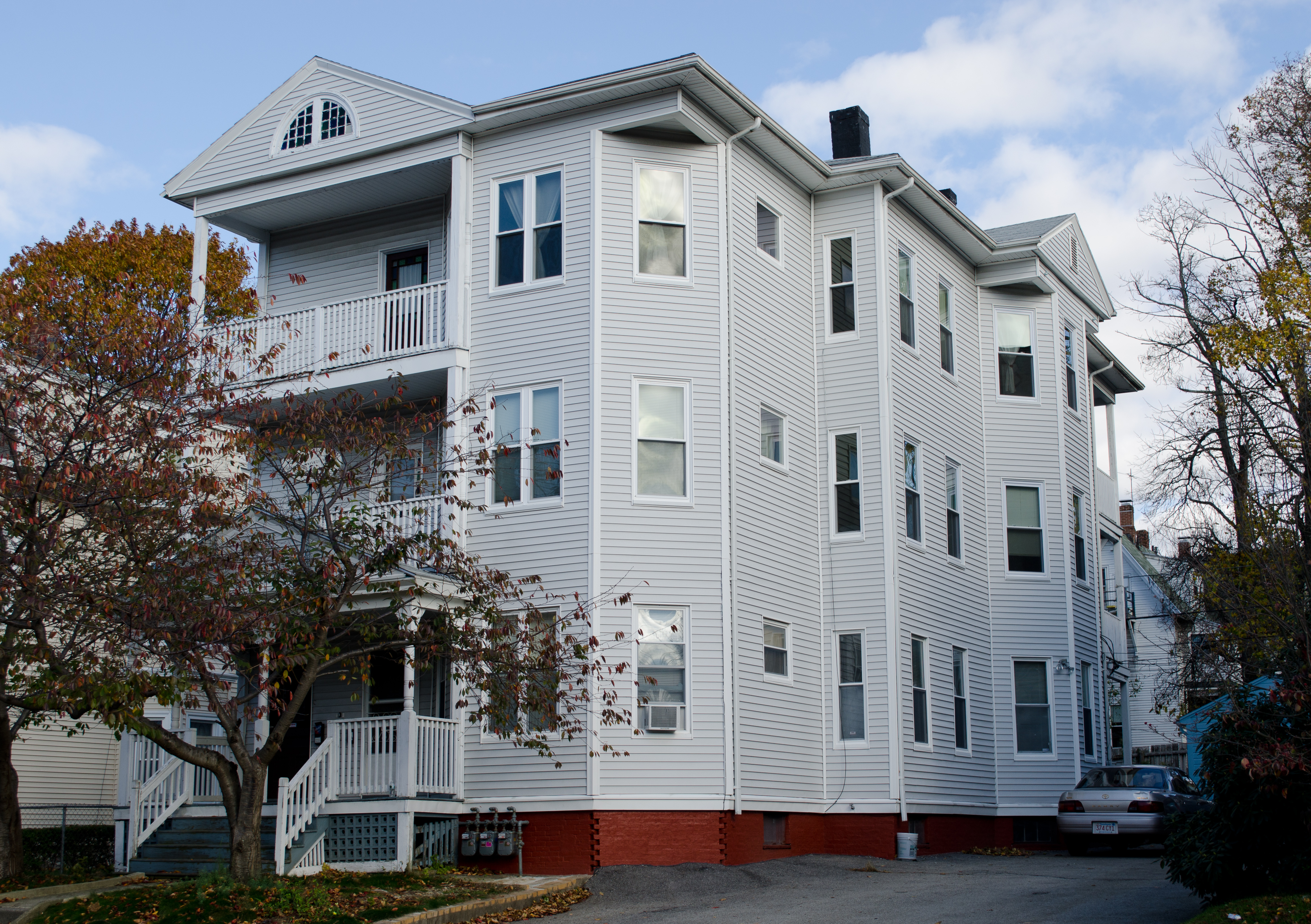

- Location within Massachusetts Location within the United States
- Location: 19 Freeland St., Worcester, Massachusetts
- Coordinates: 42°14′48″N 71°49′30″W
- Built: 1892
- Architectural style: Queen Anne
- MPS: Worcester Three-Deckers TR
- NRHP reference No.: 89002363
- Added to NRHP: February 9, 1990

The Harry B. Ingraham Three-Decker is a historic triple decker house in Worcester, Massachusetts. It was built c. 1892 for Harry B. Ingraham, an absentee owner based in Boston. When listed on the National Register of Historic Places in 1990, the building was specially noted for its fine Queen Anne styling, but much of this has been lost due to later exterior refinishing (see photo from 2012). The porches on the front were supported by narrow turned posts with decorative brackets, and third floor porch had a Stick Style frieze across its top. The house was sheathed in wood clapboard, although there were bands of cut shingles providing a decorative touch. The house has since been sided in synthetic sided, and its upper porch details have been replaced by simpler designs.

The building was listed on the National Register of Historic Places in 1990.

== See also ==
- National Register of Historic Places listings in southwestern Worcester, Massachusetts
- National Register of Historic Places listings in Worcester County, Massachusetts
