= National Register of Historic Places listings in southwestern Worcester, Massachusetts =

There are 291 properties and historic districts on the National Register of Historic Places in Worcester, Massachusetts. Of these, 82 are west of I-190 and the north-south section of I-290 and south of Massachusetts Route 122, and are listed below. One listing, the Blackstone Canal Historic District, overlaps into other parts of the city. Another listing has been removed.

The locations of National Register properties and districts (at least for all showing latitude and longitude coordinates below) may be seen in an online map by clicking on "Map of all coordinates".

This National Park Service list is complete through NPS recent listings posted August 28, 2026.

== Current listings ==
	Name on the Register	Image	Date listed	Location	Description
1	Adriatic Mills	Adriatic Mills	March 5, 1980 (#80000483)	3-35 Armory St. 42°14′48″N 71°48′49″W	Demolished.
2	Catherine Ahern Three-Decker	Catherine Ahern Three-Decker	February 9, 1990 (#89002392)	215 Cambridge St. 42°14′37″N 71°49′20″W	
3	Ashworth and Jones Factory	Ashworth and Jones Factory	March 5, 1980 (#80000489)	1511 Main St. 42°14′23″N 71°51′41″W	
4	Aurora Hotel	Aurora Hotel	April 28, 1988 (#88000429)	652-660 Main St. 42°15′34″N 71°48′20″W	
5	Marion Battelle Three-Decker	Marion Battelle Three-Decker	February 9, 1990 (#89002429)	13 Preston St. 42°15′31″N 71°48′41″W	
6	Beacon Street Firehouse	Beacon Street Firehouse	March 5, 1980 (#80000538)	108 Beacon St. 42°15′16″N 71°48′34″W	
7	Beaver Street Historic District	Beaver Street Historic District	February 9, 1990 (#89002377)	31-39 Beaver St. 42°14′58″N 71°49′38″W	
8	Blackstone Canal Historic District	Blackstone Canal Historic District	August 15, 1995 (#95001004)	Sites along the historic route of the Blackstone Canal in Massachusetts; 42°08′39″N 71°40′36″W	Listing extends into other parts of Worcester, as well as Sutton, Grafton, Millbury, Northbridge, Uxbridge, Millville, Blackstone; the Rhode Island section of the canal is the subject of a separate listing (#91001536).
9	Boynton and Windsor	Boynton and Windsor	March 5, 1980 (#80000540)	718, 720 Main St. 42°15′28″N 71°48′32″W	
10	Brightside Apartments	Brightside Apartments	March 5, 1980 (#80000635)	2 King St. 42°15′20″N 71°48′50″W	
11	Cambridge Street Firehouse	Cambridge Street Firehouse	March 5, 1980 (#80000487)	534 Cambridge St. 42°14′38″N 71°48′34″W	
12	Cambridge Street School	Cambridge Street School	March 5, 1980 (#80000484)	510 Cambridge St. 42°14′37″N 71°48′38″W	
13	Castle Street Row	Castle Street Row	March 5, 1980 (#80000625)	4-18 Castle St.; 20-24 Castle St. 42°15′24″N 71°48′45″W	
14	Clark University	Clark University	March 5, 1980 (#80000547)	Clark University campus 42°15′03″N 71°49′23″W	This listing includes the historic core buildings of Clark, bounded by Maywood, Woodland, and Main Streets.
15	Corner Lunch	Corner Lunch	November 15, 2000 (#00001286)	133 Lamartine St. 42°15′10″N 71°48′20″W	
16	Thomas Crabtree Three-Decker	Thomas Crabtree Three-Decker	February 9, 1990 (#89002383)	22 Haynes St. 42°14′41″N 71°49′46″W	
17	Elias Crawford House	Elias Crawford House	March 5, 1980 (#80000552)	3 Norwood St. 42°15′10″N 71°49′09″W	
18	Crystal Street Historic District	Crystal Street Historic District	February 9, 1990 (#89002379)	30-34 Crystal St. 42°14′47″N 71°49′24″W	
19	Dale and Ethan Allen Streets Historic District	Dale and Ethan Allen Streets Historic District	December 2, 2019 (#100004700)	18, 31-33, 21-23 & 11-15 Dale St./1 Allendale St., 22, 26, 25-27,15 &17 Ethan Allen St. 42°14′54″N 71°49′14″W	
20	Wesley Davis Three-Decker	Wesley Davis Three-Decker	February 9, 1990 (#89002386)	7 Albert St. 42°14′54″N 71°49′14″W	
21	Dowley-Taylor House	Dowley-Taylor House	March 5, 1980 (#80000627)	770 Main St. 42°15′24″N 71°48′40″W	
22	Downing Street School	Downing Street School	March 5, 1980 (#80000621)	92 Downing St. 42°15′14″N 71°49′29″W	
23	Emmanuel Baptist	Emmanuel Baptist	March 5, 1980 (#80000536)	717 Main St. 42°15′27″N 71°48′29″W	
24	Fairlawn	Fairlawn	March 5, 1980 (#80000594)	189 May St. 42°15′37″N 71°50′10″W	
25	C.H. Fitch House	C.H. Fitch House	March 5, 1980 (#80000631)	15 Oread St. 42°15′20″N 71°48′41″W	
26	Levi Flagg Three-Decker	Levi Flagg Three-Decker	February 9, 1990 (#89002362)	79 Florence St. 42°15′02″N 71°49′35″W	
27	Freeland Street School	Freeland Street School	March 5, 1980 (#80000482)	12 Freeland St. 42°14′49″N 71°49′33″W	
28	Hadley Furniture Company Building	Hadley Furniture Company Building	March 1, 2011 (#11000068)	651-659 Main St. 42°15′34″N 71°48′19″W	
29	Charles A. Hall Three-Decker	Charles A. Hall Three-Decker	February 9, 1990 (#89002423)	68 Mason St. 42°15′26″N 71°49′16″W	
30	Hammond Organ Factory	Hammond Organ Factory	March 5, 1980 (#80000632)	9 May St. 42°15′18″N 71°48′57″W	
31	Samuel Hirst Three-Decker	Samuel Hirst Three-Decker	February 9, 1990 (#89002420)	90 Lovell St. 42°15′10″N 71°49′58″W	
32	Holy Name of Jesus Complex	Holy Name of Jesus Complex	June 9, 1988 (#88000721)	Illinois St. 42°14′45″N 71°49′16″W	
33	Hope Cemetery	Hope Cemetery	December 22, 1997 (#97001560)	119 Webster St. 42°14′10″N 71°49′34″W	
34	Daniel Hunt Three-Decker	Daniel Hunt Three-Decker	February 9, 1990 (#89002451)	9 Wyman St. 42°15′02″N 71°49′14″W	
35	IOOF Building	IOOF Building	March 5, 1980 (#80000535)	674 Main St. 42°15′31″N 71°48′26″W	
36	Harry B. Ingraham Three-Decker	Harry B. Ingraham Three-Decker	February 9, 1990 (#89002363)	19 Freeland St. 42°14′48″N 71°49′30″W	
37	Junction Shop and Hermon Street District	Junction Shop and Hermon Street District	March 5, 1980 (#80000533)	Properties on Jackson, Hermon, and Beacon Sts. 42°15′22″N 71°48′28″W	Misspelled "Herman" in the National Register listing.
38	Lucius Knowles House	Lucius Knowles House	March 5, 1980 (#80000628)	838 Main St. 42°15′18″N 71°48′53″W	
39	John Legg House	John Legg House	March 5, 1980 (#80000623)	5 Claremont St. 42°15′14″N 71°49′03″W	
40	Thomas Lumb Three-Decker	Thomas Lumb Three-Decker	February 9, 1990 (#89002403)	80 Dewey St. 42°15′36″N 71°49′15″W	
41	Thomas Lumb Three-Decker	Thomas Lumb Three-Decker	February 9, 1990 (#89002448)	44 Winfield St. 42°15′36″N 71°49′17″W	
42	Main Street and Murray Avenue Historic District	Main Street and Murray Avenue Historic District	December 1, 2022 (#100008421)	718 and 720 Main St., 87 and 91 Murray Ave. 42°15′30″N 71°48′30″W	
43	John Mark Three-Decker	John Mark Three-Decker	February 9, 1990 (#89002435)	24 Sigel St. 42°15′06″N 71°48′10″W	
44	Masonic Temple	Masonic Temple	March 5, 1980 (#80000537)	Ionic Ave. 42°15′29″N 71°48′21″W	
45	May Street Historic District	May Street Historic District	March 5, 1980 (#80000622)	29-46 May St. 42°15′22″N 71°49′11″W	
46	Elizabeth McCafferty Three-Decker	Elizabeth McCafferty Three-Decker	February 9, 1990 (#89002395)	45 Canterbury St. 42°14′57″N 71°48′49″W	Building demolished. Now a cement block auto body shop on site.
47	Andrew McCarron Three-Decker	Andrew McCarron Three-Decker	February 9, 1990 (#89002442)	3 Pitt St. 42°14′41″N 71°48′23″W	
48	John B. McDermott Three-Decker	John B. McDermott Three-Decker	February 9, 1990 (#89002366)	21 Freeland St. 42°14′47″N 71°49′30″W	
49	Miss Worcester Diner	Miss Worcester Diner	November 21, 2003 (#03001178)	302 Southbridge St. 42°15′14″N 71°48′24″W	
50	S. D. Newton House	S. D. Newton House	March 5, 1980 (#09000142)	8 Sycamore St. 42°16′30″N 71°48′21″W	
51	Norcross Brothers Houses	Norcross Brothers Houses	March 5, 1980 (#80000624)	16, 18 Claremont St. 42°15′18″N 71°49′07″W	
52	James O'Connor Three-Decker	James O'Connor Three-Decker	February 9, 1990 (#89002419)	23 Endicott St. 42°15′03″N 71°48′14″W	
53	James O'Connor-John Trybowski Three-Decker	James O'Connor-John Trybowski Three-Decker	February 9, 1990 (#89002393)	21 Canton St. 42°14′56″N 71°48′10″W	
54	Pilgrim Congregational Church	Pilgrim Congregational Church	March 5, 1980 (#80000551)	909 Main St. 42°15′07″N 71°49′08″W	
55	Frank Reed Three-Decker	Frank Reed Three-Decker	February 9, 1990 (#89002422)	913, 915 Main St. 42°15′06″N 71°49′10″W	
56	Albert Ridyard Three-Decker	Albert Ridyard Three-Decker	February 9, 1990 (#89002431)	5 Mount Pleasant St. 42°15′14″N 71°48′46″W	
57	St. Marks	St. Marks	March 5, 1980 (#80000481)	Freeland St. 42°14′52″N 71°49′34″W	
58	St. Matthews	St. Matthews	March 5, 1980 (#80000485)	693 Southbridge St. 42°14′35″N 71°48′44″W	
59	St. Peters Catholic Church	St. Peters Catholic Church	March 5, 1980 (#80000548)	935 Main St. 42°14′35″N 71°48′44″W	
60	James Schofield House	James Schofield House	March 5, 1980 (#80000634)	3 Mt. Pleasant St. 42°15′14″N 71°48′45″W	
61	Moody Shattuck House	Moody Shattuck House	March 5, 1980 (#80000626)	768 Main St. 42°15′25″N 71°48′38″W	
62	Clara Simpson Three-Decker	Clara Simpson Three-Decker	February 9, 1990 (#89002440)	69 Piedmont St. 42°15′36″N 71°48′46″W	
63	Ellen M. Smith Three-Decker	Ellen M. Smith Three-Decker	February 9, 1990 (#89002409)	22 Kilby St. 42°15′02″N 71°48′58″W	House demolished and replaced with a modern duplex at site.
64	Elliot Smith House	Elliot Smith House	March 5, 1980 (#80000629)	839 Main St. 42°15′15″N 71°48′53″W	Building demolished. Empty lot.
65	South Unitarian	South Unitarian	March 5, 1980 (#80000550)	888 Main St. 42°15′11″N 71°49′05″W	
66	South Worcester Branch Library	South Worcester Branch Library	March 5, 1980 (#80000486)	705 Southbridge St. 42°14′33″N 71°48′45″W	
67	Southbridge-Sargent Manufacturing District	Southbridge-Sargent Manufacturing District	March 5, 1980 (#80000534)	Southbridge, Sargent, and Gold Sts. 42°15′15″N 71°48′23″W	
68	Edward Stark House	Edward Stark House	March 5, 1980 (#80000633)	21 Oread St. 42°15′18″N 71°48′39″W	
69	Daniel Stevens House	Daniel Stevens House	March 5, 1980 (#80000532)	7 Sycamore St. 42°15′28″N 71°48′25″W	
70	Edward Stone Three-Decker	Edward Stone Three-Decker	February 9, 1990 (#89002450)	8 Wyman St. 42°15′01″N 71°49′14″W	
71	J. R. Torrey Razor Co. and J. R. Torrey & Co. Manufacturing Facility	J. R. Torrey Razor Co. and J. R. Torrey & Co. Manufacturing Facility	May 20, 2024 (#100010339)	128 Chandler Street; 42°15′38″N 71°48′44″W	
72	John Troupes Three-Decker	John Troupes Three-Decker	February 9, 1990 (#89002394)	25 Canton St. 42°14′55″N 71°48′12″W	
73	The Vendome and the St. Ives	The Vendome and the St. Ives	February 9, 1990 (#89002331)	17-19 and 21-23 Chandler St. 42°15′33″N 71°48′19″W	
74	Webster Street Firehouse	Webster Street Firehouse	March 5, 1980 (#80000480)	40 Webster St. 42°14′38″N 71°50′00″W	
75	Wellington Street Apartment House District	Wellington Street Apartment House District	March 5, 1980 (#80000539)	Properties along Jacques Ave. and Wellington and Irving Sts. 42°15′35″N 71°48′34″W	
76	Franklin Wesson House	Franklin Wesson House	March 5, 1980 (#80000603)	8 Claremont St. 42°15′16″N 71°49′02″W	
77	Whittall Mills	Whittall Mills	March 5, 1980 (#80000490)	Properties off Brussels St. 42°14′27″N 71°48′54″W	
78	Woodland Street Firehouse	Woodland Street Firehouse	March 5, 1980 (#80000630)	36 Woodland St. 42°15′26″N 71°49′05″W	
79	Woodland Street Historic District	Woodland Street Historic District	March 5, 1980 (#80000549)	Properties along Hawthorne, Loudon, Norwood, and Woodland Sts. 42°15′11″N 71°49′15″W	
80	Worcester Bleach and Dye Works	Worcester Bleach and Dye Works	November 8, 2000 (#00001343)	60 Fremont St. 42°14′29″N 71°49′03″W	
81	Worcester Corset Company Factory	Worcester Corset Company Factory	October 4, 1984 (#84000097)	30 Wyman St. 42°14′56″N 71°49′10″W	
82	Worcester Market Building	Worcester Market Building	March 5, 1980 (#80000612)	831 Main St. 42°15′34″N 71°48′18″W	

== Former listings ==
	Name on the Register	Image	Date listed	Date removed	Location	City or town	Description
1	Stearns Tavern	Stearns Tavern	March 5, 1980 (#80000479)	December 26, 2023	651 Park Ave. 42°14′44″N 71°50′08″W	Worcester, Massachusetts	

== See also ==
- National Register of Historic Places listings in Worcester, Massachusetts
- National Register of Historic Places listings in northwestern Worcester, Massachusetts
- National Register of Historic Places listings in eastern Worcester, Massachusetts
- National Register of Historic Places listings in Worcester County, Massachusetts
