= James O'Connor-John Trybowski Three-Decker =

- U.S. National Register of Historic Places
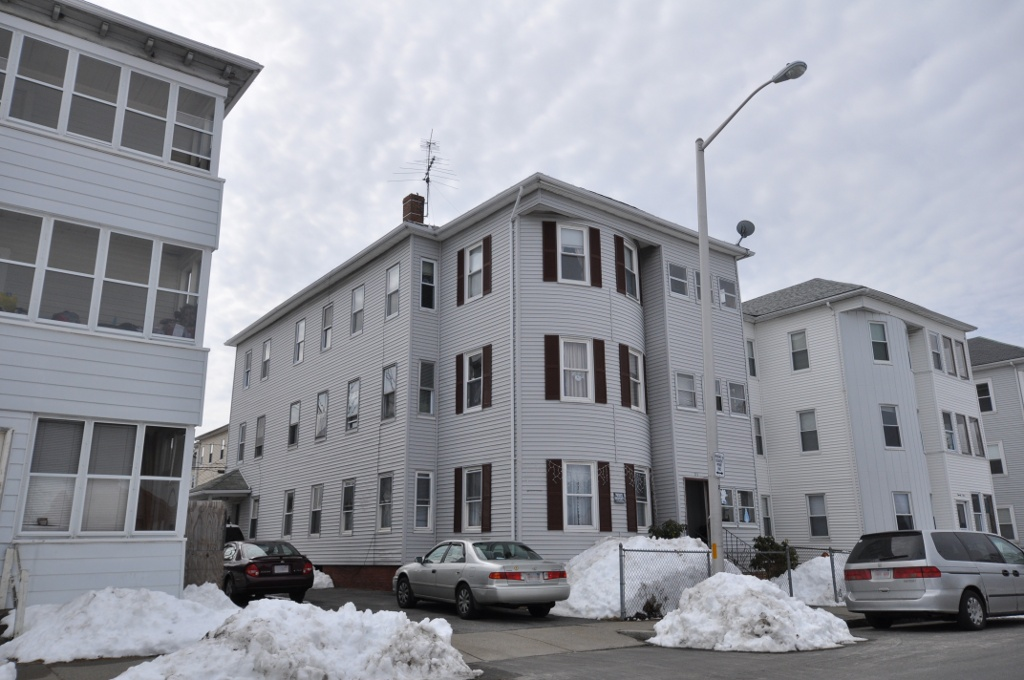

- Location within Massachusetts Location within the United States
- Location: 21 Canton St., Worcester, Massachusetts
- Coordinates: 42°14′56″N 71°48′10″W
- Built: 1914
- Architectural style: Colonial Revival
- MPS: Worcester Three-Deckers TR
- NRHP reference No.: 89002393
- Added to NRHP: February 9, 1990

The James O'Connor-John Trybowski Three-Decker is a historic triple decker in Worcester, Massachusetts. When the building was listed on the National Register of Historic Places in 1990, it was recognized for its well preserved Colonial Revival styling, including porches supported by heavy square columns, and decorative brackets on the cornice. It was built about 1914, and its first owner, James O'Connor, was a gasfitter, and its early tenants were Irish immigrants. Since its listing, the house's exterior has been resided, removing the cornice decorations and enclosing the porches (see photo).

== See also ==
- National Register of Historic Places listings in southwestern Worcester, Massachusetts
- National Register of Historic Places listings in Worcester County, Massachusetts
