= Samuel Hirst Three-Decker =

- U.S. National Register of Historic Places
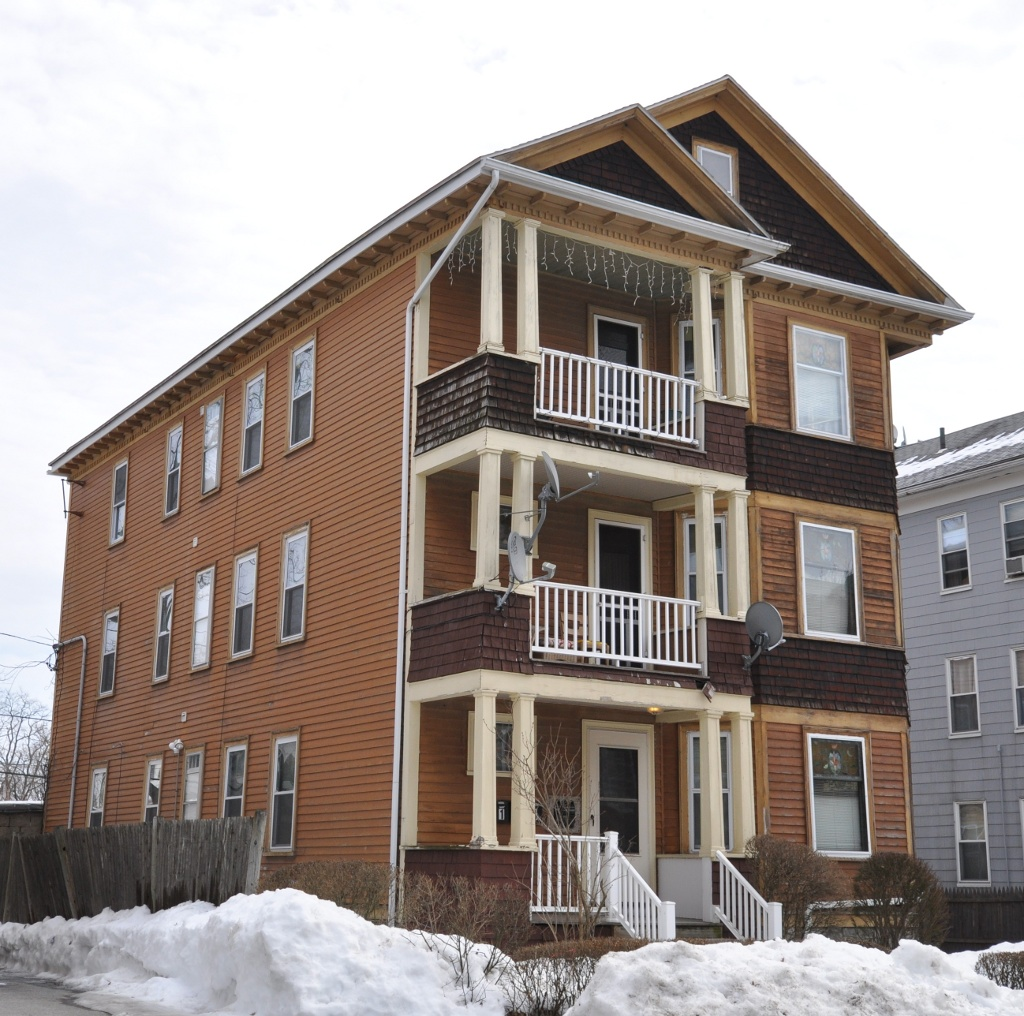

- Location within Massachusetts Location within the United States
- Location: 90 Lovell St., Worcester, Massachusetts
- Coordinates: 42°15′10″N 71°49′58″W
- Built: 1918
- Architectural style: Colonial Revival
- MPS: Worcester Three-Deckers TR
- NRHP reference No.: 89002420
- Added to NRHP: February 9, 1990

The Samuel Hirst Three-Decker is a historic triple decker in Worcester, Massachusetts. It is a well-preserved example of a Colonial Revival house built late in Worcester's westward expansion of triple-decker construction. It follows a typical side hall plan, with a distinctive front porch supported by paired square pillars through all three levels. The roof has an extended eave that is decorated with brackets and dentil molding.

The building was listed on the National Register of Historic Places in 1990.

== See also ==
- National Register of Historic Places listings in southwestern Worcester, Massachusetts
- National Register of Historic Places listings in Worcesterд County, Massachusetts
