= C.H. Fitch House =

Historic house in Massachusetts, United States

- U.S. National Register of Historic Places
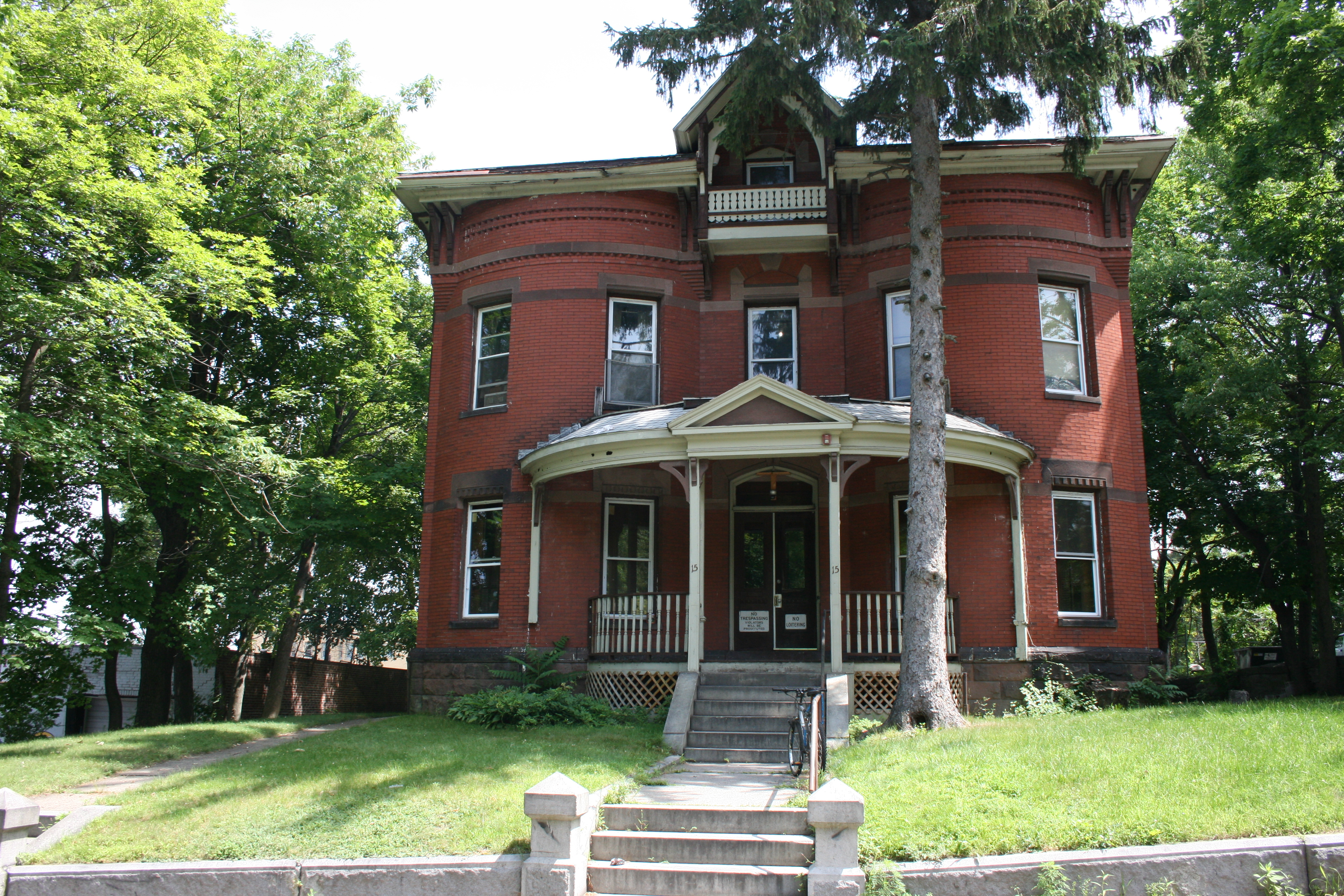

- Location within Massachusetts Location within the United States
- Location: 15 Oread St., Worcester, Massachusetts
- Coordinates: 42°15′20″N 71°48′41″W
- Built: 1878
- Architectural style: Late Victorian
- MPS: Worcester MRA
- NRHP reference No.: 80000631
- Added to NRHP: March 05, 1980

The C.H. Fitch House is a historic house at 15 Oread Street in Worcester, Massachusetts. The 2 1/2-story brick building was built c. 1878 for Charles H. Fitch, owner of boot manufacturing businesses. Its styling has both Italianate and Gothic Revival elements, including deep eaves with brackets (an instance of the former), and stone banding in the walls along with a porch decorated with jigsaw scrolling that are typical of the latter.

The house was listed on the National Register of Historic Places in 1980.

== See also ==
- National Register of Historic Places listings in southwestern Worcester, Massachusetts
- National Register of Historic Places listings in Worcester County, Massachusetts
