= Junction Shop and Hermon Street District =

Historic district in Massachusetts, United States

- U.S. National Register of Historic Places
- U.S. Historic district
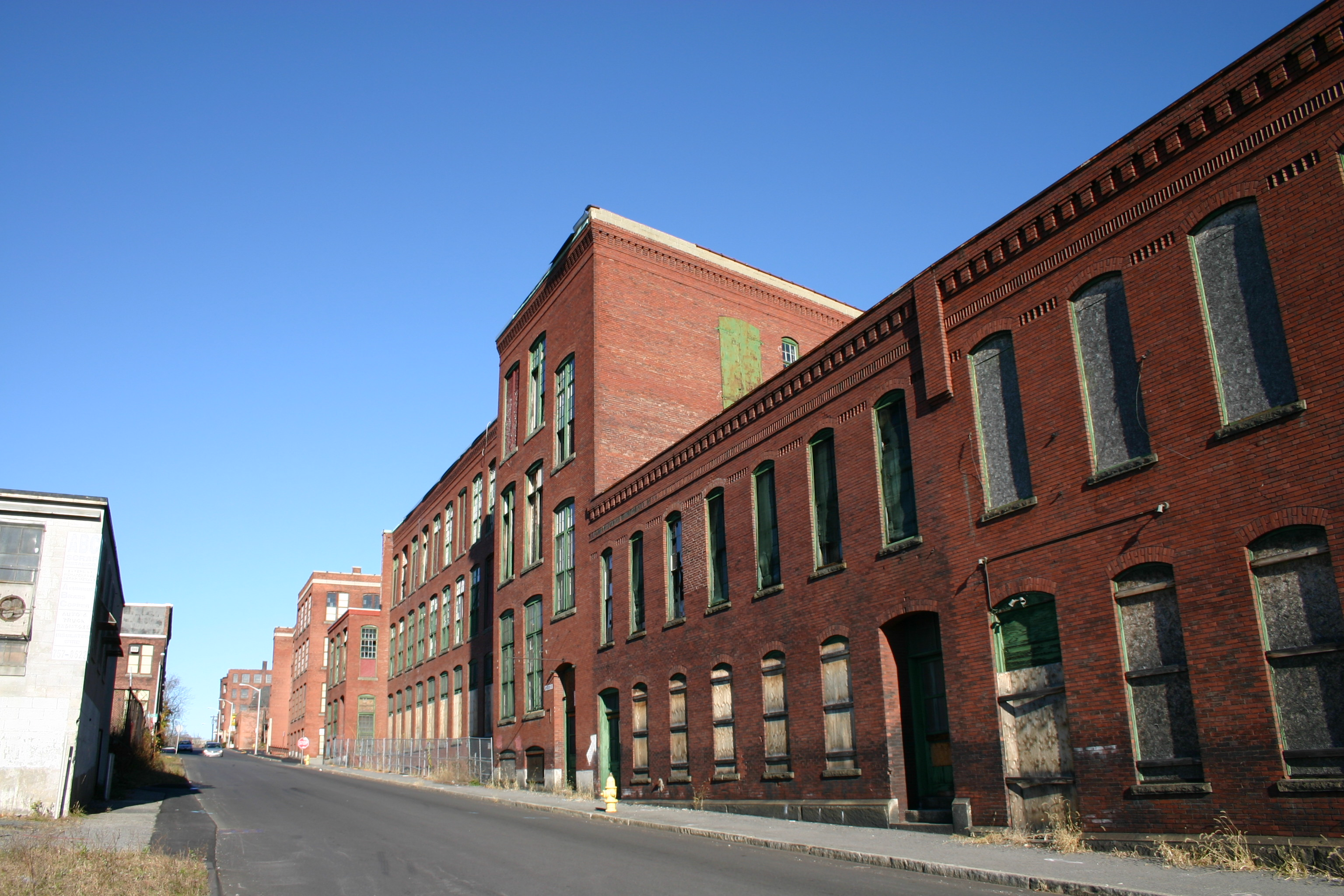
- Jackson Street

- Location within Massachusetts Location within the United States
- Location: Properties on Jackson, Hermon, and Beacon Sts., Worcester, Massachusetts
- Coordinates: 42°15′22″N 71°48′28″W
- Built: 1851
- MPS: Worcester MRA
- NRHP reference No.: 80000533
- Added to NRHP: March 05, 1980

The Junction Shop and Hermon Street District is a historic district comprising 28 industrial properties on Jackson, Hermon, and Beacon Streets on the south side of Worcester, Massachusetts. It is a remnant of a once larger 19th and early 20th century manufacturing district just west of the railway junction between the Boston and Maine Railroad and the New York, New Haven and Hartford Railroad. It was listed on the National Register of Historic Places in 1980.

The area was first developed in the 1850s by James Estabrook and Charles Wood, and continued to be developed by the Estabrook family into the early 20th century. The oldest building, known as the Junction Shop, was built in 1851 by Worcester's famous teacher, inventor and abolitionist Eli Thayer, and followed a previously successful model of factory ownership in which the facility owner provided rental space, power, and other facilities to small manufacturers. Eli Thayer also built Adriatic Mills, formerly on Armory St and was the inventor of the hydraulic elevator. Power was provided by two Corliss steam engines. It is well known for its later occupation by the Knowles Loom Company, a major manufacturer of textile processing equipment. This three story stone building is 450 feet (140 m) long and 50 feet (15 m). It is located in the block surrounded by Jackson, Hermon, and Beacon Streets, and the railroad tracks, and is surrounded within that block by a series of brick additions (built from the 1870s to the 1910s) which obscure much of its bulk.

In addition to the Junction Shop, a series of smaller factory blocks line Beacon Street between Herman and Jackson Streets. Those on the east side were built between the 1870s and 1890s by the Estabrooks for the Glasgo Thread Company. The north side of Jackson Street between the tracks and Harris Court is also lined with Estabrook-built factories, as is the south side of Hermon Street.

In 2012, the Planning Board gave the nod to a developer to turn the abandoned and derelict buildings into affordable housing units now known as the Junction Shops Mill Project. The Junction Shop lofts officially opened their doors in late 2015. Now, under Brady Sullivan's ownership, the historic building has been transformed into luxury apartments for rent in Worcester. Featuring apartment homes that range in size from one to four bedrooms, each apartment captures the historic past of the building, while providing modern comfort for today's residents. These renovated mill lofts in Worcester feature stainless steel appliances, original reclaimed hardwood or bamboo floors, granite countertops, and sophisticated designer paint colors, all in combination with the mill's characteristic soaring ceilings and large, bright windows.

== Select businesses located in the district ==
- Access Fixtures
- Clark Mailing Service
- George's Coney Island Hot Dogs
- Miss Worcester Diner

== See also ==
- National Register of Historic Places listings in southwestern Worcester, Massachusetts
- National Register of Historic Places listings in Worcester County, Massachusetts
