= Edward Stark House =

Historic house in Massachusetts, United States

- U.S. National Register of Historic Places
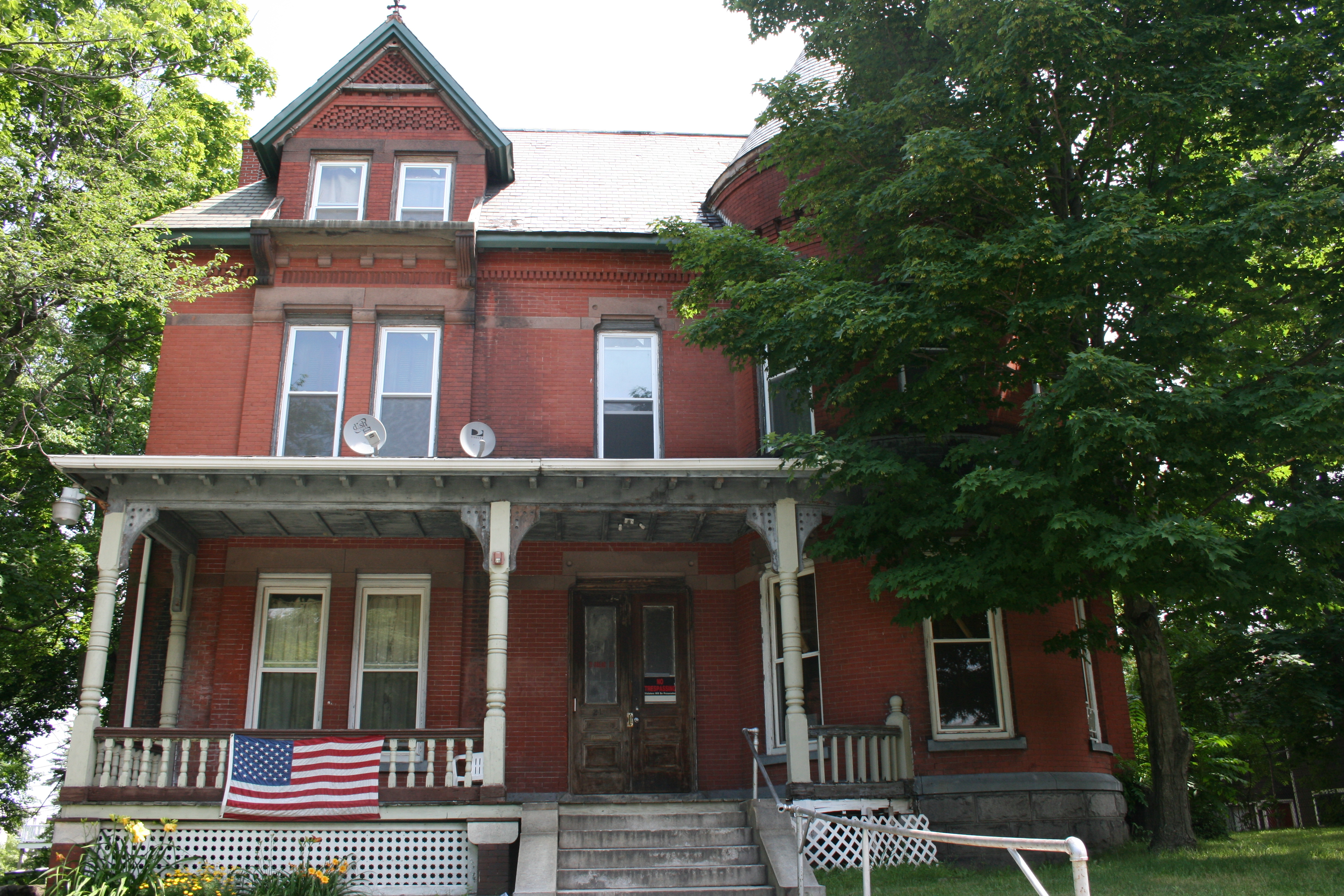

- Location within Massachusetts Location within the United States
- Location: 21 Oread St., Worcester, Massachusetts
- Coordinates: 42°15′18″N 71°48′39″W
- Built: 1880
- Architect: John B. Woodworth
- Architectural style: Queen Anne
- MPS: Worcester MRA
- NRHP reference No.: 80000633
- Added to NRHP: March 05, 1980

The Edward Stark House is a historic house at 21 Oread Street in Worcester, Massachusetts.

== History ==
The 2 1/2-story Queen Anne Victorian house was built in 1880 for Edward H. Stark, owner of a boot and shoe factory. It is principally brick, with sandstone trim, and resting on a sandstone block foundation. Its features include a rounded bay that rises to a conical turret, and a porch with turned balusters and pillars. It was designed by John B. Woodworth, a local architect, and is the finest known example of his work.

The house was listed on the National Register of Historic Places in 1980.

== See also ==
- Norcross Brothers Houses, similar buildings nearby
- National Register of Historic Places listings in southwestern Worcester, Massachusetts
- National Register of Historic Places listings in Worcester County, Massachusetts
