= Crystal Street Historic District =

Historic district in Massachusetts, United States

- U.S. National Register of Historic Places
- U.S. Historic district
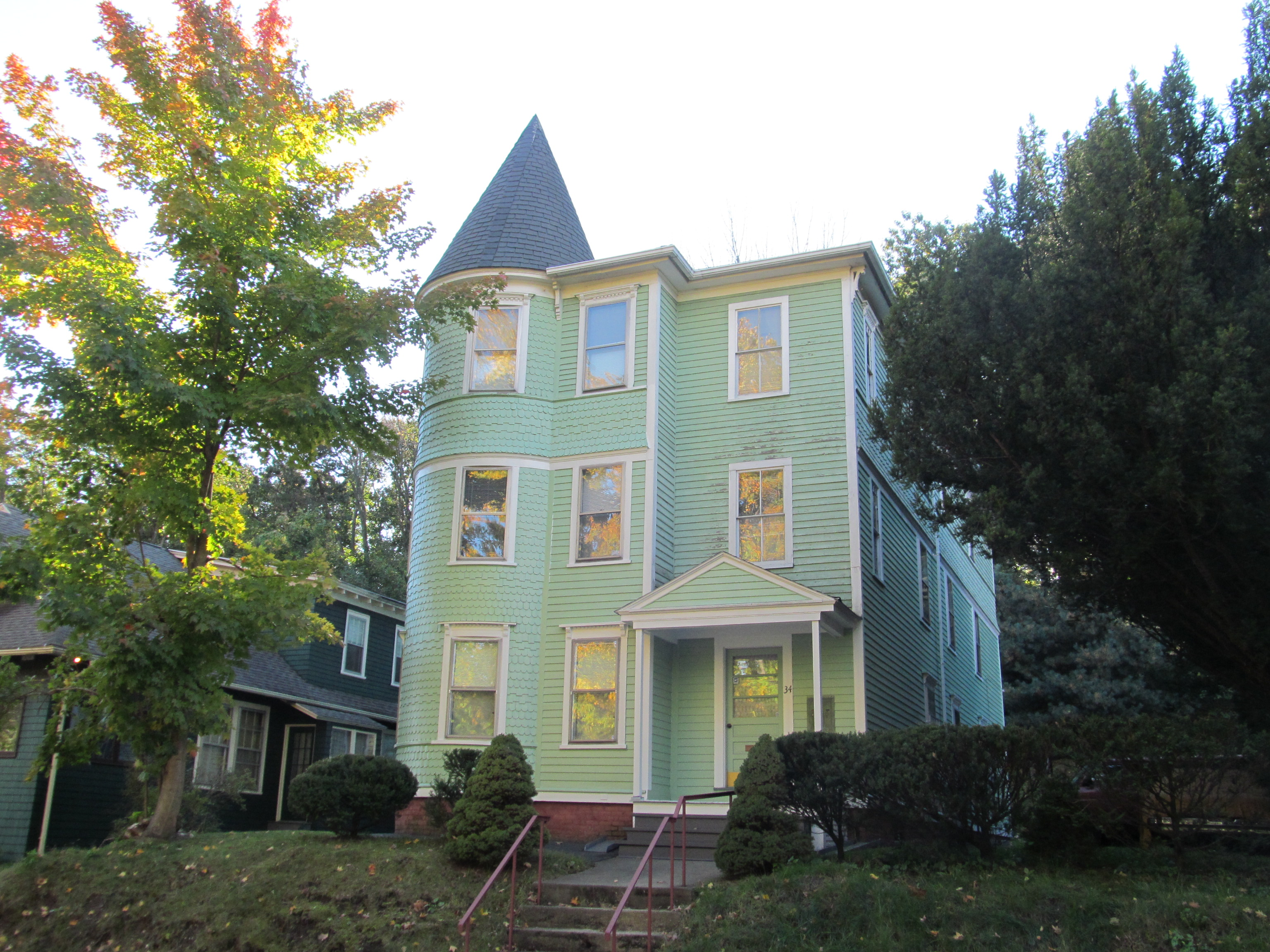
- 34 Crystal Street

- Location within Massachusetts Location within the United States
- Location: 30–34 Crystal St., Worcester, Massachusetts
- Coordinates: 42°14′47″N 71°49′24″W
- Area: less than one acre
- Built: 1892
- Architectural style: Queen Anne
- MPS: Worcester Three-Deckers TR
- NRHP reference No.: 89002379
- Added to NRHP: February 9, 1990

The Crystal Street Historic District is a group of three triple deckers facing University Park in the Main South area of Worcester, Massachusetts. The houses appear to have been built for developer James Harrop, who lived at 30 Crystal Street and owned them for 35 years. At the time of their construction circa 1892, Harrop is described in city directories as a wool sorter, but, over the following years, he became a real estate developer. The houses were built at a time when the area was experiencing significant development due to the extensions of the electrified street cars to the area. Early residents of the buildings would have been skilled laborers and middle-class white collar workers.

The three buildings are all well-preserved examples of Queen Anne triple deckers, and they are almost identical in their construction. They follow the standard side hall plan and have a jog on one side. The main facade is three bays wide, but asymmetrical: the bay on one side has the entry covered by a simple gable-roofed porch, and the bay at the opposite end is rounded with a conical roof. The porch on 30 Crystal Street has retained turned porch columns, while those of 32 and 34 have been replaced with square posts.

All three buildings have similar exterior finishes. They are clad in clapboards, except for the rounded section, which is sheathed in decorative cut wood shingles. These shingles are also used in banding portions separating the second and third floors.

The district was listed on the National Register of Historic Places in 1990.

== See also ==
- National Register of Historic Places listings in southwestern Worcester, Massachusetts
- National Register of Historic Places listings in Worcester County, Massachusetts
