= Worcester Bleach and Dye Works =

- U.S. National Register of Historic Places
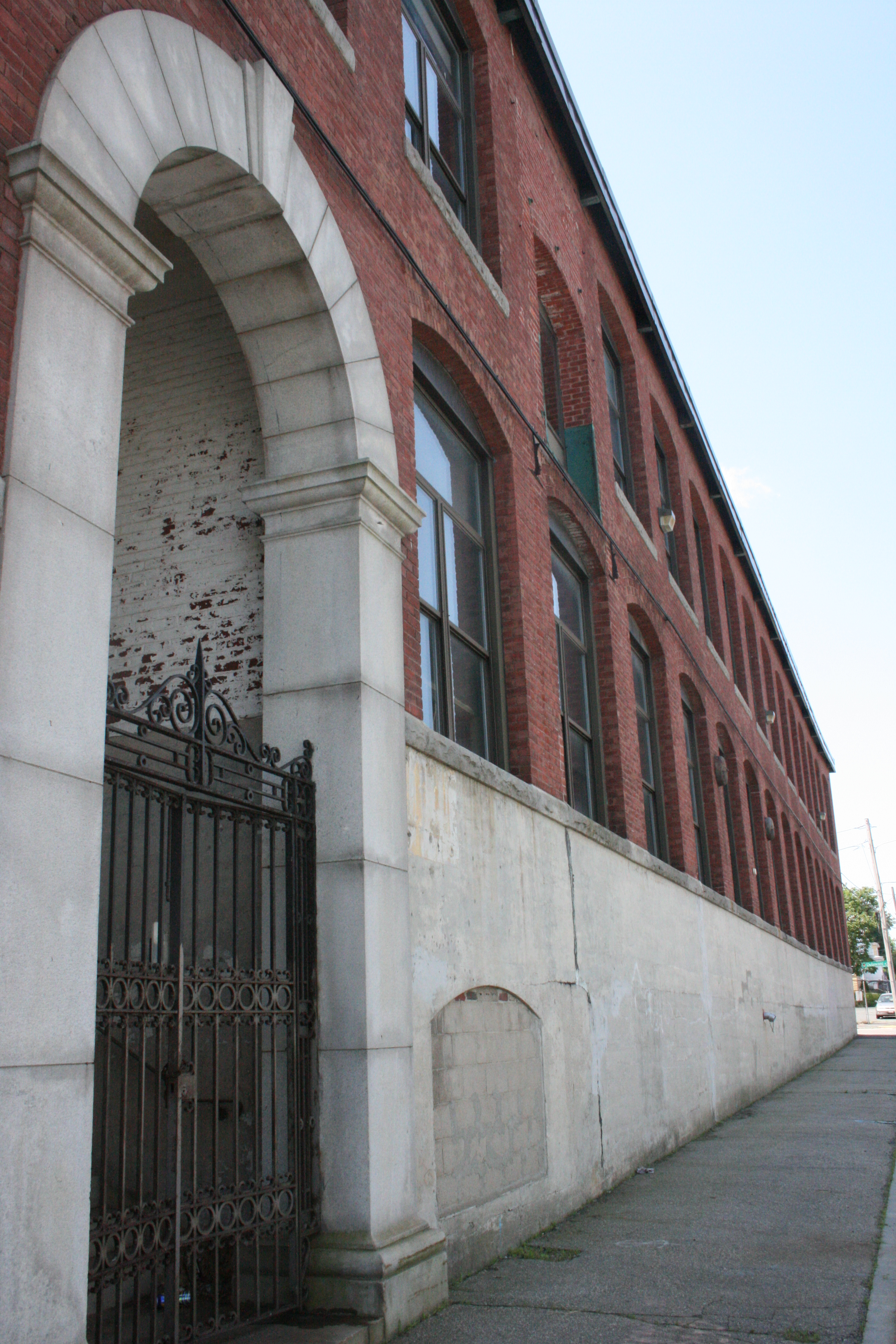

- Location within Massachusetts Location within the United States
- Location: 60 Fremont St., Worcester, Massachusetts
- Coordinates: 42°14′29″N 71°49′3″W
- Architectural style: Classical Revival
- NRHP reference No.: 00001343
- Added to NRHP: November 08, 2000

The Worcester Bleach and Dye Works is a historic factory complex at 60 Fremont Street in Worcester, Massachusetts. It consists of a pair of primarily brick factory buildings, one of which was built in 1909, and the other built later, between 1911 and 1922, for the named company, which was a major local manufacturer of thread. After the Bleach and Dye Works closed its doors in 1938, the complex has seen a succession of other owners.

The Springdale Dye Works was founded in 1865, and initially operated near Southgate and Gardner Streets on Worcester's south side, and was at the city's industrial height one of six threadmakers. The business's name was changed in 1873 after one of several ownership changes, and in 1879 it moved to premises on Grove Street near the Washburn and Moen Wire Works. In 1888 the company built a wood-frame factory at 61 Fremont Street, across the street from the later buildings. This 1888 building was either demolished or partially incorporated into the building now standing on that site.

The first building of the present complex was built in 1909, across the street from the 1888 building. The two buildings were originally joined by a bridge over Fremont Street, evidenced by a doorway on the second floor of the front facade of 60 Fremont. The 1909 building is a two-story brick building that fronts directly to the sidewalk on Fremont and Delaware Streets. Its main facade is 18 window bays, and the only major decorative element is the entry bay, which is a Classical Revival style round arch, with granite steps leading up to a recessed entrance. The second brick building is a three-story structure, built in a similar style as the first one. The two are connected by a two-story wood-frame structure that runs the length of the first building, and joins at its southeast corner to the second building. This section was finished in stucco during a 1986 renovation, and is occupied by modern offices.

The Bleach and Dye Works closed in 1938. The next major occupant of the premises was the Economic Machinery Corporation, which machines for handling adhesive labels, and moved out in 1966. Capital Shoe Footwear, founded in 1955, moved in the following year, and was the last shoemaker in the city, closing its doors in 1984. The buildings were purchased by the Valkyrie Corporation the following year, modernized, and used for the production of small leather goods.

The complex was listed on the National Register of Historic Places in 2000.

== See also ==
- National Register of Historic Places listings in southwestern Worcester, Massachusetts
- National Register of Historic Places listings in Worcester County, Massachusetts
