= Fuller & Delano =

Practice information
- Partners: James E. Fuller; Ward P. Delano II; Robert L. Fuller; Ward P. Delano III
- Founders: James E. Fuller
- Founded: 1878
- Dissolved: 1942
- Location: Worcester, Massachusetts

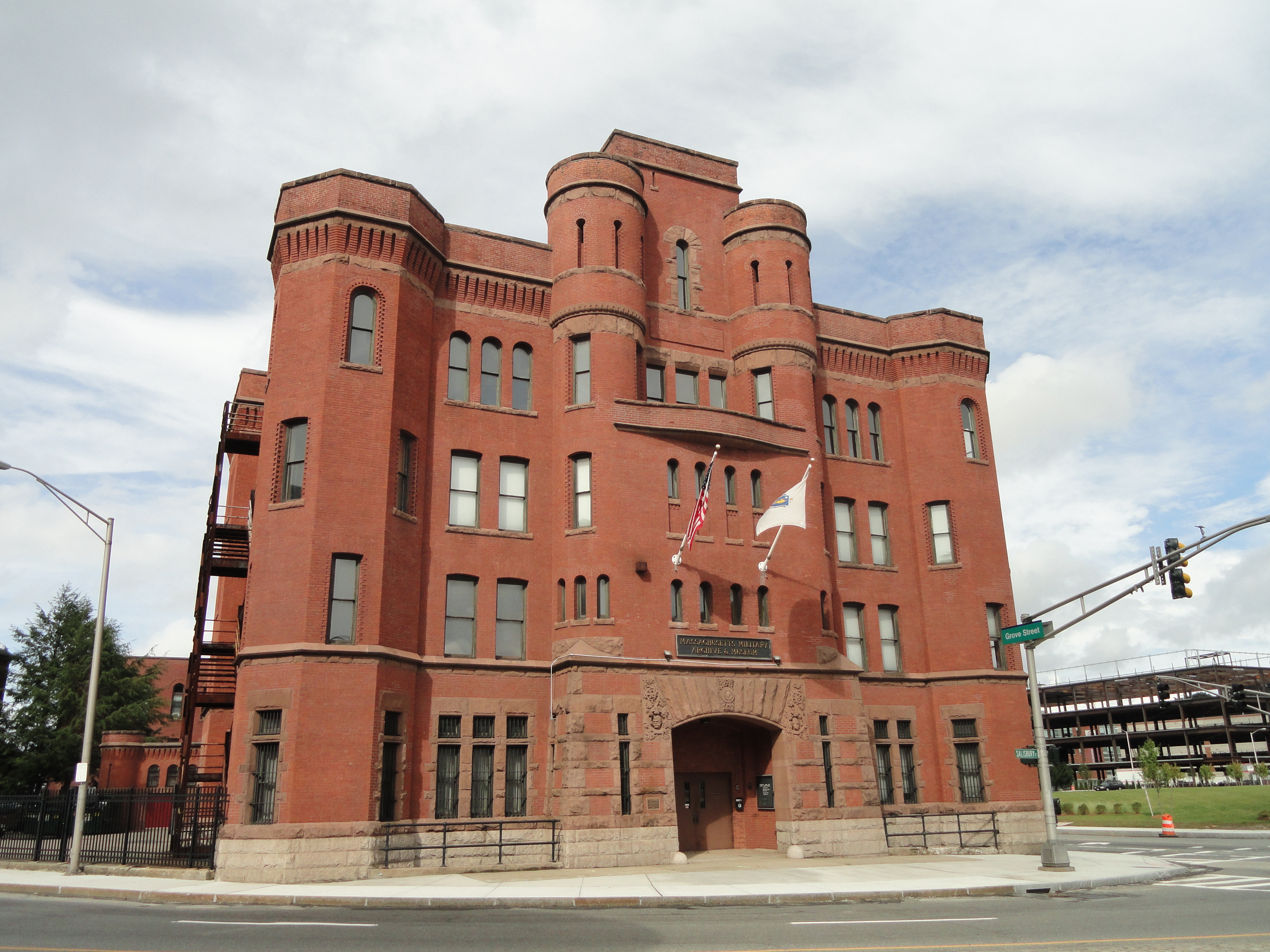
The former Worcester Armory, designed by Fuller & Delano and built in 1888–89.

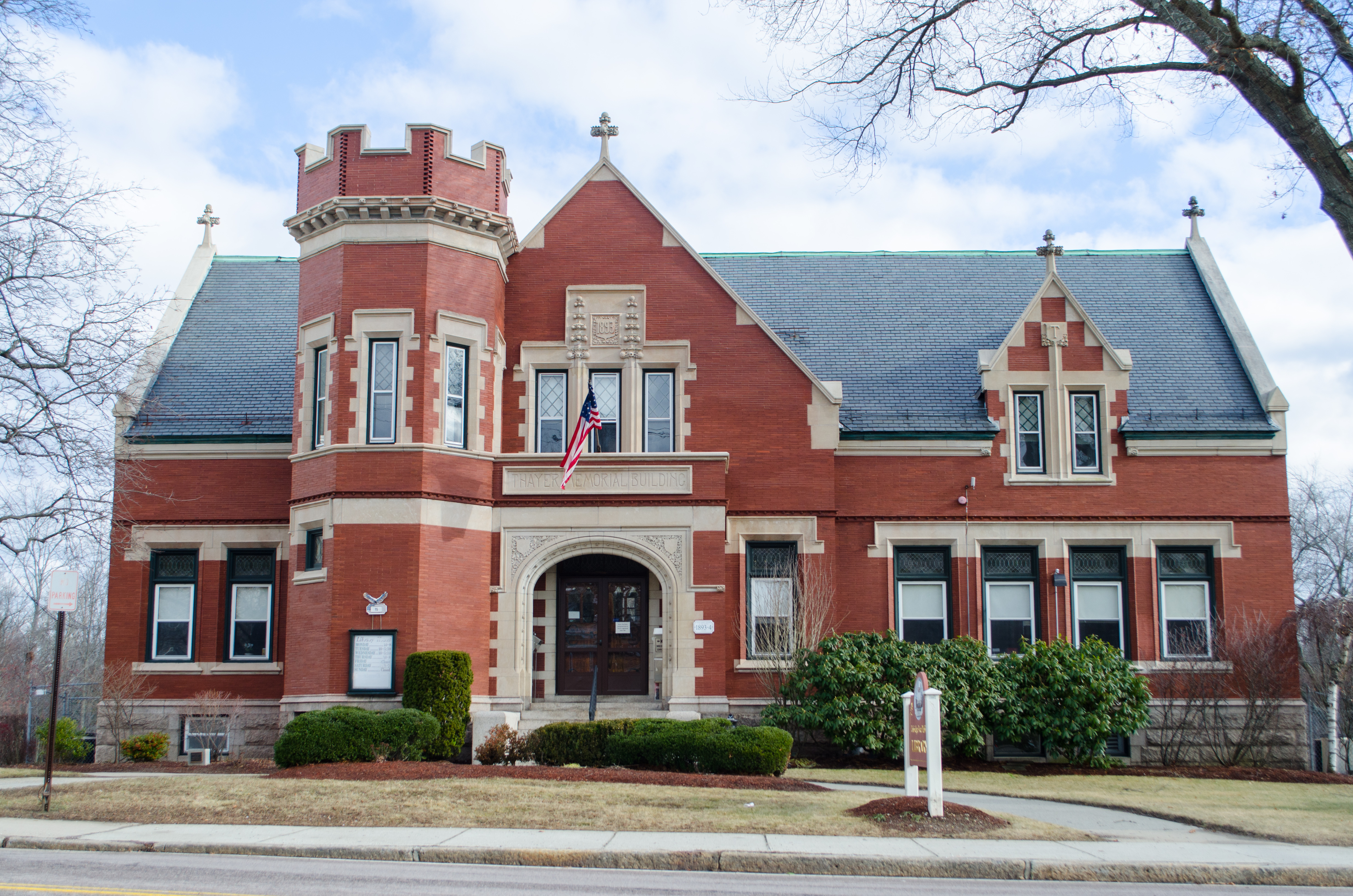
The Uxbridge Free Public Library, designed by Fuller & Delano and built in 1893.

Fuller & Delano was an architectural firm in Worcester, Massachusetts, active from 1878 until 1942. It originally consisted of architects James E. Fuller and Ward P. Delano. The firm designed more than 20 buildings that were later listed on the U.S. National Register of Historic Places.

== Firm history ==
Fuller & Delano was established in 1878 by James E. Fuller and Ward P. Delano II. Though trained as a carpenter, Fuller had been partner of architect Stephen C. Earle from 1866 to 1876. Fuller was formally associated with Delano after he had been a draftsman in his office for about a year. They were continuously associated until Fuller's death in 1901, though a third architect, Howard Frost, was a member of the partnership from 1895 to 1899. (Note: Howard Frost was born in 1859 and briefly attended Harvard, but dropped out in 1879 to take a job with Fuller & Delano, making partner in 1895. In 1899 he left to establish his own firm, Frost, Briggs & Chamberlain, and became one of the most prominent architects in the city. He died in 1946.)

After Fuller's and Delano's deaths, respectively, their sons, Robert L. Fuller and Ward P. Delano III were brought into the partnership. The younger Fuller and Delano worked together until Delano's suicide in 1940, and Fuller retired in 1942, ending the firm's sixty-four years of continuous practice.

Fuller & Delano initially kept their offices in the building of the Peoples Savings Bank, 452 Main Street, where Earle & Fuller had their office since they designed it in 1869. In 1911 they relocated to the Chase Building, 44 Front Street, which the firm had designed in 1886. They stayed there until Robert L. Fuller retired in 1942.

== Biographies of partners ==
James Edward Fuller
- Born: October 5, 1836; Warwick, Massachusetts
- Died: July 31, 1901 (aged 64); Worcester, Massachusetts
- Occupation: Architect

Ward Parker Delano II
- Born: January 12, 1851; Marion, Massachusetts
- Died: September 23, 1915 (aged 64); Worcester, Massachusetts
- Occupation: Architect

Robert Lesure Fuller
- Born: July 29, 1871; Worcester, Massachusetts
- Died: October 19, 1950 (aged 79); Worcester, Massachusetts
- Occupation: Architect

Ward Parker Delano III
- Born: July 29, 1883; Worcester, Massachusetts
- Died: January 10, 1940 (aged 56); Worcester, Massachusetts
- Occupation: Architect

=== James Edward Fuller ===
James Edward Fuller was born October 5, 1836, in Warwick, Massachusetts to James Fuller and Nancy (Lesure) Fuller. He was first trained in the building trades, being apprenticed to his brother, a carpenter. From 1858 to 1865 he was a carpenter on his own account in Athol. Ultimately deciding to become an architect, in 1865 he moved to Worcester and entered the office of E. Boyden & Son, where he remained for a year. In 1866 he joined the firm of Stephen C. Earle as partner, forming the firm of Earle & Fuller. They worked together until the partnership was dissolved in 1876. In 1878, after two years of independent practice, Fuller formed a partnership with draftsman Ward P. Delano. Fuller and Delano continued their association until Fuller's death, which occurred in Worcester on July 31, 1901.

In 1859 Fuller married Clara Delia Gould, also of Warwick, and they had three children who lived to adulthood: Clara Gertrude (Fuller) Douglass, born 1861, James Edward Fuller, born 1865, a contractor affiliated with the George A. Fuller Company and Robert Lesure Fuller, detailed below. In 1890 Fuller purchased the Charles Newton House, built c.1846 in northern Worcester, where he lived for the rest of his life. His children built houses on the property as well.

From 1892 until his death Fuller was a Fellow of the American Institute of Architects.

The Fuller family of Warwick was descended from Samuel Fuller, who immigrated to North America in 1620 aboard the Mayflower.

=== Ward Parker Delano II ===
Ward Parker Delano II was born January 12, 1851, in Marion, Massachusetts to Ward Parker Delano and Amanda F. (Delano) Delano. He attended the public schools, and as a young man worked for a coal company, working in the South for several years during Reconstruction. When he returned north he worked for a number of architects and builders in Boston, ultimately entering the office of Ware & Van Brunt. He remained there until 1877, when he moved west to Worcester for a job with Fuller. They became business partners in 1878. They worked together until Fuller's death in 1901, when Delano brought Fuller's son into the business and incorporated the firm.

In 1881 he married Elizabeth Holmes Sparrow of Mattapoisett, Massachusetts. They had five children, three of which lived to adulthood, including Ward Parker Delano III. Delano died in Worcester, September 23, 1915.

Though Delano became a Fellow of the American Institute of Architects alongside his partner in 1892, he resigned his membership in 1902.

The Delano family of Marion was descended from Philip Delano, who immigrated to North America in 1621.

=== Robert Lesure Fuller ===
Robert Lesure Fuller was born June 29, 1871, in Worcester, the youngest child of James E. Fuller. He attended public schools and the Massachusetts Institute of Technology, graduating in 1896. After graduation he returned to Worcester and entered the office of Fuller & Delano. In 1900 he served as representative of his cousin's contracting firm, the George A. Fuller Company, at the Exposition Universelle in Paris. Upon his father's death in 1901 he became a principal in the newly incorporated Fuller & Delano Company. After the death of Ward P. Delano II, Ward P. Delano III became a principal. Fuller and Delano remained associated until Delano's death in 1940. Fuller continued the firm for two more years, retiring in 1942.

Fuller first married Mary W. White of Worcester. After her death, he married Luella Morrow of Holden, Massachusetts. Fuller had two children, both by his first wife. Fuller died October 18, 1950.

Fuller was affiliated with the Worcester (now Central Massachusetts) chapter of the American Institute of Architects, but was not a member of the national organization.

=== Ward Parker Delano III ===
Ward Parker Delano III was born July 24, 1883, in Worcester, the eldest child of Ward Parker Delano II. He attended Tabor Academy in Marion and the Massachusetts Institute of Technology, graduating in 1905. He worked for a number of other architects in Boston and New York before entering his father's firm in 1908. He became a principal in 1915 upon his father's death. He never married. He died by suicide in his office, January 10, 1940.

== Legacy ==
Fuller & Delano were the architects of at least twenty buildings that have been listed on the United States National Register of Historic Places, and others contribute to listed historic districts.

== Architectural works ==
=== In Worcester, Massachusetts ===
- House for George L. Robbins, 104 Vernon St, Worcester, Massachusetts (1880)
- Worcester City Hospital, (Note: Later buildings survive, including the Memorial Home for Nurses (1897), Outpatient Building (1904) and Thayer Hall (1927).) 26 Queen St, Worcester, Massachusetts (1880-81 et seq., partially extant)
- Sawyer Building, (Note: Combined with the neighboring Dodge Block (1869) to create the Bancroft Trust Building, NRHP-listed in 2002.) 60 Franklin St, Worcester, Massachusetts (1882)
- Robinson and Swan Blocks, 1 and 3 Irving St, Worcester, Massachusetts (1884, NRHP 1980)
- House for Moody E. Shattuck, 738 Main St, Worcester, Massachusetts (1885, NRHP 1980)
- Cambridge Street Firehouse, 534 Cambridge St, Worcester, Massachusetts (1886, NRHP 1980)
- Chase Building, (Note: Built by landowner R. C. Taylor, who also hired Fuller & Delano to design the adjacent buildings at 38 Front Street and 50 Front Street, built in 1883 and 1896, respectively.) 44 Front St, Worcester, Massachusetts (1886)
- House for Edwin A. Kelley, (Note: A contributing property to the Lincoln Estate–Elm Park Historic District, NRHP-listed in 1980.) 45 Cedar St, Worcester, Massachusetts (1886)
- Woodland Street Firehouse, 36 Woodland St, Worcester, Massachusetts (1886, NRHP 1980)
- YMCA Building, 8 Elm St, Worcester, Massachusetts (1886–87, demolished)
- Apartment building for Thomas H. Hall, (Note: A contributing property to the Wellington Street Apartment House District, NRHP-listed in 1980.) 84 Murray Ave, Worcester, Massachusetts (1887)
- House for Otis E. Putnam, 25 Harvard St, Worcester, Massachusetts (1887, NRHP 1980)
- Receiving tomb, Hope Cemetery, Worcester, Massachusetts (1887)
- Brightside Apartments, 2 King St, Worcester, Massachusetts (1888, NRHP 1980)
- Worcester Armory (former), (Note: For several years this building was home to the Massachusetts National Guard Museum and Archives, which moved to Concord in 2013. In 2014 ownership was transferred to Veterans Inc., which had leased part of the building since 1991.) (Note: A contributing property to the Institutional District, NRHP-listed in 1980.) 44 Salisbury and 69 Grove Sts, Worcester, Massachusetts (1888–89 and 1907)
- Albion Apartments, 765 Main St, Worcester, Massachusetts (1889)
- House for Philip W. Moen, 60 Elm St, Worcester, Massachusetts (1889, demolished)
- Old South Congregational Church (former), (Note: After the congregation moved, the church was largely demolished and converted into an apartment building. The main facade and rear wing remain substantially as built.) 714 Main St, Worcester, Massachusetts (1889, partially demolished)
- Salisbury Street School, (Note: In 1911 this building became North High School, and after 1980 was converted into condominiums.) 50 Salisbury St, Worcester, Massachusetts (1889)
- Walker Hall, (Note: The Worcester Academy campus was NRHP-listed in 1980.) Worcester Academy, Worcester, Massachusetts (1889)
- Worcester Theatre, 20 Exchange St, Worcester, Massachusetts (1889, demolished)
- House for Edwin S. Pierce, (Note: A contributing property to Hammond Heights, NRHP-listed in 1980.) 272 Highland St, Worcester, Massachusetts (1890)
- O'Kane Hall, College of the Holy Cross, Worcester, Massachusetts (1891–95)
- Dexter Hall, Worcester Academy, Worcester, Massachusetts (1892)
- Greendale School, 130 Leeds St, Worcester, Massachusetts (1893)
- House for William H. Burns, 65 Cedar St, Worcester, Massachusetts (1893)
- Farmhouse, Worcester State Hospital (1894–95, NRHP 2017)
- Malvern Road School, 928 Southbridge St, Worcester, Massachusetts (1896, NRHP 1984)
- South Baptist Church, 949 Main St, Worcester, Massachusetts (1896, demolished)
- House for S. Foster Goodwin, 9 Germain St, Worcester, Massachusetts (1897)
- House for William J. Hogg, 54 Elm St, Worcester, Massachusetts (1897, NRHP 1980)
- Park Theatre, 12 Front St, Worcester, Massachusetts (1898, altered)
- Dwight Foster Building, 33 Waldo St, Worcester, Massachusetts (1899)
- Enterprise Building, 540 Main St, Worcester, Massachusetts (1900, NRHP 1980)
- Eastern Avenue Firehouse, 126 Eastern Ave, Worcester, Massachusetts (1901)
- Bancroft School, 111 Elm St, Worcester, Massachusetts (1902, demolished)
- Central Exchange Building addition, (Note: A contributing property to the Mechanics' Hall District, NRHP-listed in 1980.) 311 Main St, Worcester, Massachusetts (1902)
- Nurses' Home, Worcester State Hospital, Worcester, Massachusetts (1902–03)
- Swedish Evangelical Lutheran Gethsemane Church, 43 Belmont St, Worcester, Massachusetts (1908–11)
- Shelter and community house, Lake Park, Worcester, Massachusetts (1911)
- Quinsigamond Branch Library (former), 14 Blackstone River Rd, Worcester, Massachusetts (1913, NRHP 1980)
- Norwegian Lutheran Church, 54 Highland St, Worcester, Massachusetts (1916–17)
- Zion Lutheran Church, 41 Whitmarsh Ave, Worcester, Massachusetts (1919–20)
- Indian Hill School, 155 Ararat St, Worcester, Massachusetts (1924)
- Jewish Home for the Aged (former), 1029 Pleasant St, Worcester, Massachusetts (1931–32)

=== Elsewhere in Worcester County ===
- Clarke School, (Note: Formerly a contributing property to the Whitinsville Historic District, NRHP-listed in 1983.) Cross and East Sts, Whitinsville, Massachusetts (1878, demolished)
- First Congregational Church, (Note: A contributing property to the Gardner Uptown Historic District, NRHP-listed in 1999.) 28 Green St, Gardner, Massachusetts (1878–79)
- First Congregational Church, 36 N Main St, West Brookfield, Massachusetts (1881, demolished)
- Memorial Congregational Church, (Note: A contributing property to the Baldwinville Village Historic District, NRHP-listed in 1986.) 16 Elm St, Baldwinville, Massachusetts (1881)
- Grove Street School addition, (Note: A contributing property to the Spencer Town Center Historic District, NRHP-listed in 1986.) 22 Grove St, Spencer, Massachusetts (1883, NRHP 1996)
- Pleasant Street School, 54 Pleasant St, Spencer, Massachusetts (1883, NRHP 1996)
- Levi Heywood Memorial Library Building, 28 Pearl St, Gardner, Massachusetts (1885)
- "Marchmont" for Joseph N. White, Glenallen St, Winchendon, Massachusetts (1888–90, demolished 1957)
- Bank Block, 388 Main St, Athol, Massachusetts (1889, altered 1928)
- St. Joseph R. C. Church, 49 Woodland St, Fitchburg, Massachusetts (1890–92)
- Holbrook Memorial Chapel, Mount Vernon Cemetery, West Boylston, Massachusetts (1891)
- Columbia Block, (Note: A contributing property to the Main Street Historic District, NRHP-listed in 1982.) 228-230 Main St, Webster, Massachusetts (1892)
- Haston Free Public Library, 149 Main St, North Brookfield, Massachusetts (1893)
- Uxbridge Free Public Library, (Note: A contributing property to the Uxbridge Common District, NRHP-listed in 1984.) 15 N Main St, Uxbridge, Massachusetts (1893)
- Baldwinville School, 733 Baldwinville Rd, Baldwinville, Massachusetts (1898)
- Grafton State Hospital, Grafton, Massachusetts (1903 et seq., NRHP 1994)
- Boylston Public Library, 695 Main St, Boylston, Massachusetts (1904)
- Fobes Memorial Library, (Note: A contributing property to the Oakham Center Historic District, NRHP-listed in 2020.) 4 Maple St, Oakham, Massachusetts (1907)
- Keating Building, 21 E Main St, Westborough, Massachusetts (1915)
- Holden Hospital, 61 Boyden Rd, Holden, Massachusetts (1922)

=== Elsewhere in Massachusetts ===
- Hudson High School, 20 Felton St, Hudson, Massachusetts (1882, NRHP 1982)
- Franklin County Jail and House of Correction, 160 Elm St, Greenfield, Massachusetts (1886)
- Walker Building, 1242 Main St, Springfield, Massachusetts (1890, NRHP 1983)
- Warwick Town Hall, 12 Athol Rd, Warwick, Massachusetts (1894–95)
- Adams Hatchery (former), (Note: A trout hatchery, closed and sold by the state in 1920. The main building is presently used for retail.) 169 Grove St, Adams, Massachusetts (1899)
- Mattapoisett Free Public Library, 7 Barstow St, Mattapoisett, Massachusetts (1903)
- Strand Theatre, 1157 Acushnet Ave, New Bedford, Massachusetts (1910, altered)
- Warwick Free Public Library, (Note: Converted from the former Baptist church of Warwick.) 4 Hotel Rd, Warwick, Massachusetts (1918–19)

=== In New Hampshire ===
- Gordon-Nash Library, 69 Main St, New Hampton, New Hampshire (1895, NRHP 1988)
- House for Addison G. Cook, 135 Academy St, Laconia, New Hampshire (1897)
- Keene Public Library, (Note: The architects converted the 1869 residence of Henry Colony into a library and art gallery, consisting of interior remodeling and an addition for book stacks.) 60 Winter St, Keene, New Hampshire (1898–99)
- "Aldworth Manor" for Arthur E. Childs, (Note: The architects were responsible for relocating the house to New Hampshire and performing an initial remodeling. It was not until 1915 that architect Kilham & Hopkins of Boston, were commissioned to remodel the house into its current state.) 184 Aldworth Rd, Harrisville, New Hampshire (1905, altered 1915, NRHP 1988)

== Gallery of architectural works ==
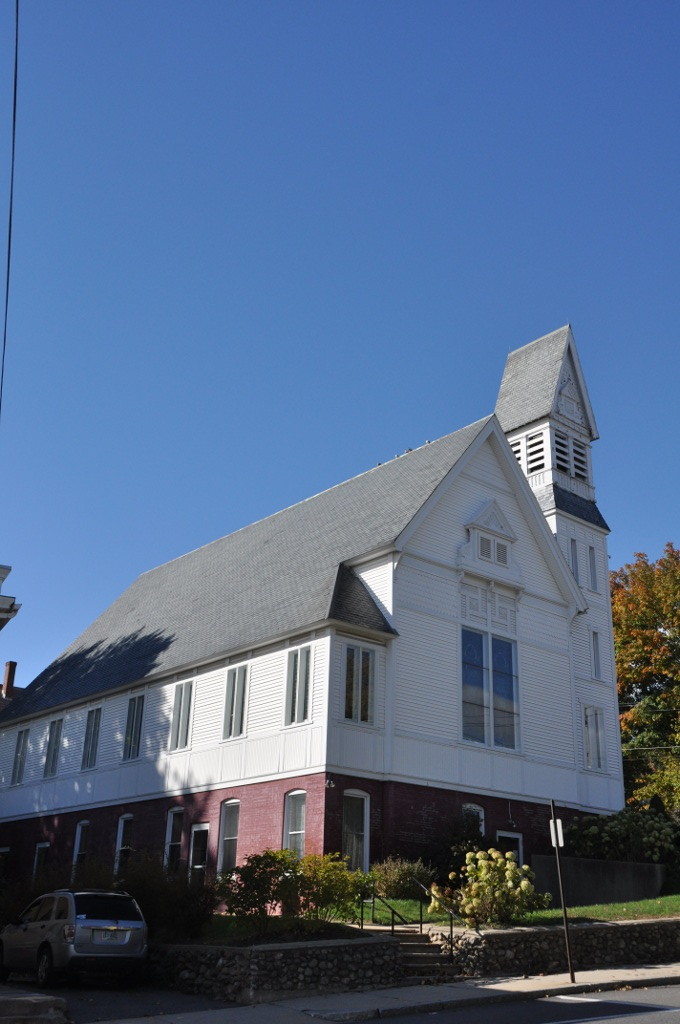
Memorial Congregational Church, Baldwinville, Massachusetts, 1881.

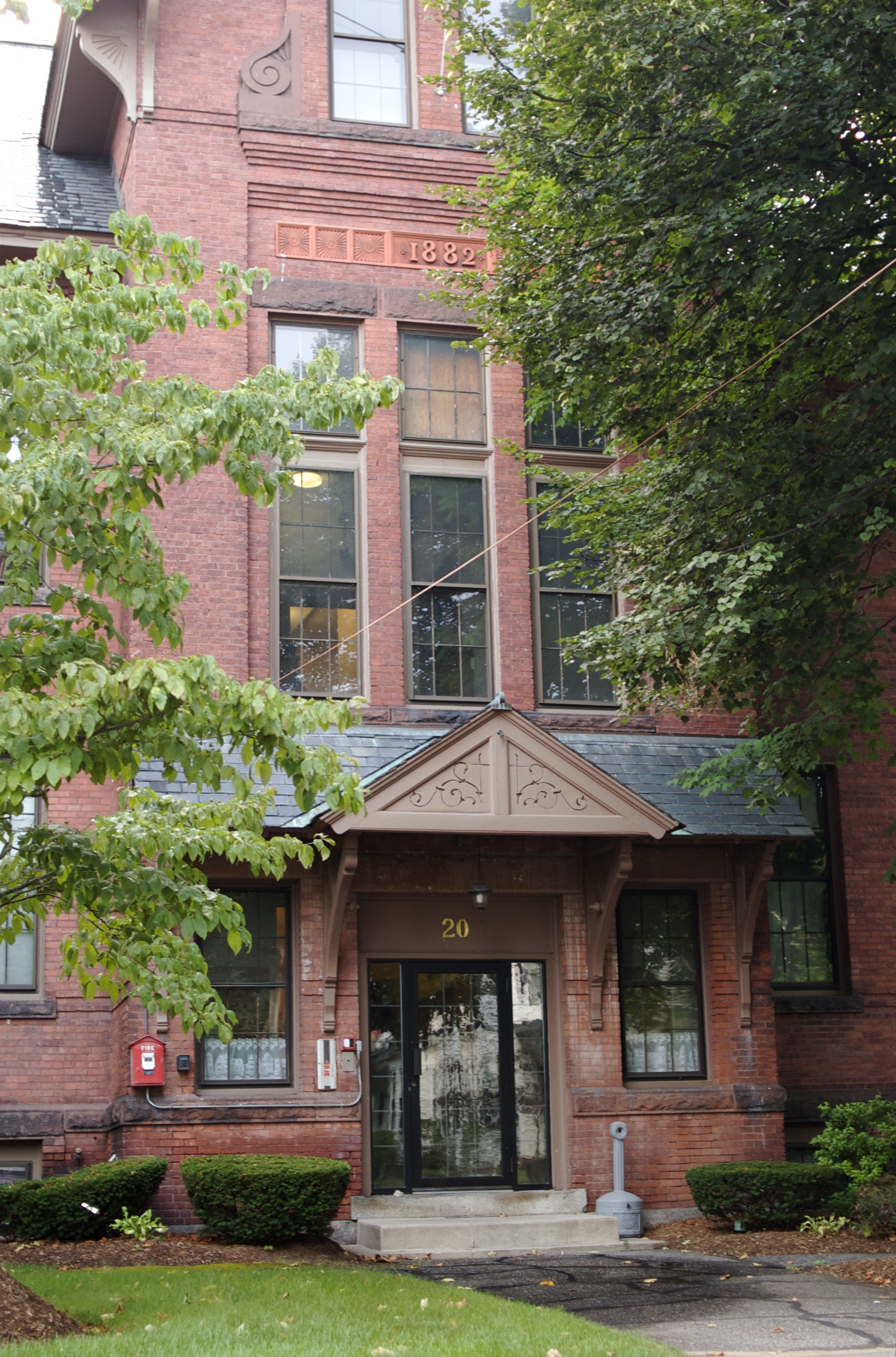
Hudson High School, Hudson, Massachusetts, 1882.

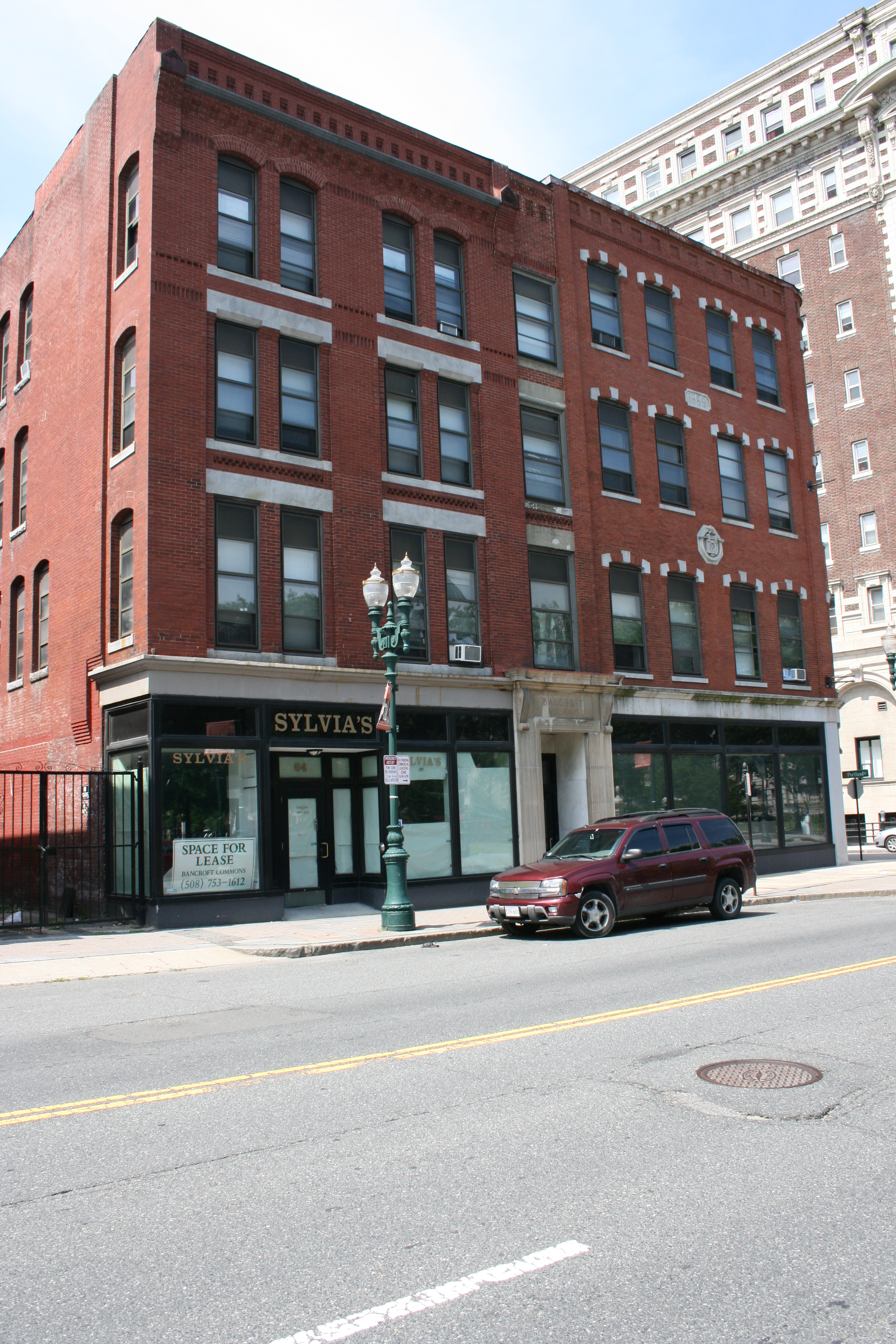
Sawyer Building, Worcester, Massachusetts, 1882.

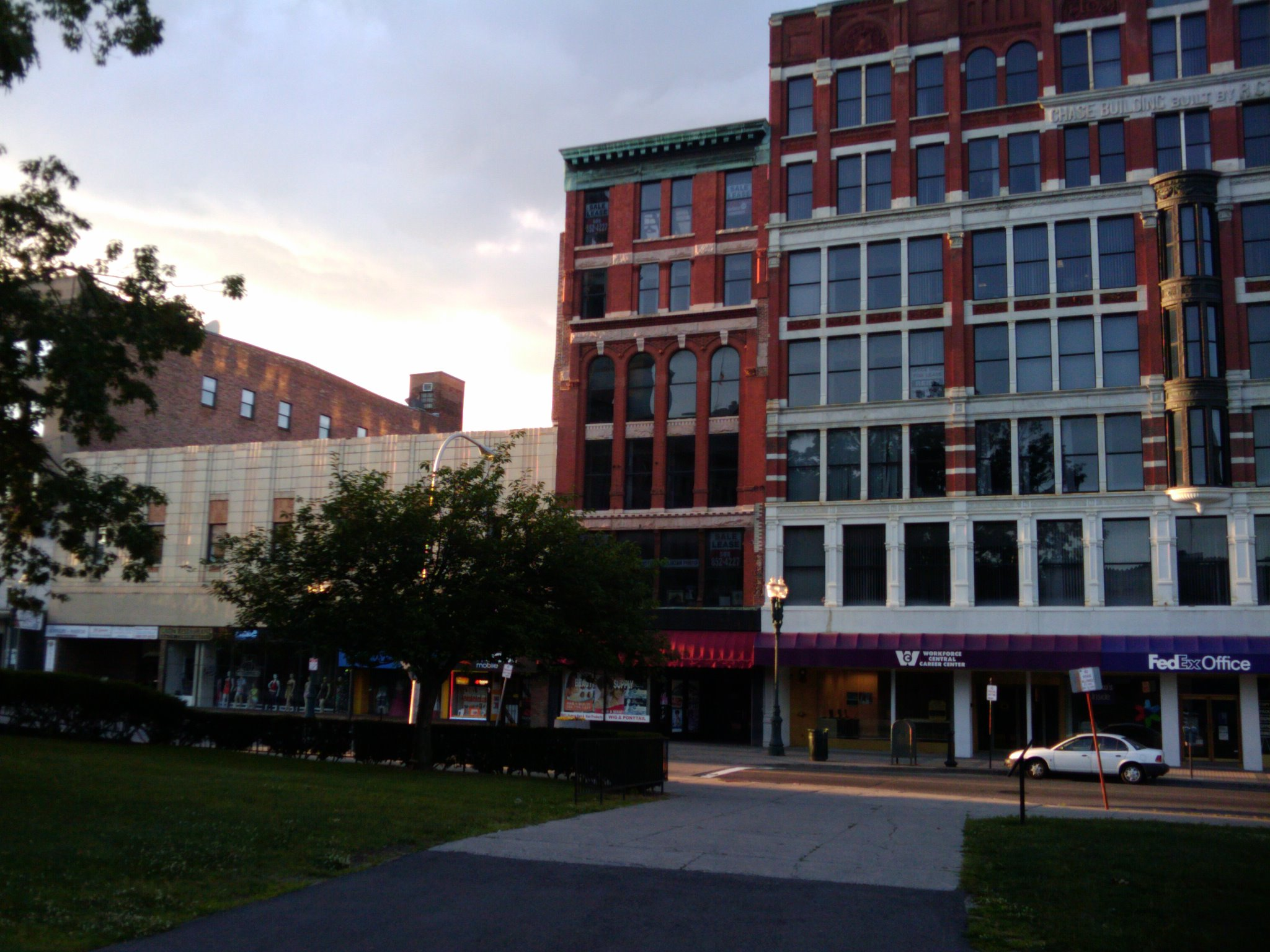
Office building for Ransom C. Taylor, Worcester, Massachusetts, 1883.

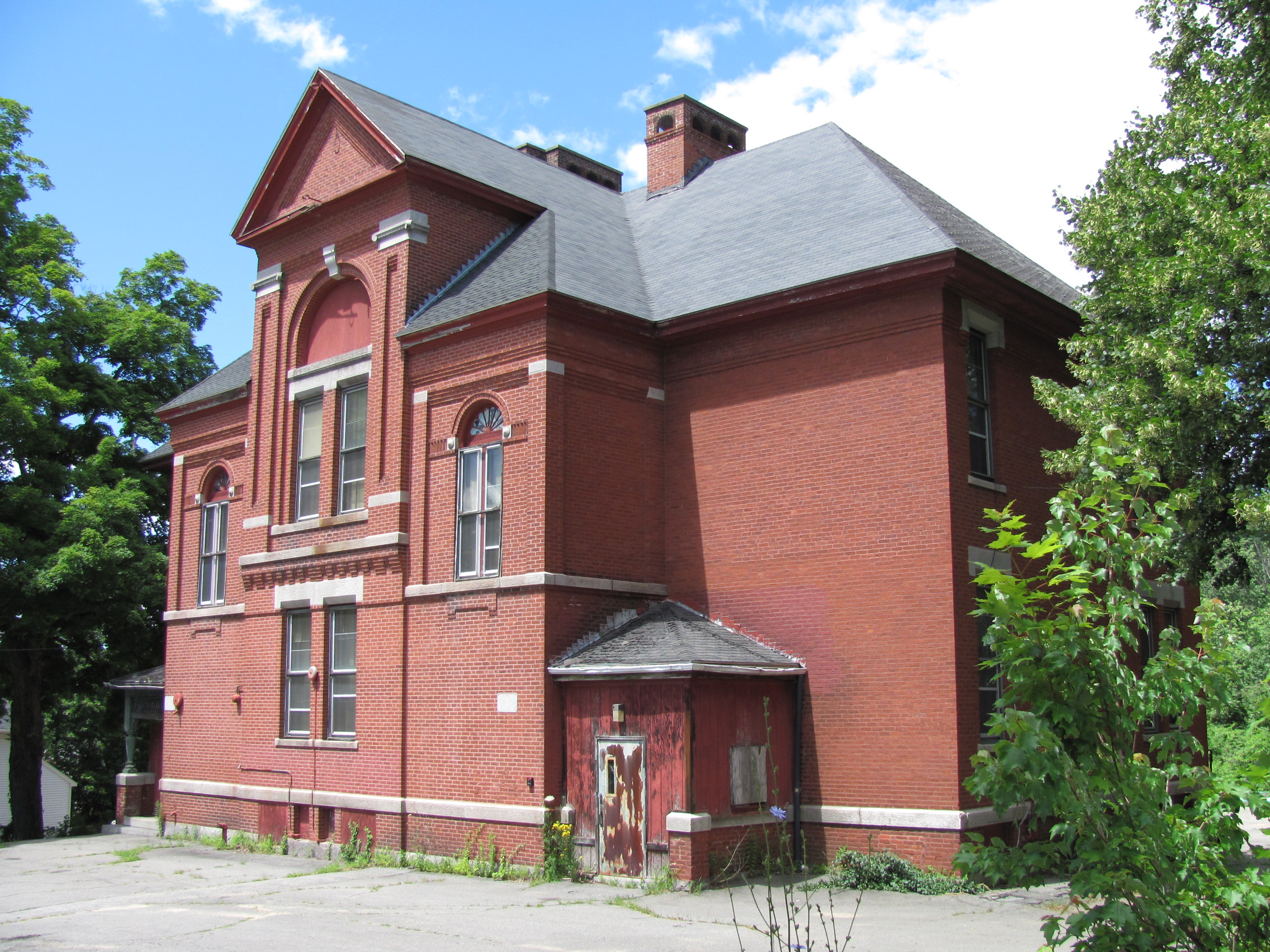
Pleasant Street School, Spencer, Massachusetts, 1883.

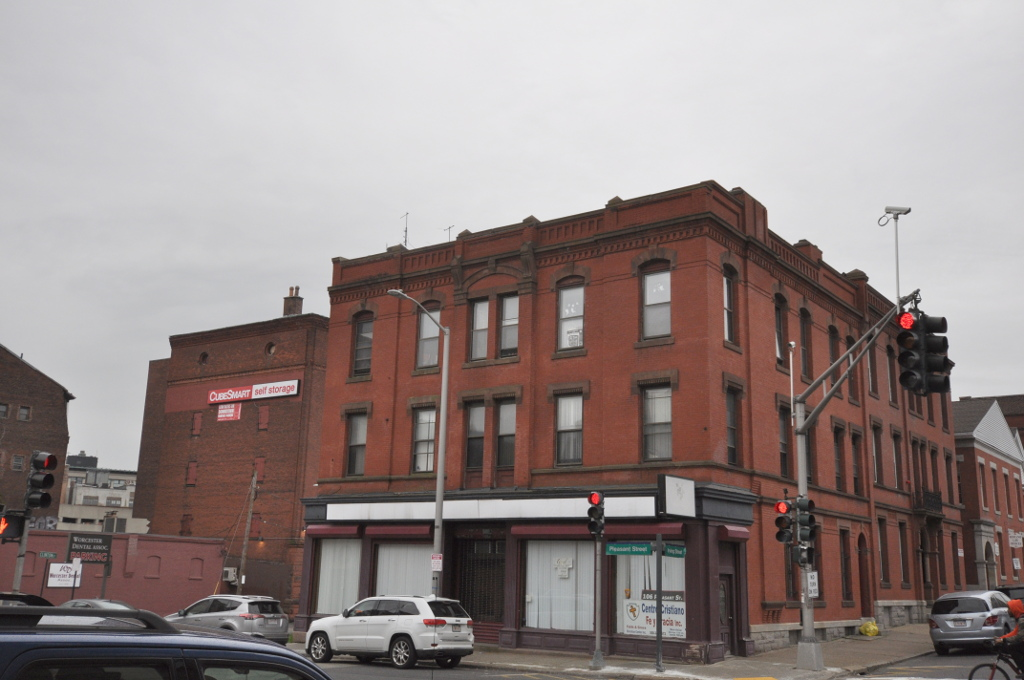
Robinson and Swan Blocks, Worcester, Massachusetts, 1884.

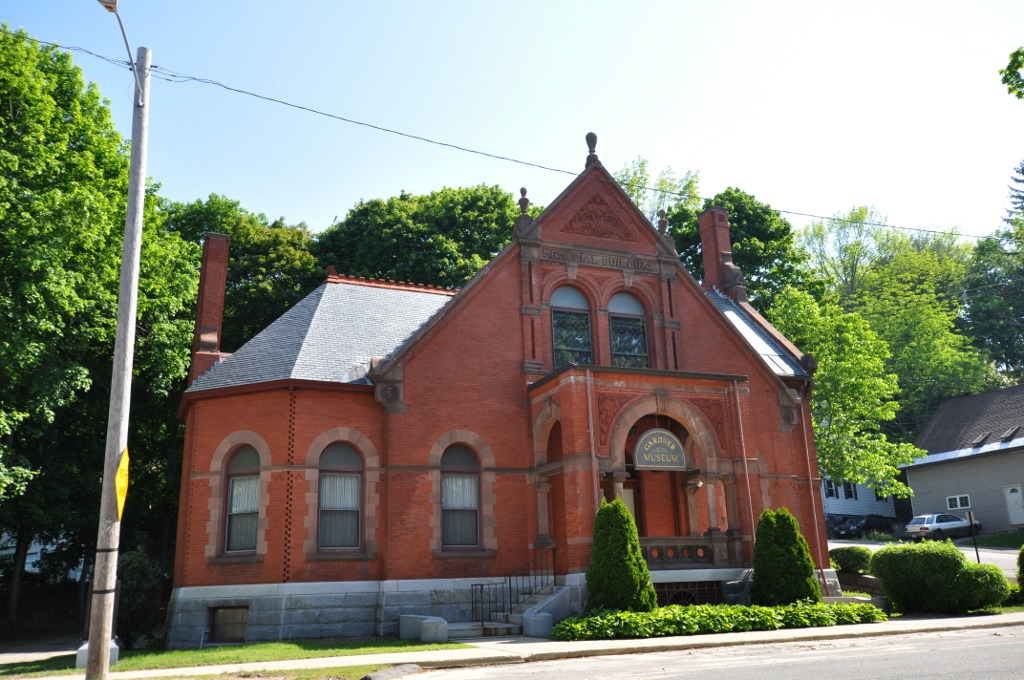
Levi Heywood Memorial Library Building, Gardner, Massachusetts, 1885.

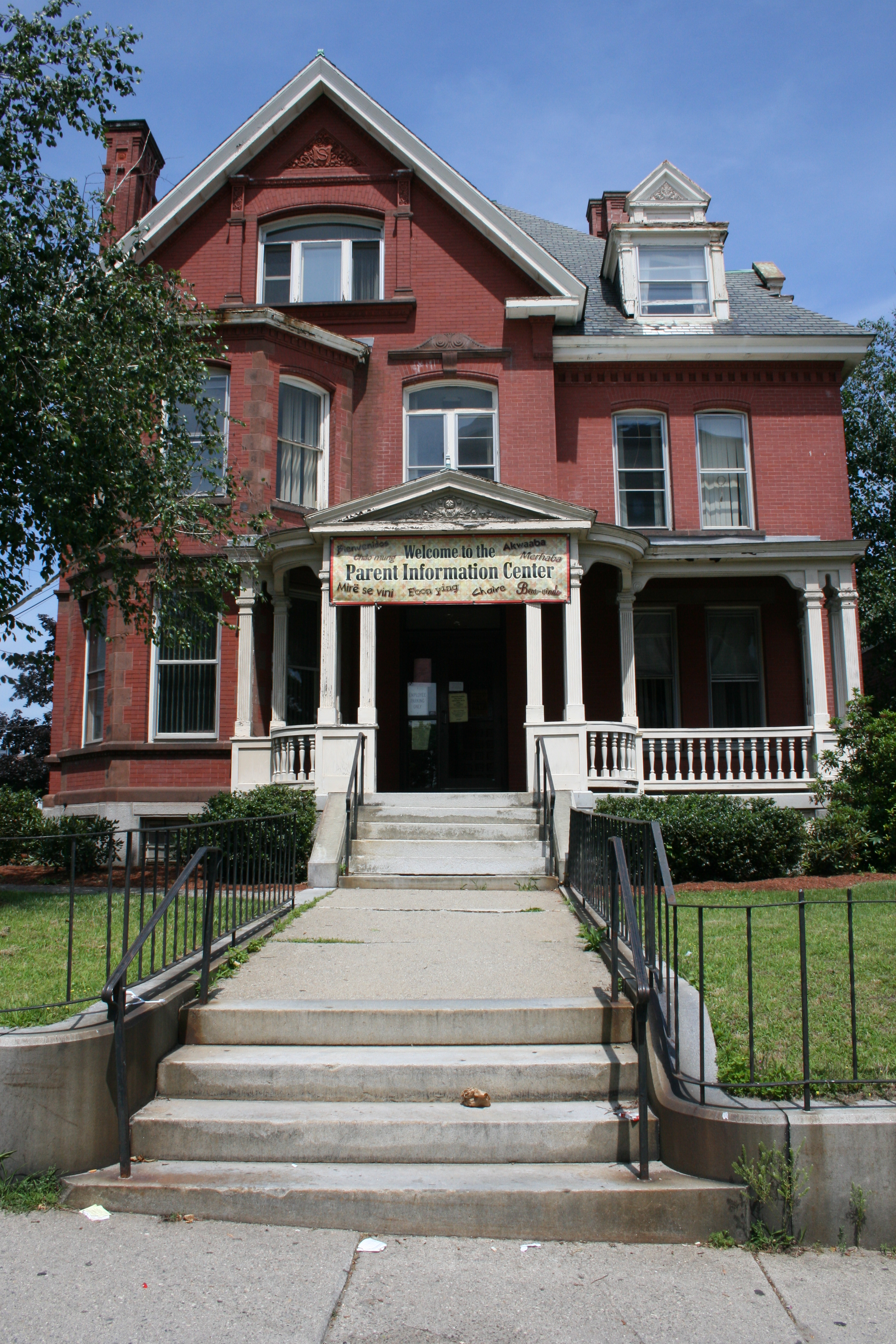
House for Moody E. Shattuck, Worcester, Massachusetts, 1885.

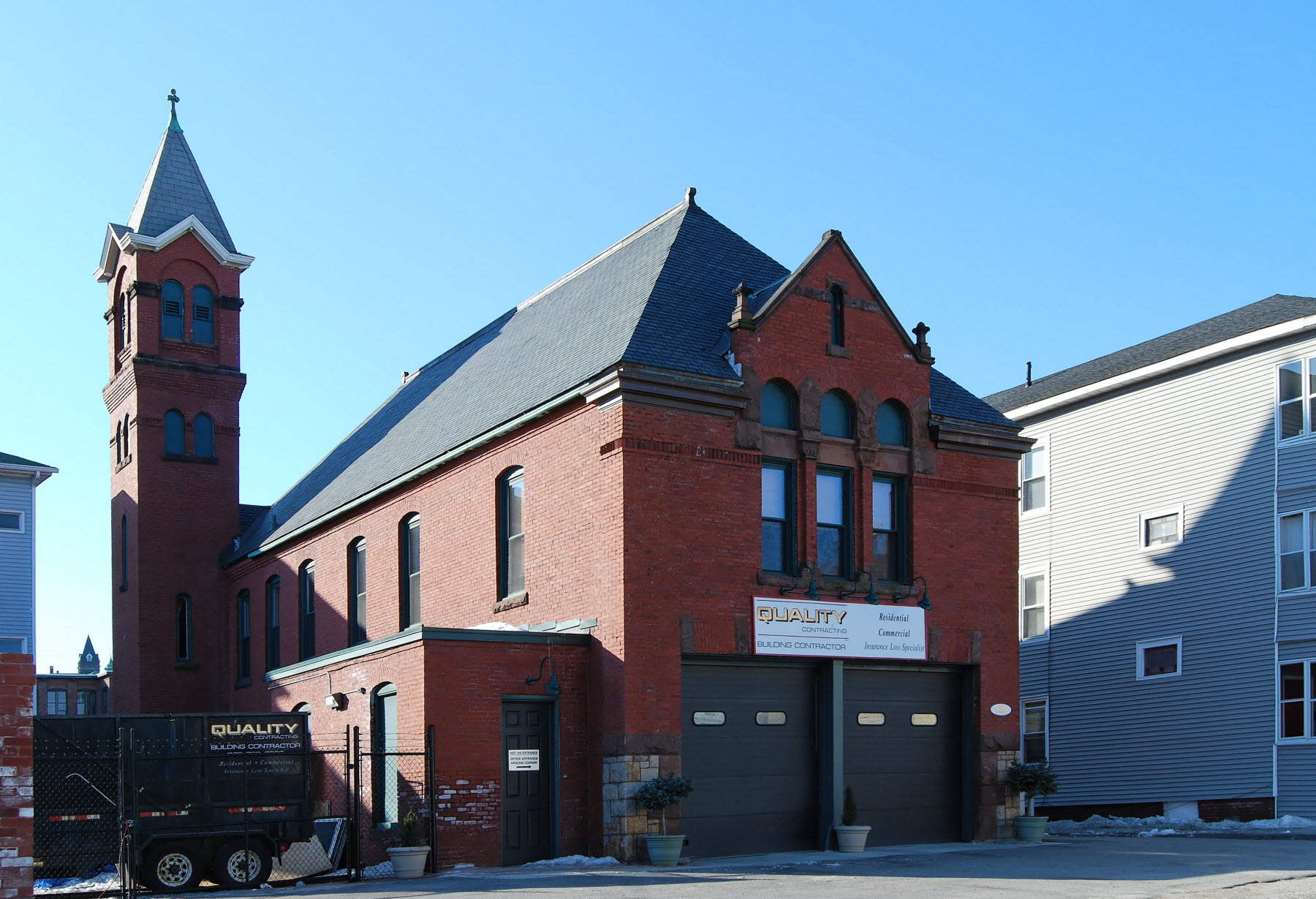
Cambridge Street Firehouse, Worcester, Massachusetts, 1886.

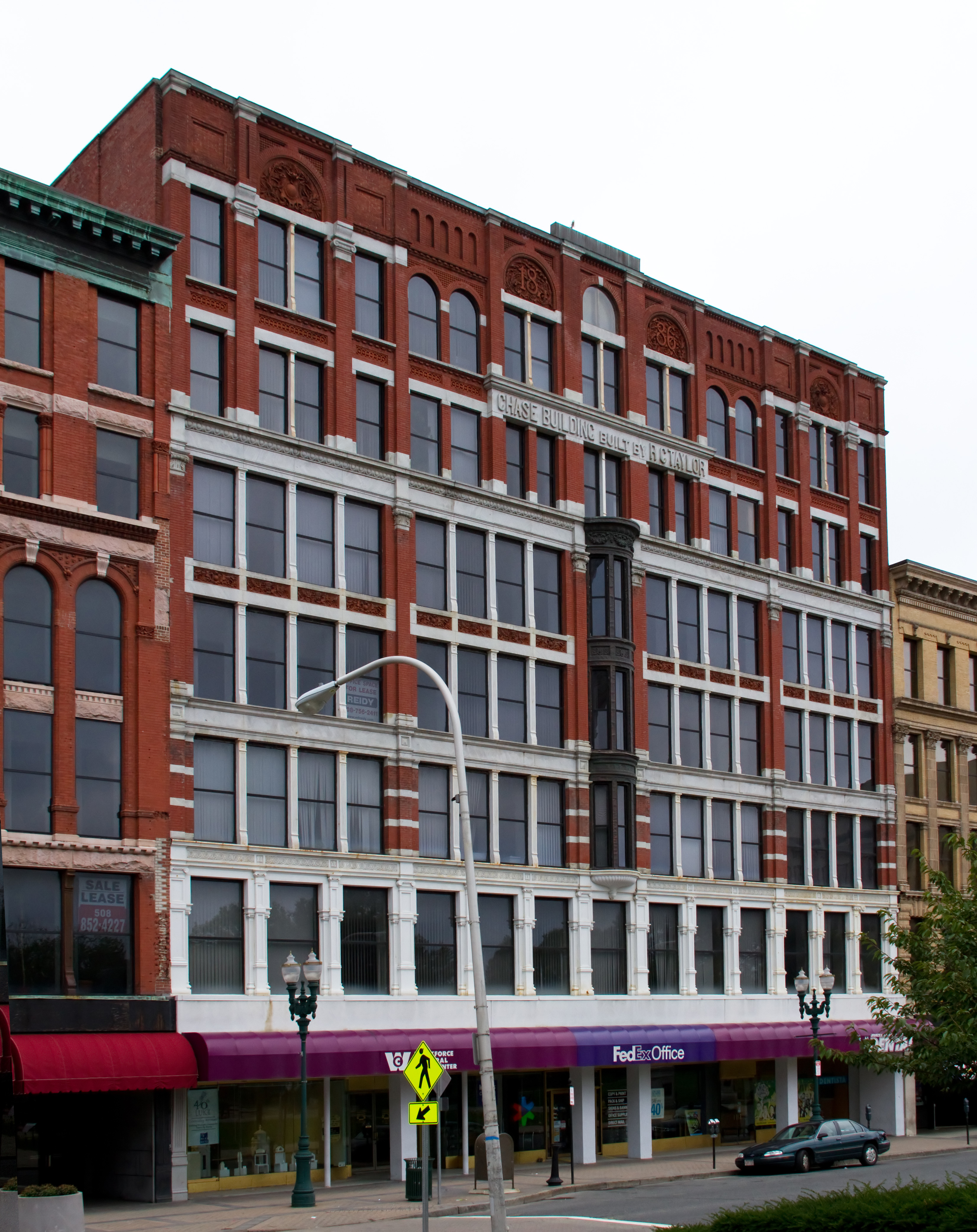
Chase Building, Worcester, Massachusetts, 1886.

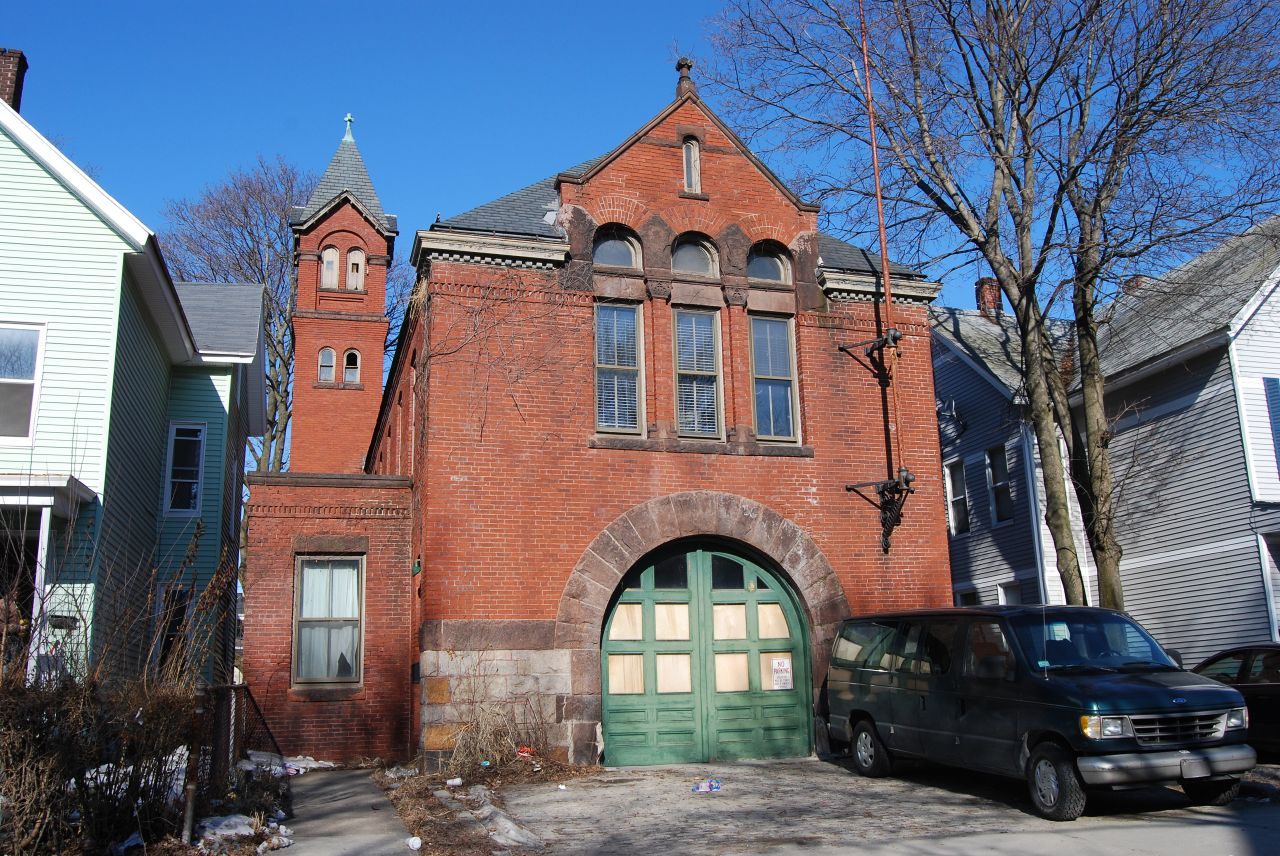
Woodland Street Firehouse, Worcester, Massachusetts, 1886.

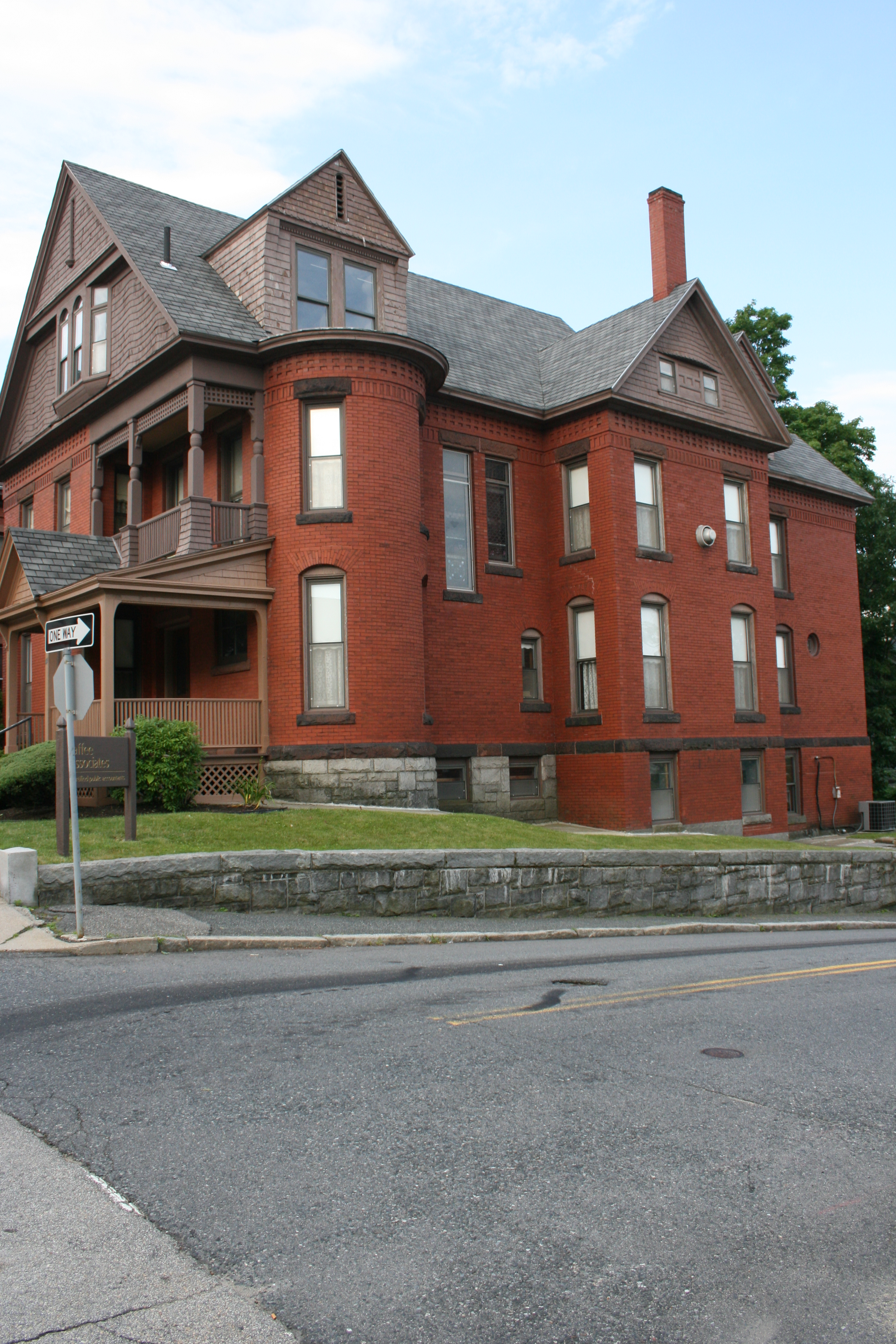
House for Otis E. Putnam, Worcester, Massachusetts, 1887.

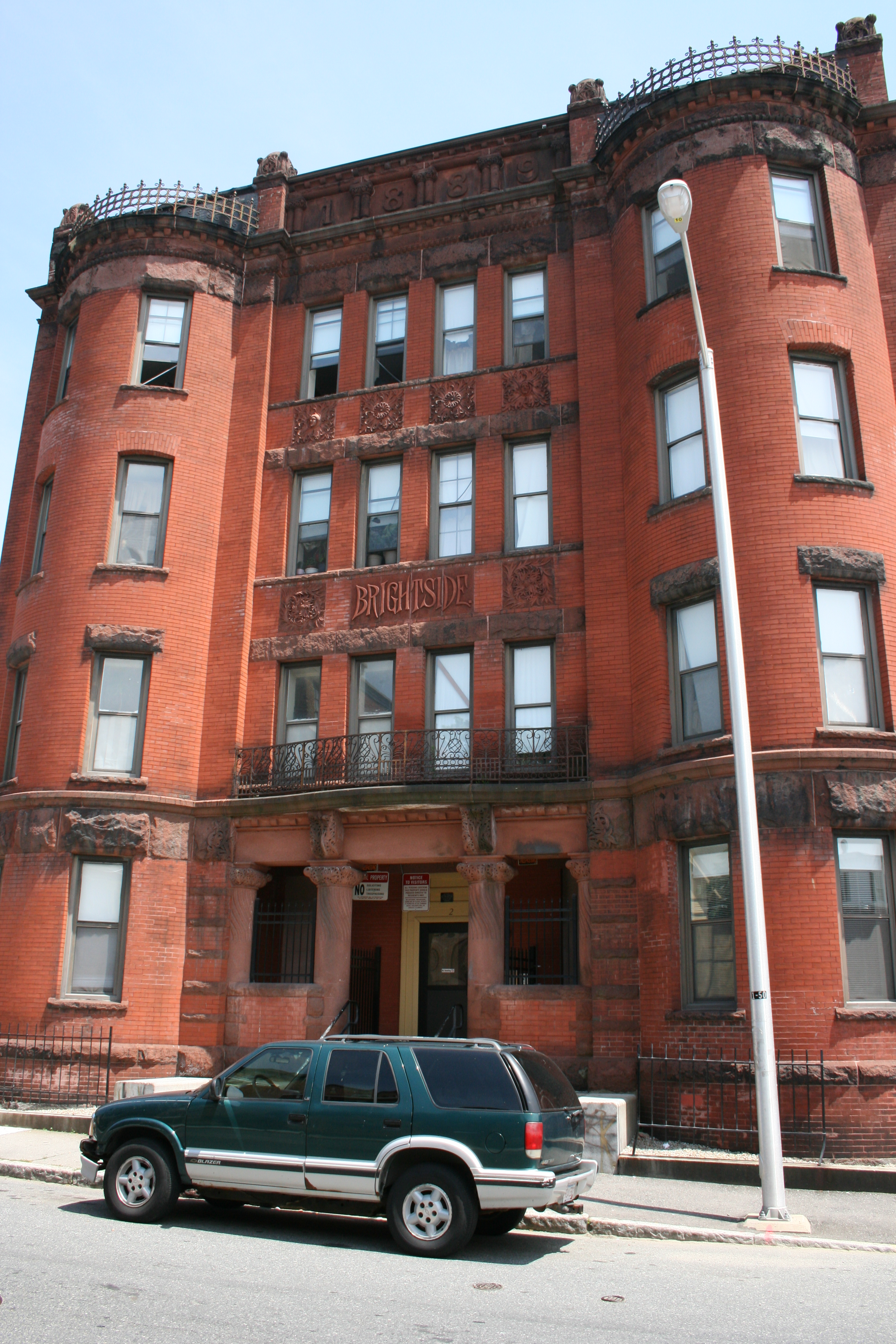
Brightside Apartments, Worcester, Massachusetts, 1888.

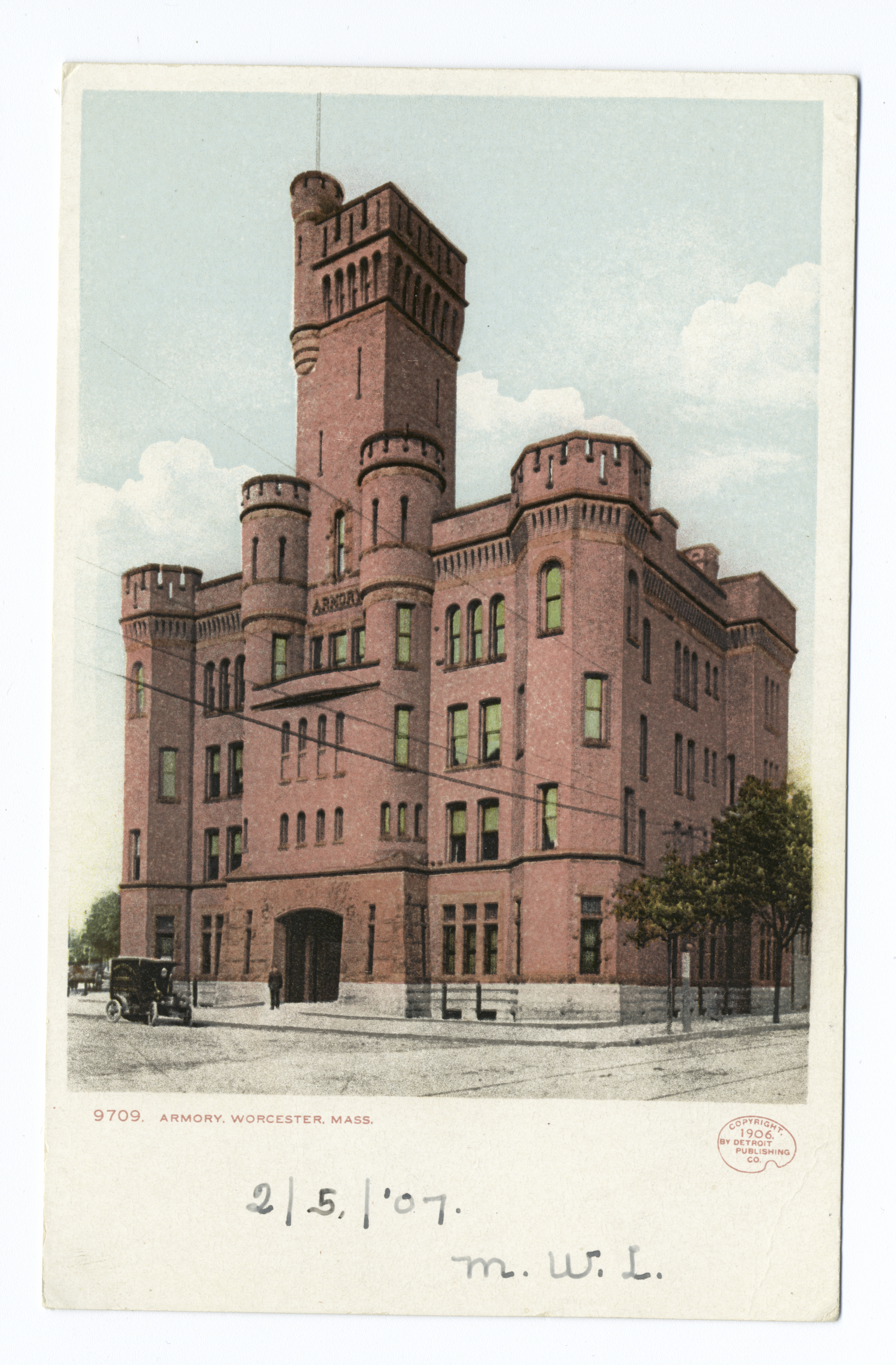
Worcester Armory, Worcester, Massachusetts, 1888-89 and 1907, shown prior to removal of tower.

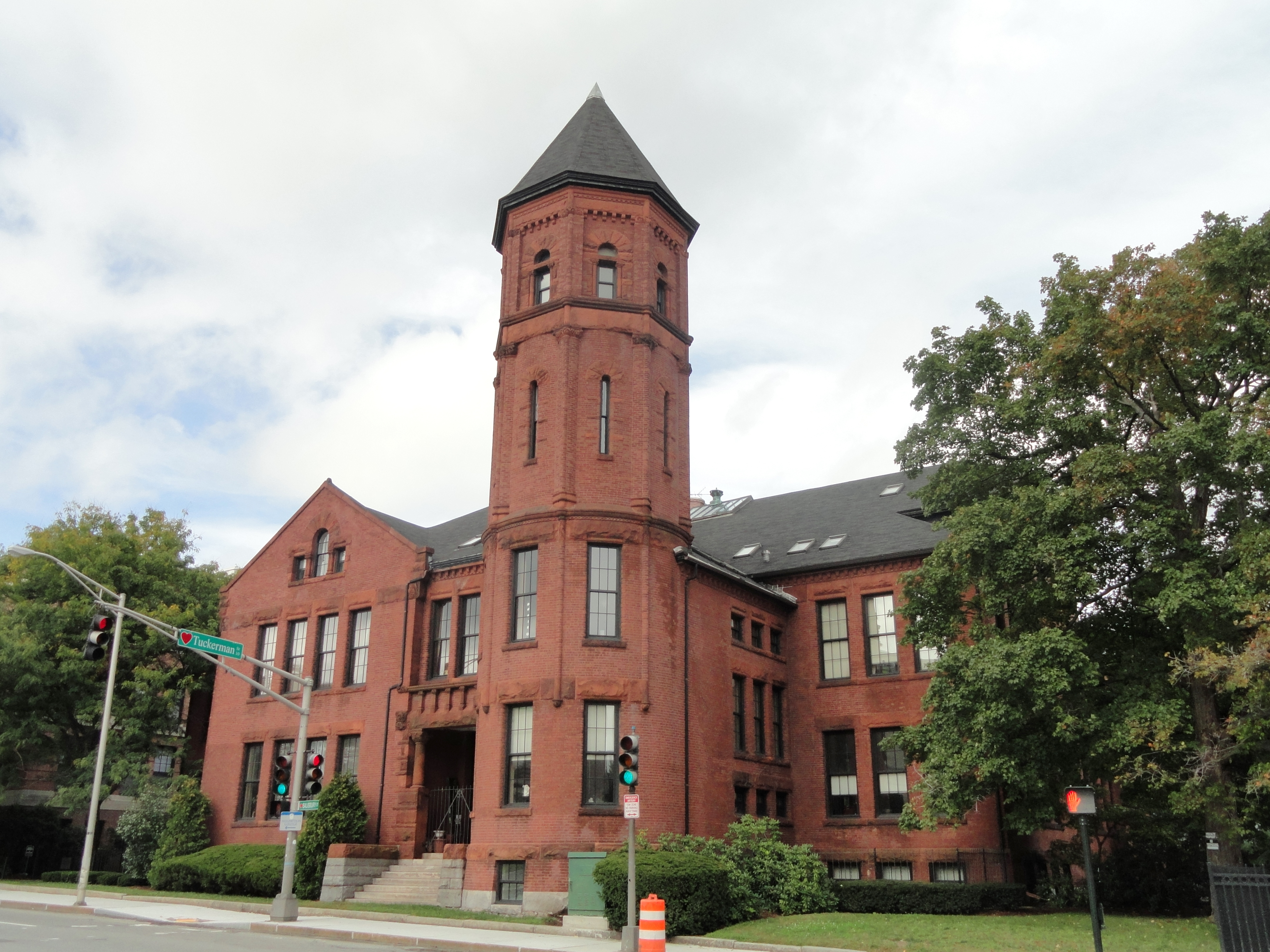
Salisbury Street School, Worcester, Massachusetts, 1889.

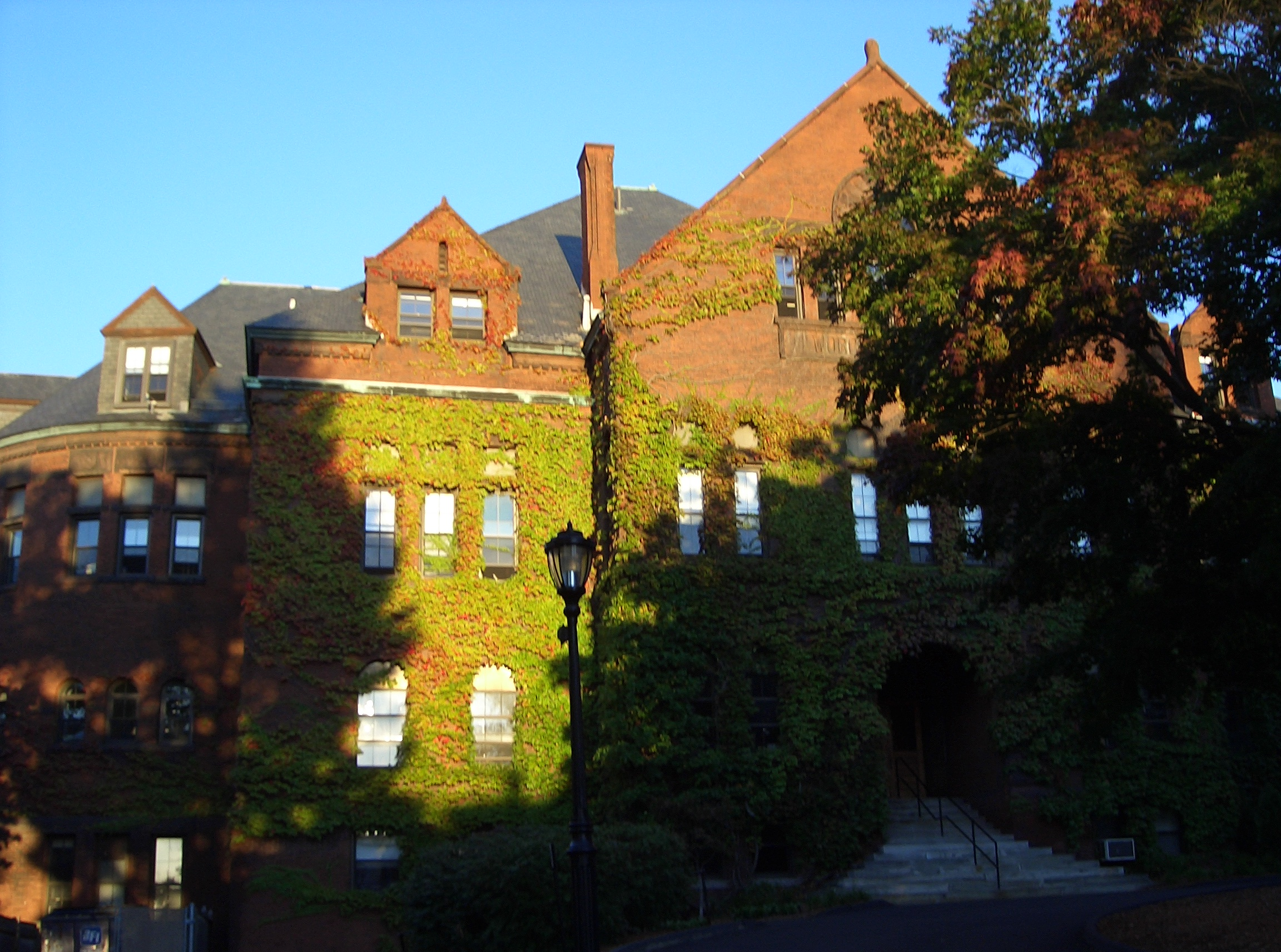
Walker Hall, Worcester Academy, Worcester, Massachusetts, 1889.

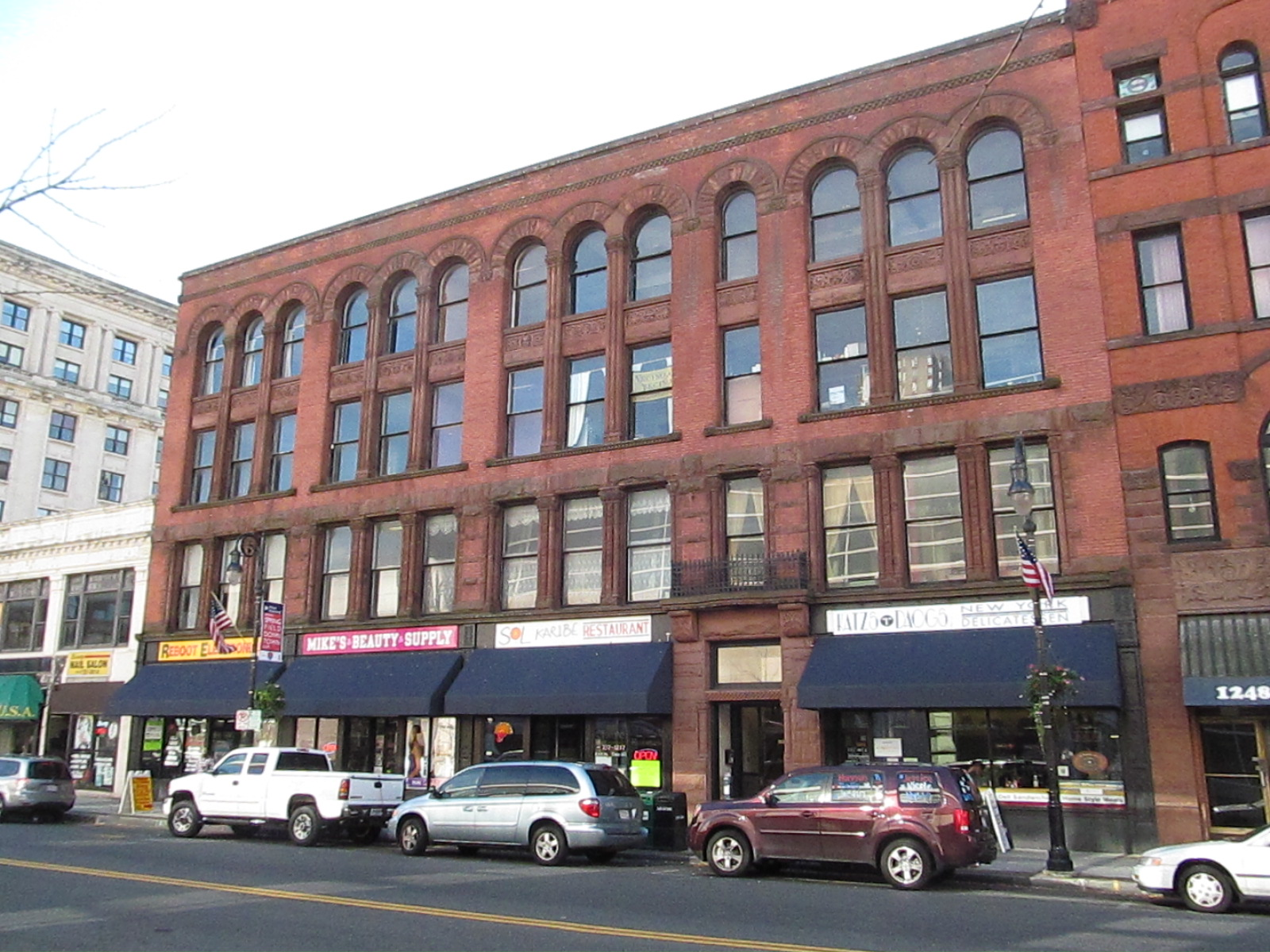
Walker Building, Springfield, Massachusetts, 1890.

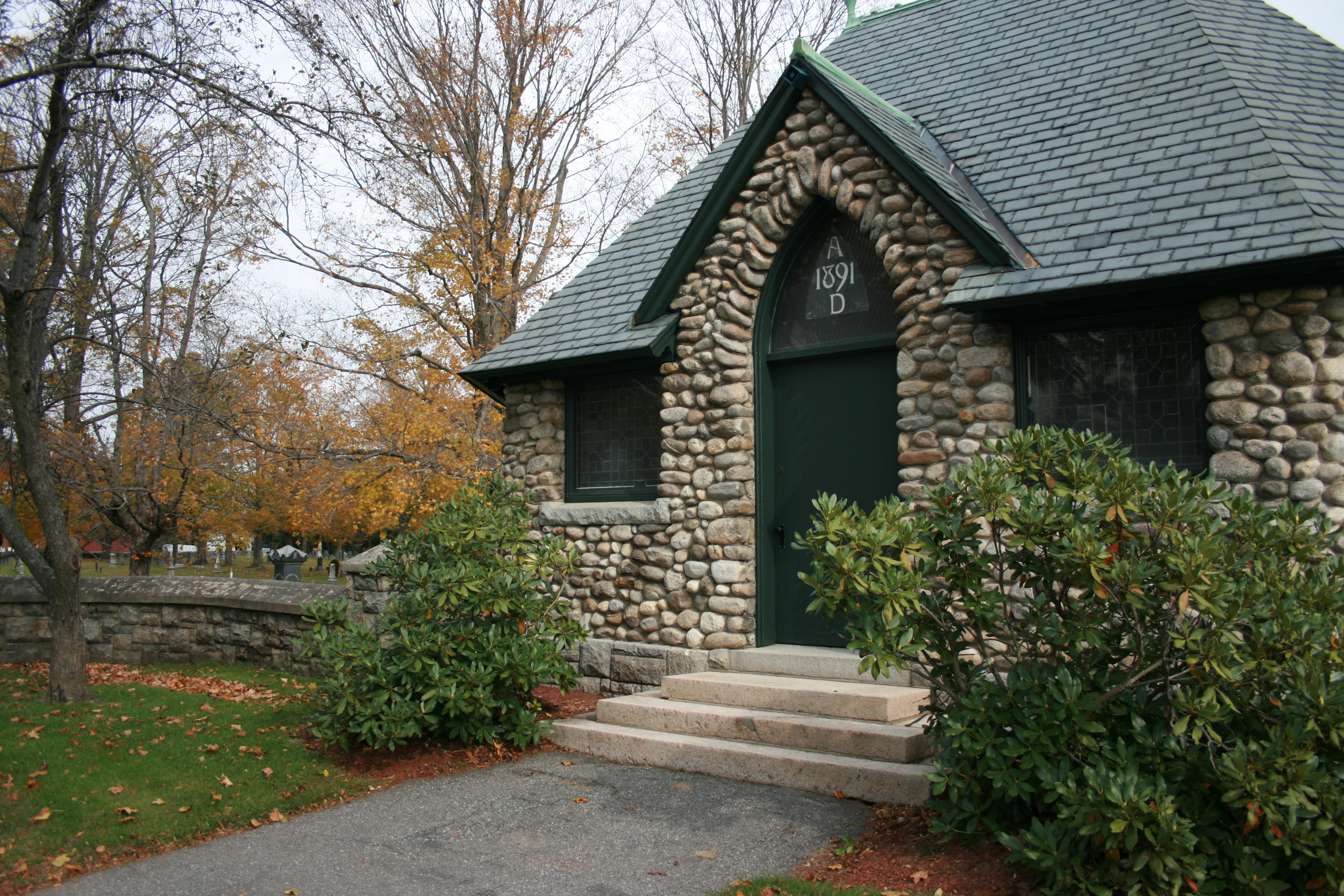
Holbrook Memorial Chapel, Mount Vernon Cemetery, West Boylston, Massachusetts, 1891.

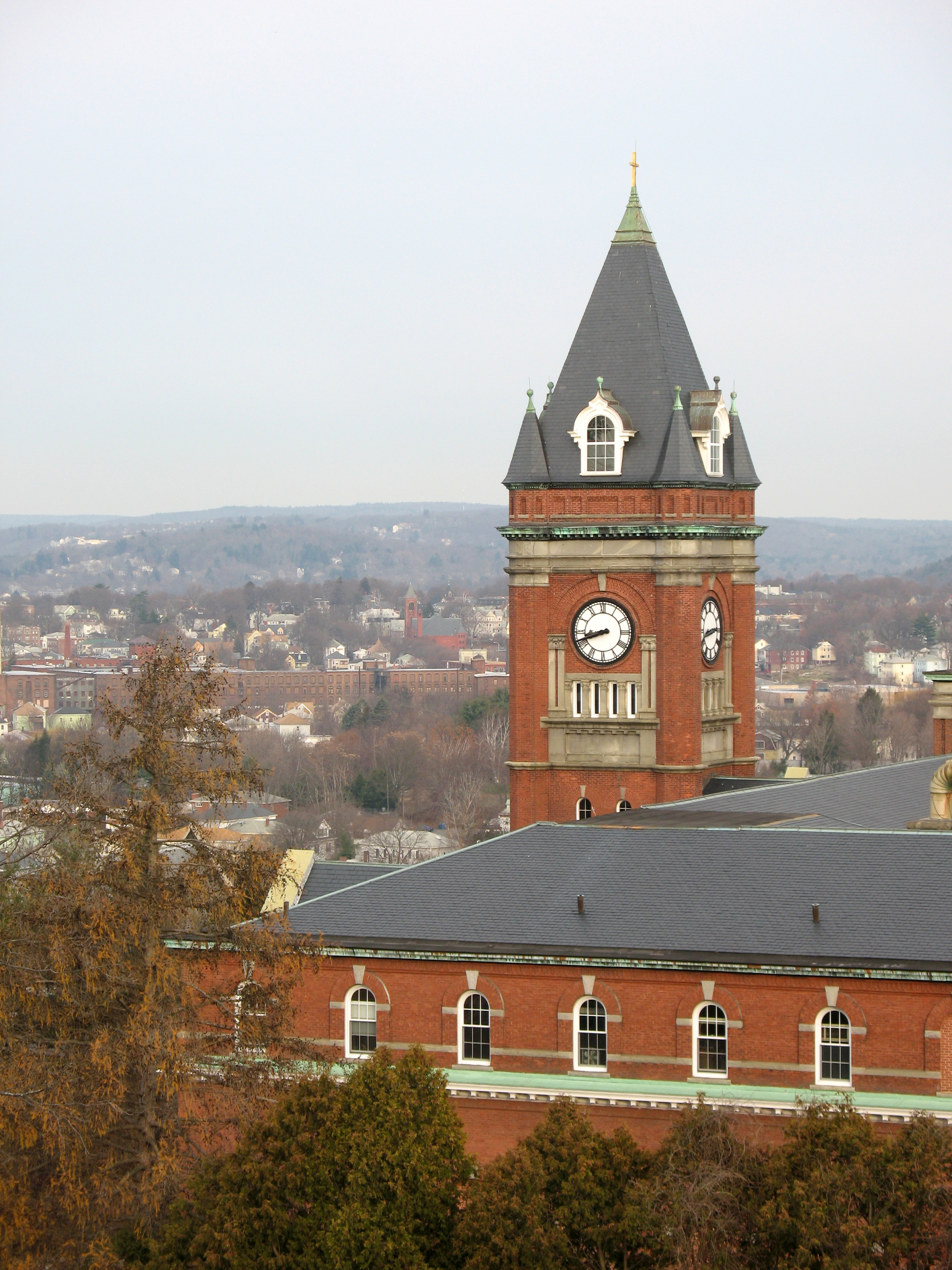
O'Kane Hall, College of the Holy Cross, Worcester, Massachusetts, 1891-95.

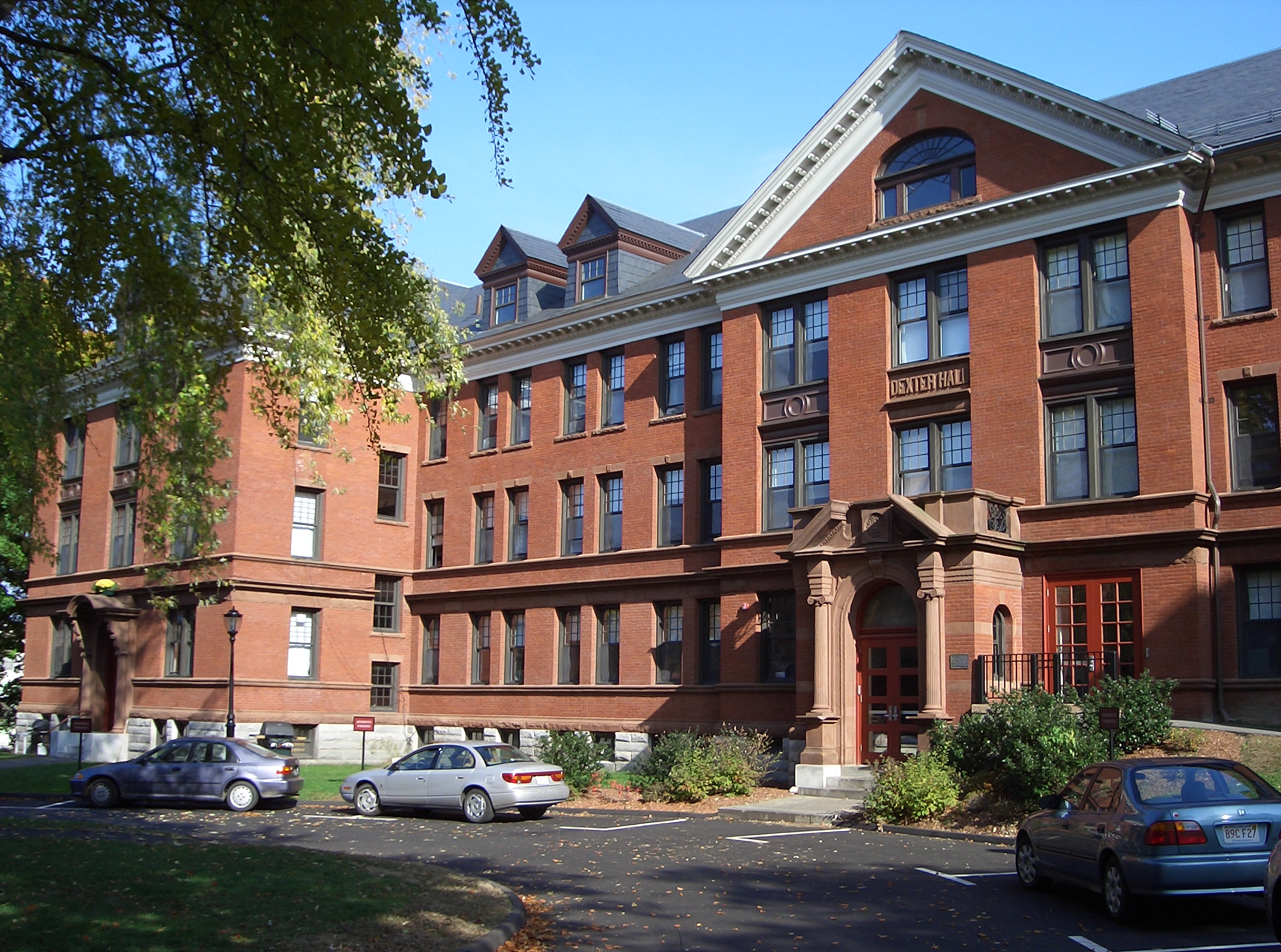
Dexter Hall, Worcester Academy, Worcester, Massachusetts, 1892.

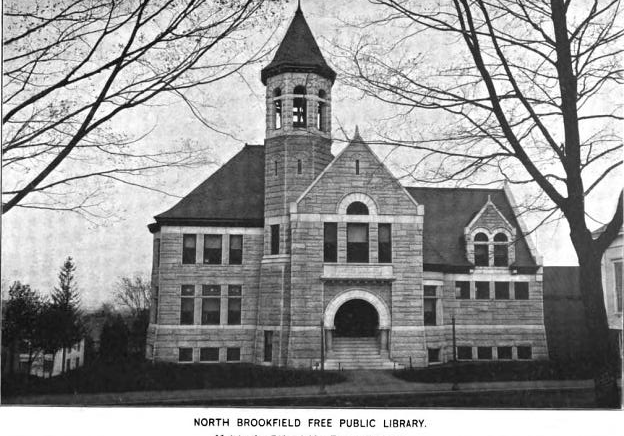
Haston Free Public Library, North Brookfield, Massachusetts, 1893.

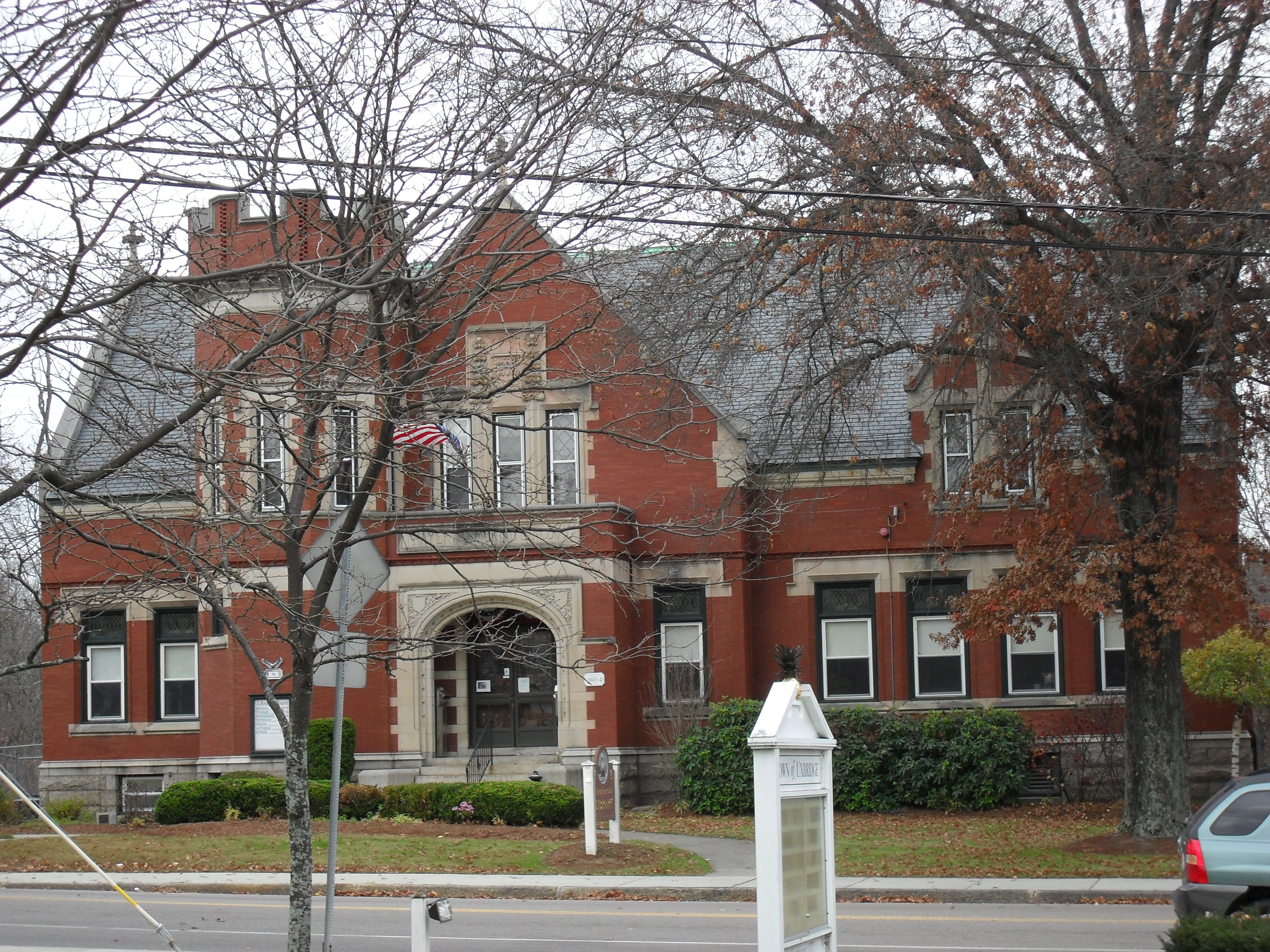
Uxbridge Free Public Library, Uxbridge, Massachusetts, 1893.

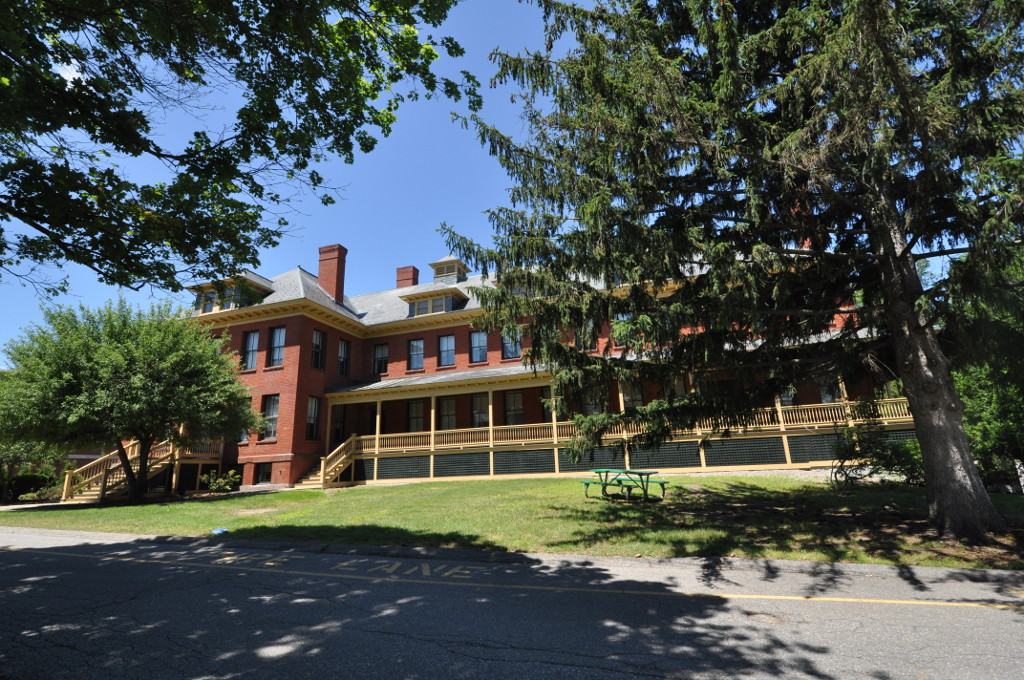
Farmhouse, Worcester State Hospital, 1894-95.

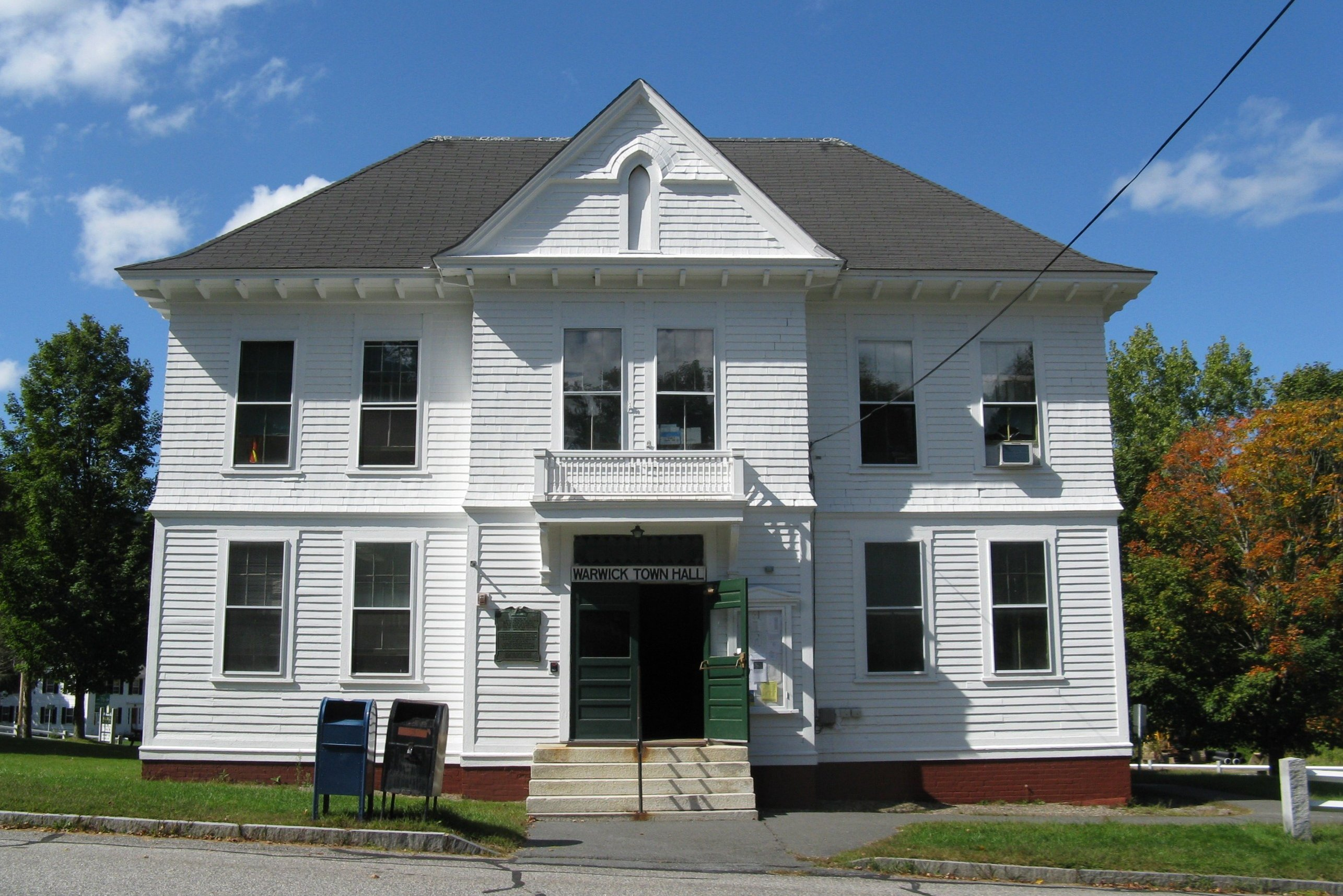
Warwick Town Hall, Warwick, Massachusetts, 1894-95.

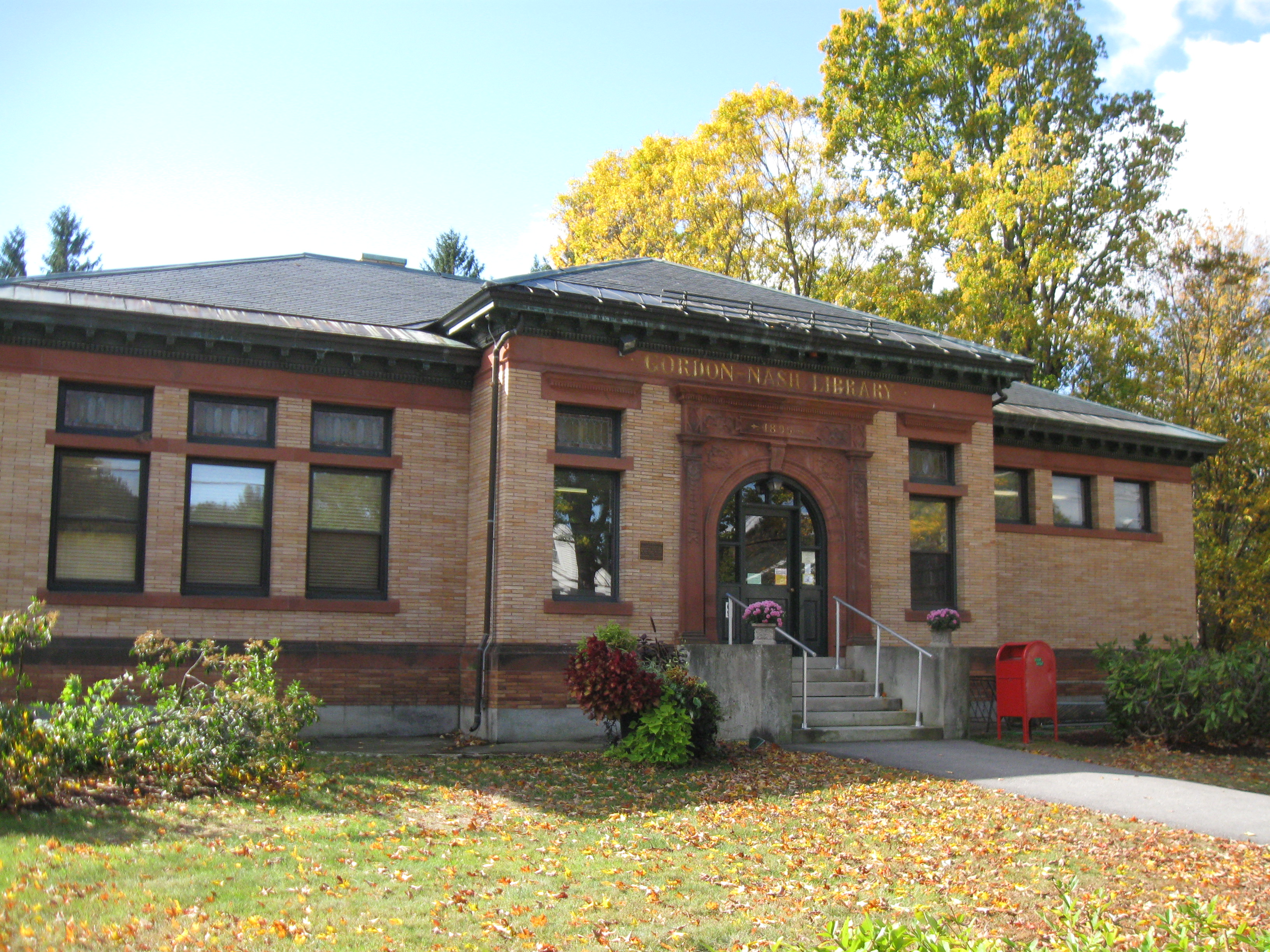
Gordon-Nash Library, New Hampton, New Hampshire, 1895.

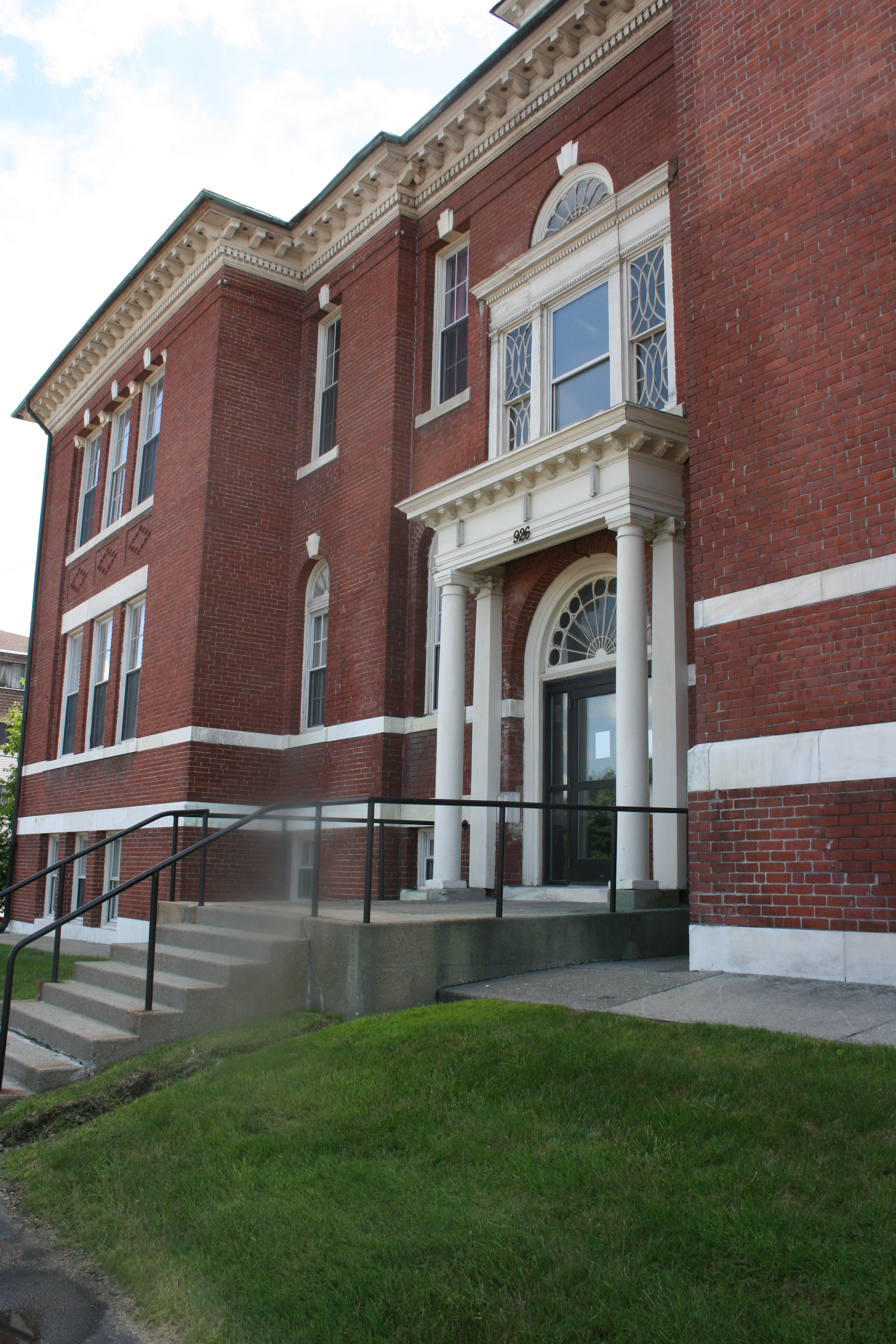
Malvern Road School, Worcester, Massachusetts, 1896.

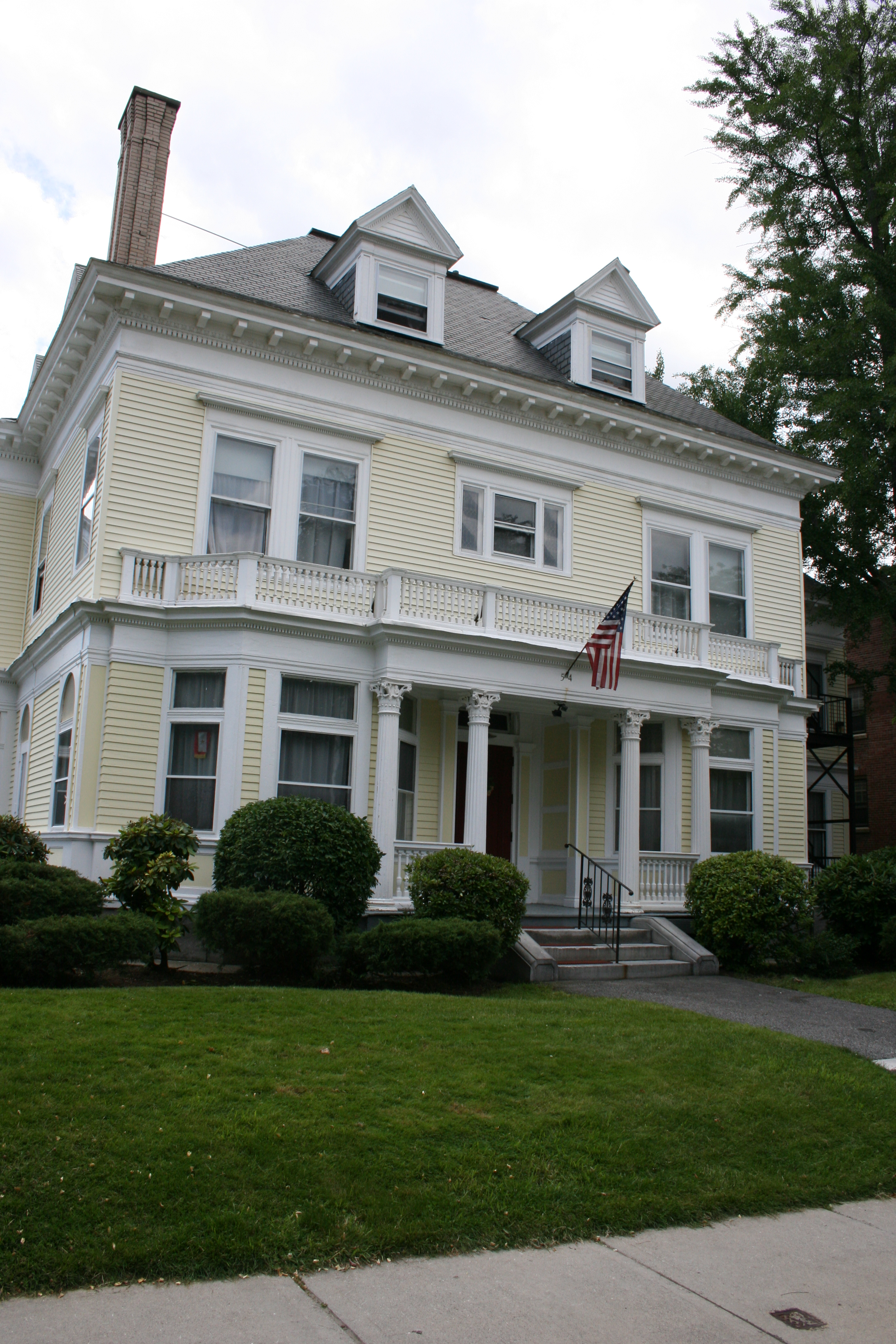
House for William J. Hogg, Worcester, Massachusetts, 1897.

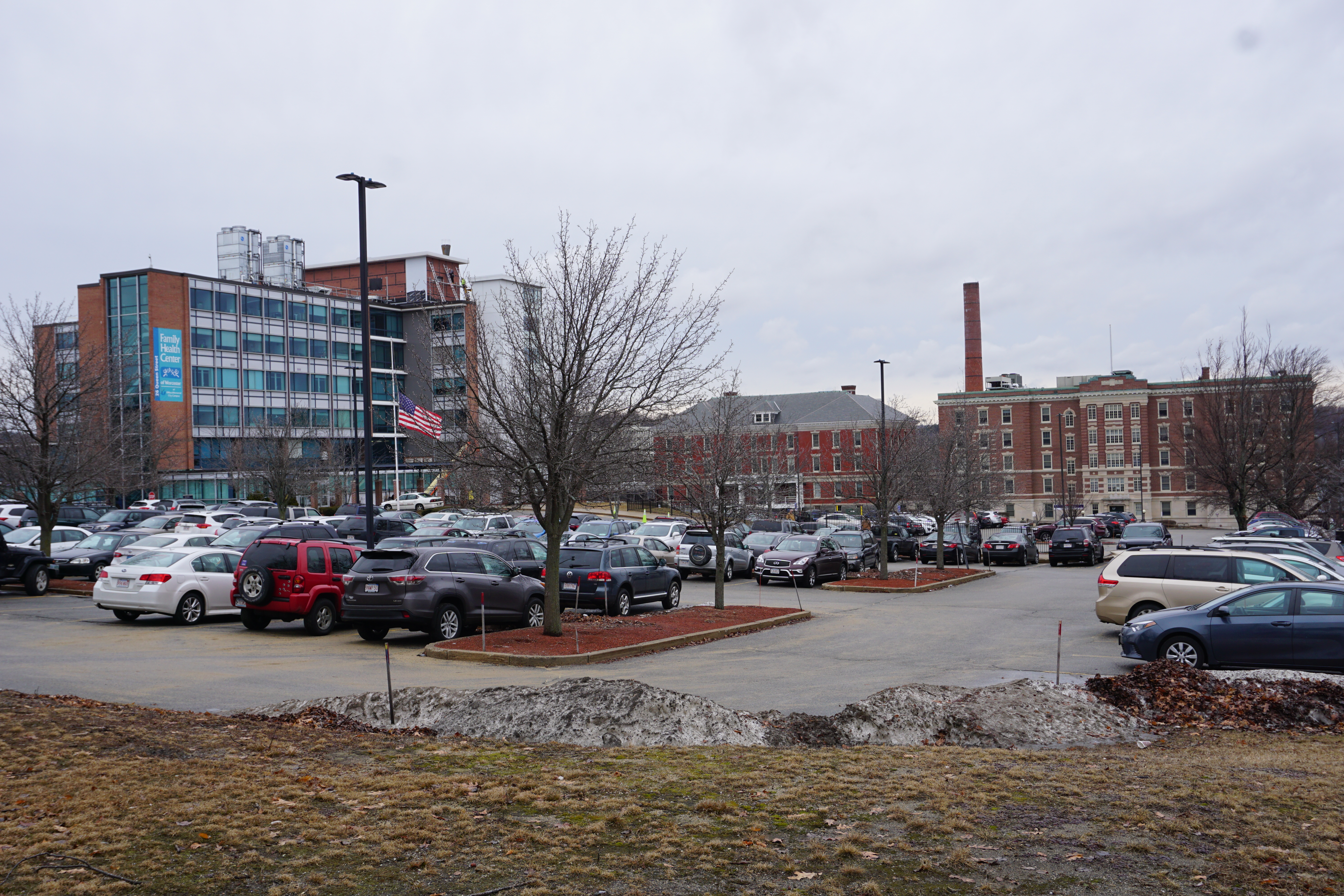
Memorial Home for Nurses (center) and Thayer Hall (right), Worcester City Hospital, Worcester, Massachusetts, 1897 and 1927.

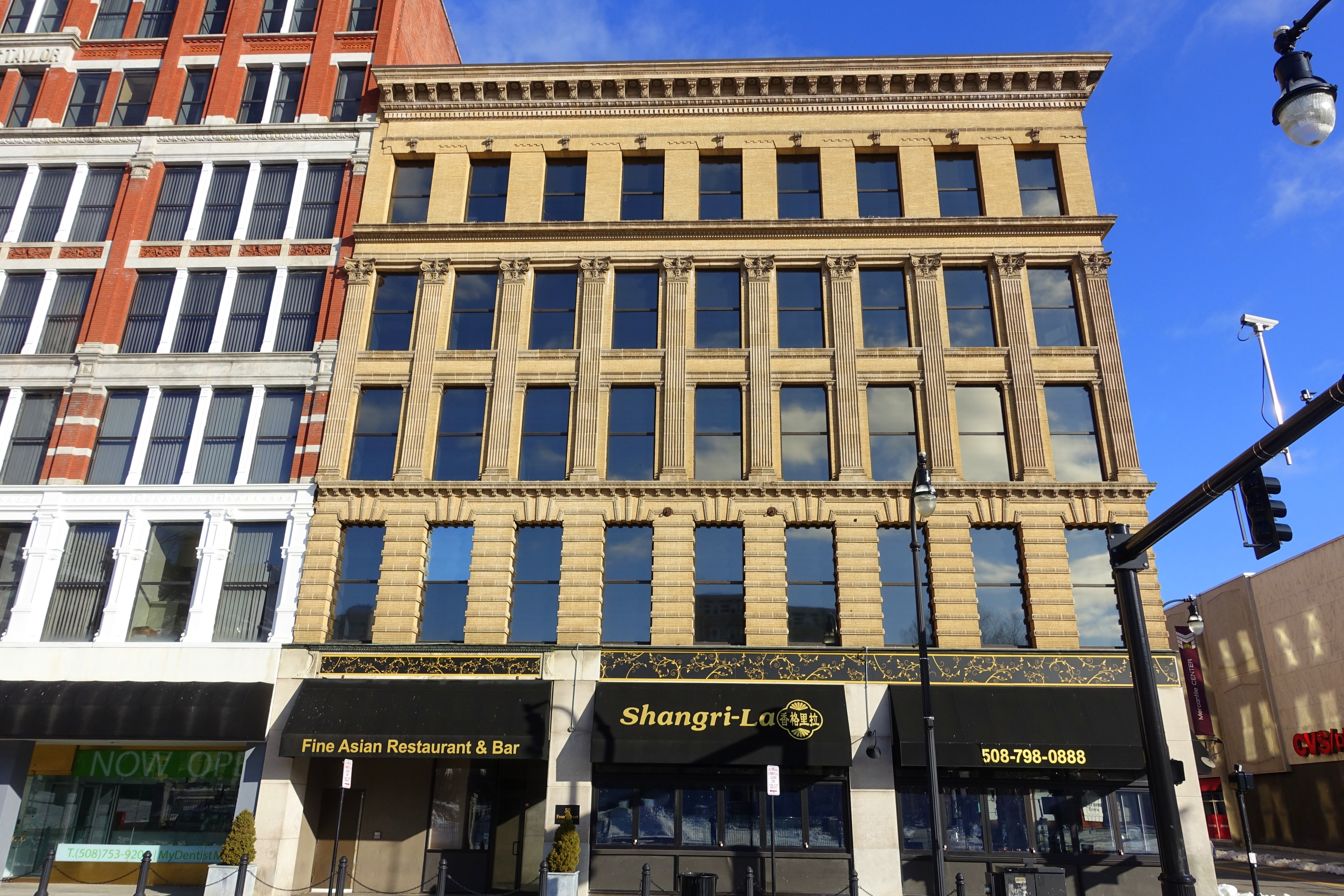
Office building for Ransom C. Taylor, Worcester, Massachusetts, 1897.

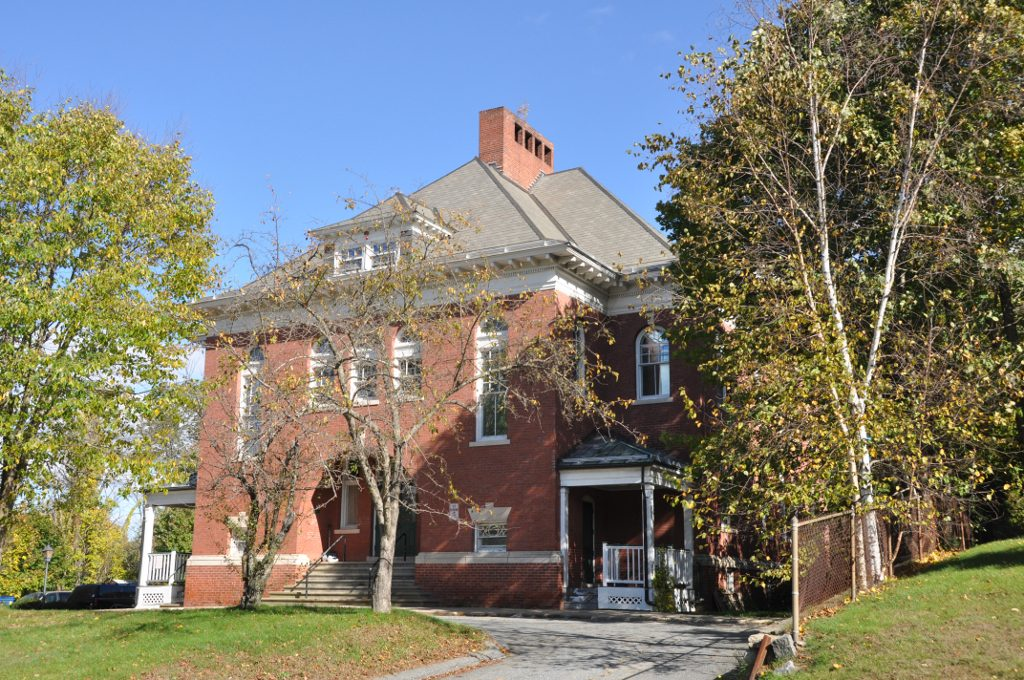
Baldwinville School, Baldwinville, Massachusetts, 1898.

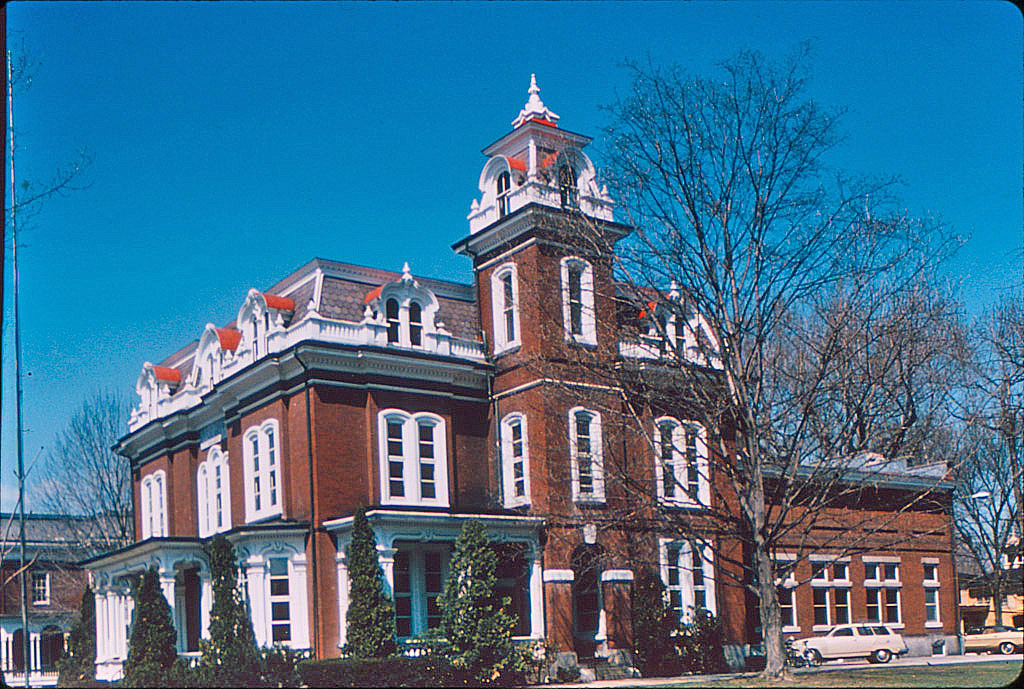
Keene Public Library, Keene, New Hampshire, 1898.

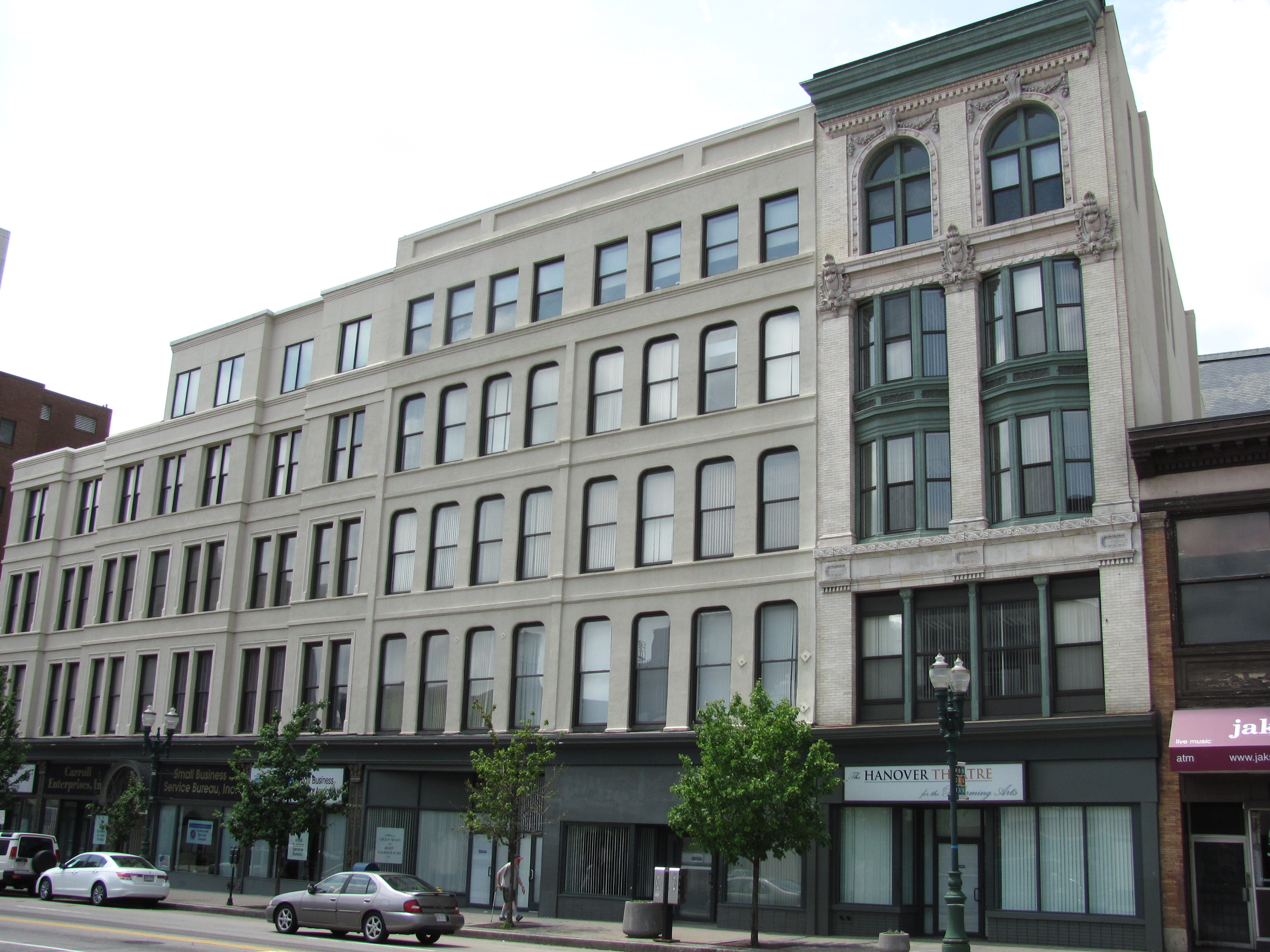
Enterprise Building (right), Worcester, Massachusetts, 1900.

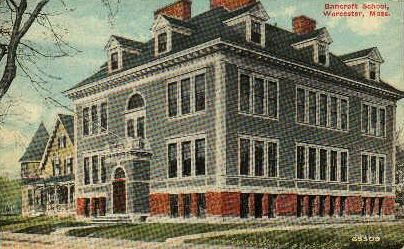
Bancroft School, Worcester, Massachusetts, 1902.

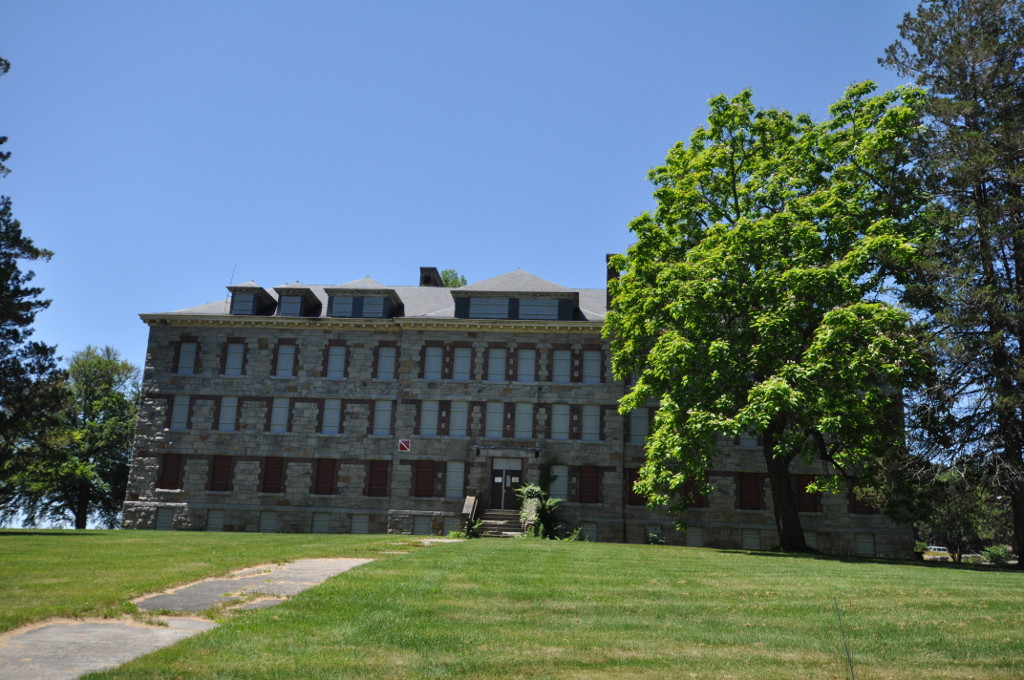
Nurses' Home, Worcester State Hospital, Worcester, Massachusetts, 1902-03.

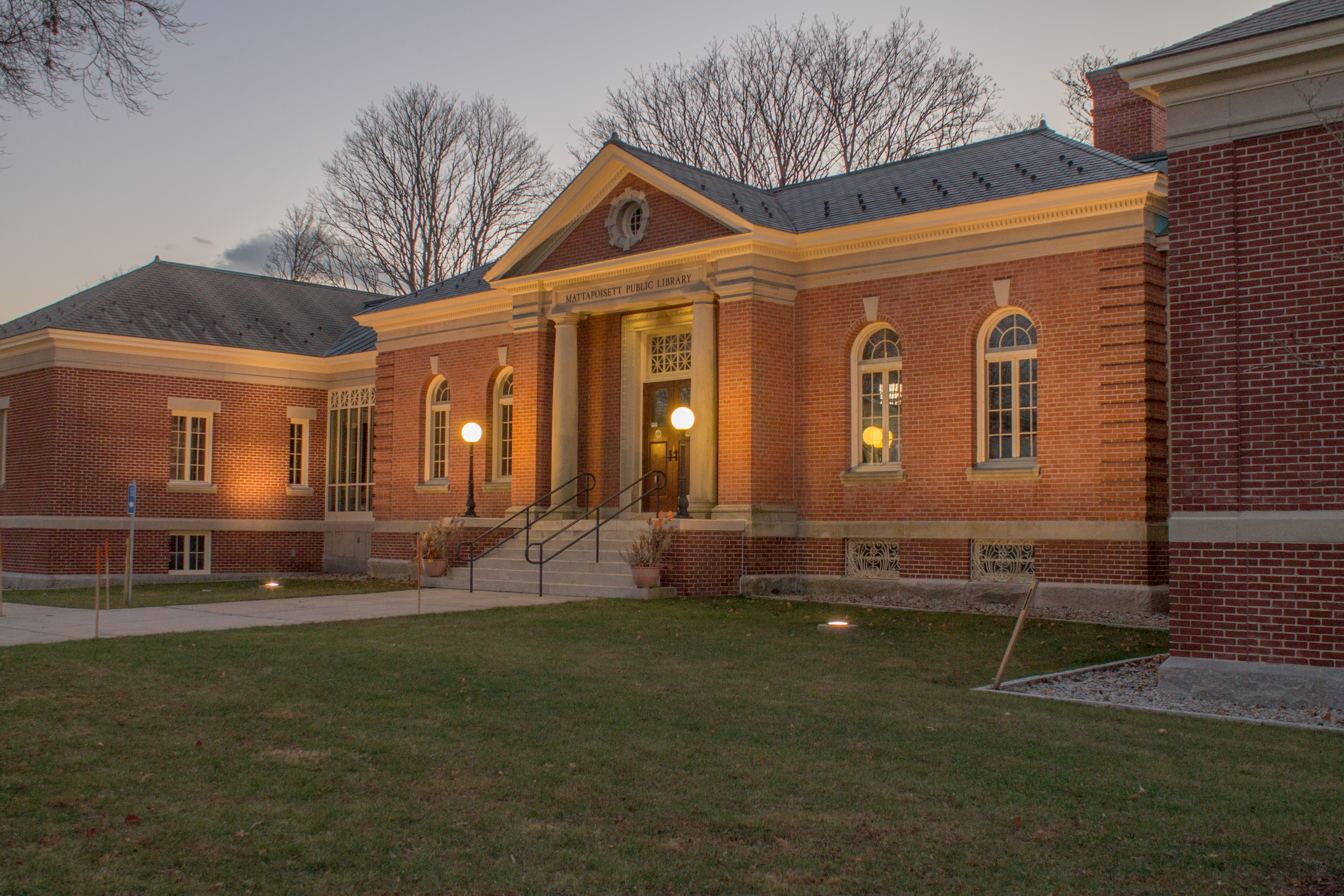
Mattapoisett Free Public Library, Mattapoisett, Massachusetts, 1903.

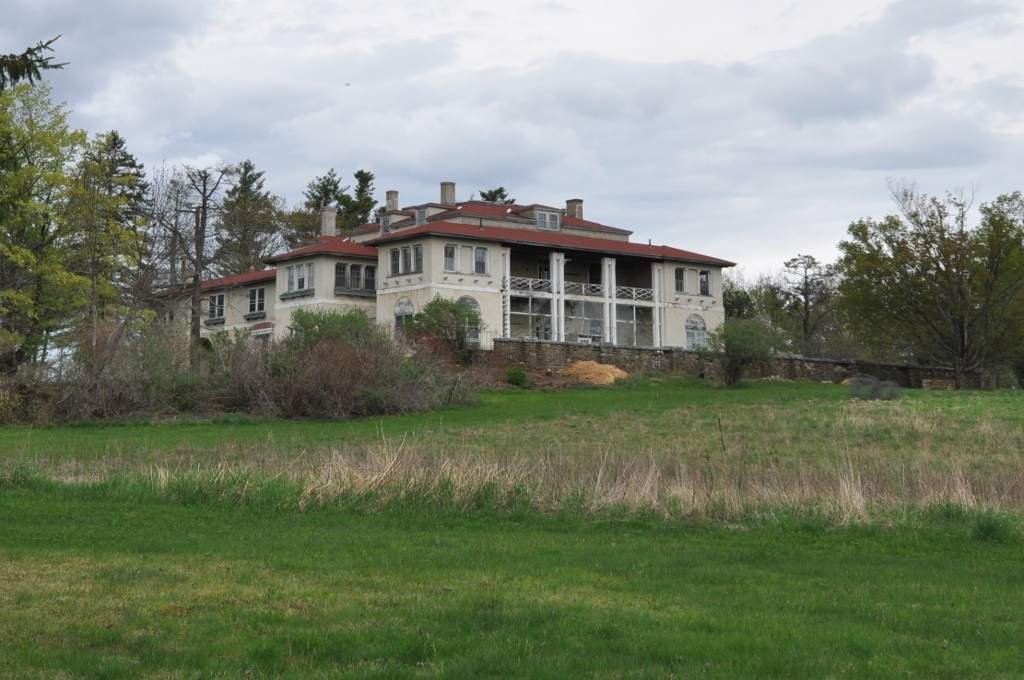
Aldworth Manor, Harrisville, New Hampshire, 1905.

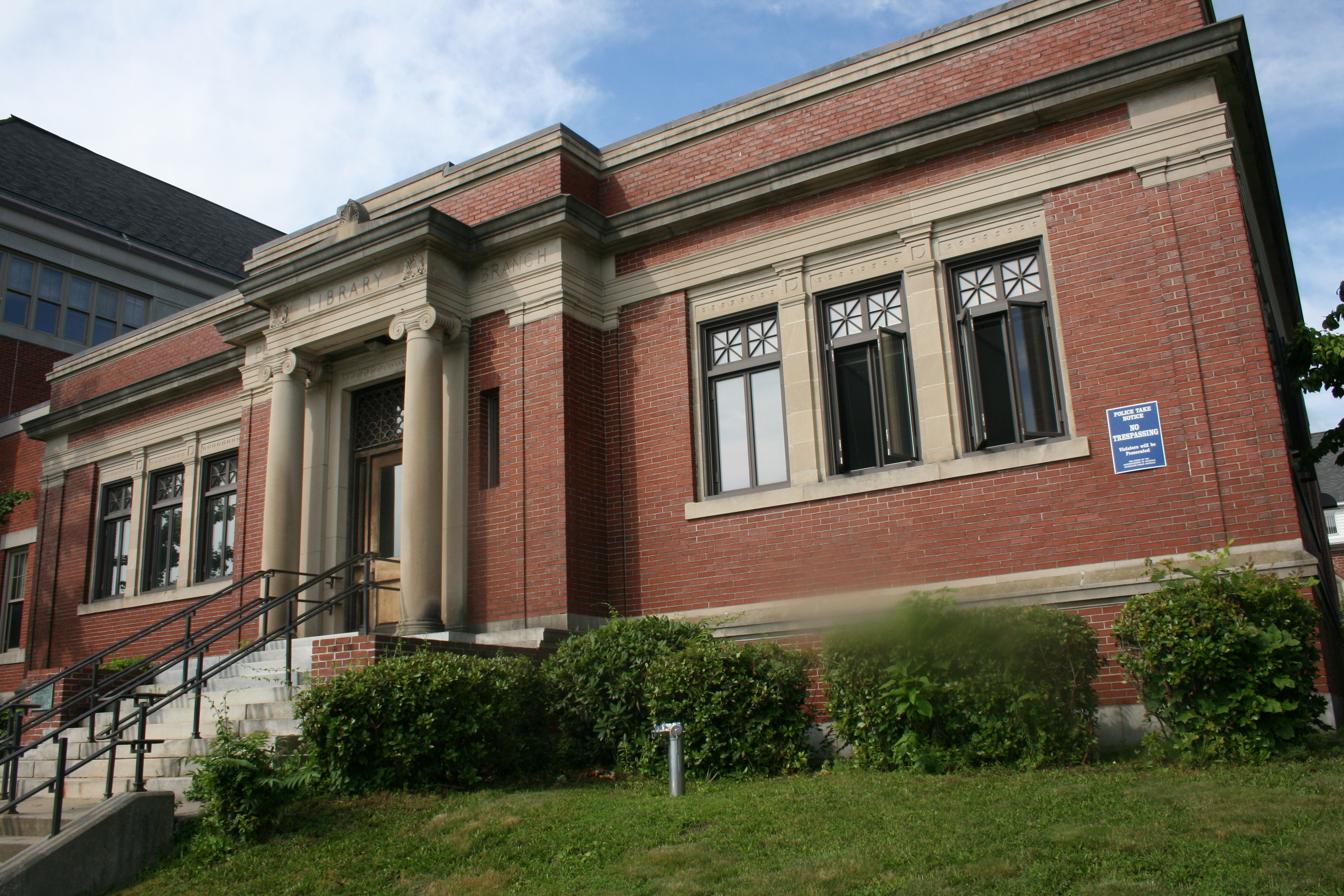
Quinsigamond Branch Library, Worcester, Massachusetts, 1913.

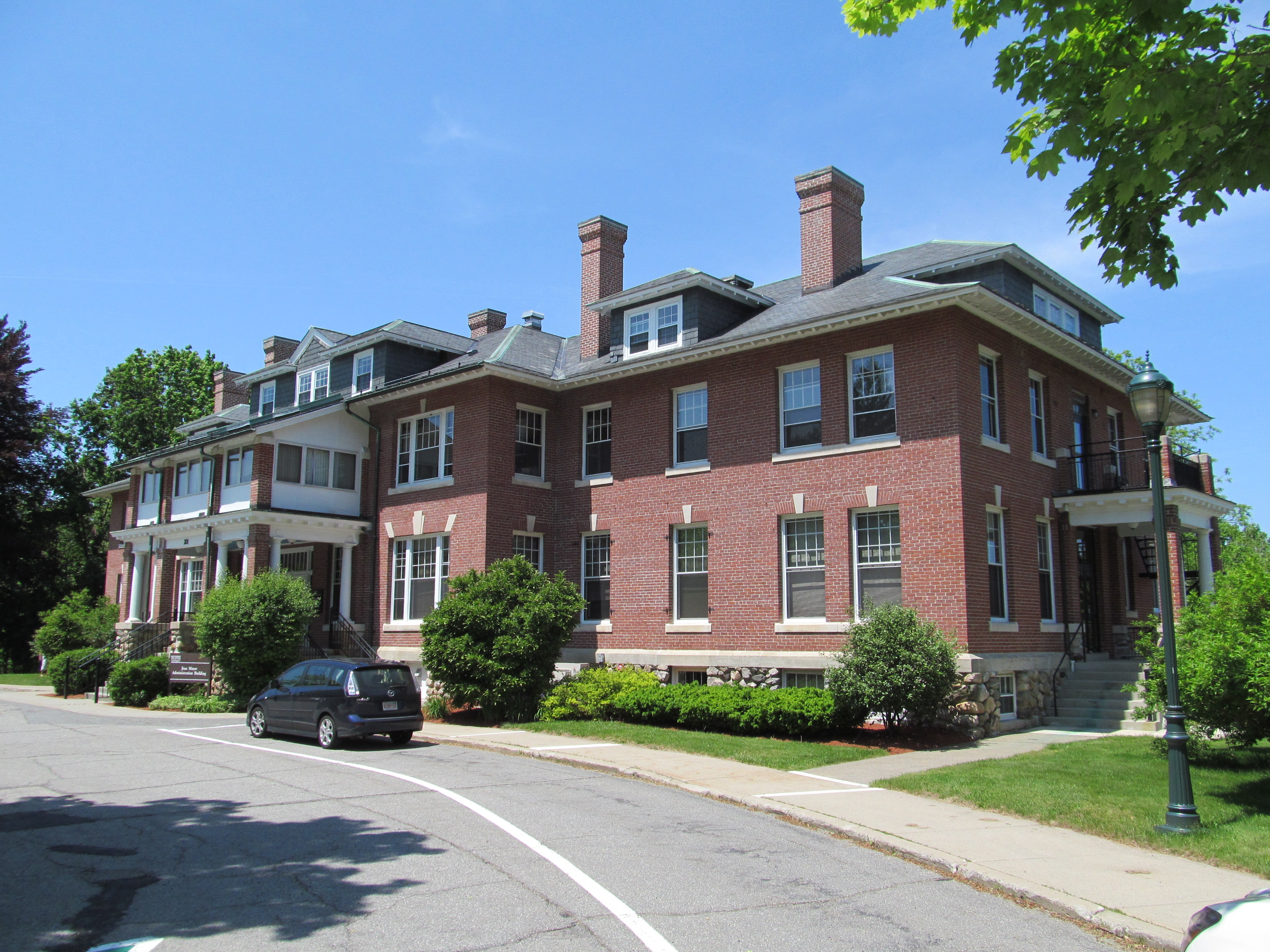
Administration Building, Grafton State Hospital, Grafton, Massachusetts, 1915.

Eastern Avenue Firehouse, Worcester, Massachusetts, 1901.
