= Brightside Apartments =

- U.S. National Register of Historic Places
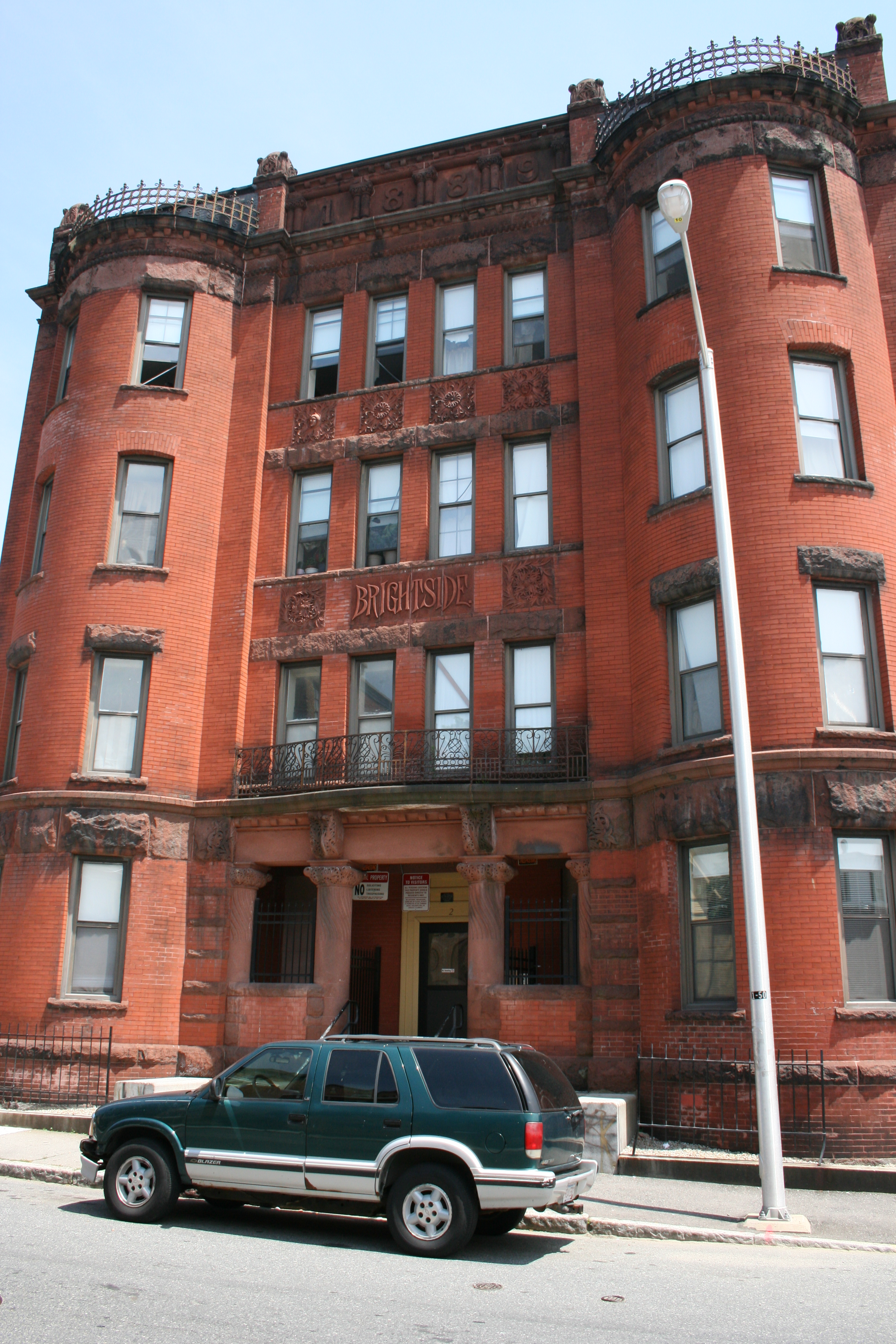

- Location within Massachusetts Location within the United States
- Location: 2 King St., Worcester, Massachusetts
- Coordinates: 42°15′20″N 71°48′50″W
- Built: 1889
- Architect: Fuller & Delano
- Architectural style: Romanesque
- MPS: Worcester MRA
- NRHP reference No.: 80000635
- Added to NRHP: March 05, 1980

The Brightside Apartments is a historic apartment house at 2 King Street in Worcester, Massachusetts. Built in 1888 to a design by Fuller & Delano, it is one of southern Worcester's finest 19th century apartment blocks. The building was listed on the National Register of Historic Places in 1980, even though it had recently experienced some damage due to a minor fire.

== Description and history ==
The Brightside is located on the east side of King Street, a residential street, just north of Main Street (Massachusetts Route 9) on Worcester's south side. It is a four-story structure, built out of red brick with sandstone trim. It features symmetrical round bays flanking a center entrance, which is recessed behind a pair of fluted sandstone columns that are topped by a balcony that still sports original wrought iron railings. Between the upper floors are decorative sandstone panels, and there is a course of rockfaced sandstone between the fourth floor windows and the roof, where the projecting window bays are topped by (again, original) railings. A similar sandstone beltcourse extends across the projecting bays between the first and second floors, and some of the window bays are topped by similarly styled lintels.

The block is one of the more expensive of a series of apartment houses built in the Main South area of Worcester in the 1880s, and the most ornate to survive. The four story brick and sandstone apartment house was built in 1888 at a cost of $40,000, and was probably built to a specific plan by Fuller & Delano, unlike other buildings which were built from standard plans.

== See also ==
- Boynton and Windsor
- Wellington Street Apartment House District
- National Register of Historic Places listings in southwestern Worcester, Massachusetts
- National Register of Historic Places listings in Worcester County, Massachusetts
