= Main Street and Murray Avenue Historic District =

Historic district in Massachusetts, United States

- U.S. National Register of Historic Places
- U.S. Historic district
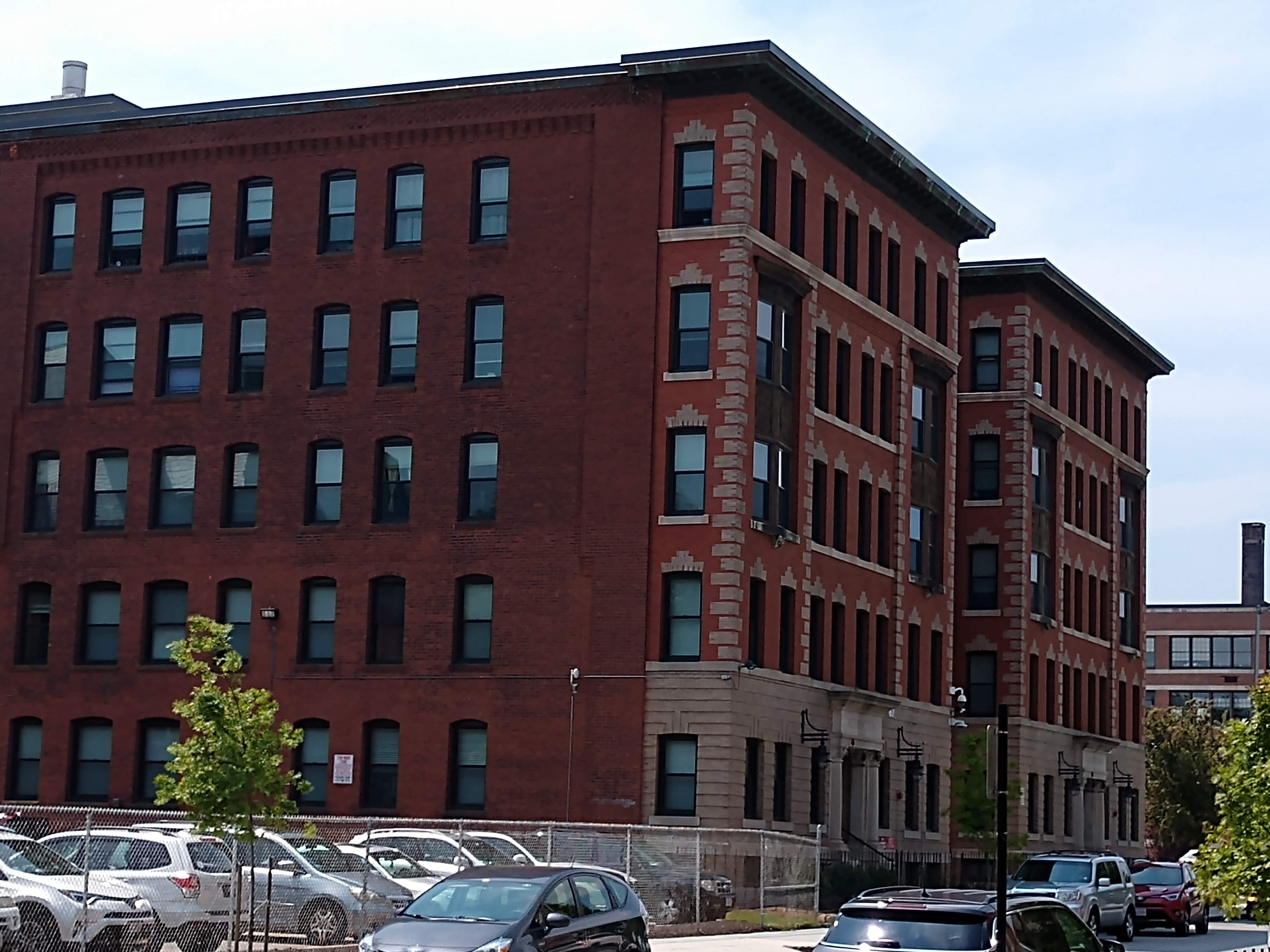
- 87 and 91 Murray Ave.

- Location within Massachusetts Location within the United States
- Location: 718 and 720 Main St., 87 and 91 Murray Ave., Worcester, Massachusetts
- Coordinates: 42°15′30″N 71°48′30″W
- Architectural style: Classical Revival
- NRHP reference No.: 100008421
- Added to NRHP: December 1, 2022

The Main Street and Murray Avenue Historic District of Worcester, Massachusetts encompasses a collection of stylistically similar apartment houses in the city's Piedmont neighborhood. It includes four properties, two each on Main Street and Murray Avenue, which form a cluster of apartment houses of a style that once lined both streets for greater length. The district was listed on the National Register of Historic Places in 2022.

== Description and history ==
Worcester's Piedmont area is southwest of its downtown, with Main Street (Massachusetts Route 9) forming one of its primary arteries. Murray Avenue runs parallel to Main Street, just to its north between Madison and Piedmont Streets. During the late 19th century, this area was heavily developed with residential housing, primarily multistory apartment blocks built of brick and stone. Subsequent redevelopment and urban renewal has resulted in the demolition of many of these buildings. A large cluster of them are found north of Murray Avenue in the Wellington Street Apartment House District. Just southwest of Wellington Street stand a group of four apartment blocks, two each facing Murray Avenue and Main Street. Prior to the development of this area, it formed part of the estate of gunmaker Ethan Allen.

The two blocks facing Massachusetts were previously listed on the National Register as Boynton and Windsor in 1980. They are nearly identical four-story structures, built of red brick with stone trim. They were designed by Barker & Nourse and built c. 1887, featuring Queen Anne styling. Behind them, facing Murray Avenue, are The Kensington and The Buckingham, built in 1898 to a design by the father-son team of Charles Philander Johnson and Guy Benjamin Johnson. They are five stories in height, also built of red brick with stone trim, but are Classical Revival in style. They are one of the few documented works of this short-lived partnership.

== See also ==
- National Register of Historic Places listings in southwestern Worcester, Massachusetts
- National Register of Historic Places listings in Worcester County, Massachusetts
