= G. David Houston =

Gordon David Houston
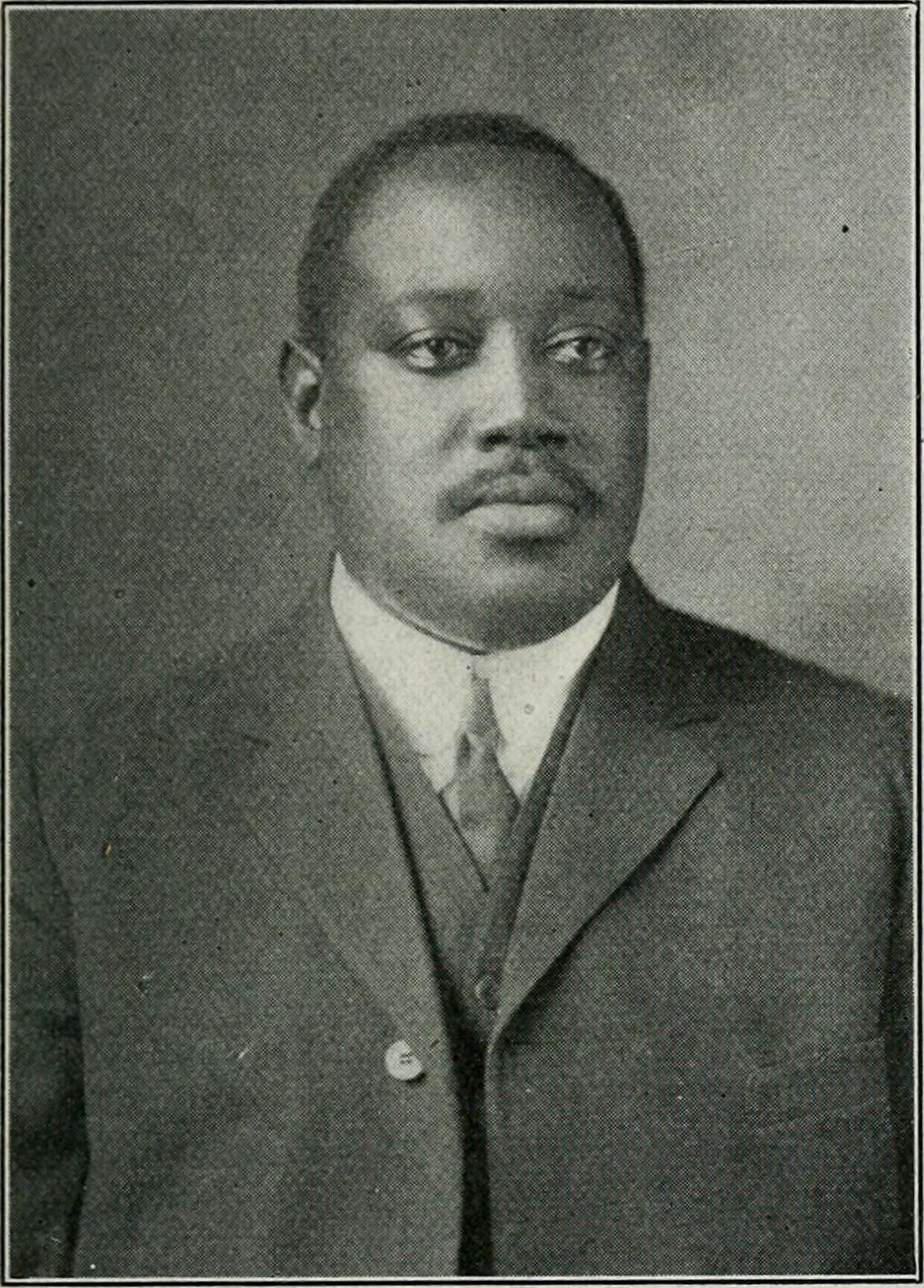
- Born: May 6, 1880; Cambridge, Massachusetts
- Died: June 24, 1940 (aged 60)
- Citizenship: USA
- Occupations: Academic; teacher

Academic background
- Education: Harvard University

Academic work
- Discipline: English Literature
- Sub-discipline: Composition
- Institutions: Tuskegee University; Howard University

Gordon David Houston (6 May 1880 - 24 June 1940) was Professor of English at Howard University, one of the first African-American educators to teach Old English literature and the first African-American from Cambridge to graduate from Harvard University.

== Biography ==
Houston was born on 6 May 1880 in Cambridge, Massachusetts, to parents John Benjamin and Sarah Jane. His brother was Joseph William. He graduated from the English High School in Boston in 1898 and the Latin High School in 1900. He then began to study for his undergraduate degree at Harvard University and graduated from there in 1904. He was the first African-American from Cambridge to graduate from the 'local' university. He graduated in the same class as Franklin D. Roosevelt and their acquaintance continued for many years. Houston's associated with Harvard continued in his later life: he was awarded a Master's degree in 1916; then a Masters of Education in 1930. In 1934 he delivered the eulogy at the funeral of Dr Henry Lewis Bailey, who was one of the first African-American students to graduate from Harvard. In it he praised Bailey's youthfulness, his industry and his love of baseball.

In 1904, Houston's teaching career began when he was employed to teach English at Tuskegee University, where he remained until 1907. He left Tuskegee as "he had grown disenchanted" with the leadership of Booker T. Washington there. According to one account, Washington had manipulated Houston's pastor into passing on letters by Houston, which were critical of him. From 1907 until 1910 he taught at the Frederick Douglass High School in Baltimore. In 1910 he moved to Washington and was employed as an English teacher at M Street High School. By this time Houston had become well-known for his expertise in teaching English composition and in 1912 he was appointed head of the Department and Professor of English at Howard University. During his time at Howard, Houston was involved in campus activism and in protests against J. Stanley Durkee. He argued for changes to pedagogy and instruction, which would enable students to be more engaged with the curriculum. He also taught Old English poetry, and as such is one of the earliest known African-American academics to teach it. He remained at there until his resignation in 1919. Houston left Howard due to what he saw as a "long-standing racist campaign to limit the opportunities of Blacks”.

From Howard University he moved to Dunbar High School in Washington as Head of Business Practice. He then moved the position of Principal at Dunbar Night School. He moved back to Dunbar High School as Assistant Principal, then Principal. At the time of his death, Houston was Principal of the Armstrong Manual Training High School in Washington - a school he had joined in 1926.

Houston died on 24 June 1940.

== Selected publications ==
- Basic English Grammar (Globe Book Company, 1936).
- 'A Negro Senator' in The Journal of Negro History (July 1922).
- 'Reconstruction in the Teaching of English' in The Howard University Record (November 1919).
- 'Weaknesses of the Negro College' in The Crisis (1919).
- 'John Woolman's Efforts in Behalf of Freedom' in The Journal of Negro History (April 1917).

== Personal life ==
Whilst Houston was working at Tuskegee he married Dora Mayo Lawrence on 20 August 1907. They had two daughters: Dorothy and Ethel.

== Historiography ==
Proficient in Old English and Middle English, Houston was one of the earliest black professors who can be identified as teaching Old English poetry. He taught Old English poetry at Howard University and advocated for teaching that would meet the "practical needs of African-American students". Houston's 1919 article 'Reconstruction in the Teaching of English' was praised in The Classical Weekly, which made the point that if you substituted 'Latin' where Houston wrote 'English' his article would still be mostly accurate. It argued for changes to pedagogy to enable students to connect more closely to the texts. His work has been cited by historians such as Derryn Moten, Scott Zaluda and Mary Rambaran-Olm. Moten cited Houston's arguments for a curriculum more tailored to black experience in their work on collective bargaining in higher education. Zaluda considers that Houston's writings on literacy and teaching within the context of "nineteenth century racist criticisms of African American higher education". Rambaran-Olm argues that Houston's advocacy for "close-readings and appreciation" of Old English texts "some twenty years before Tolkien’s seminal piece on reading Beowulf as poetry" was written.
