= Bliss Building =

Historic place in Massachusetts, United States

- U.S. National Register of Historic Places
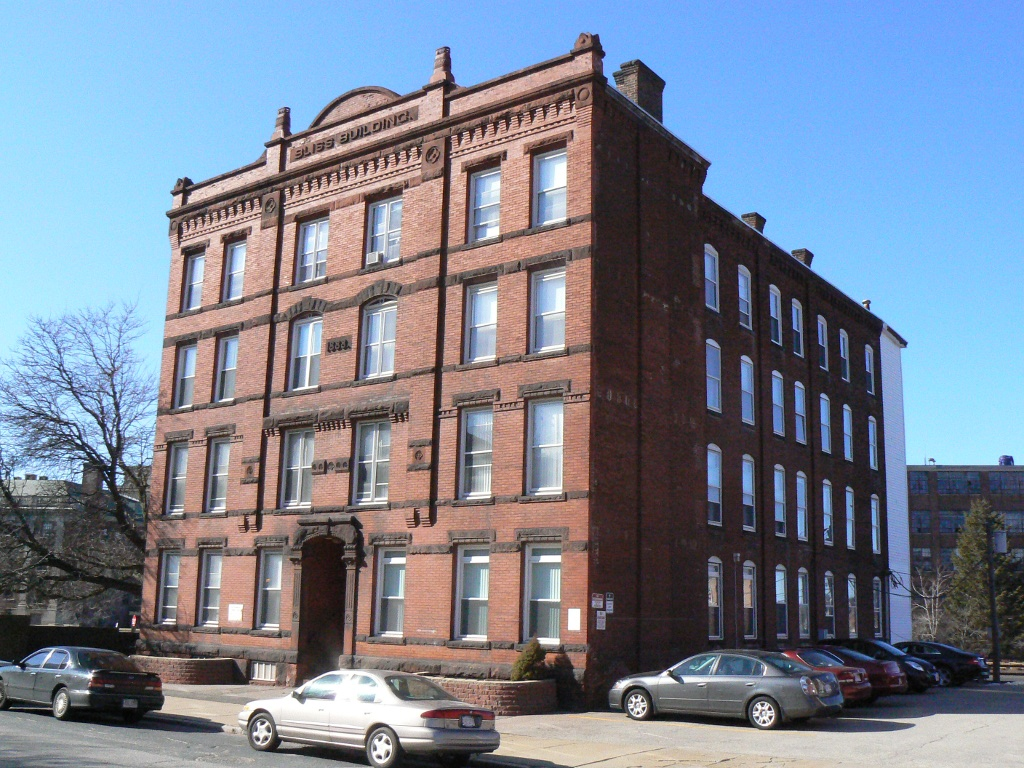

- Location within Massachusetts Location within the United States
- Location: 26 Old Lincoln St., Worcester, Massachusetts
- Coordinates: 42°16′22″N 71°47′54″W
- Built: 1888
- Architect: Barker & Nourse
- MPS: Worcester MRA
- NRHP reference No.: 80000497
- Added to NRHP: March 05, 1980

The William H. Bliss Building is an historic apartment building at 26 Old Lincoln Street in Worcester, Massachusetts. Built in 1888, the four story brick building is one of the few remnants of a once larger development of apartment blocks north of Lincoln Square; most of the other period apartment blocks in the area were demolished by highway development or urban renewal processes. The building was listed on the National Register of Historic Places in 1980.

== Description and history ==
The Bliss Building is set amidst a collection of wide city streets, hemmed in on the west by the major intersection of Lincoln and Salisbury Streets, and a railroad line and Interstate 290 to the east. It faces east toward Old Lincoln Street, once the main alignment of Lincoln Street, which runs northeast from downtown Worcester toward West Boylston. The building is a rectangular four-story masonry structure, fashioned out of red brick with sandstone trim. Its main facade has a stone water table between the basement and ground floors, and three asymmetrically-placed windows on each side of its recessed entrance. The entrance opening is flanked by stone pilasters and topped by a stone segmented arch. The first floor windows have stone sills joined by a stringcourse of stone, and a second stringcourse connects the windows just below the stone lintels. The upper floors have six windows, divided into groups of two by brick pilasters. A corbelled brick stringcourse joins the second-floor windows, and the center pair of windows on the third floor have segmented-arch tops. A band of corbelled brickwork separates the fourth floor from a parapet containing a stone panel identifying the building.

The building was constructed in 1888 to a design by Barker & Nourse, local architects. It was built for William Bliss, a local real estate developer. The Lincoln Square area where it stands was originally lined with similar buildings, but it is now one of the only ones left after urban renewal resulted in the demolition of the others.

== See also ==
- National Register of Historic Places listings in northwestern Worcester, Massachusetts
- National Register of Historic Places listings in Worcester County, Massachusetts
