= Barker & Nourse =

American architectural firm active between 1879 and 1904

Practice information
- Founders: Albert A. Barker; Walter B. Nourse
- Founded: 1879
- Dissolved: 1904
- Location: Worcester, Massachusetts

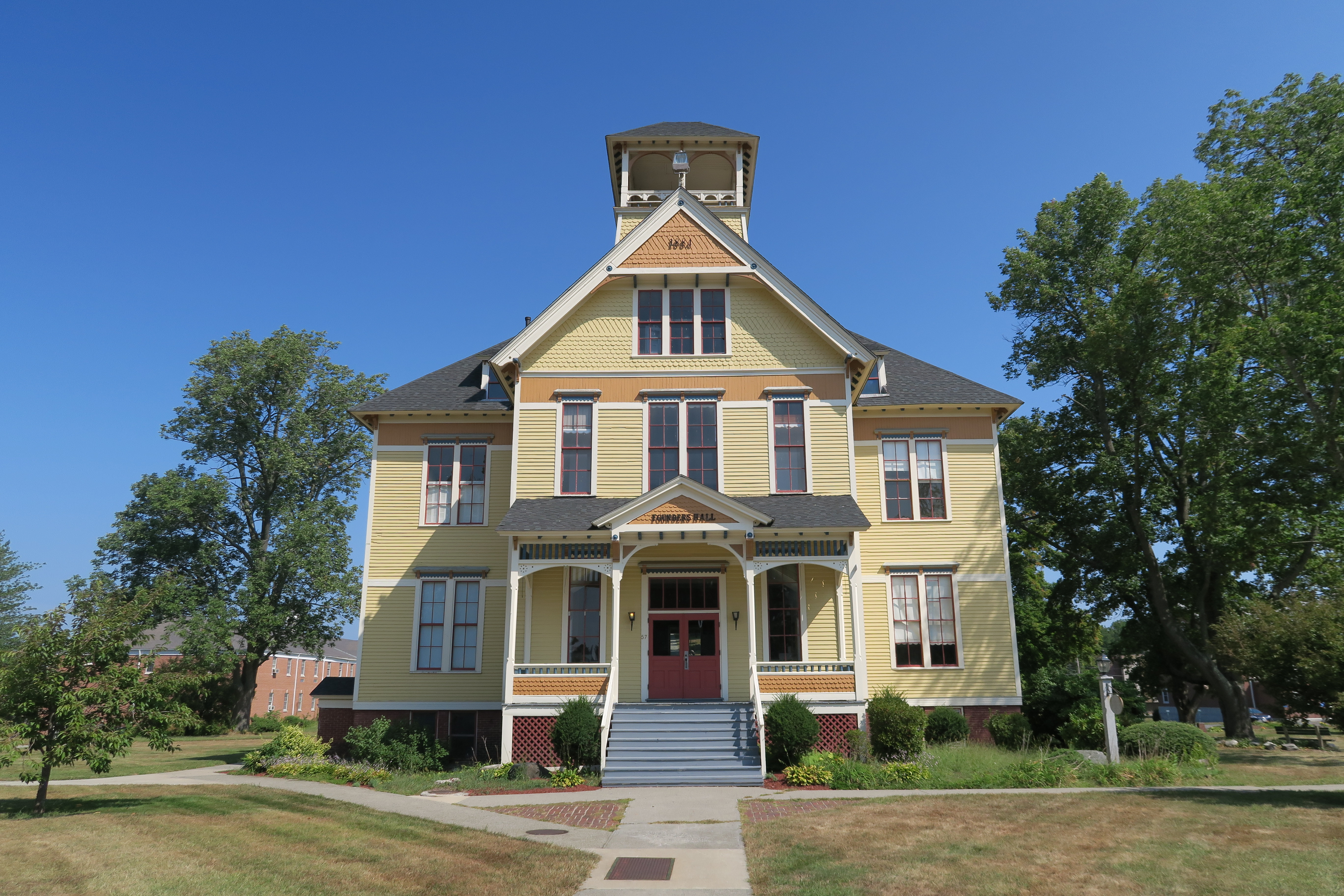
Founder's Hall of the former Atlantic Union College, designed by Barker & Nourse in the Queen Anne style and completed in 1884.

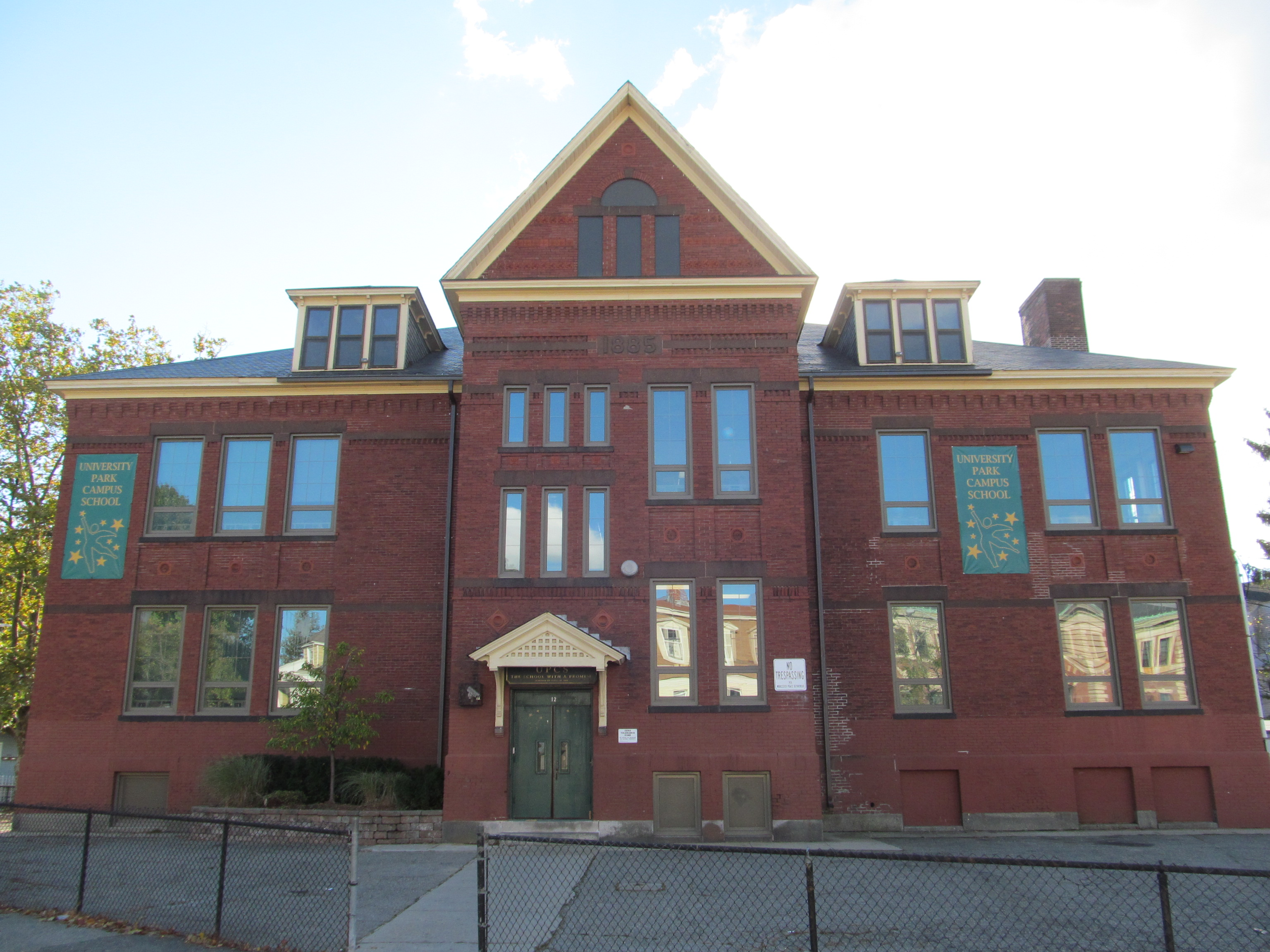
The Freeland Street School in Worcester, designed by Barker & Nourse in the Queen Anne style and completed in 1885.

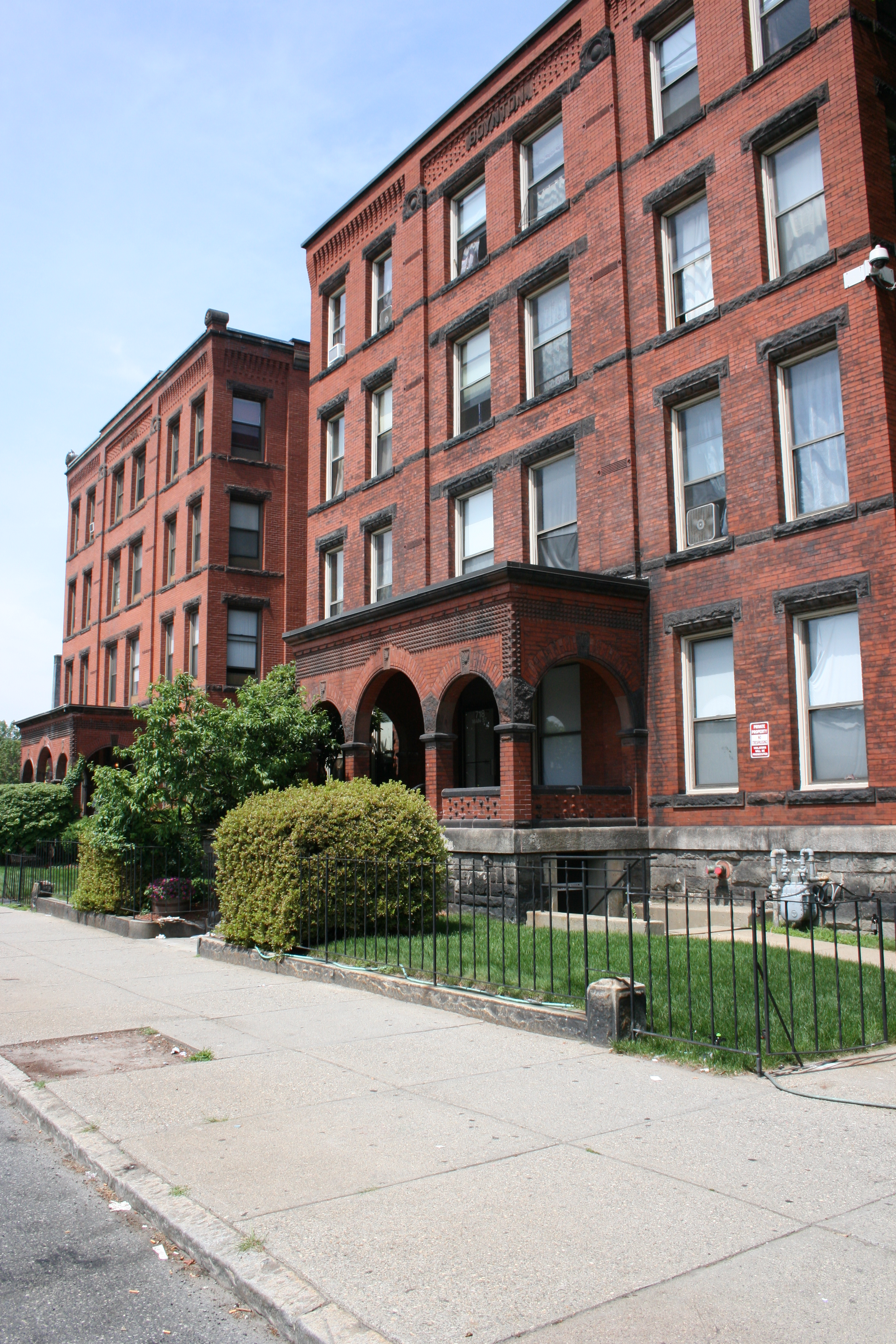
The Boynton and Windsor apartments in Worcester, designed by Barker & Nourse in the Richardsonian Romanesque style and completed in 1887.

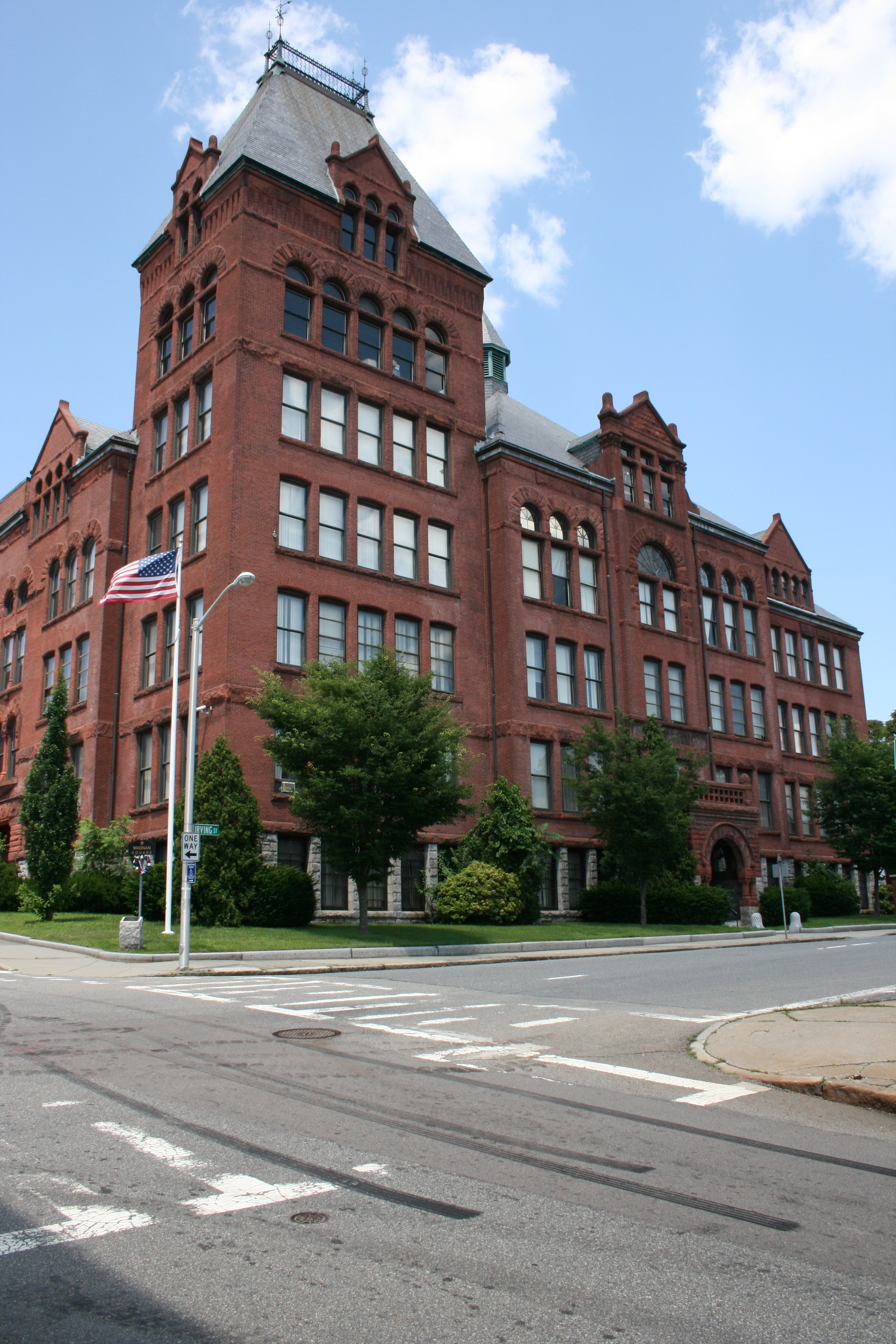
The former English High School in Worcester, designed by Barker & Nourse in the Richardsonian Romanesque style and completed in 1892.

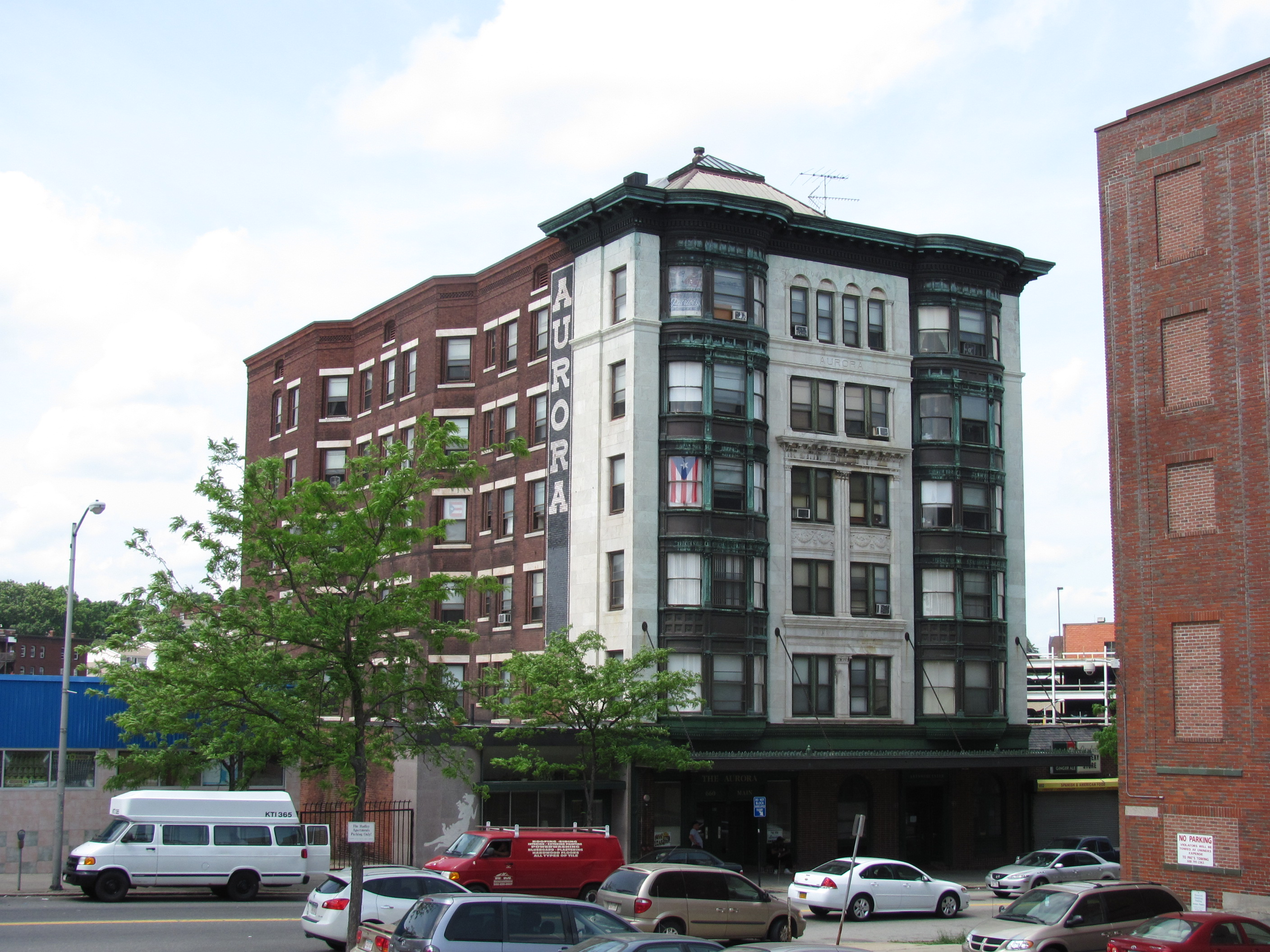
The Aurora Hotel in Worcester, designed by Barker & Nourse in the Neoclassical style and completed in 1898.

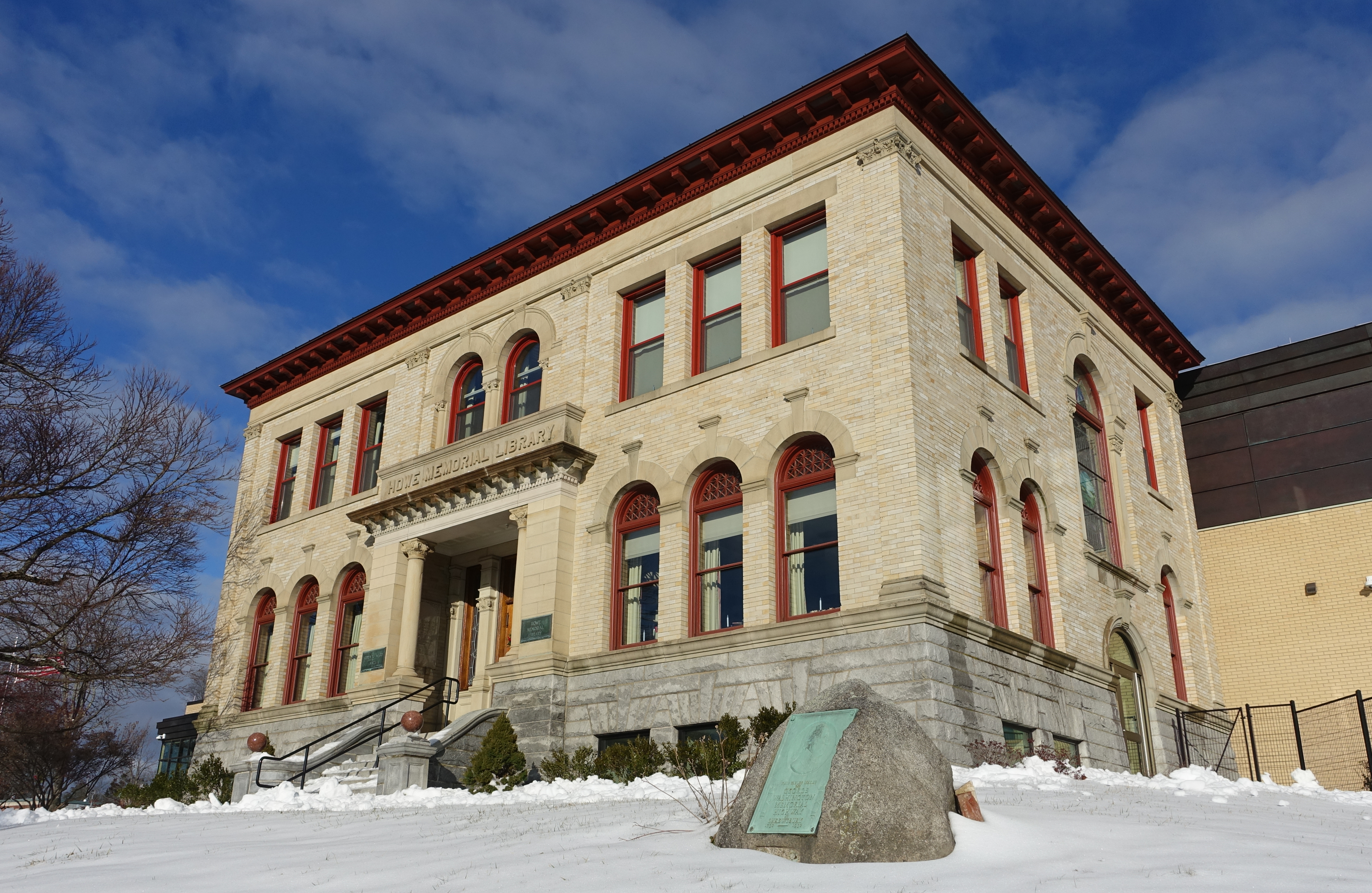
The Shrewsbury Public Library, designed by Barker & Nourse in the Neoclassical style and completed in 1903.

Barker & Nourse was an architectural firm from Worcester, Massachusetts, active from 1879 to 1904.

== History ==
Barker & Nourse was formed March 1, 1879, as the partnership of architects Albert A. Barker (1852–1905) and Walter B. Nourse (1853–1906). They were the successors to the practice of architect John E. Holman, former partner of Amos P. Cutting, Nourse's employer. In its day, the firm was primarily known for its residential and educational designs. They dissolved their partnership effective January 1, 1904, with Barker succeeding to the practice. Both architects practiced independently until their deaths in 1905 and 1906, respectively.

== Partner biographies ==
=== Albert A. Barker ===
Albert Augustus Barker (November 20, 1852 – June 9, 1905) was born in Guadalajara to John Bixby Barker, a paper manufacturer, and Harriet Elizabeth Barker, née Newton. After the elder Barker's death in 1860 the family relocated first to Mrs. Barker's family home in Bennington, New Hampshire, and second to Worcester, where Barker completed his education. After leaving school he joined the office of architect Elbridge Boyden, for whom he worked until forming Barker & Nourse.

Barker was married in 1877 to Eacyetta Boyd. They had two children, both sons. Barker died June 9, 1905, in Worcester at the age of 52.

=== Walter B. Nourse ===
Walter Bailey Nourse (November 5, 1853 – March 4, 1906) was born in Westborough, Massachusetts, to Benjamin Bailey Nourse, a contractor and builder, and Mary Elizabeth Nourse, née Longley. He was a direct descendant of Rebecca Nurse, who was executed for witchcraft in Salem in 1692. He was educated in the Westborough public schools before joining the office of architect Amos P. Cutting as an apprentice. He worked for Cutting until forming Barker & Nourse.

Nourse was married to Emma L. McClellan. They had three children, two sons and one daughter. He died March 4, 1906, in Worcester at the age of 52.

== Legacy ==
A number of its works are listed on the United States National Register of Historic Places, and others contribute to listed historic districts.

== Works ==
=== Barker & Nourse, 1879–1904 ===
- 1880 – George A. Bigelow house, 3 Loudon St, Worcester, Massachusetts
- 1881 – Alpha M. Cheney House, (Note: NRHP-listed.) 61 Chestnut St, Southborough, Massachusetts
- 1881 – Wade H. Hill house, (Note: A contributing resource to the Woodland Street Historic District, NRHP-listed in 1980.) 114 Woodland St, Worcester, Massachusetts
- 1882 – Iver Johnson house, 27 Catharine St, Worcester, Massachusetts
- 1884 – Founder's Hall, Atlantic Union College, South Lancaster, Massachusetts
- 1885 – Alexander Bigelow house, 904 Main St, Worcester, Massachusetts
- 1885 – Freeland Street School, 12 Freeland St, Worcester, Massachusetts
- 1885 – Rebecca Nurse monument, (Note: A contributing resource to the Salem Village Historic District, NRHP-listed in 1975.) Rebecca Nurse Homestead, 149 Pine St, Danvers, Massachusetts
- 1886 – Edwin H. Wood house, 4 King St, Worcester, Massachusetts
- 1887 – Boynton and Windsor apartments, 718 and 720 Main St, Worcester, Massachusetts
- 1887 – Ellery B. Crane house, 25 Richards St, Worcester, Massachusetts
- 1888 – Bliss Building, 26 Old Lincoln St, Worcester, Massachusetts
- 1888 – Harrison S. Prentice apartments, (Note: A contributing resource to the Oxford–Crown Historic District, NRHP-listed in 1976.) 191 Pleasant St, Worcester, Massachusetts
- 1889 – Osgood Bradley house, 21 Richards St, Worcester, Massachusetts
- 1890 – Quinsigamond School, 14 Blackstone River Rd, Worcester, Massachusetts
- 1891 – Worcester Society of Antiquity (former), (Note: A contributing resource to the Institutional District, NRHP-listed in 1980.) 39 Salisbury St, Worcester, Massachusetts
- 1892 – Ann Colton house, (Note: A contributing resource to the Lincoln Estate–Elm Park Historic District, NRHP-listed in 1980.) 41 Cedar St, Worcester, Massachusetts
- 1892 – English High School (former), 20 Irving St, Worcester, Massachusetts
- 1892 – Frye Building, (Note: A contributing resource to the Marlborough Center Historic District, NRHP-listed in 1998.) 342 Lincoln St, Marlborough, Massachusetts
- 1892 – Odd Fellows' Home, (Note: Demolished, formerly NRHP-listed.) 40 Randolph Rd, Worcester, Massachusetts
- 1893 – Thomas B. Hamilton house, (Note: A contributing resource to the Hammond Heights historic district, NRHP-listed in 1980.) 29 Germain St, Worcester, Massachusetts
- 1893 – Samuel E. Hildreth house, (Note: Demolished.) 856 Main St, Worcester, Massachusetts
- 1893 – Bertrand W. Stone house, 1 Germain St, Worcester, Massachusetts
- 1894 – Hopkinton High School (former), 85 Main St, Hopkinton, Massachusetts
- 1894 – Henry K. McClenning house, 14 Germain St, Worcester, Massachusetts
- 1894 – The Russell, 49 Austin St, Worcester, Massachusetts
- 1895 – George H. Heywood house, 80 Glazier St, Gardner, Massachusetts
- 1895 – Troy School, (Note: A contributing resource to the Troy Village Historic District, NRHP-listed in 2002.) 44 School St, Troy, New Hampshire
- 1897 – Benjamin A. Barber house, 31 Germain St, Worcester, Massachusetts
- 1897 – Kingsley Laboratories, (Note: A contributing resource to the Worcester Academy historic district, NRHP-listed in 1980.) Worcester Academy, Worcester, Massachusetts
- 1898 – Aurora Hotel, 660 Main St, Worcester, Massachusetts
- 1898 – Day Building, (Note: A contributing resource to the Mechanics' Hall District, NRHP-listed in 1980.) 300 Main St, Worcester, Massachusetts
- 1898 – William Trowbridge Forbes House, 23 Trowbridge Rd, Worcester, Massachusetts
- 1898 – Gardner High School (former), (Note: A contributing resource to the Gardner Uptown Historic District, NRHP-listed in 1999.) 130 Elm St, Gardner, Massachusetts
- 1898 – Johnsonia Hotel, 510 Main St, Fitchburg, Massachusetts
- 1898 – The Vendome, (Note: A contributing resource to The Vendome and the St. Ives historic district, NRHP-listed in 1990.) 17 Chandler St, Worcester, Massachusetts
- 1899 – Post Office Building, 144 Central St, Gardner, Massachusetts
- 1900 – Hotel Vernon, 1 Millbury St, Worcester, Massachusetts
- 1901 – Denny Block, 139 Highland St, Worcester, Massachusetts
- 1903 – School Street School, 53 School St, Gardner, Massachusetts
- 1903 – Shrewsbury Public Library, 214 Main St, Shrewsbury, Massachusetts

=== Albert A. Barker, 1904–1905 ===
- 1906 – Princeton Center School, (Note: A contributing resource to the Princeton Center Historic District, NRHP-listed in 1999.) 18 Boylston Ave, Princeton, Massachusetts

=== Walter B. Nourse, 1904–1906 ===
- 1905 – Racicot Block, (Note: A contributing resource to the Main Street Historic District, NRHP-listed in 1982.) 211-219 Main St, Webster, Massachusetts

== Architectural drawings ==
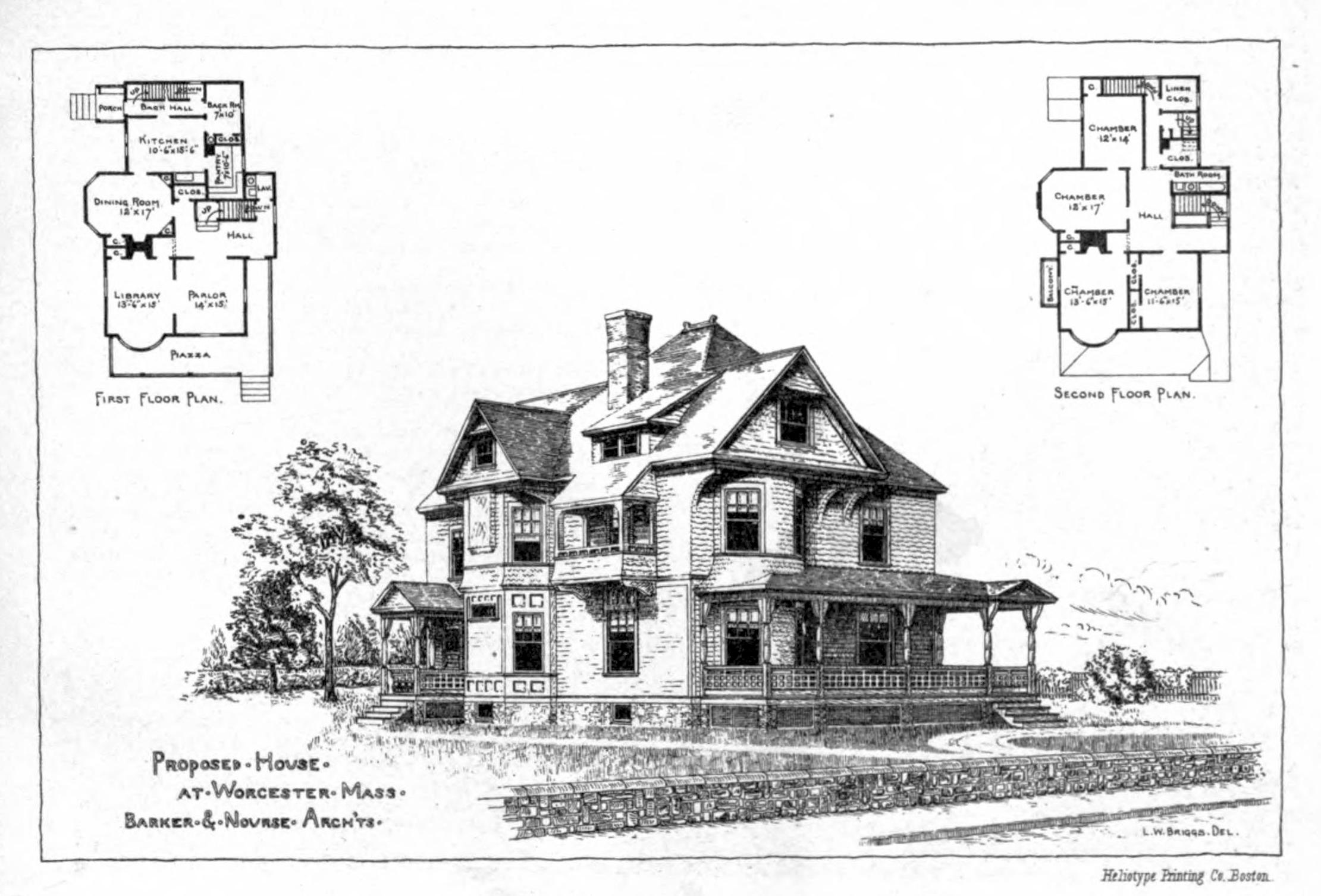
Proposed house, Worcester, Massachusetts, published 1888. Lucius W. Briggs, delineator.

== See also ==
- Illustrations of a Few Buildings Erected from Designs by Barker & Nourse, Architects (Worcester, 1898)
