= William Trowbridge Forbes House =

Historic house in Massachusetts, United States

- U.S. National Register of Historic Places
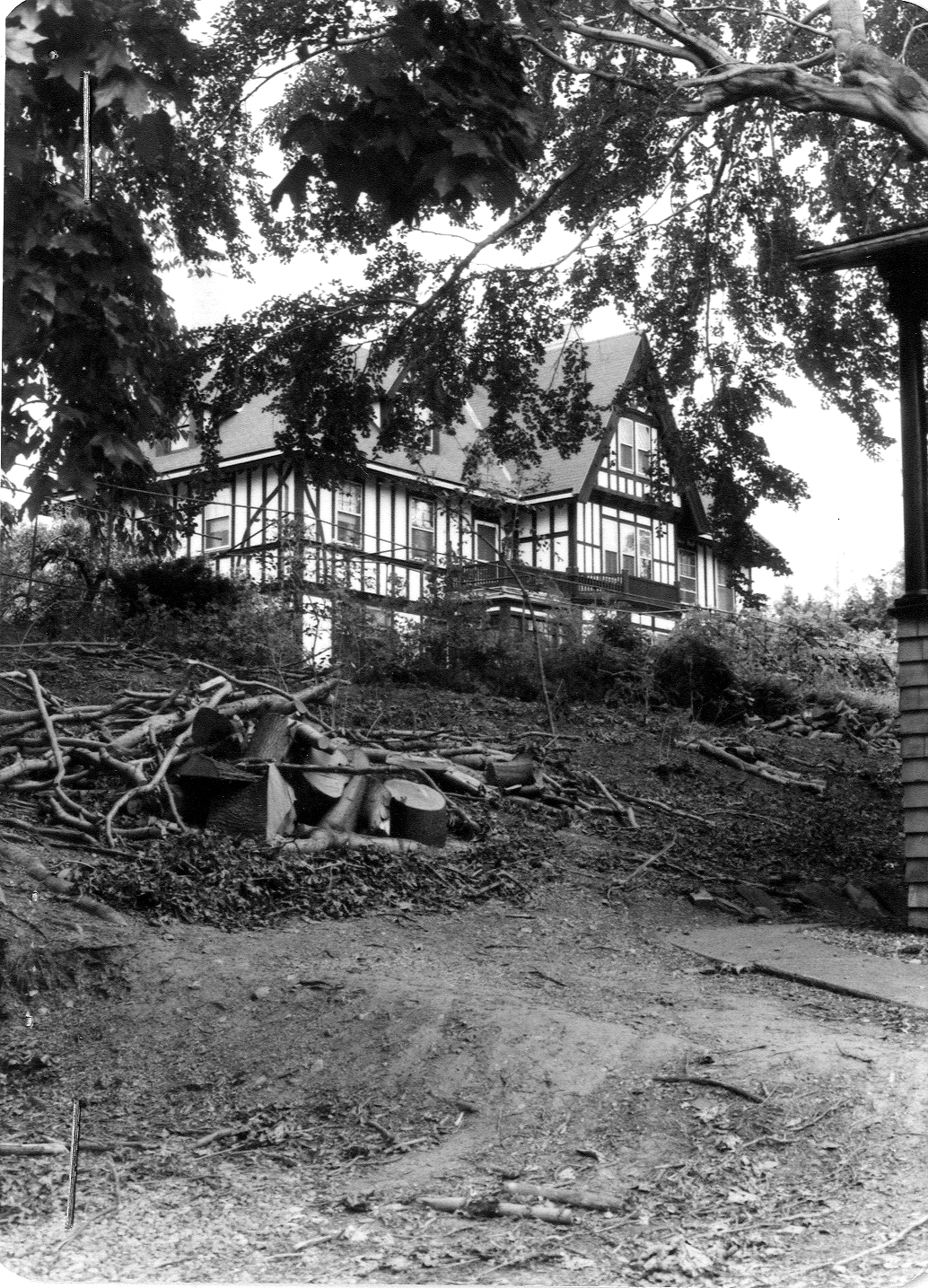
- c. 1978 photo

- Location within Massachusetts Location within the United States
- Location: 23 Trowbridge Rd., Worcester, Massachusetts
- Coordinates: 42°16′20″N 71°48′40″W
- Area: 1.4 acres (0.57 ha)
- Built: 1898
- Architect: Barker & Nourse
- Architectural style: Tudor Revival
- MPS: Worcester MRA
- NRHP reference No.: 80000636
- Added to NRHP: March 05, 1980

The William Trowbridge Forbes House was a historic house at 23 Trowbridge Road in Worcester, Massachusetts. Built in 1898 to a design by Barker & Nourse, it was one of the city's finest examples of Tudor Revival architecture, and was home to Esther Forbes, author of Johnny Tremain. The house was listed on the National Register of Historic Places in 1980. The house was demolished in November 2003.

== Description and history ==
The William Trowbridge Forbes House was located in a residential setting northwest of downtown Worcester, and just south of the campus of Worcester Polytechnic Institute on the west side of Trowbridge Street. It was a large 2 1/2-story wood-frame structure, with steeply pitched gables, diamond pane windows, and extensive half-timbered stucco exterior. A stone terrace extended along its southern facade.

The house was built in 1898 to a design by Barker & Nourse, and it was a prominent local example of the Tudor Revival. It was supposedly built on the site of an early example of residential construction in concrete, designed by Elbridge Boyden; that house was demolished because it could not accommodate modern amenities such as indoor plumbing and electricity. William Forbes, the owner, was a local lawyer and politician who served in the state legislature and as a probate judge. His wife Harriette Merrifield Forbes is locally notable for her interest in, and photography of, local architectural history, and for organization of a local suffragette society that met at the house. Her daughter was Esther Forbes, the writer of children's books best known for Johnny Tremain.

== See also ==
- National Register of Historic Places listings in northwestern Worcester, Massachusetts
- National Register of Historic Places listings in Worcester County, Massachusetts
