= William Howland (musician) =

American opera singer, voice teacher, composer and conductor (1871–1945)

William A. Howland (1 May 1871 – 3 May 1945) was an American operatic bass, voice teacher, composer, conductor and university administrator. He was the head of the music department at the University of Michigan from 1900-1914. In 1914 he co-founded the Detroit Institute of Musical Arts; serving as the school's vice-president and head of the vocal department until his death 31 years later.

== Early life and education ==
Born in Worcester, Massachusetts, Howland was the youngest of six children born to Emma Lane Howland and her husband Dr. Asa Allan. His mother was a direct descendant of John Howland, a pilgrim who travelled from England to North America on the Mayflower, signed the Mayflower Compact, and helped found Plymouth Colony. His father was a prominent dental surgeon and was notably the first president of the Dental Association of New England. William served as president of the Pilgrim John Howland Society from 1924 to 1945.

After attending grammar school and graduating from English High School in Worcester in 1889, Howland moved to New York City, where he pursued music studies, sang in various churches, and also taught singing through 1894. In New York he studied singing with Frederick Bristol, music theory and composition with Dudley Buck, conducting with Frank Damrosch, piano with Albert Ross Parsons, and the organ with Richard T. Percy. He also pursued further studies abroad during the summer months of the early 1890s; studying the oratorio repertoire in London with Alberto Randegger and Frederick Walker, and music composition, musical analysis, and opera with Alfred Lorenz in Germany.

== Career ==
Howland made both his professional concert and opera debuts in New York City in 1889. In 1892–1893 he was a member of Boston's Ideal Opera Company, also known as the "Bostonians". In 1894 he returned to Worcester to assume the post of music director of Piedmont Church; a position he held for five years. During that time, he was also active as an oratorio soloist in concerts in New York and Boston. In 1895 he was a soloist at the Worcester Music Festival. On June 24, 1896, he married Fredreka Shaw Barnard (1870–1964), with whom he had two children: John and Dorothy.

In 1900 he moved to Ann Arbor, Michigan, to assume the post of director of the music department at the University of Michigan. He remained in that role until the conclusion of the 1913–1914 school year. He notably served as the conductor of the University of Michigan Men's Glee Club from 1911 to 1914. In 1914 he co-founded the Detroit Institute of Musical Arts which is now a part of Marygrove College. He served as the school's vice-president and head of the vocal department until his death in 1945.
