= Detroit Institute of Musical Arts =

Defunct music conservatory in Detroit, Michigan, U.S.

Coordinates: 42°21′39″N 83°03′59″W

The Detroit Institute of Musical Arts (DIMA) was a music conservatory in Detroit, Michigan that was actively providing higher education in music from 1914 to 1970.

== History ==
The Detroit Institute of Musical Arts was founded by several Michigan based musicians and teachers. It opened its doors in the autumn of 1914.

The school granted its own degrees up until 1945 when it began awarding diplomas through the University of Detroit (UD). The school resumed granting its own degrees in the late 1950s when its association with the UD ended. In 1957 the school relocated to new facilities at 200 E. Kirby at the corner of John R and Kirby.

In 1970 the school merged with the Detroit Music Settlement School to form the Detroit Community Music School. That school in turn became a part of the College for Creative Studies (CCS) in 1984, but was later passed off by the CCS to Marygrove College in 2000 to become the Institute of Music and Dance.

Graduating class 1934: Winifred Pickles, Homer LaGassey, Dorothy Schroeder, Marjorie Smith, Mildred Cramer, Millie Connelly, Dorothy Blackwell, Dorothy Helwig, Ethel Orr, Loretta Petrosky, Walter Ludwig, Mildred Milantz, Eunice Young, Pauline Crowe

== Notable alumni ==
- Ken Kersey
- Alyne Dumas Lee
- Freda Payne
- Dorothy Geneva Styles
- Larry Teal
- Yusef Lateef (did not graduate)

== Notable faculty ==
- William Howland
