= Freeland Street School =

- U.S. National Register of Historic Places
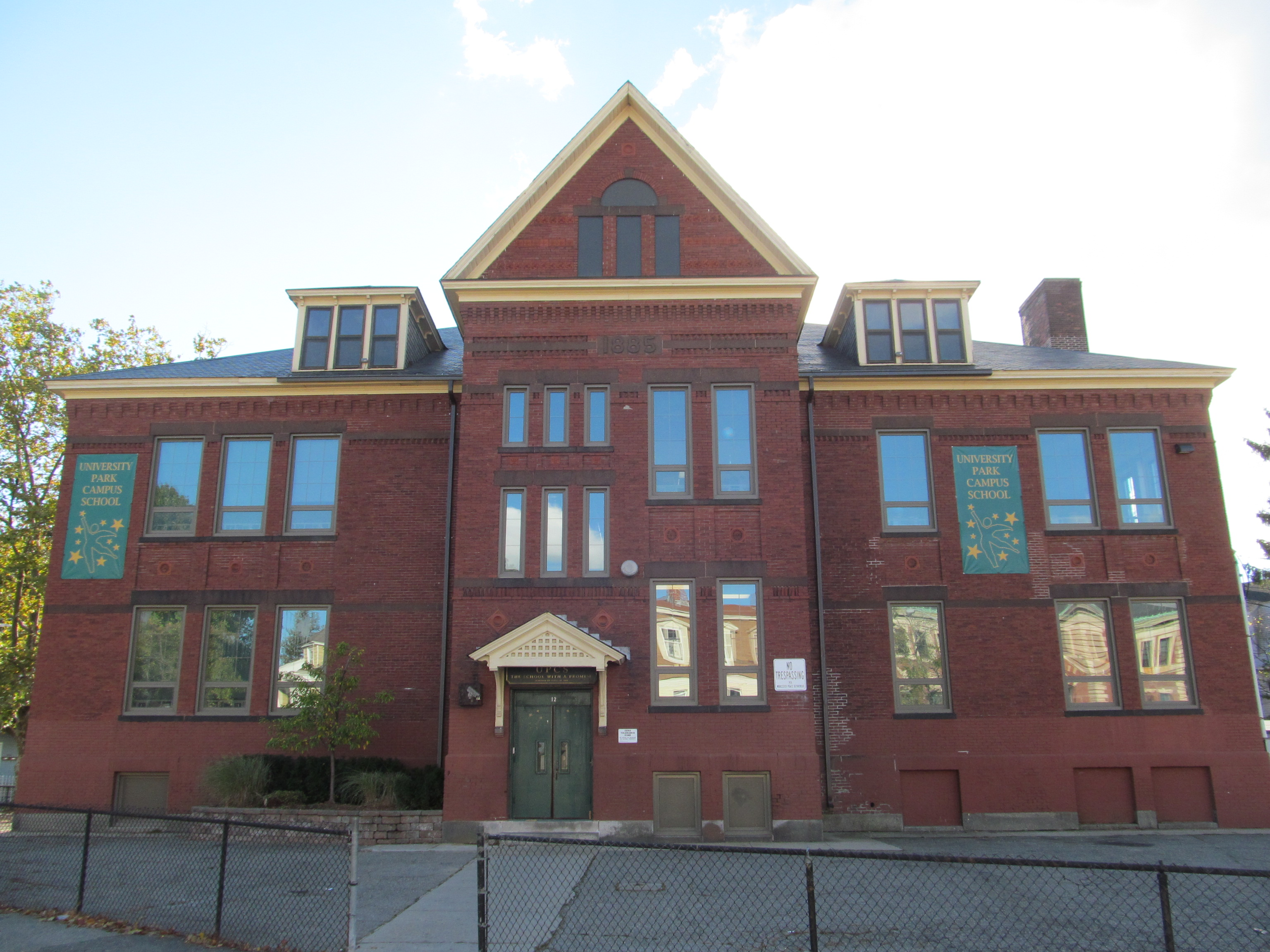
- Freeland Street School

- Location within Massachusetts Location within the United States
- Location: 12 Freeland St., Worcester, Massachusetts
- Coordinates: 42°14′49″N 71°49′31″W
- Built: 1885
- Architect: Barker & Nourse
- Architectural style: Late Victorian
- MPS: Worcester MRA
- NRHP reference No.: 80000482
- Added to NRHP: March 05, 1980

The Freeland Street School, now the University Park Campus School, is a historic school at 12 Freeland Street in Worcester, Massachusetts. It is a 2 1/2-story brick building built in 1885 during a period of significant growth in the city. The front and back of the building have slightly projecting gabled sections that house the buildings entries and stairwells. The exterior of the building is trimmed in sandstone, with some decorative terracotta panels. The roof his hipped, and the projecting sections are flanked by small hip-roofed dormers.

The building was listed on the National Register of Historic Places in 1980. The school is now known as the University Park Campus School, and is still administered by the Worcester school district.
