= Larry Teal =

Larry Teal (26 March 1905 - 11 July 1984) is considered by many to be the father of American orchestral saxophone.

== Career ==
Laurence Lyon Teal earned a bachelor's degree in pre-dentistry from the University of Michigan. Although he came to the University of Michigan to study dentistry, he soon became involved with Wilson's Wolverines—a jazz band with a more than local following. He toured Europe with them for several years and later returned to the States only to be recruited by Glen Gray's Casa Loma Orchestra of Detroit, one of the important society orchestras of the period. He later earned a Doctor of Music from the Detroit Institute of Musical Arts in 1943.

Teal was a member of radio station WJR's live studio orchestra and performed with the Detroit Symphony Orchestra (DSO) from 1943 to 1964. In addition to the saxophone, he played clarinet and served as the orchestra's principal flutist. He also established a music studio near Wayne University, where he taught high school and collegiate students including Don Sinta. Teal performed with both classical and popular music ensembles.

He became the first full-time professor of saxophone at any American university when he was appointed to the faculty of the University of Michigan-Ann Arbor in 1953. He remained the professor of saxophone there until he retired in 1974, at which time he was given the title "professor emeritus."

During his 21 years at the university, Teal taught over 100 college saxophone students, many of whom went on to become successful teachers and performers. In this way he had an unusual degree of influence over the direction and quality of classical saxophone teaching in America.

== Notable students ==
His students included:

- Donald Sinta, who succeeded him as professor of saxophone at the University of Michigan
- Steven Mauk, retired professor of saxophone at Ithaca College
- Paul Brodie

Asked about his 1950s undergraduate training with Teal, Brodie replied. "The most important thing I learned from Larry was a sense of self-discipline. The first 500 times a student plays an exercise is the introduction; the second 500 times is the repetition. To a student who likes to flip from one thing to the next without perfecting anything this is a shock. A musician must learn to take a piece of music apart. This takes great patience and much time. Larry was a terrific technical teacher who demanded perfection. He had a plan for each student, a well-organized progression from one skill to another. He was a real pedagogue and certainly my experience with him was one of the greatest experiences I had in my entire education. I certainly think the most important teacher I had was Larry Teal because he taught me how to play, how to read, how to count, and how to develop myself as a musician."

- Patrick Meighan, retired professor of saxophone at Florida State University
- John Sampen, now professor of saxophone at Bowling Green State University
- Joe Henderson
- Josh Rodriguez
- John Nichol, professor of saxophone at Central Michigan University
- Jerry D. Luedders, professor of music and saxophone at California State University, Northridge
- Fred W. Becker, Musician and Teacher
- Randall E. Reese, Associate Professor of Music at Armstrong Atlantic State University
- Max Plank, retired professor of saxophone at Eastern Michigan University
- David Henderson, professor of saxophone at University of the Pacific
- Kenny Millions
- Larry Teal Jr.
- Yusef Lateef
- Bennie Maupin, adjunct faculty at CalArts (California Institute of the Arts)
- Lynn Klock, retired professor of saxophone at University of Massachusetts Amherst

== Books ==
Teal wrote several books for use by saxophone students and teachers, including:

- The Art of Saxophone Playing (1963) ISBN 0-87487-057-7
- Melodies for the Young Saxophonist
- The Saxophonist's Workbook
- Daily Studies for the Improvement of the Saxophone Technique
