= The Vendome and the St. Ives =

- U.S. National Register of Historic Places
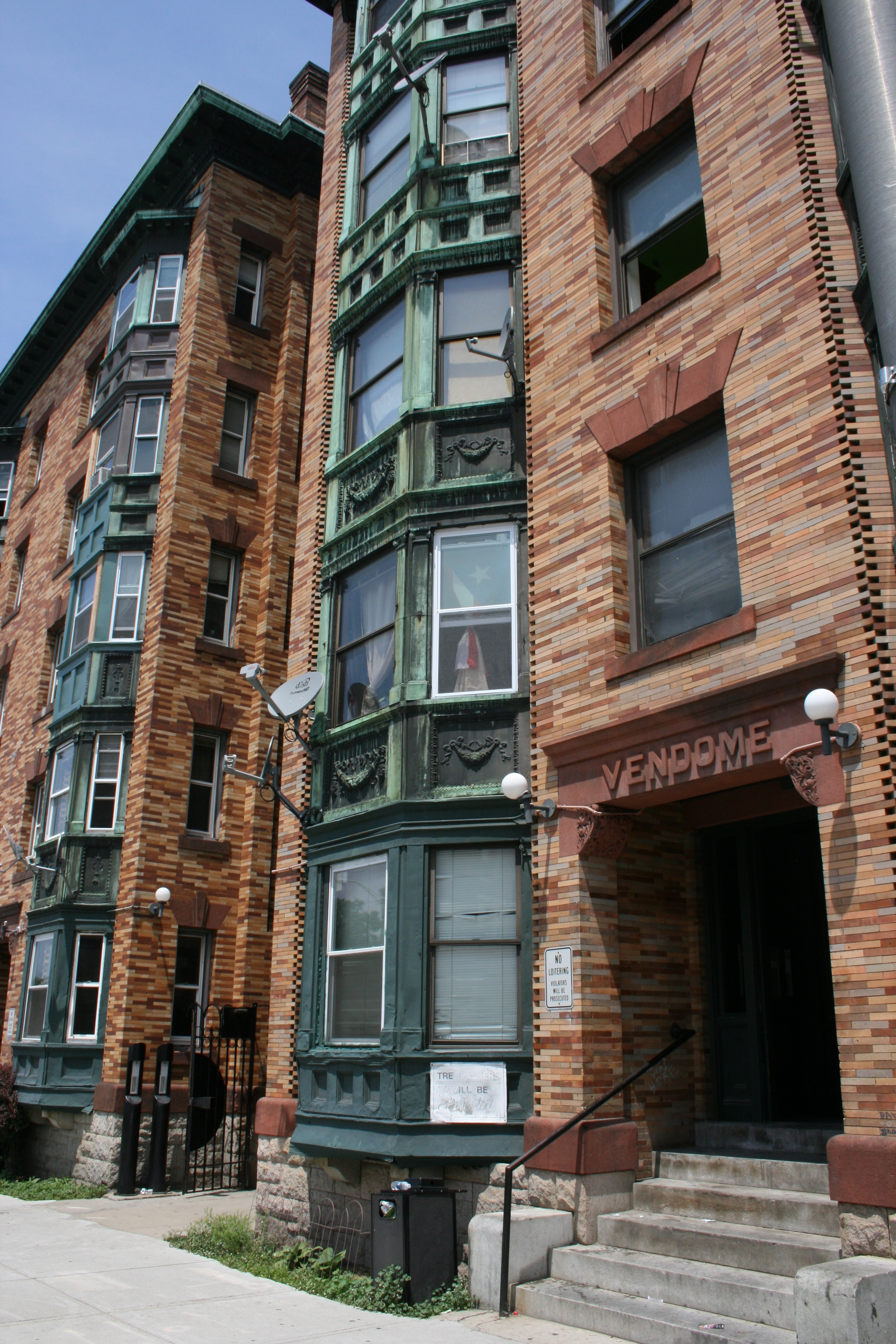

- Location within Massachusetts Location within the United States
- Location: 17–19 and 21–23 Chandler St., Worcester, Massachusetts
- Coordinates: 42°15′33″N 71°48′19″W
- Architect: Barker & Nourse, Judson W. Hall
- Architectural style: Classical Revival
- MPS: Worcester MRA
- NRHP reference No.: 89002331
- Added to NRHP: February 9, 1990

The Vendome and the St. Ives are a pair of historic residential apartment houses in Worcester, Massachusetts. The Vendome (17-19 Chandler) was built in 1898 by Judson W. Hall to a design by the noted local architectural firm of Barker & Nourse, on property where Hall previously had a house. The five-story building is primarily faced in Roman brick, with pressed-metal bay windows, sandstone lintels, and decorative sandstone panels. The St. Ives (21-23 Chandler) was built c. 1913, also for Hall. It is stylistically similar to its neighbor, but is slightly wider, possessing two central window bays where The Vendome has one.

The buildings were listed on the National Register of Historic Places in 1990.

== See also ==
- National Register of Historic Places listings in southwestern Worcester, Massachusetts
- National Register of Historic Places listings in Worcester County, Massachusetts
