= English High School (Worcester, Massachusetts) =

- U.S. National Register of Historic Places
- Classical High School
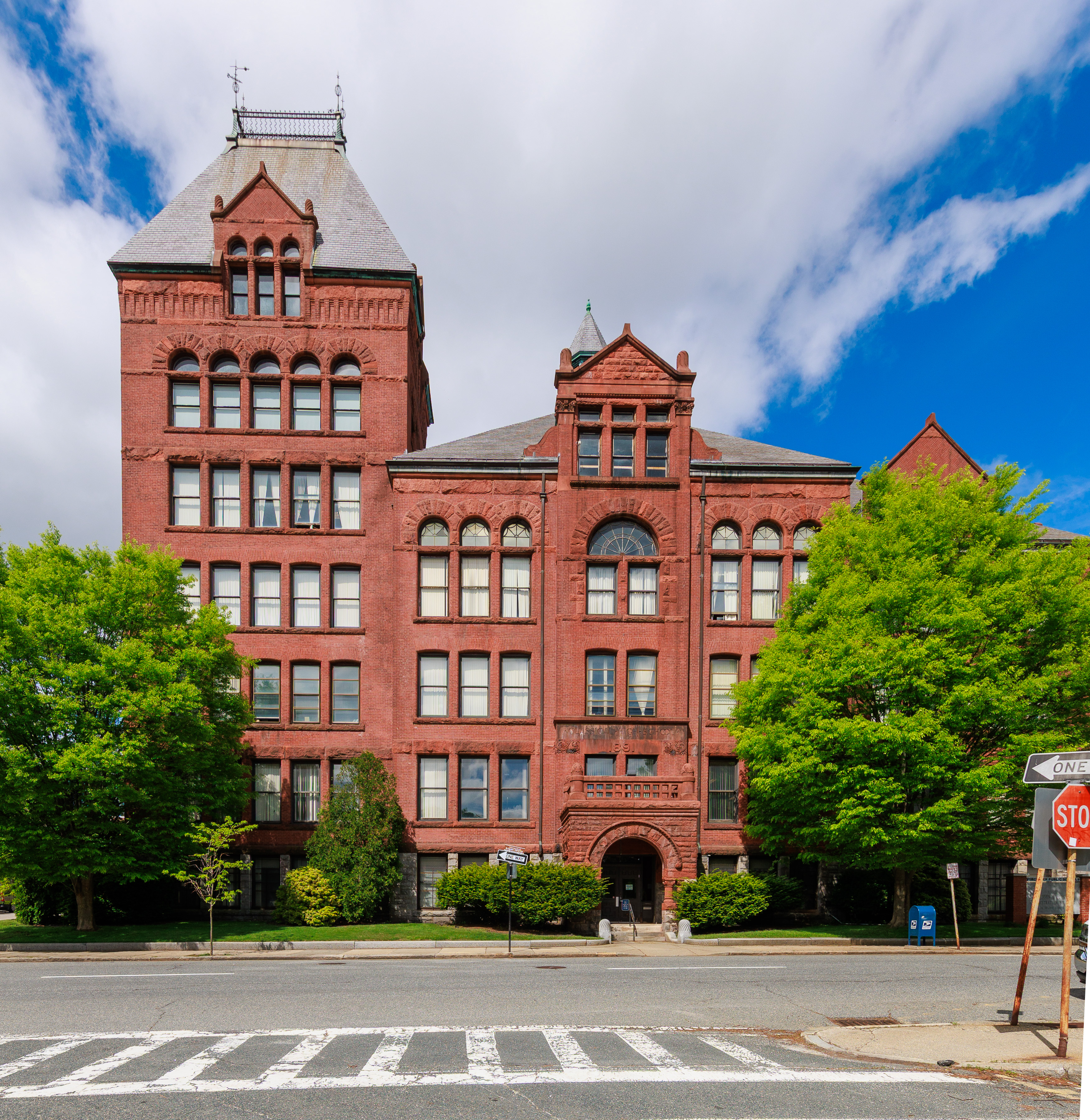

- Location within Massachusetts Location within the United States
- Location: 20 Irving St., Worcester, Massachusetts
- Coordinates: 42°15′45″N 71°48′26″W
- Area: 1 acre (0.40 ha)
- Built: 1891
- Architect: Barker & Nourse
- Architectural style: Romanesque
- MPS: Worcester MRA
- NRHP reference No.: 80000601
- Added to NRHP: March 05, 1980

English High School is an historic high school building at 20 Irving Street in Worcester, Massachusetts. Built in 1891, it is a prominent local example of Romanesque Revival architecture, designed by the local form of Barker & Nourse. It served the city as a high school until 1966, and has housed school administration offices since then. The building was listed on the National Register of Historic Places in 1980.

== Description and history ==
The former English High School building is located a few blocks west of Worcester City Hall, at the northwest corner of Irving and Chatham Streets. It is a large three-story building, built out of brick with sandstone trim. The Romanesque Revival building has rectangular massing, with entrances on Chatham and Irving Streets and a five-story, hip roofed chateau-style tower on the corner. The tower features elaborate brick corbelling, gabled wall dormers on each face, and a ring if iron cresting at the top of the roof. Gable sections have decorative brickwork, and the third story windows have arched heads, a feature continued in other parts of the building's exterior and interior.

The building was constructed in 1891-92 to a design by Barker & Nourse, who featured it in their trade catalog. It was the city's second high school building; the first, designed by H. H. Richardson, is no longer standing. In 1914, English High School was abolished, and the Classical High School moved from the Richardson building into this building. In 1966 Classical was merged with the High School of Commerce, which had occupied the old Richardson building. The merged schools were relocated to the Doherty Memorial High School on Highland Street. Since that time the building has served as the Durkin Administration Building of the Worcester Public Schools.

The building served as a high school building until 1966, and as school offices thereafter.

== Notable alumni ==
- William Howland (1871–1945), operatic bass, voice teacher, composer, conductor and university administrator. Graduated 1889.
- Wedgwood Nowell (1878-1957), film and stage actor

== Notable faculty ==
- G. David Houston (1880-1940), Professor of English at Howard University.

== See also ==
- National Register of Historic Places listings in northwestern Worcester, Massachusetts
- National Register of Historic Places listings in Worcester County, Massachusetts
