= Boynton and Windsor =

- U.S. National Register of Historic Places
- U.S. Historic district – Contributing property
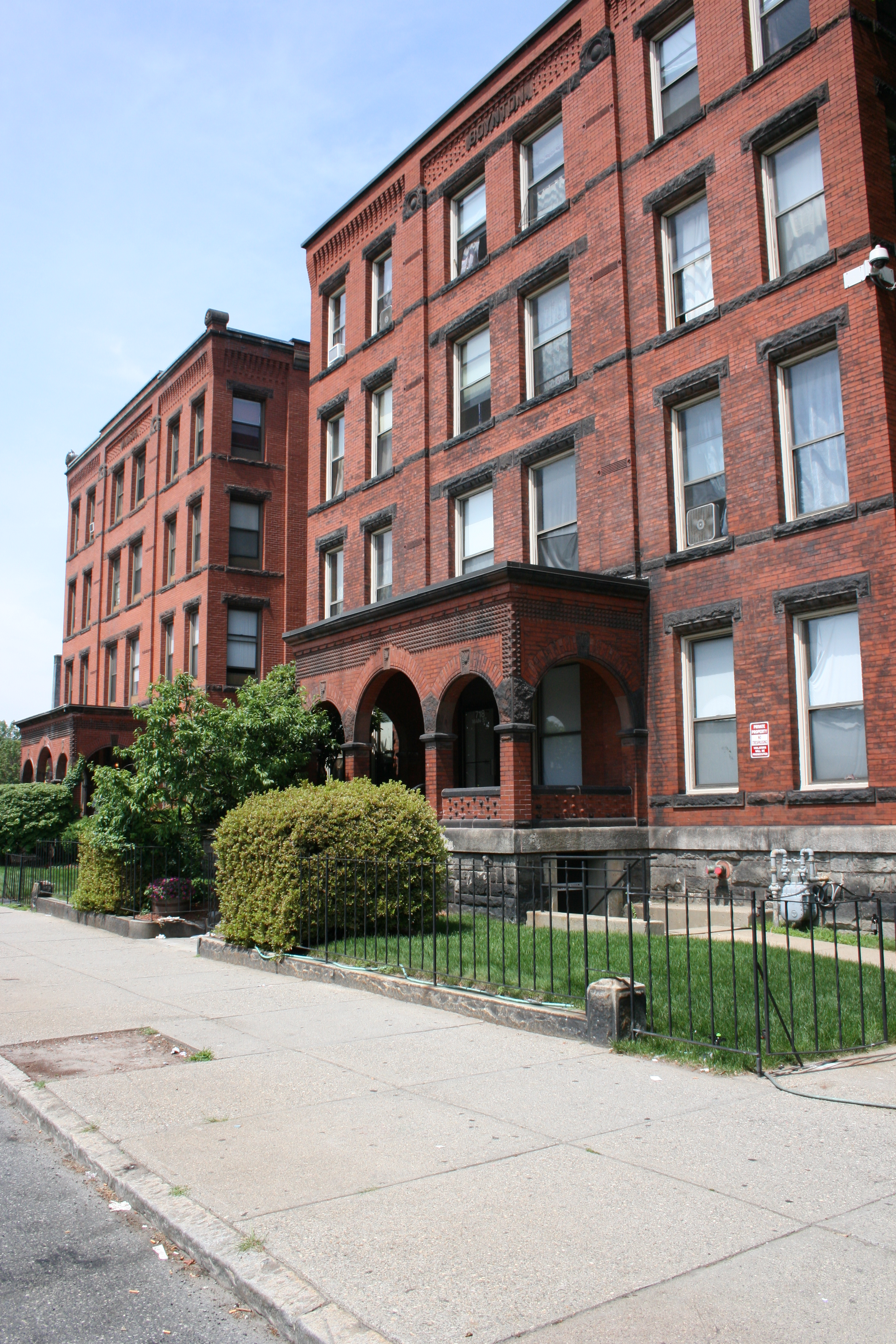

- Location within Massachusetts Location within the United States
- Location: 718 and 720 Main St., Worcester, Massachusetts
- Coordinates: 42°15′28″N 71°48′32″W
- Built: 1887
- Architect: Barker & Nourse
- Architectural style: Late Victorian
- Part of: Main Street and Murray Avenue Historic District (ID100008421)
- MPS: Worcester MRA
- NRHP reference No.: 80000540

Significant dates
- Added to NRHP: March 05, 1980
- Designated CP: December 1, 2022

The Boynton and The Windsor are a pair historic buildings at 718 and 720 Main Street in Worcester, Massachusetts. They are nearly identical brick apartment buildings that were constructed c. 1887 to designs by Barker & Nourse, and are well preserved instances of late 19th century apartment house construction that once lined Main Street for many blocks. Of the two the Boynton (718 Main Street) is the better preserved, with an unaltered exterior.

The buildings were listed on the National Register of Historic Places in 1980, and were included in the Main Street and Murray Avenue Historic District in 2022.

== See also ==
- Wellington Street Apartment House District, a cluster of similar vintage apartment houses
- National Register of Historic Places listings in southwestern Worcester, Massachusetts
- National Register of Historic Places listings in Worcester County, Massachusetts
