= Founder's Hall (Lancaster, Massachusetts) =

- U.S. National Register of Historic Places
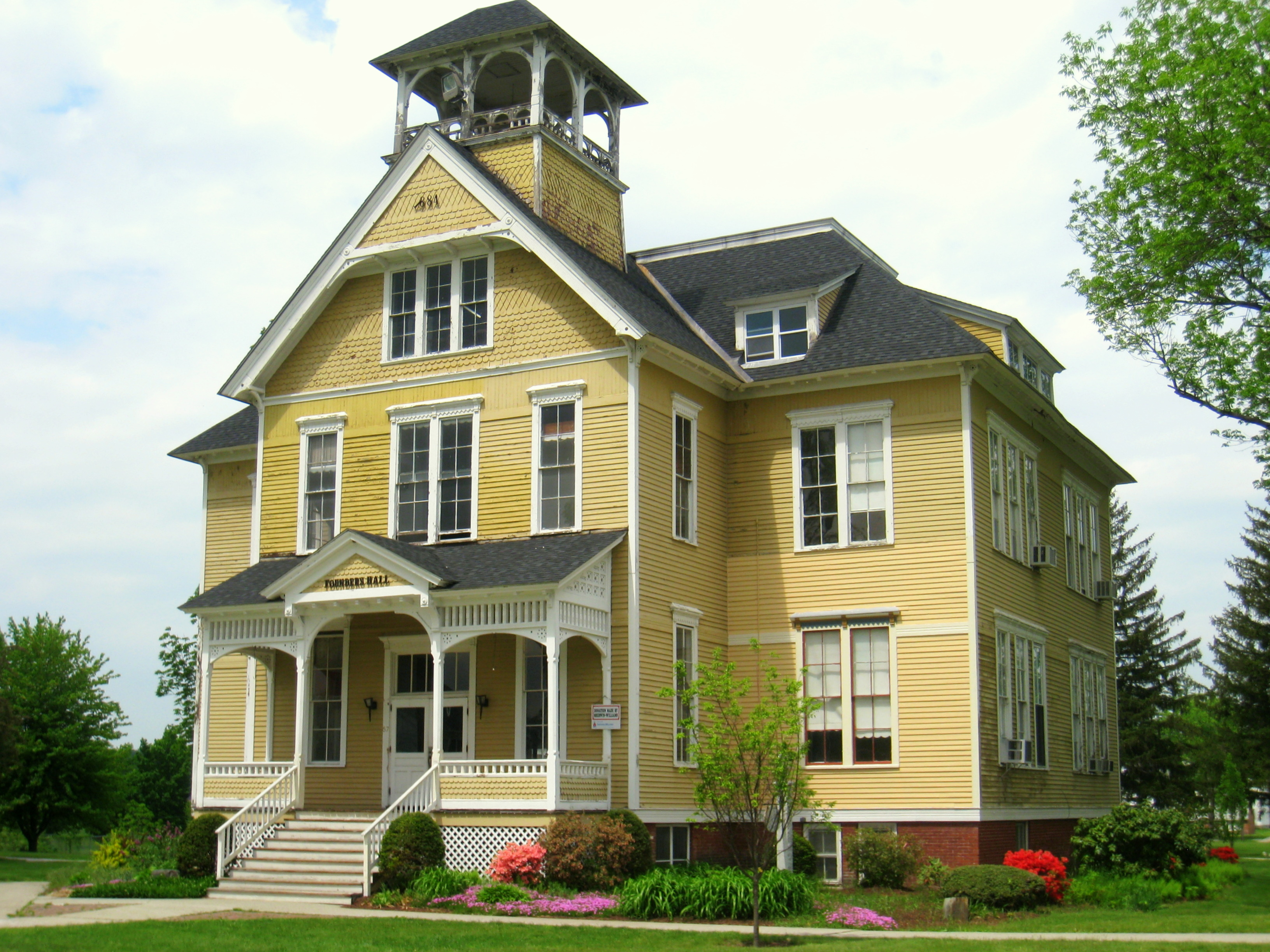

- Location within Massachusetts Location within the United States
- Location: Lancaster, Massachusetts
- Coordinates: 42°26′42″N 71°41′10″W
- Area: less than one acre
- Built: 1883
- Architect: Barker & Nourse
- Architectural style: Gothic Revival, Queen Anne
- NRHP reference No.: 80001678
- Added to NRHP: April 14, 1980

Founder's Hall, also known as Haskell Hall, is a historic academic building located on the campus of Atlantic Union College in Lancaster, Massachusetts, United States. Constructed in 1883, it holds the distinction for being the oldest educational building constructed for a Seventh-day Adventist institution. The notable building was added to the National Register of Historic Places in 1980, recognizing its significance in American history and architecture.

== Description and history ==
Founder's Hall is situated near the center of the Atlantic Union College campus, located on the west side of Main Street (Massachusetts Route 70) in South Lancaster, Massachusetts. It is a charming 2.5-story wood-frame building, with a hip roof and a projecting gable section crowned by a square tower. This tower has an open upper level, with arched openings supported by square posts. A shed-roof porch, adorned with Victorian trim, extends across the projecting section. The building's exterior has remained largely intact, with the only significant modifications being the addition of small exit doors which provide access to an iron fire escape staircase.

Originally known as South Lancaster Academy, the school was established in 1883 by Stephen N. Haskell, an elder of the Seventh-day Adventist (SDA) church. The building was designed by Worcester architects Barker & Nourse, and is the oldest educational SDA facility standing. It was built using mainly donated labor, from wood cut nearby. The building has seen a succession of educational uses, housing the music department and religion center, as well as a collection of SDA memorabilia. The institution changed names, first to Lancaster Junior College, and then to Atlantic Union College, whose administrative offices it now houses.

== See also ==
- National Register of Historic Places listings in Worcester County, Massachusetts
