= Aurora Hotel (Worcester, Massachusetts) =

- U.S. National Register of Historic Places
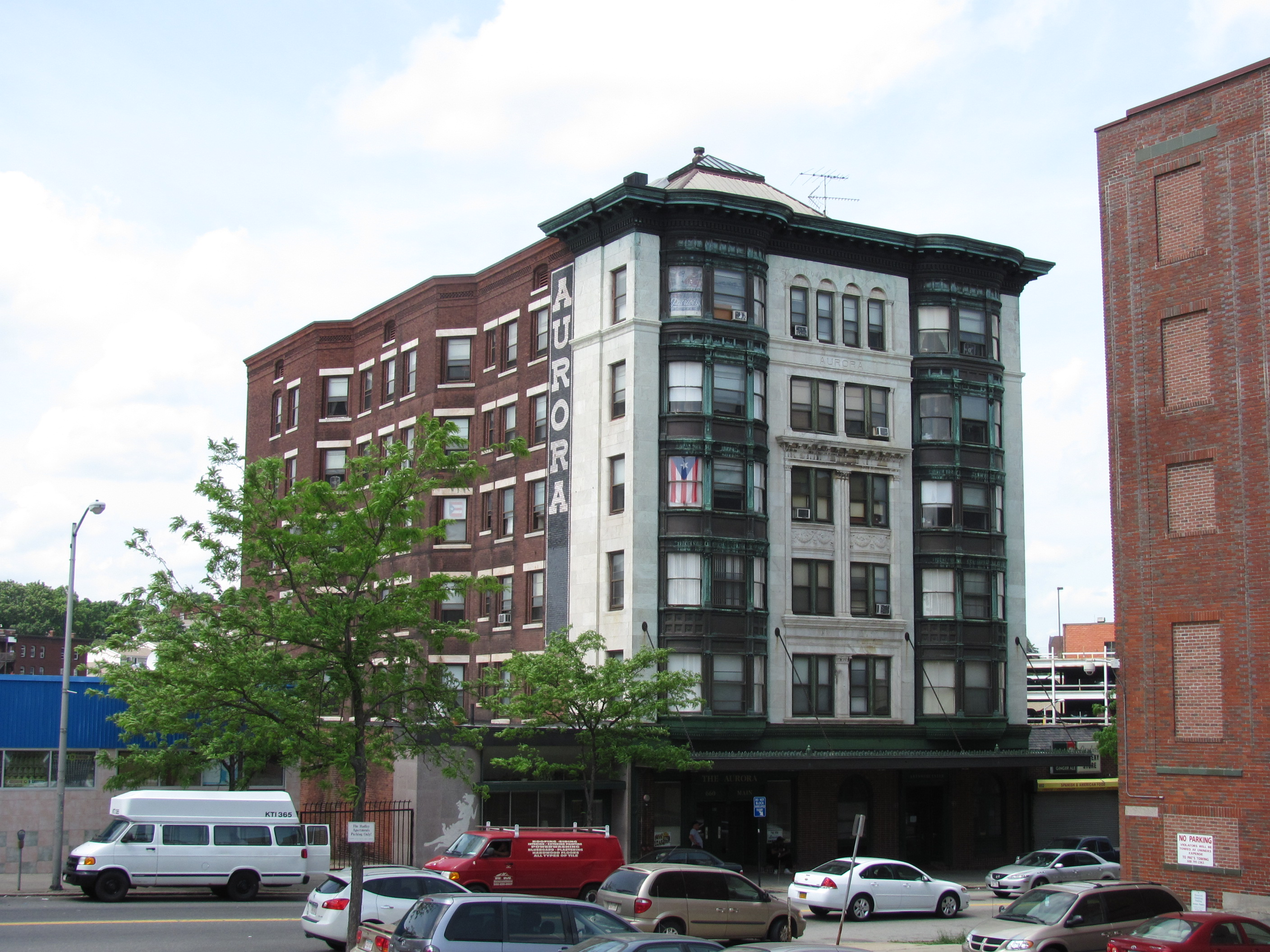
- Aurora Hotel

- Location within Massachusetts Location within the United States
- Location: 652-660 Main St., Worcester, Massachusetts
- Coordinates: 42°15′34″N 71°48′20.48″W
- Built: 1897
- Architect: Barker & Nourse
- Architectural style: Classical Revival
- MPS: Worcester MRA
- NRHP reference No.: 88000429
- Added to NRHP: April 28, 1988

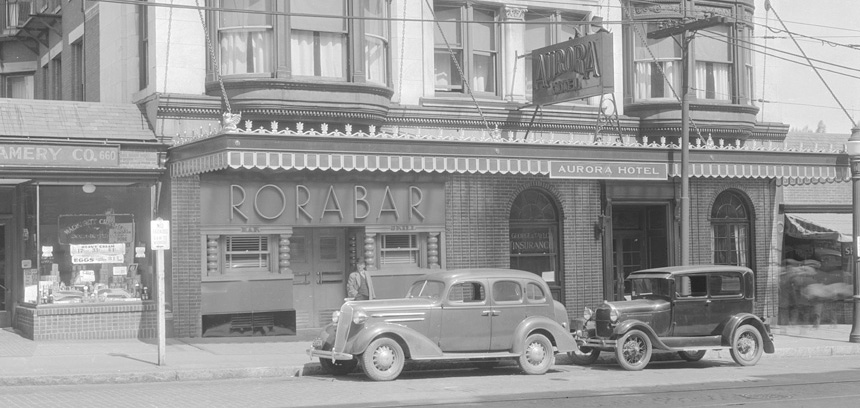
Rora Bar in the Roaring 20s at the Aurora Hotel in Worcester, MA. This place had a big jazz scene.

The Aurora Hotel is a historic hotel building at 652-660 Main Street in Worcester, Massachusetts. The six story Classical Revival building was built in 1898 for Charles Stevens, son of a Worcester businessman, who was a lawyer and major landowner in the city. It features decorative carved stone panels, bay windows with pressed metal ornamentation, and a pressed metal cornice. in 1929 and 1940 the hotel went through renovations but by 1979 many of the rooms suffered from damaged walls and ceilings so in October 1982 the hotel closed. The building was sold in 1985 and converted to apartments.

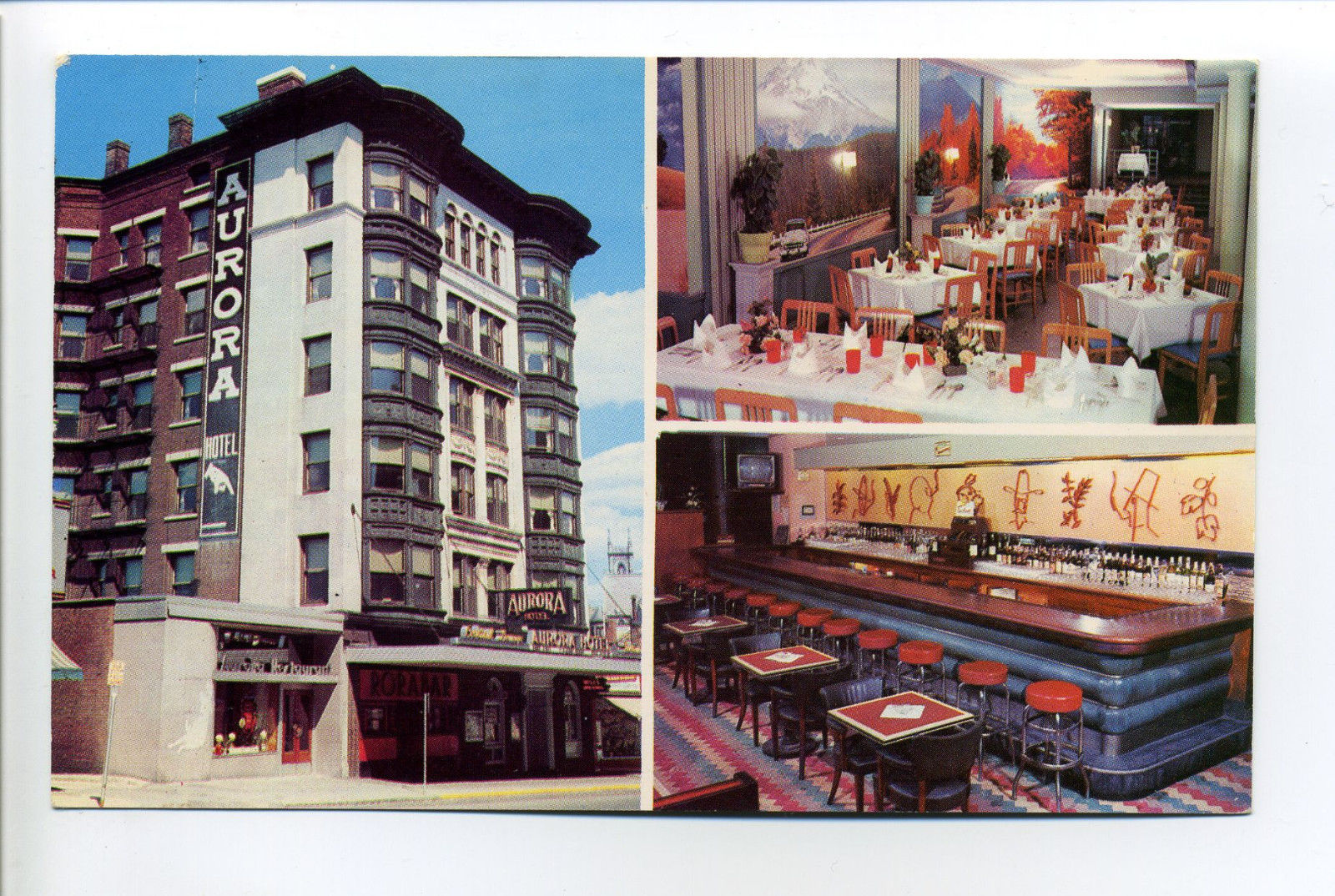
Aurora Hotel in Worcester, MA

The building was listed on the National Register of Historic Places in 1988.

== Aurora Gallery ==
The Aurora Gallery is a contemporary art gallery operated by ArtsWorcester in the Aurora Hotel.

== See also ==
- National Register of Historic Places listings in southwestern Worcester, Massachusetts
- National Register of Historic Places listings in Worcester County, Massachusetts
