= Alpha M. Cheney House =

Historic house in Massachusetts, United States

- U.S. National Register of Historic Places
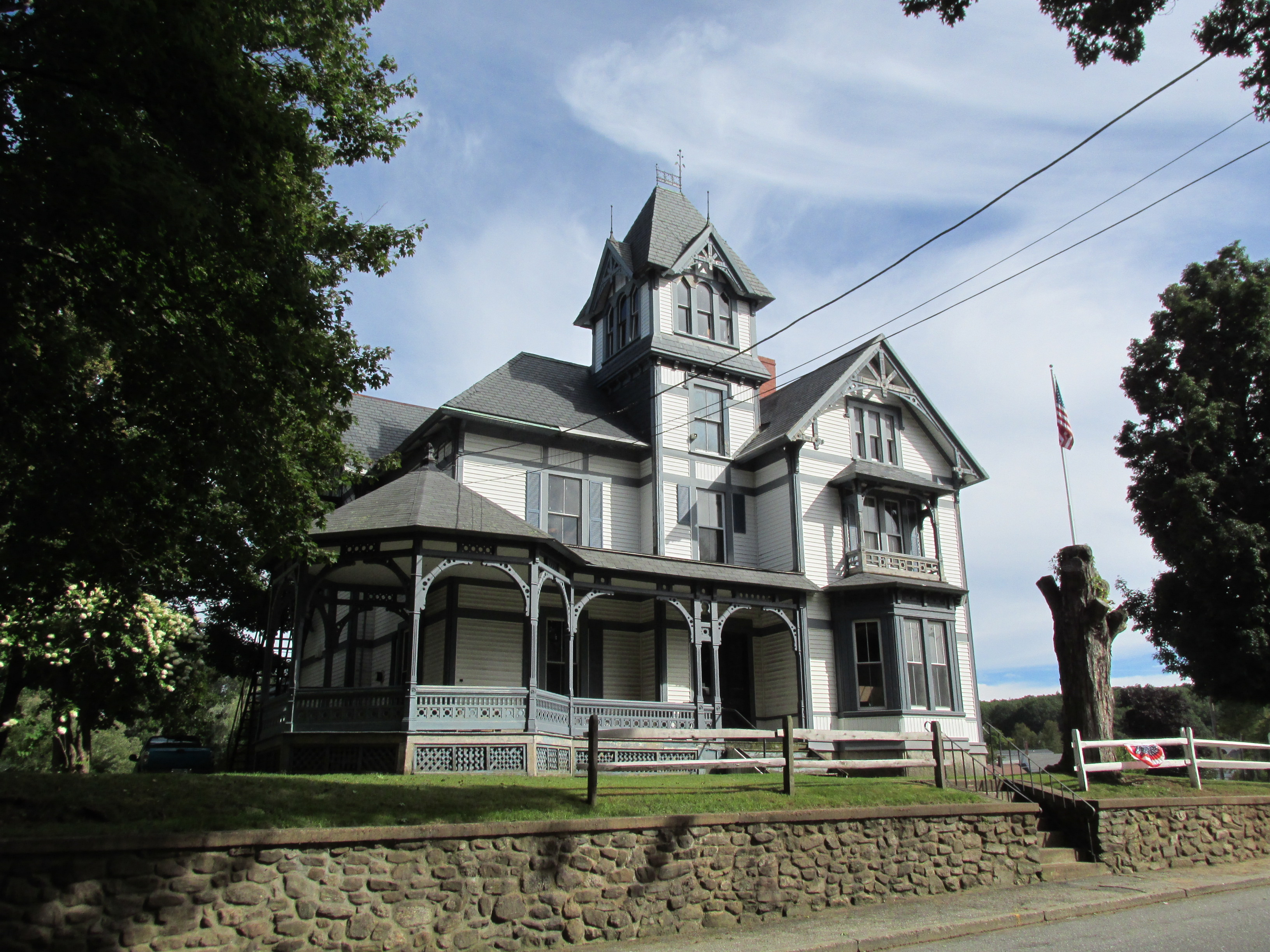
- Alpha M. Cheney House

- Location within Massachusetts Location within the United States
- Location: 61 Chestnut St., Southbridge, Massachusetts
- Coordinates: 42°4′16″N 72°1′39″W
- Area: 1 acre (0.40 ha)
- Built: 1881
- Architect: Barker & Nourse
- Architectural style: Stick/Eastlake
- MPS: Southbridge MRA
- NRHP reference No.: 89000526
- Added to NRHP: June 22, 1989

The Alpha M. Cheney House is a historic house at 61 Chestnut Street in Southbridge, Massachusetts. It was built in 1881 for Alpha M. Cheney, then one of the largest shareholders in American Optical Company, one of Southbridge's largest employers. Designed by Barker & Nourse of Worcester, the house is one of Southbridge's best surviving examples of high Victorian Gothic styling. The property was listed on the National Register of Historic Places in 1989.

== Description and history ==
Alpha M. Cheney (1834-1897) was the son of a local deacon, and received his education at Nichols Academy before beginning employment in the spectacle manufacturing trade. He acquired an interest in R. H. Cole, probably after working there, and was one of the principals in the founding in 1869 of the American Optical Company. At his death he was reported to have "a large amount of property including one of the finest private residences in Southbridge."

Cheney's house occupies a large lot at the northeast corner of Chestnut and Cisco Streets in a residential area east of downtown Southbridge. The house is 2 1/2 stories in height, with steep gables that are ornamented with Stick style decorations. It has a turret with a projecting gables on the four sides of the steep roof, and a projecting front porch with ornamented railings and turned posts. The property also includes a carriage house that was built around the same time, and is similarly styled.

The house was built in 1881 to a design by Barker & Nourse of Worcester. At the time, Chestnut Street only had a few houses on it, including a series of houses across the street which Cheney had apparently built as worker housing on his estate. This was a common means by which other leading businessmen in Southbridge provided housing for their workers.

== See also ==
- National Register of Historic Places listings in Southbridge, Massachusetts
- National Register of Historic Places listings in Worcester County, Massachusetts
