= Alyne Dumas Lee =

American Lyric soprano soloist (1903–1970)

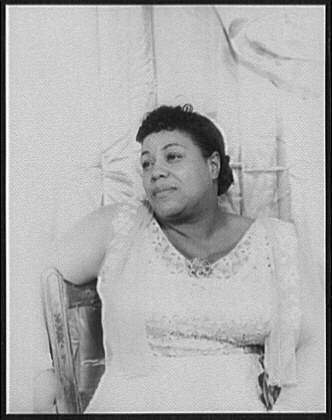
- Born: March 22, 1903; Knoxville, Tennessee
- Died: March 30, 1970 (aged 67)
- Occupation: lyric soprano soloist

Alyne Dumas Lee (March 22, 1903 – March 30, 1970) was an American lyric soprano soloist.

== Biography ==
Lee was born in Knoxville, Tennessee on March 22, 1903. She attended Oakwood Junior College and the Detroit Institute of Musical Arts.

Important performances include her 1948 debut at the Detroit Art Institute Lecture Hall and a 1952 performance at Town Hall in New York City. Lee was an Artist in Residence at Oakwood University from 1966 through 1970. She was married to John Frank Lee and was active in the Seventh-day Adventist Church.

Lee died on March 30, 1970.
