= Odd Fellows' Home (Worcester, Massachusetts) =

- U.S. National Register of Historic Places
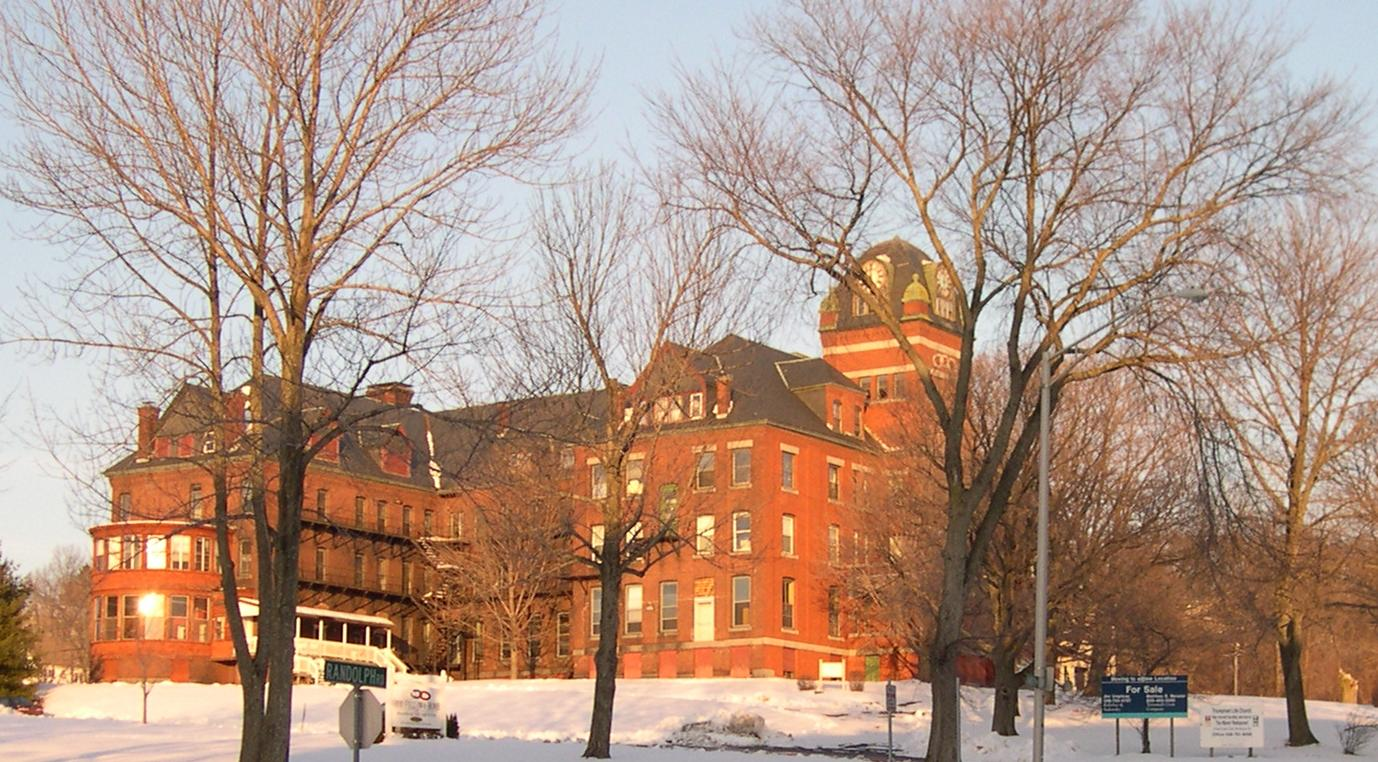
- The historic building, 2006 photo

- Location within Massachusetts Location within the United States
- Location: 104 Randolph Rd., Worcester, Massachusetts
- Coordinates: 42°17′56″N 71°47′51″W
- Area: 7 acres (2.8 ha)
- Built: 1890
- Architect: Barker & Nourse
- Architectural style: Late Victorian
- MPS: Worcester MRA
- NRHP reference No.: 80000513
- Added to NRHP: March 05, 1980

The Odd Fellows' Home is a historic Odd Fellows charitable home at 104 Randolph Road in Worcester, Massachusetts. Opened in 1892, it continues to serve as a home for elderly and disabled operated by Odd Fellows Home, Inc. Its original campus, now demolished, was listed on the National Register of Historic Places in 1980. It is now housed in a modern facility, opened in 1990, with 100 beds, located on the same property.

== Location and building history ==
The Odd Fellows' Home is located in northeastern Worcester, a short way east of Interstate 190 and the Greendale Mall, at the corner of Barber and Randolph Streets. The land for the facility was donated in 1890 by Thomas Dodge, a prominent local patent lawyer, who eventually donated 24 acres (9.7 ha) in all, in order ensure "ample light and air" for the residents.

The original main building was a large three story brick building built in 1890-92 to a design by Barker & Nourse. The most prominent feature was a projecting 5-1/2 story mansard-roofed tower with round-topped clock dormers projecting from the half story mansard. The front bays were divided by brick pilasters, and a single-story porch extended across part of the front. To this building's right (east) was the first major addition, added in 1902; it was a 2-1/2 story brick Classical Revival structure that increased the facility's capacity to 110 beds. Its facade had limestone quoining, and it had a Classical Revival entry porch with Tuscan columns.

The old facility was sold in 2012 to a development firm, and was demolished in 2014 to provide added facilities to the adjacent Dodge Park Rest Home. Materials from the building were salvaged for use in other settings.

== See also ==
- National Register of Historic Places listings in eastern Worcester, Massachusetts
