= Paul Brodie =

Canadian saxophonist (1934–2007)

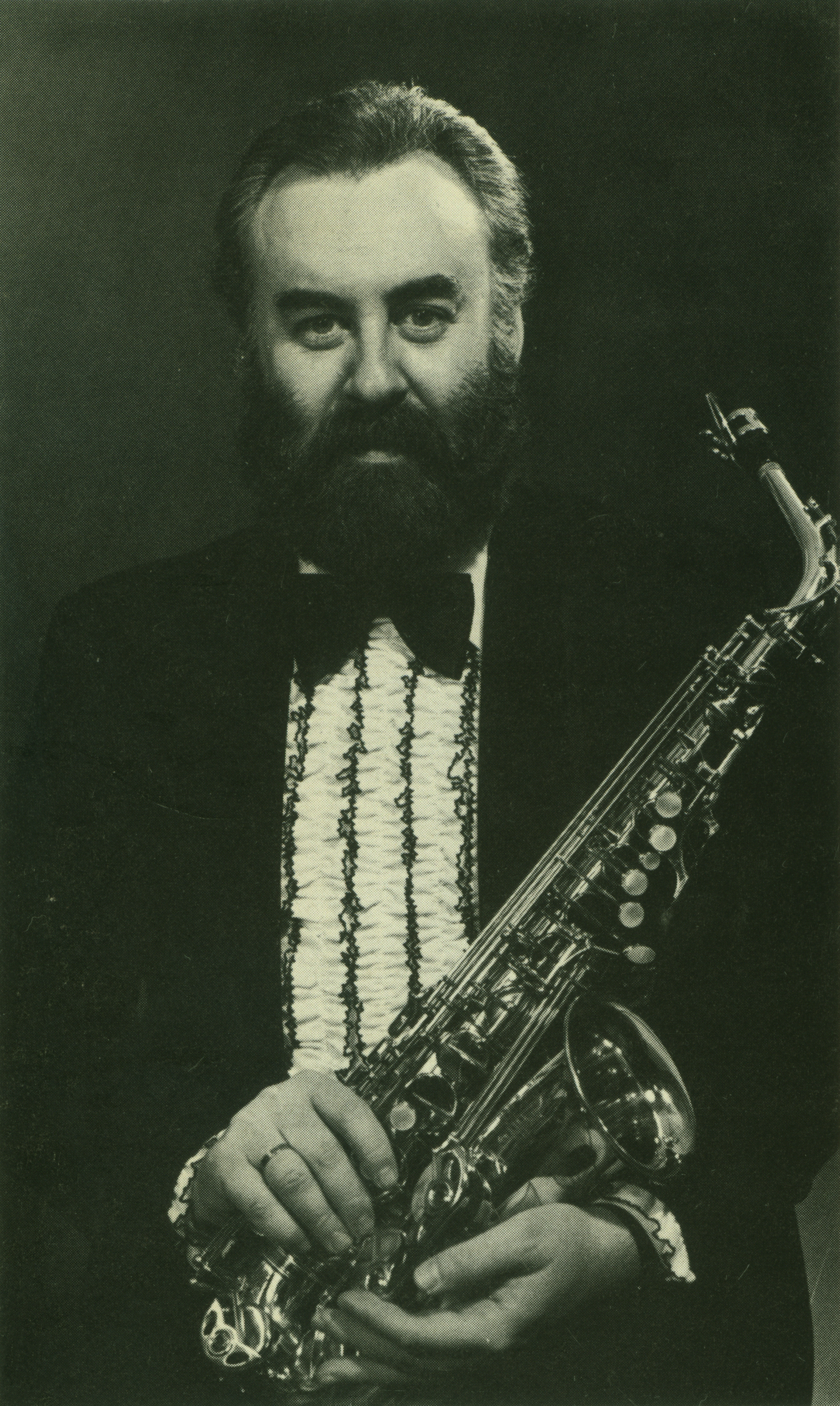
- Brodie c. 1982

Background information
- Born: April 10, 1934; Montreal, Quebec, Canada
- Died: November 19, 2007 (aged 73); Toronto, Ontario, Canada
- Instrument: Saxophone

Paul Brodie, OC (April 10, 1934 – November 19, 2007) was a Canadian saxophonist, pupil of Larry Teal and then Marcel Mule. In 1994, he was made an Officer of the Order of Canada, Canada's highest civilian honour, for having "shown true mastery of his art through his ability to reach all ages with his music".

Since 1960, he performed over 3000 concerts in Canada, United States, Mexico, France, England, India, Singapore, Hong Kong, the Philippines, Israel, Australia, China, Italy, Scotland, Russia and Argentina (1998). He is a very heavily recorded concert saxophonist - with 50 albums recorded for Golden Crest Records, CBC International Service, CBC Enterprise, Truly Fine Records, Classic Edition, Music Minus One, China Records, Dinant Records, and ROI Records (Hong Kong).

Warren Beatty featured his saxophone playing on the soundtrack of his Academy Award-winning film Heaven Can Wait. He was also included on Clyde Gilmour's Favourites, an album celebrating Clyde Gilmour's 25 years on one of the most famous programs ever heard on CBC Radio. Brodie has appeared as a soloist with most of the leading orchestras in Canada and has often been featured on CBC Radio, CBC Stereo, CBC Television, CTV and Global. In 1980, he commissioned Ben Steinberg to write Suite Sephardi for him.

Asked in 1984 about his 1950s undergraduate study with Larry Teal at The University of Michigan, Brodie replied: "The most important thing I learned from Larry was a sense of self-discipline. The first 500 times a student plays an exercise is the introduction; the second 500 times is the repetition. To a student who likes to flip from one thing to the next without perfecting anything this is a shock. A musician must learn to take a piece of music apart. This takes great patience and much time. Larry was a terrific technical teacher who demanded perfection. He had a plan for each student, a well-organized progression from one skill to another. He was a real pedagogue and certainly my experience with him was one of the greatest experiences I had in my entire education."

Concerning his tutelage with Marcel Mule, Brodie said: "I certainly think the most important teacher I had was Larry Teal because he taught me how to play, how to read, how to count, and how to develop myself as a musician. But when I went to study with Marcel Mule, I met an artist, probably the greatest artist that the saxophone has had in this century. Hearing him play was a lesson in itself in sound and interpretation. Therefore, the skills we worked on were primarily interpretive and artistic."

He is the author of A Student's Guide to the Saxophone, as well as three books of saxophone solos published by Frederick Harris Music. In 1969, Brodie co-founded with Eugene Rousseau, another pupil of Marcel Mule, the World Saxophone Congress and he has been an artist/clinician for The Selmer Company of the US for over 30 years.

== Discography ==
LPs

- Paul Brodie – A Saxophone Concert (RE 7090) [1979]
- Paul Brodie – Baroque and Classical Music for Soprano Saxophone (RE 7041) [1971]
- Paul Brodie – Clinician Series (CRS 1010)
- Paul Brodie – Encores! (RE 7102) [1982]
- Paul Brodie – Koechlin Etudes for Alto Saxophone and Piano (CE 16) [1974]
- Paul Brodie – More Encores! (RE 7103) [1982]
- Paul Brodie – Mr. Saxophone and the Three Bears (CRS 31057)
- Paul Brodie – Music Minus One, Vol. 1 (MMO 8021) [1973]
- Paul Brodie – Music Minus One, Vol. 2 (MMO 8023) [1973]
- Paul Brodie – Music Minus One, Vol. 3 (MMO 8025) [1973]
- Paul Brodie – Music Minus One, Vol. 4 (MMO 8027) [1973]
- Paul Brodie – Paul Brodie & Myriam Shechter (RE 7037)
- Paul Brodie – Paul Brodie and Camerata (CRS 4194) [1980]
- Paul Brodie – Paul Brodie Plays Alto and Soprano Saxophone (RE 7056) [1974]
- Paul Brodie – Paul Brodie Plays Sopranino and Soprano Saxophone (RE 7049) [1972]
- Paul Brodie – Paul Brodie Salutes Olde-Tyme Fiddle Music (ATF 016)
- Paul Brodie – Soprano Saxophone and Harp (TF 020) [1988]
- Paul Brodie – The Golden Age of the Saxophone (MVC 1005) [1983]
- Paul Brodie – The Saxophone in Concert ([S]W 6066, RE 7028) [1964, 1968]
- Paul Brodie – Unaccompanied Saxophone (RE 7071) [1977]
- Paul Brodie Saxophone Quartet – A Recital with the Paul Brodie Saxophone Quartet (CRSQ 4143)
- Paul Brodie Saxophone Quartet – The Paul Brodie Saxophone Quartet in Concert (CRSQ 4164)
- Paul Brodie Saxophone Quartet – The Paul Brodie Saxophone Quartet (CRSQ 4131)
- Paul Brodie Saxophone Quartet – The Paul Brodie Saxophone Quartet on Tour (CRSQ 4154)
- Paul Brodie, James Campbell - Sonatas [1974]
- Paul Brodie, James Campbell - Three for All [1982]
- Paul Brodie, Jean-Marie Londeix – Duets for Saxophone (RE 7062) [1975]

CDs

- Paul Brodie – Amigos: Saxophone and Guitar [2004]
- Paul Brodie – Back to the ‘20s [1994]
- Paul Brodie – Bel Canto [2012]
- Paul Brodie – Paul Brodie and Friends [1990]
- Paul Brodie – Paul Brodie Salutes Olde-Tyme Fiddle Music [2000]
- Paul Brodie – The Golden Age of the Saxophone [1991]
- Paul Brodie – The Music of Srul Irving Glick [1996]
- Paul Brodie Saxophone Quartet – The Paul Brodie Saxophone Quartet, Vol. 1 [1992]
- Paul Brodie Saxophone Quartet – The Paul Brodie Saxophone Quartet, Vol. 2 [1992]
- James Campbell (feat. Paul Brodie) - Crossroads [2012]
