= Main Street Historic District (Webster, Massachusetts) =

Historic district in Massachusetts, United States

- U.S. National Register of Historic Places
- U.S. Historic district
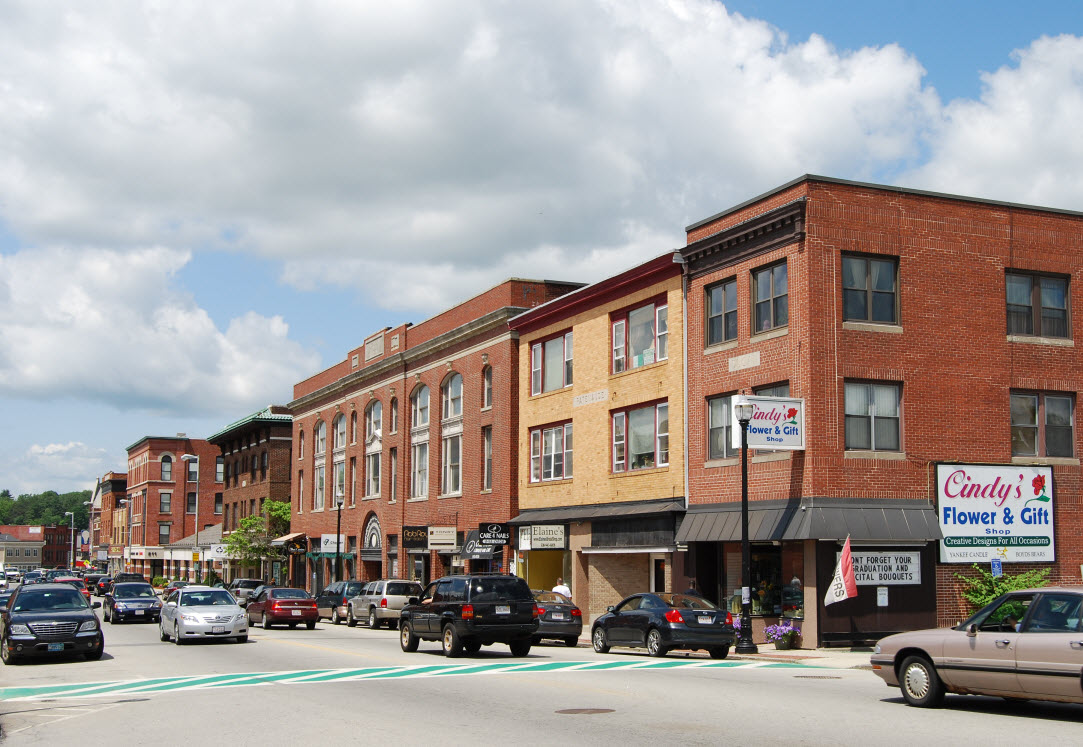

- Location within Massachusetts Location within the United States
- Location: 175-299 and 228-274 Main St., Webster, Massachusetts
- Coordinates: 42°2′57″N 71°52′56″W
- Area: 2 acres (0.81 ha)
- Built: 1888
- Architect: Multiple
- Architectural style: Late 19th And 20th Century Revivals, Late Victorian
- NRHP reference No.: 82004484
- Added to NRHP: April 6, 1982

The Main Street Historic District encompasses the historic late 19th and early 20th-century commercial heart of Webster, Massachusetts. It consists of fourteen buildings on Main Street in downtown Webster, between High and Church Streets. This area contains the highest concentration of period commercial buildings in the town. The district was listed on the National Register of Historic Places in 1982.

== Description and history ==
The town of Webster was settled in 1713 as part of Dudley, from which it was separated in 1832. The densely built portion of its downtown is located south and east of a bend in the French River, on an east-west stretch of Main Street. Originally residential in character, the first commercial block was built here 1888. By 1905 the area had acquired a more distinctly commercial character, with several commercial or mixed residential-commercial buildings on both sides of the street. Development between 1912 and 1925 solidified the area's commercial character. Business declined in the downtown after World War II, when suburban shopping centers began to draw economic activity away.

The historic district consists of fourteen buildings, of which eight are on the north side of Main Street between High and Church Streets. When the district was listed on the National Register in 1982, there were ten in this area; two have since been demolished. On the south side of the street there are six buildings, clustered opposite Tracy Court. All are between two and four stories in height, and of masonry construction, generally brick with stone trim. Stylistically they are in a diversity of styles popular in the late 19th and early 20th centuries, including the Classical Revival, Queen Anne, and Renaissance Revival. One of the buildings includes within it the structure of an 1875 Italianate house.

== See also ==
- National Register of Historic Places listings in Worcester County, Massachusetts
