= Mary Rambaran-Olm =

Scholar of early medieval literature

Academic background
- Education: University of Calgary (BA); University of St Andrews (MLitt); University of Glasgow (PhD)
- Thesis: John's Prayer: an edition, literary analysis and commentary (2012)
- Doctoral advisor: G. D. Caie

Academic work
- Discipline: Medieval Studies; Literary history
- Institutions: University of Toronto

Mary Rambaran-Olm is a Canadian literary scholar specializing in early medieval England from the fifth to eleventh centuries.

== Early life and education ==
Rambaran-Olm was born and raised in Canada, and is of Afro-Indo-Caribbean descent. In an interview with The Washington Post she credits her father as inspiring her interest in early medieval England. When she was in college she became fascinated with Old English upon reading Beowulf. In 2012, Rambaran-Olm was awarded a PhD from the Department of English at the University of Glasgow for a thesis entitled 'John's Prayer: An edition, literary analysis and commentary', examining a poem in the Exeter Book. She previously studied for a BA in English and History at the University of Calgary and for an MLitt in Medieval Literature at the University of St Andrews.

== Career ==
=== Scholarship ===
Rambaran-Olm was the Provost's Post-doctoral Fellow at the University of Toronto in the Faculty of English and Drama from 2020 to 2022. Her research explored race in early medieval England, drawing on the theoretical frameworks of Stuart Hall and Dipesh Chakrabarty. Her translation of The Descent Into Hell (or John the Baptist's Prayer) was praised as "accurate and readable", as well as bringing new insight into the idea of time in the poem.

Along with Breanne M. Leake and Micah Goodrich, Rambaran-Olm served as a guest editor for the journal Postmedieval's volume Race, Revulsion, and Revolution. As of April 2021, she was also writing a book on race in Early England for Cambridge University Press along with Erik Wade. Along with her academic publications, she has written a number of public-facing works, for History Workshop, Time, and HistoriansSpeak

=== Activism ===
In 2019, she was a speaker at the Race Before Race symposium held at the Folger Shakespeare Library, whose stated aim was to be critical of and imagine pathways for a more inclusive future for medieval and renaissance studies. At this event, she publicly resigned from her position as second vice president of the (as it was named at the time) International Society of Anglo-Saxonists. Rambaran-Olm's resignation came as a result of the organization's reluctance to change its name and other issues she had with the organization, as well as issues within the wider field of early English studies. The proposal to change the name of the International Society of Anglo-Saxonists had first been proposed by Adam Miyashiro in an open letter published on Facebook on July 28, 2017. Her resignation served as a catalyst for the field to begin interrogating its terminology that was criticised as antiquated and what was said to be the historical connection between the term 'Anglo-Saxon' and white supremacist ideologies. As a result of her actions she experienced cyber bullying, racial abuse and threats of bodily attacks. Several academic associations wrote statements of support to Rambaran-Olm, including: Queerdievalists; Society for Medieval Feminist Scholarship; Medievalists of Color; the Islands of the North Atlantic Conference. Rambaran-Olm has also been involved in feminist activism in academia, and spent several years trying to draw attention to Andy Orchard's behaviour before Al Jazeera broke the story about his alleged sexual harassment of students.

=== Bright Ages review controversy ===
In 2022, the Los Angeles Review of Books declined to publish a negative review by Rambaran-Olm of The Bright Ages: A New History of Medieval Europe, which she criticised as a white-centric narrative. The Los Angeles Review of Books later published a positive review of the book, which Boris Dralyuk, the Review's editor in chief, stated had been commissioned before the review by Rambaran-Olm.

Rambaran-Olm later posted her review on Medium and also posted parts of her email correspondence with the editors on Twitter. Sarah Bond, who commissioned the review, accused her of giving a selective version of the facts and pushed back against the idea that the refusal of the review had anything to do with whiteness or protecting the book authors. Others became involved in the controversy, and two scholars falsely claimed Rambaran-Olm lied about her race and was not part Black. Bond later apologised, condemned the racist attacks against Rambaran-Olm, and deleted her Twitter account.

== Selected publications ==
- "Is the title of the Old English poem "The Descent into Hell" suitable?." Selim 13 (2005): 73-86.
- John the Baptist's Prayer, Or, 'The Descent Into Hell' from the Exeter Book: Text, Translation and Critical Study (Woodbridge: Boydell and Brewer, 2014).
- "The advantages and disadvantages of digital reconstruction and 'Anglo-Saxon' manuscripts." Digital Medievalist, 2015.
- Medievalism and the 'Flayed-Dane' Myth: English Perspectives between the Seventeenth and Nineteenth Centuries." in Flaying in the Premodern World: Practice and Representation, ed. by L. Tracy (Cambridge: D.S. Brewer, 2017).
- "Introduction: Race, Revulsion and Revolution", Postmedieval, 11.4, 2020. co-edited with Dr. Breann M Leake and Dr. Micah Goodrich.
- "A Wrinkle in Medieval Time: Ironing Out the Problems of Periodization, Gatekeeping, and "Others" in Early English Studies," New Literary History, Spring 2022.
- Mary Rambaran-Olm and Erik Wade, 'The Many Myths of the Term 'Anglo-Saxon', Smithsonian Magazine,15 July 2021
