= Wellington Street Apartment House District =

Historic district in Massachusetts, United States

- U.S. National Register of Historic Places
- U.S. Historic district
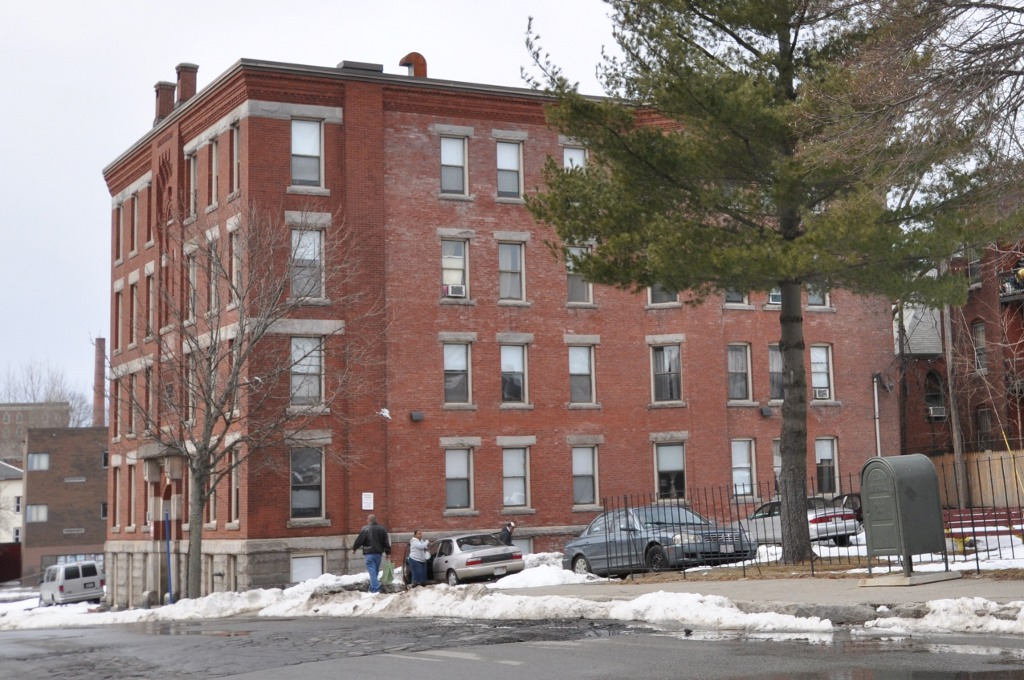
- 6 Jacques Ave.

- Location within Massachusetts Location within the United States
- Location: Properties along Jacques Ave., and Wellington and Irving Sts., Worcester, Massachusetts
- Coordinates: 42°15′35″N 71°48′34″W
- Built: 1885
- Architect: Harvey, W. H.
- Architectural style: Queen Anne, Romanesque
- MPS: Worcester MRA
- NRHP reference No.: 80000539
- Added to NRHP: March 05, 1980

The Wellington Street Apartment House District of Worcester, Massachusetts encompasses a collection of stylistically similar apartment houses in the city's Main South area. It includes sixteen properties along Jacques Avenue, and Wellington and Irving Streets, most of which were built between 1887 and 1901. The notable exception is the Harrington House at 62 Wellington Street, a c. 1850s Greek Revival house that was virtually the only house standing in the area before development began in the 1880s.

The first other building in the area was also a single family residence, the brick and stone Queen Anne Victorian built in 1855 by Thomas Barrett at 41 Wellington. This was followed in the next few years by six smaller apartment houses that were built with floor plans similar to Worcester's many wood frame triple deckers, but they were built of brick and trimmed in stone. These buildings (23, 25, 37, and 45 Wellington, and 1 and 5 Jacques) were generally owner-occupied.

The development that followed these early buildings was done by developers building income properties, which were larger (at least two apartments per floor), and followed a central hall plan that such apartment blocks followed elsewhere in the city. These were built of brick or stone, and generally trimmed in stone. The only non-residential building in the district is the Gothic Revival First Freewill Baptist Church, designed by Lawrence, Massachusetts architect George G. Adams and built in 1888.

The district was listed on the National Register of Historic Places in 1980.

== See also ==
- National Register of Historic Places listings in southwestern Worcester, Massachusetts
- National Register of Historic Places listings in Worcester County, Massachusetts
