= Beaver Street Historic District =

Historic district in Massachusetts, United States

- U.S. National Register of Historic Places
- U.S. Historic district
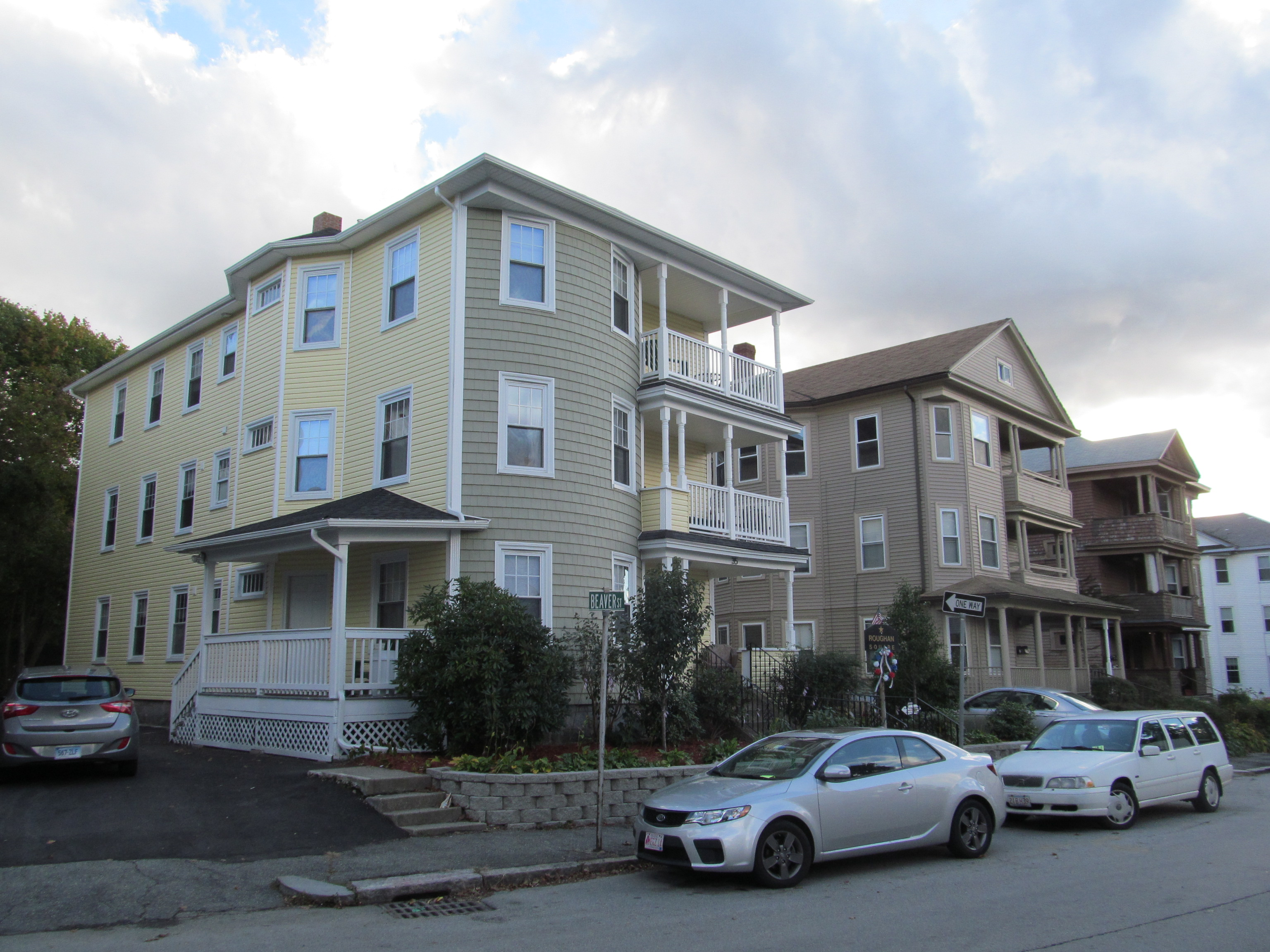
- 35 Beaver Street

- Location within Massachusetts Location within the United States
- Location: 31–39 Beaver St., Worcester, Massachusetts
- Coordinates: 42°14′58″N 71°49′38″W
- Built: 1916
- Architectural style: Colonial Revival
- MPS: Worcester Three-Deckers TR
- NRHP reference No.: 89002377
- Added to NRHP: February 9, 1990

The Beaver Street Historic District is a residential historic district in the Main South part of Worcester, Massachusetts. It encompasses a collection of five well preserved Colonial Revival triple-deckers located at 31-39 Beaver Street, and was listed on the National Register of Historic Places in 1990.

== Description and history ==
The five buildings in this Beaver Street subdivision are located just southwest of the Clark University campus in southern Worcester, near the junction of Beaver Street with Florence and Oliver Streets. They are set on the southeast side of the street, running northeasterly from Clement Street. All were built c. 1916, at a time when Worcester's more fashionable development was moving from the Woodland Street area to the west side, and when the streetcar made the Main South area more readily accessible to factory workers. The typical early owners and occupants of them were Irish American families where the men were laborers or machinists, and the women who worked outside the home had office jobs.

The five buildings are identical in their basic structure, a rectangular three-story wood-frame building with a side hall entry, and protruding bay sections on the front and left side. All have front porches that rise to three stories, but the decorative details and number of supporting columns differ among them. 37 Beaver Street is distinctive in the group for having a full-width first-floor porch and a gable end with full pediment, while numbers 31 and 35 have first-floor side porches sheltering the entry. At the time of their listing in 1990 all were clad in wood clapboards and shingles.

== See also ==
- National Register of Historic Places listings in southwestern Worcester, Massachusetts
- National Register of Historic Places listings in Worcester County, Massachusetts
