= Jarvesville Historic District =

Historic district in Massachusetts, United States

- U.S. National Register of Historic Places
- U.S. Historic district
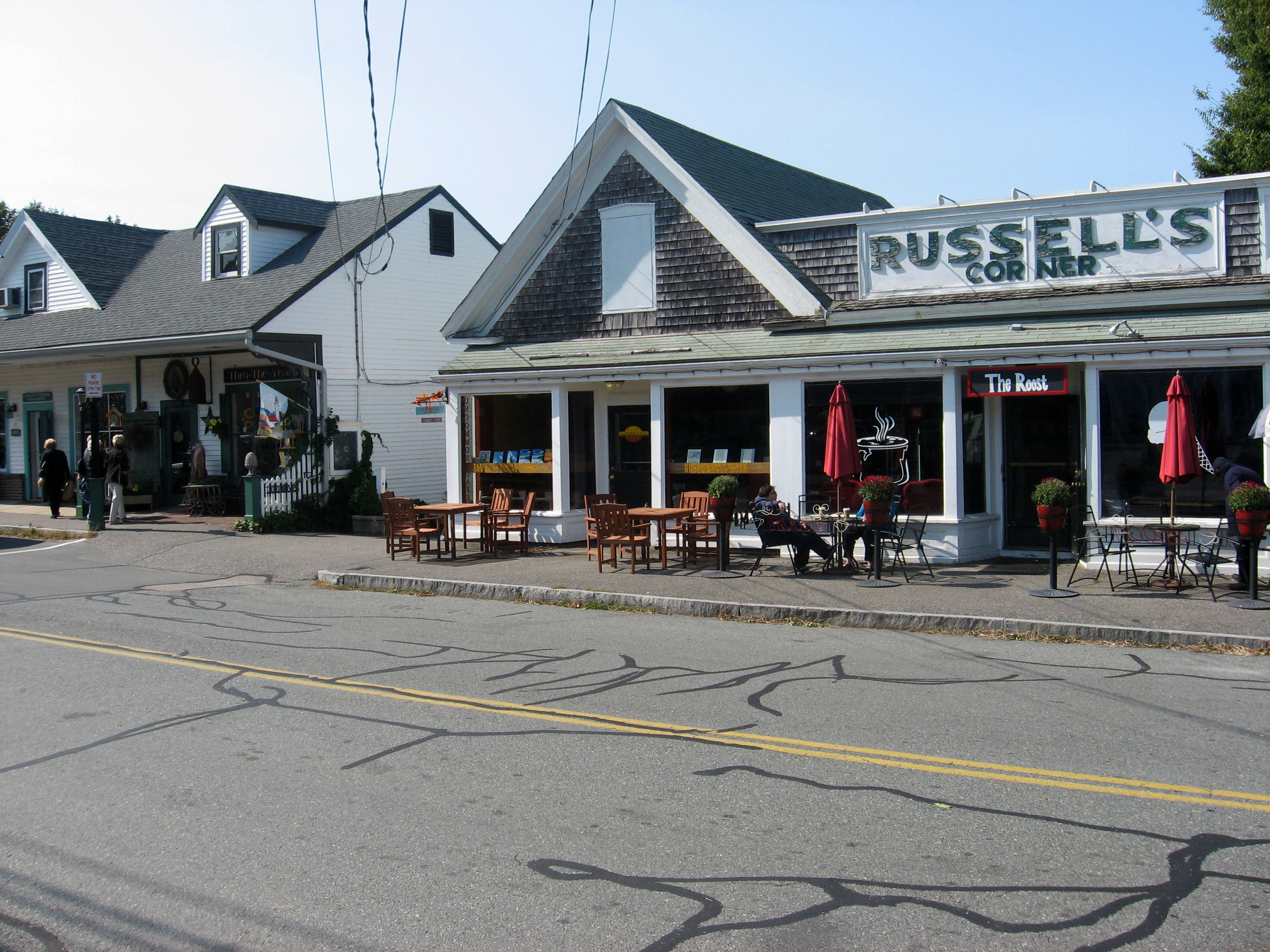

- Location within Cape Cod Location within Massachusetts Location within the United States
- Location: Sandwich, Massachusetts
- Coordinates: 41°45′32″N 70°29′38″W
- Area: 137 acres (55 ha)
- Built: c. 1746
- NRHP reference No.: 10000787
- Added to NRHP: September 23, 2010

The Jarvesville Historic District of Sandwich, Massachusetts is a predominantly residential historic district centered on the site of the former Boston and Sandwich Glass Company factory. It is located north and east of Sandwich Center. Although the area has buildings that date to the middle of the 18th century, most of the district's more than 200 contributing properties are residences built between 1825 and 1860, when the glass company was at its height. These houses are predominantly Cape and Greek Revival in character, and are modest one- and two-family buildings that originally housed glass factory workers.

The glassworks in Jarvesville reached their peak of production and employment around the time of the American Civil War. Business began to decline in the 1860s when cheaper fuel sources in the Midwest prompted the relocation of the businesses. Most attempts to continue glassmaking operations were unsuccessful, and the industrial properties were eventually demolished in the 20th century. The residential properties continued to be occupied, often by descendants of the glassworkers, but also by workers employed in other industrial facilities in the area.

The only significant commercial properties in the district are located on Jarves Street, which is also where the separately-listed John and Mary Waterman Jarves House is located. This 1857 Italianate house was built by Deming Jarves' son, and designed by Charles Kirk Kirby. The only church in the district is the Corpus Christi Roman Catholic Church at 6 Jarves Street; the Romanesque Revival building was constructed in 1901.

The district was listed on the National Register of Historic Places in 2010.

== See also ==
- National Register of Historic Places listings in Barnstable County, Massachusetts
