= Royal Worcester Corset Company =

Clothing company in Worcester, Massachusetts, US

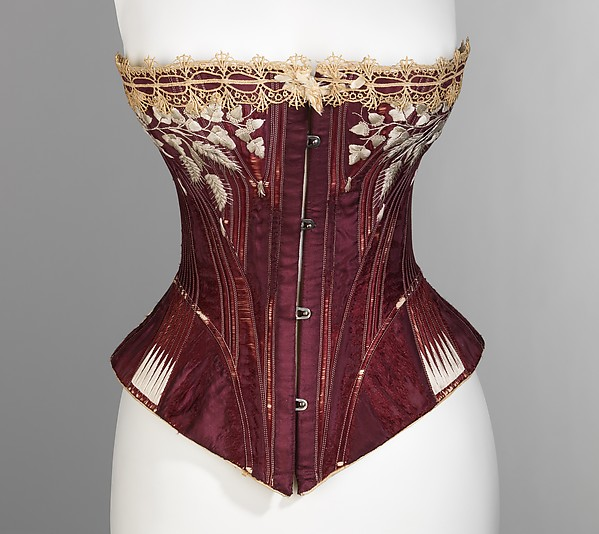
'Bon Ton' Corset - Royal Worcester Corset Company, 1876 - Bon Ton

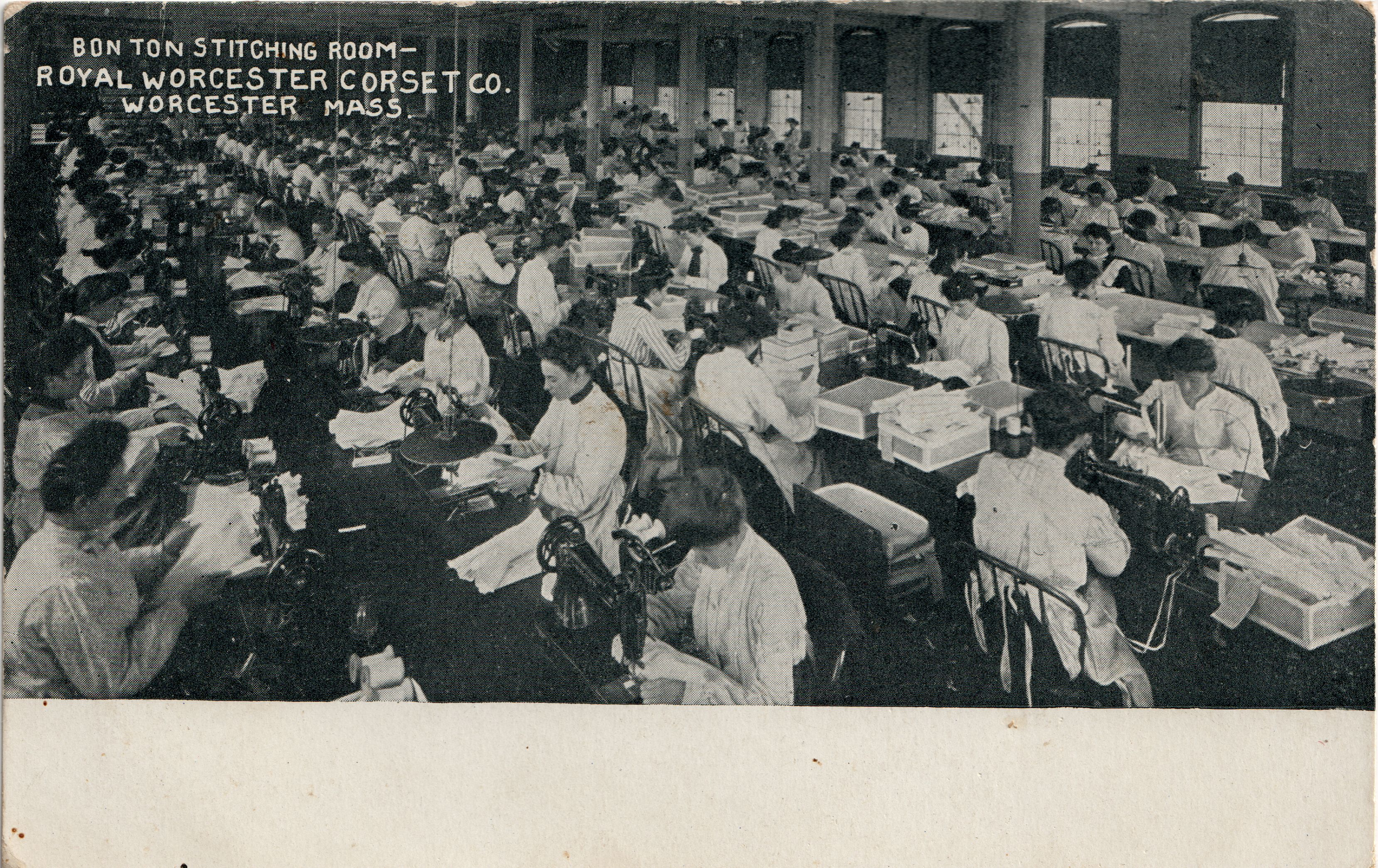
Bonton stitching room -- Royal Worcester Corset Co, Worcester Massachusetts, circa 1910s or 1920s

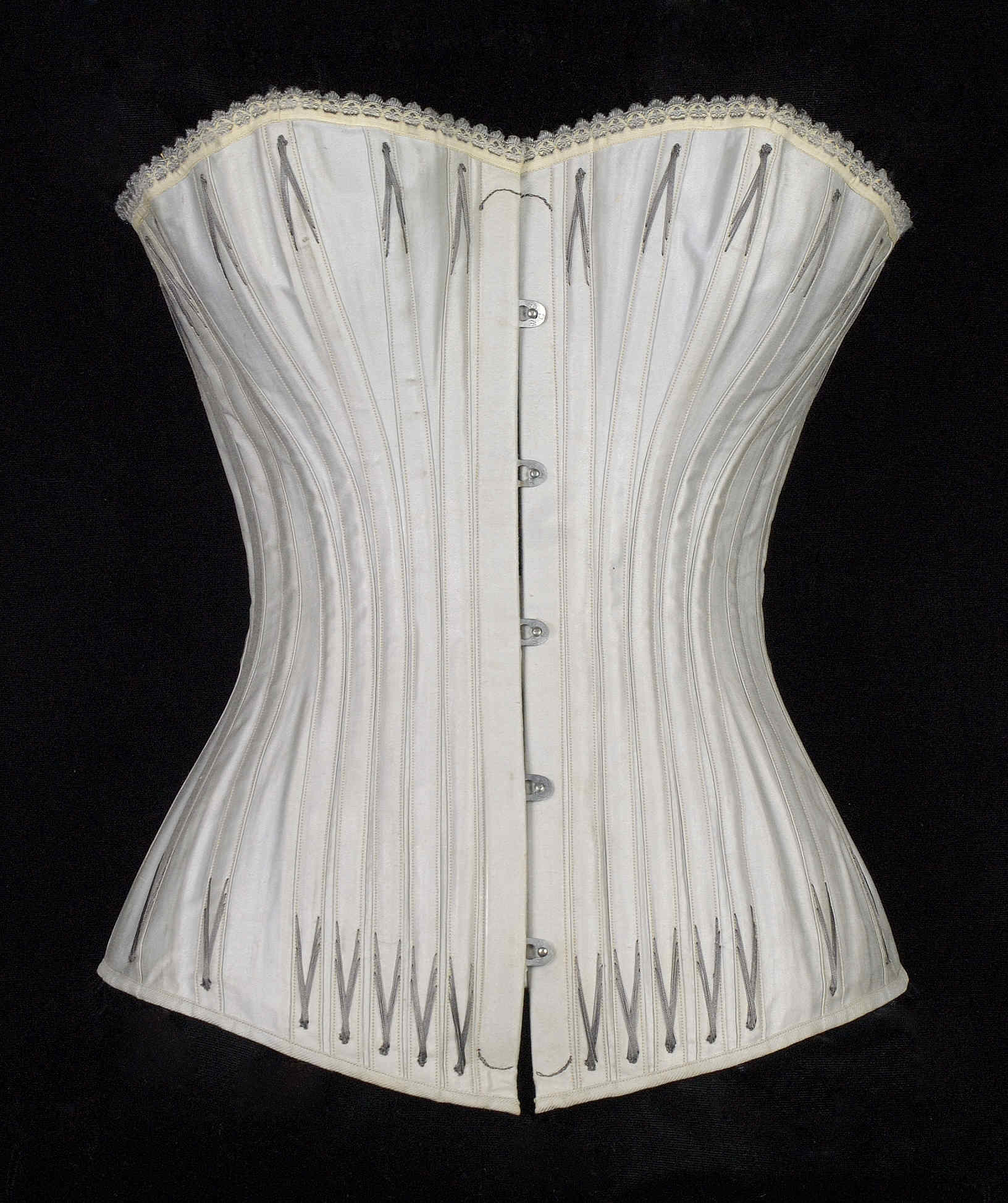
Corset - Royal Worcester Corset Company, ca. 1885

The Royal Worcester Corset Company, was founded as The Worcester Skirt Company by David Hale Fanning in 1861 in Worcester, MA, and first specialized in making hoop skirts. In 1872 the company changed its name to the Worcester Corset Co., to reflect its change of direction from hoop skirts to torso shaping. The company changed its name again in 1901, to the Royal Worcester Corset Company. In 1949 the company dropped the word 'corset' from its name and became known as the Royal Worcester Company, in response to falling interest in corsets. The company had by then switched production away from corsets to girdles.

In 1876, the 'Bon Ton' corset was awarded the bronze medal at the Centennial Exposition in Philadelphia.

The company broke ground on the eponymous The Royal Worcester Corset Company Factory, in 1895, at 30 Wyman St., Worcester, MA. The building was designed by architect Arthur Gray and built by the prominent local firm Norcross Brothers Contractors and Builders.

In 1917 the company had 1500 employees. The Royal Worcester Minstrels were made up of 500 employees who performed at a gala to raise funds for the Royal Worcester Mutual Aid Society.

Founder David Hale Fanning died on Thursday, January 21, 1926, four days after retiring as active head of the company.

In 1950, then-company-president E.A. Meister donated a collection of 171 corsets to the Brooklyn Museum. The collection had been assembled by Isidor Roth, his father-in-law and former president of the company. The stated dual purpose of the donation was to honor Mr. Roth for his outstanding contributions to growth the field of corsetry and to establish a place where the collection could be used as a resource for the history of corsetry. The collection was moved to The Costume Institute at The Metropolitan Museum of Art in 2009 when Brooklyn Museum moved its costume collection in order to reduce expenses.

Contemporary Worcester playwrights Virginia Byrne and Kallin Johnson, of Notre Dame Academy, debuted their fictionalized musical "Royal Worcester Corset Company" in 1993, to commemorate the women who worked at the factory.

== Company Names ==
Years	Name
1861-1872	Worcester Skirt Company
1872-1901	Worcester Corset Company
1901-1949	Royal Worcester Corset Company
1949-1950	Royal Worcester Company
