= Norcross Brothers Houses =

Historic houses in Massachusetts, United States

- U.S. National Register of Historic Places
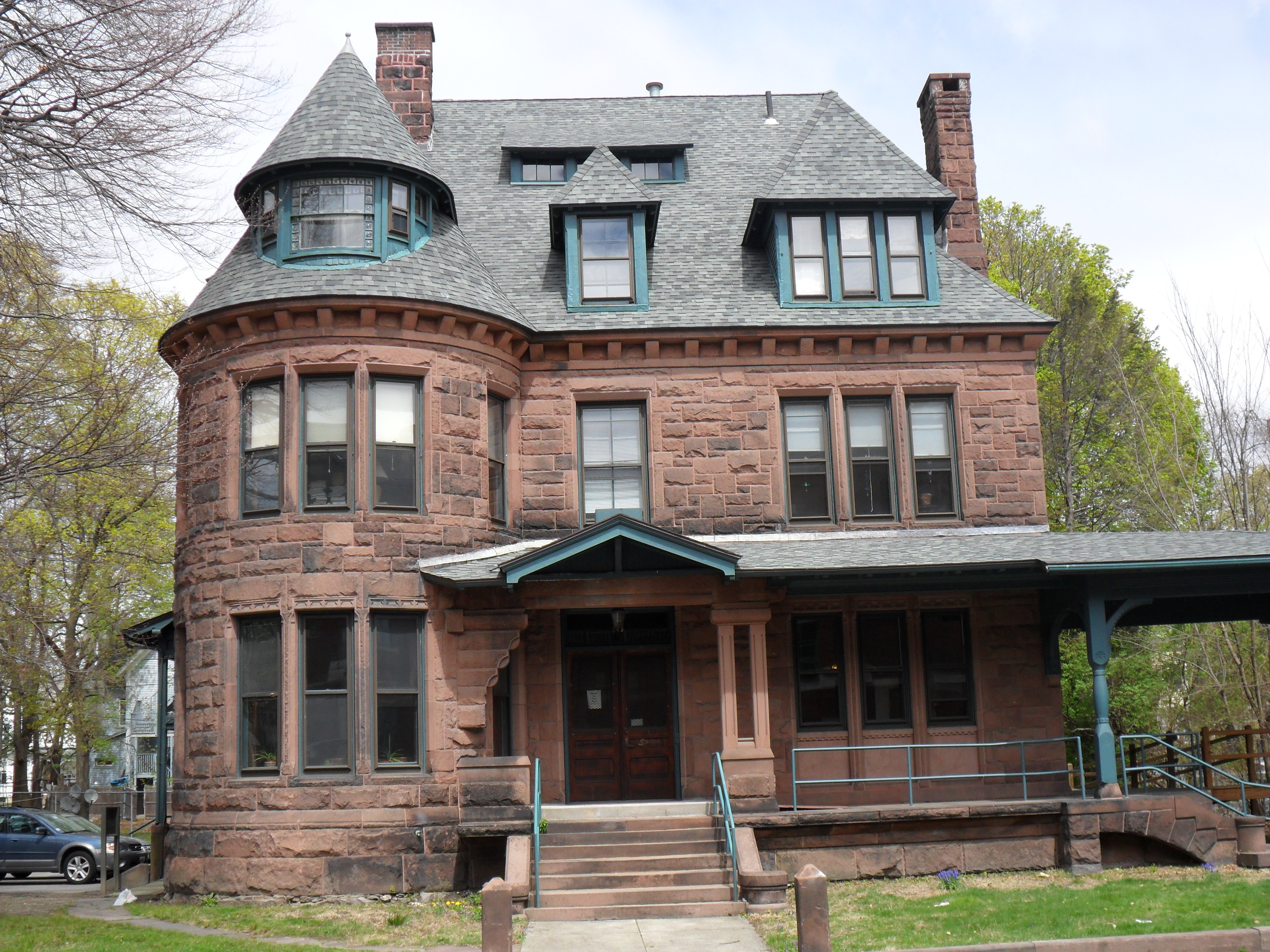
- 16 Claremont Street, otherwise known as the George Perkins Marsh Institute

- Location within Massachusetts Location within the United States
- Location: 16, 18 Claremont St., Worcester, Massachusetts
- Coordinates: 42°15′18″N 71°49′7″W
- Built: 1878
- Architectural style: Queen Anne
- MPS: Worcester MRA
- NRHP reference No.: 80000624
- Added to NRHP: March 5, 1980

The Norcross Brothers Houses are historic houses at 16 and 18 Claremont Street in Worcester, Massachusetts. They are named after their builders and first occupants, James and Orlando Norcross, principals of the Norcross Brothers construction company.

== History ==
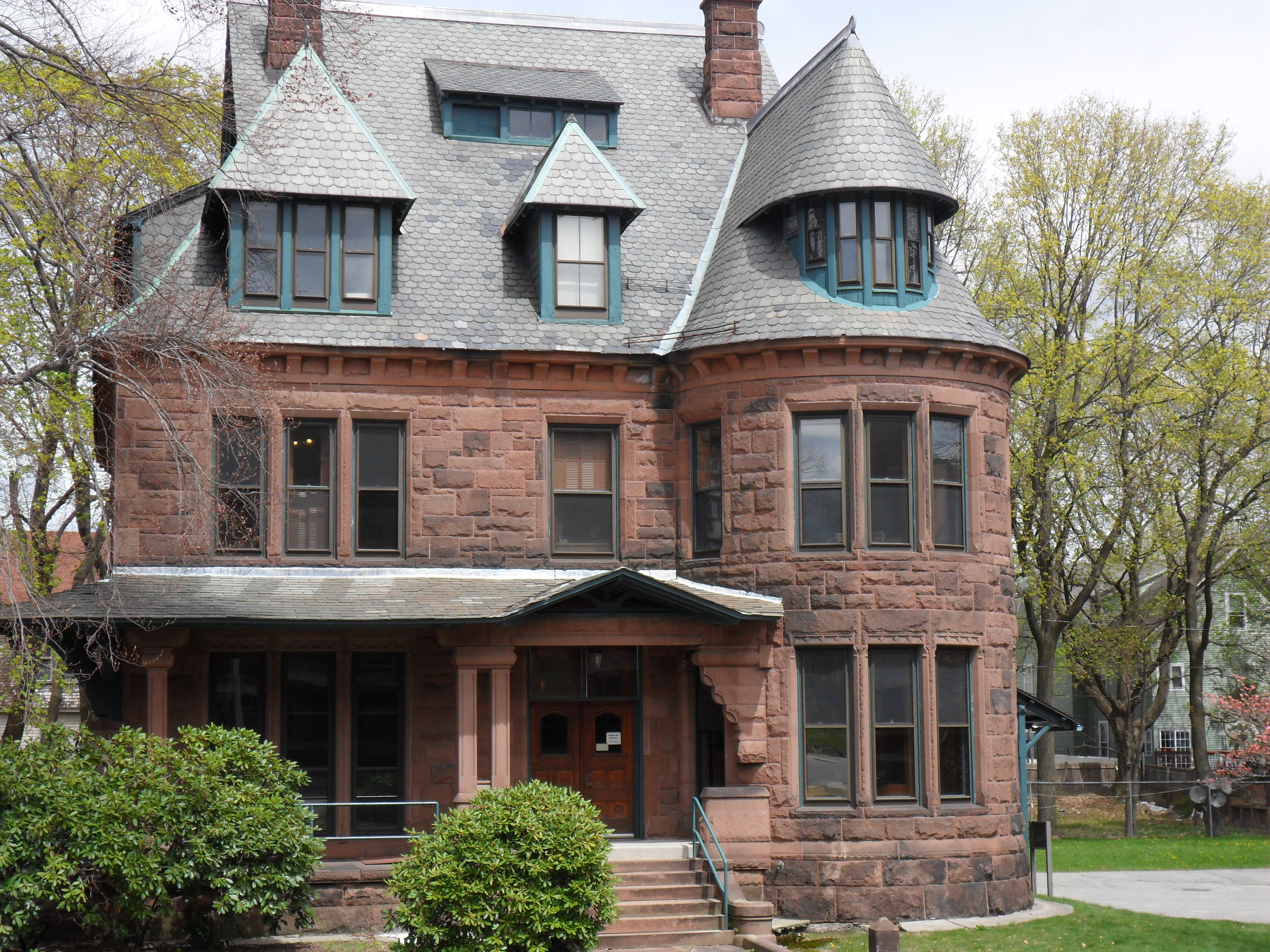
18 Claremont Street, otherwise known as the Jeanne X. Kasperson Library of Clark University

The houses, which are located on the corner of Claremont Street and Woodland Street in the Main South area of Worcester, have been regarded as some of the earliest and finest examples of Queen Anne architecture in the city. They were built in 1878 and added to the National Register of Historic Places in 1980. 16 Claremont Street is home to the George Perkins Marsh Institute of Clark University. The Marsh Institute studies the human dimensions of environmental change and coupled natural and human systems.

The two homes are nearly identical in design, featuring rock-faced sandstone exteriors and asymmetrical facades. They are richly ornamented with wood paneling and unique interior details, with slight differences between the two houses. Over the years, the homes went through various modifications as they served different purposes, including a nursing home, convent, commune, dormitory, and more. Efforts have been made to restore some of the original spaces, but changes made by previous occupants and academic program requirements have been accommodated.

== See also ==
- National Register of Historic Places listings in southwestern Worcester, Massachusetts
- National Register of Historic Places listings in Worcester County, Massachusetts
