= Cambridge Street Firehouse =

- U.S. National Register of Historic Places
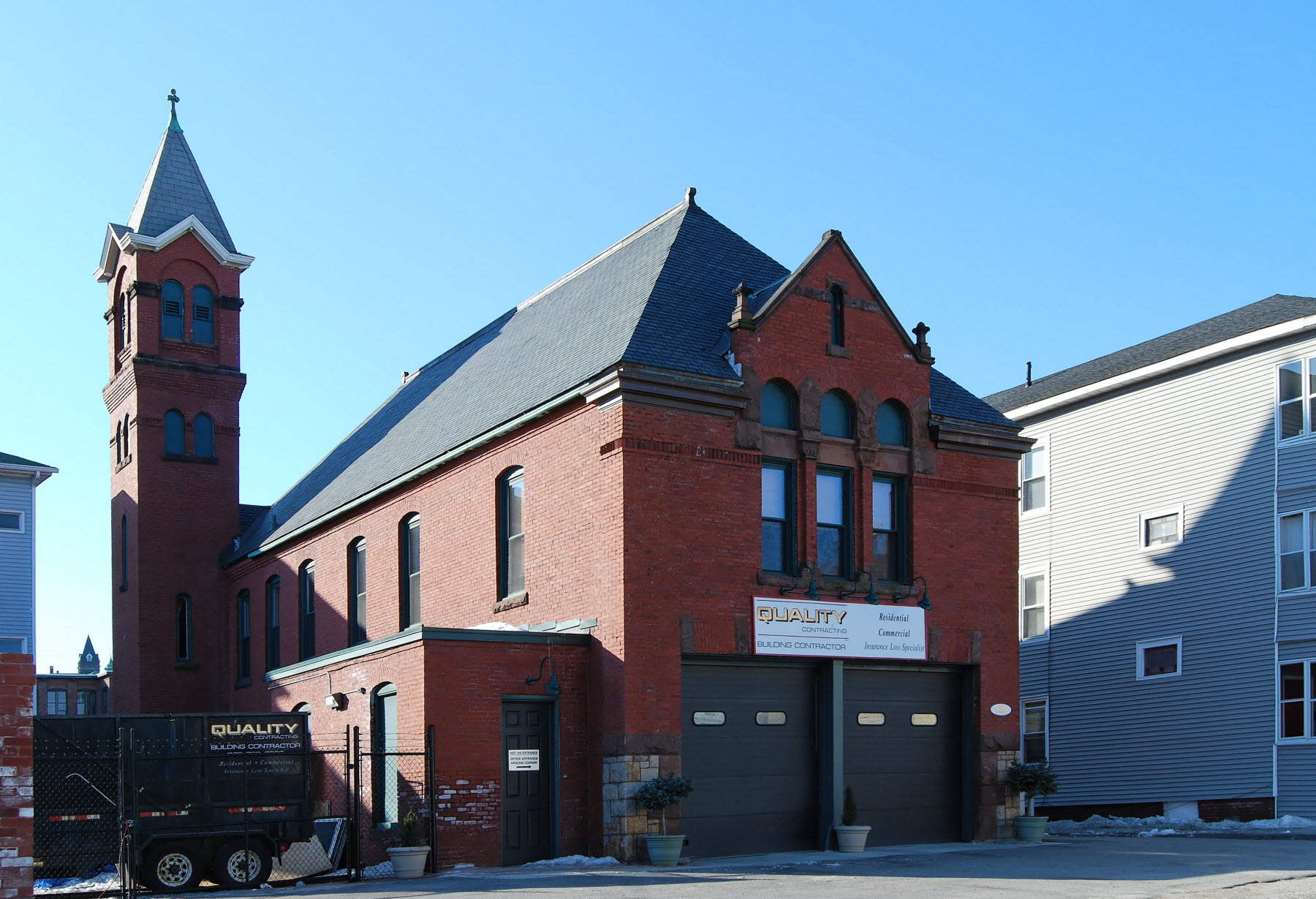

- Location within Massachusetts Location within the United States
- Location: 534 Cambridge St., Worcester, Massachusetts
- Coordinates: 42°14′38.8″N 71°48′32.2″W
- Built: 1886
- Architect: Fuller & Delano
- Architectural style: Queen Anne
- MPS: Worcester MRA
- NRHP reference No.: 80000487
- Added to NRHP: March 05, 1980

The Cambridge Street Firehouse is a historic fire station at 534 Cambridge Street in Worcester, Massachusetts. The two story brick building was built in 1886 in a Queen Anne style, with some Romanesque details. It is nearly identical to Worcester's Woodland Street Firehouse; both were designed by Fuller & Delano and built the same year.

The building was listed on the National Register of Historic Places in 1980, at which time it was still an active firehouse. Engine 14 and Ladder 9 ran out of this station over the years. Engine 14 was eliminated in 1991, Ladder 9 in the 1960s.

== See also ==
- National Register of Historic Places listings in southwestern Worcester, Massachusetts
- National Register of Historic Places listings in Worcester County, Massachusetts
