= Baystate Corset Block =

- U.S. National Register of Historic Places
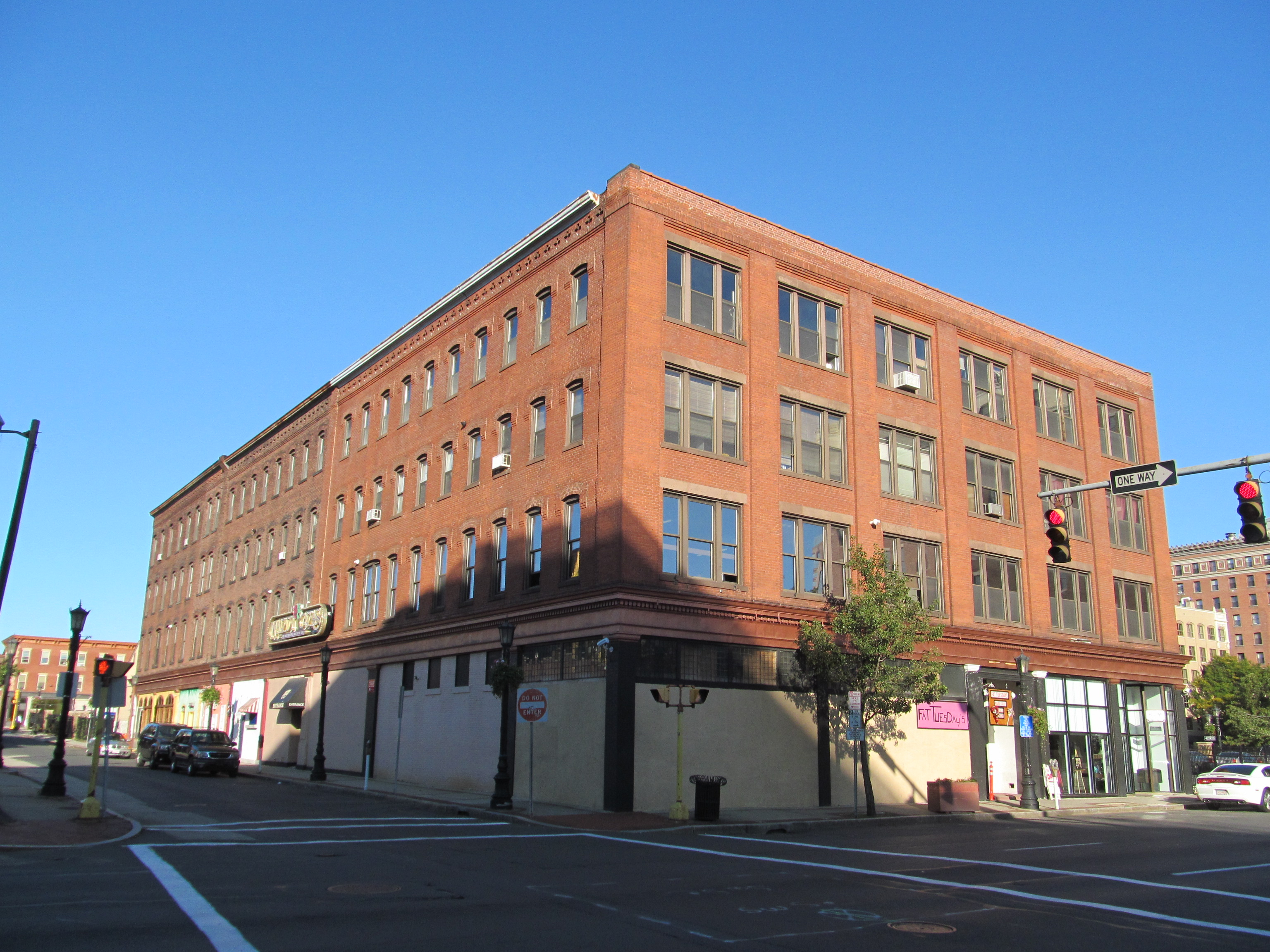
- Baystate Corset Block

- Location within Massachusetts Location within the United States
- Location: 395-405 Dwight St., 99 Taylor St., Springfield, Massachusetts
- Coordinates: 42°6′21″N 72°35′31″W
- Area: less than one acre
- Built: 1874
- Architect: Robinson Marsh & Co.
- MPS: Downtown Springfield MRA
- NRHP reference No.: 83000737
- Added to NRHP: February 24, 1983

The Baystate Corset Block is a historic commercial block at 395–405 Dwight St. and 99 Taylor Street in Springfield, Massachusetts, United States. Built in 1874 and twice enlarged, it was from 1888 to 1920 home of the Baystate Corset Company, one of the nation's largest manufacturers of corsets. The building was listed on the National Register of Historic Places in 1983.

== Description and history ==
The Baystate Corset Block stands on the north side of Springfield's downtown area, at the northeast corner of Dwight and Taylor Streets. The main portion of the building, facing Dwight Street, was built in 1874 by Marsh & Robinson. It is a four-story brick structure, whose original styling, visible on the side elevation, includes segmental arch windows and a corbelled cornice. The front facade, which was redone in 1918, consists on the upper level of five bays of tripled windows, separated by brick piers. The storefronts are largely unaltered.

The first tenants of the building were woodworking shops, who occupied it until 1883, when it was occupied by a paper products business. P. P. Kellogg, its owner, expanded the premises, building an extension along Taylor Street in 1888. In 1886, the Baystate Corset Company, founded two years earlier in West Brookfield, Massachusetts, leased space in the building. Baystate grew rapidly, and purchased the building in 1895, occupying it until 1920. It was one of the nation's largest corset manufacturers at the time, shipping products all across the country. Baystate used the top floor of the building as a cutting room, with the second and third floors arrayed with sewing machines at which its products were manufactured.

== See also ==
- Kraus Corset Factory, NRHP-listed in Derby, Connecticut
- Strouse, Adler Company Corset Factory, NRHP-listed in New Haven, Connecticut
- Worcester Corset Company Factory, NRHP-listed in Worcester, Massachusetts
- National Register of Historic Places listings in Springfield, Massachusetts
