= Kraus Corset Factory =

- U.S. National Register of Historic Places
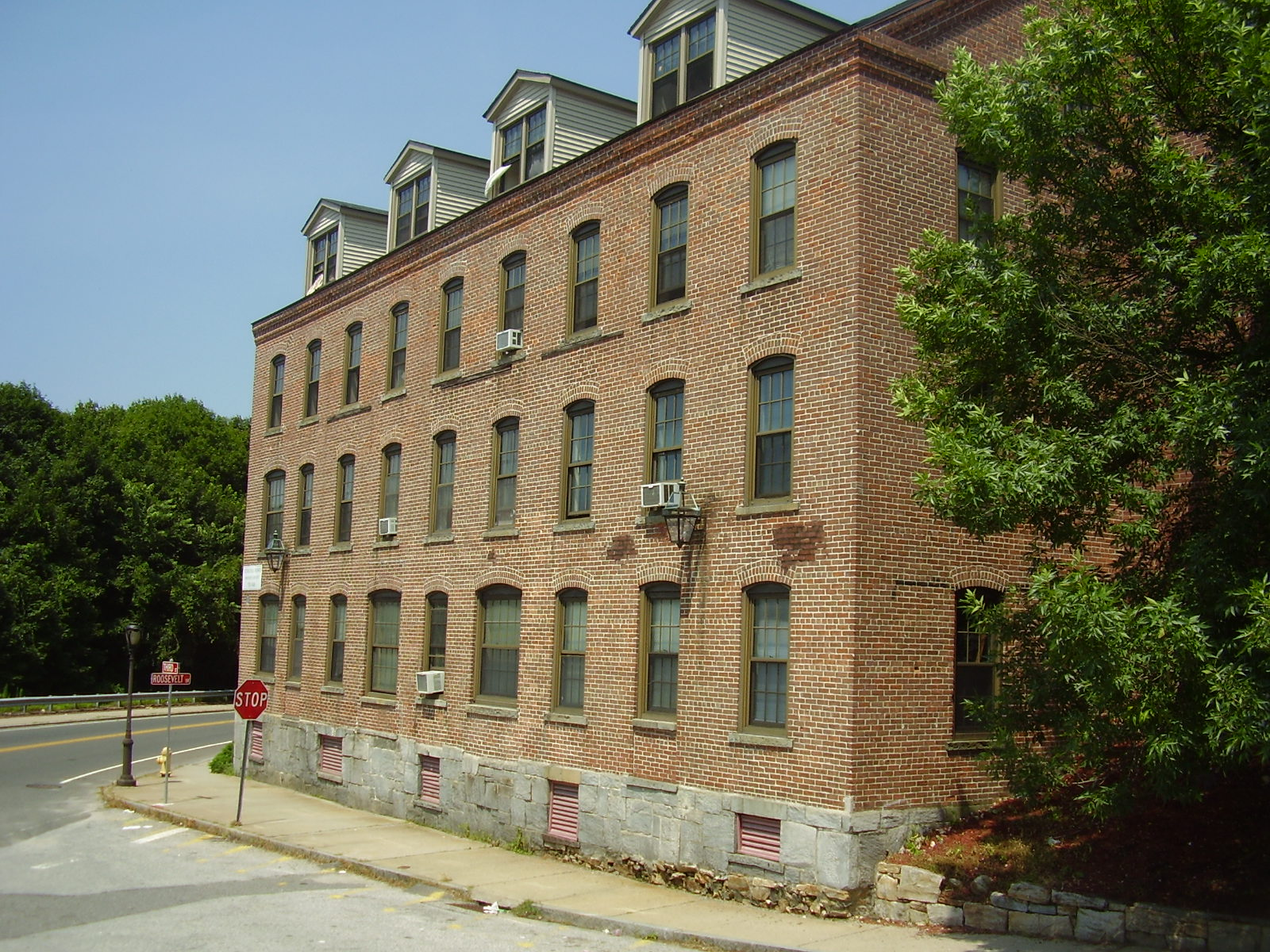
- Kraus Corset Factory in 2008

- Location within Connecticut Location within the United States
- Location: 33 Roosevelt Drive CT 34 Derby, Connecticut
- Coordinates: 41°19′13″N 73°5′29″W
- Area: 0.5 acres (0.20 ha)
- Built: 1879
- NRHP reference No.: 87000128
- Added to NRHP: February 12, 1987

The Kraus Corset Factory is a historic industrial property at 33 Roosevelt Drive CT 34 in Derby, Connecticut, United States. The oldest portion of the large brick building, built in 1879, faces Third Street, while a c. 1910 addition extends along Roosevelt Drive CT 34. It is the only major building to survive from Derby's period of corset manufacturing. It was built by Sidney Downs, one of Derby's leading businessmen of the period. The building was listed on the National Register of Historic Places on February 12, 1987. It has been converted into apartments.

== Description and history ==
The Kraus Corset Factory is located adjacent to Downtown Derby, extending mainly along Roosevelt Drive (CT 34) Northwest of Third Street. The factory is composed of two structures, the main 1879 block, and the c. 1910 addition. The main block is built of brick and is three stories in height, with nine bays facing Third Street and ten facing Roosevelt. The windows are set in segmented-arch openings, with stone sills. Shed-roof dormers project from the roof faces. The addition is a wood-frame structure, also three stories in height, but with a fully-exposed basement level facing the street.

The factory's main block was built in 1879 by Sidney Downs, a prominent local businessman who had previously engaged in other corset-making partnerships. He leased this factory to Leopold Kraus whose firm employed about a quarter of Derby's corsetmakers. This business was only successful into the early 1890s, and had been swallowed by competition by 1896. The site next housed businesses engaged in a variety of metalworking pursuits related to corsetry, and in 1907 it was acquired by Sterling Pin. Pinmaking was another major business in Derby, and Sterling expanded the plant to manufacture pins, hairpins, clasps and eyes, and other small wire-based products. It remained in business at this site into the 1970s.

== See also ==
- Baystate Corset Block, NRHP-listed in Springfield, Massachusetts
- Strouse, Adler Company Corset Factory, NRHP-listed in New Haven, Connecticut
- Worcester Corset Company Factory, NRHP-listed in Worcester, Massachusetts
- National Register of Historic Places listings in New Haven County, Connecticut
