= Woodland Street Firehouse =

- U.S. National Register of Historic Places
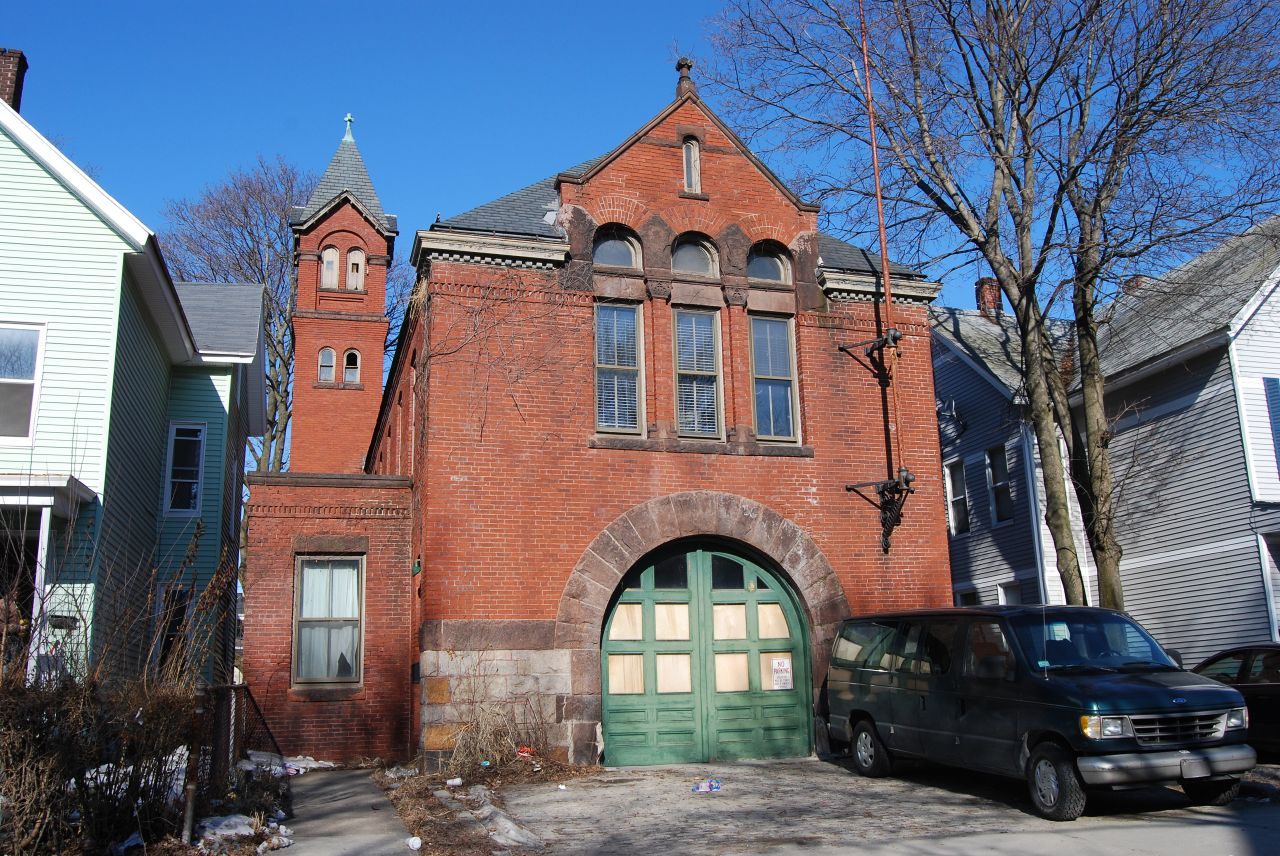

- Location within Massachusetts Location within the United States
- Location: 36 Woodland St., Worcester, Massachusetts
- Coordinates: 42°15′26″N 71°49′5″W
- Built: 1886
- Architect: Fuller & Delano
- Architectural style: Queen Anne, Romanesque
- MPS: Worcester MRA
- NRHP reference No.: 80000630
- Added to NRHP: March 05, 1980

The Woodland Street Firehouse is an historic fire station at 36 Woodland Street in Worcester, Massachusetts. It is one of the finest of Worcester Victorian-era firehouses. The two story brick building was built in 1886 in a Queen Anne style, with some Romanesque details. It is nearly identical to Worcester's Cambridge Street Firehouse; both were designed by Fuller & Delano and built the same year.

The building was listed on the National Register of Historic Places in 1980. It is no longer used as a firehouse. Engine 10 ran out of this station until 1979 when it moved to Park Ave until the company was eliminated in 2009.

== See also ==
- Woodland Street Historic District
- National Register of Historic Places listings in southwestern Worcester, Massachusetts
- National Register of Historic Places listings in Worcester County, Massachusetts
