= Daniel Hunt Three-Decker =

- U.S. National Register of Historic Places
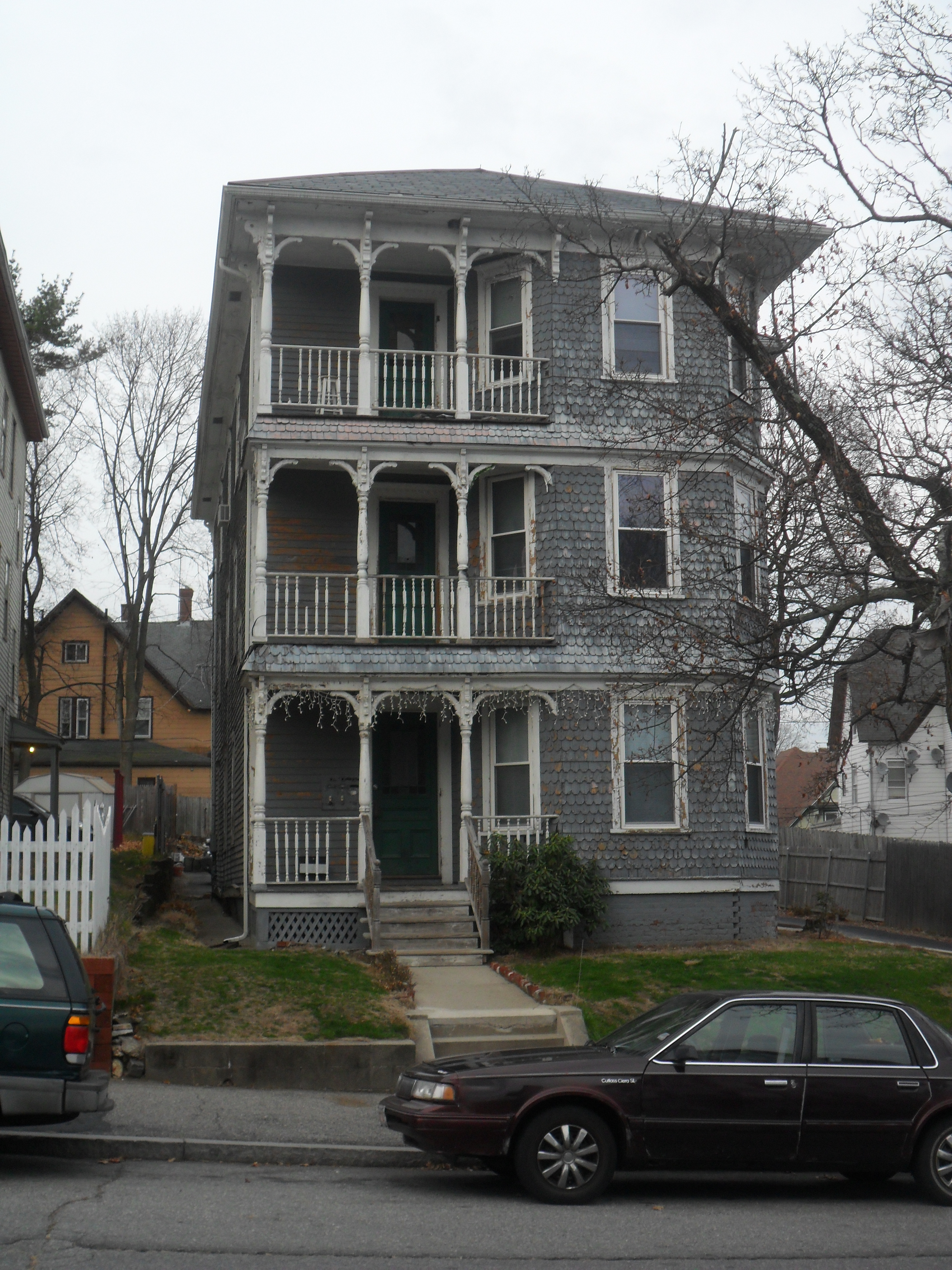

- Location within Massachusetts Location within the United States
- Location: 9 Wyman St., Worcester, Massachusetts
- Coordinates: 42°15′2″N 71°49′14″W
- Built: 1890
- Architectural style: Queen Anne
- MPS: Worcester Three-Deckers TR
- NRHP reference No.: 89002451
- Added to NRHP: February 9, 1990

The Daniel Hunt Three-Decker is a historic triple decker house in the Main South neighborhood of Worcester, Massachusetts. It is a well preserved representative of the housing boom that took place in the area in the 1880s and 1890s, with significant early Queen Anne styling. It was built in 1890, and its first owner was Daniel Hunt, a machinist who lived next door. The building follows a typical side hall plan, with a side wall jog and an asymmetrical facade. The left side is a row of porches with turned balusters and posts, and the right consists of a bay that projects the full depth of the porch. The roof is a shallow hip roof, with an extended eave that has curved support brackets.

The building was listed on the National Register of Historic Places in 1990.

== See also ==
- National Register of Historic Places listings in southwestern Worcester, Massachusetts
- National Register of Historic Places listings in Worcester County, Massachusetts
