= John and Mary Waterman Jarves House =

Historic house in Massachusetts, United States

- U.S. National Register of Historic Places
- U.S. Historic district – Contributing property
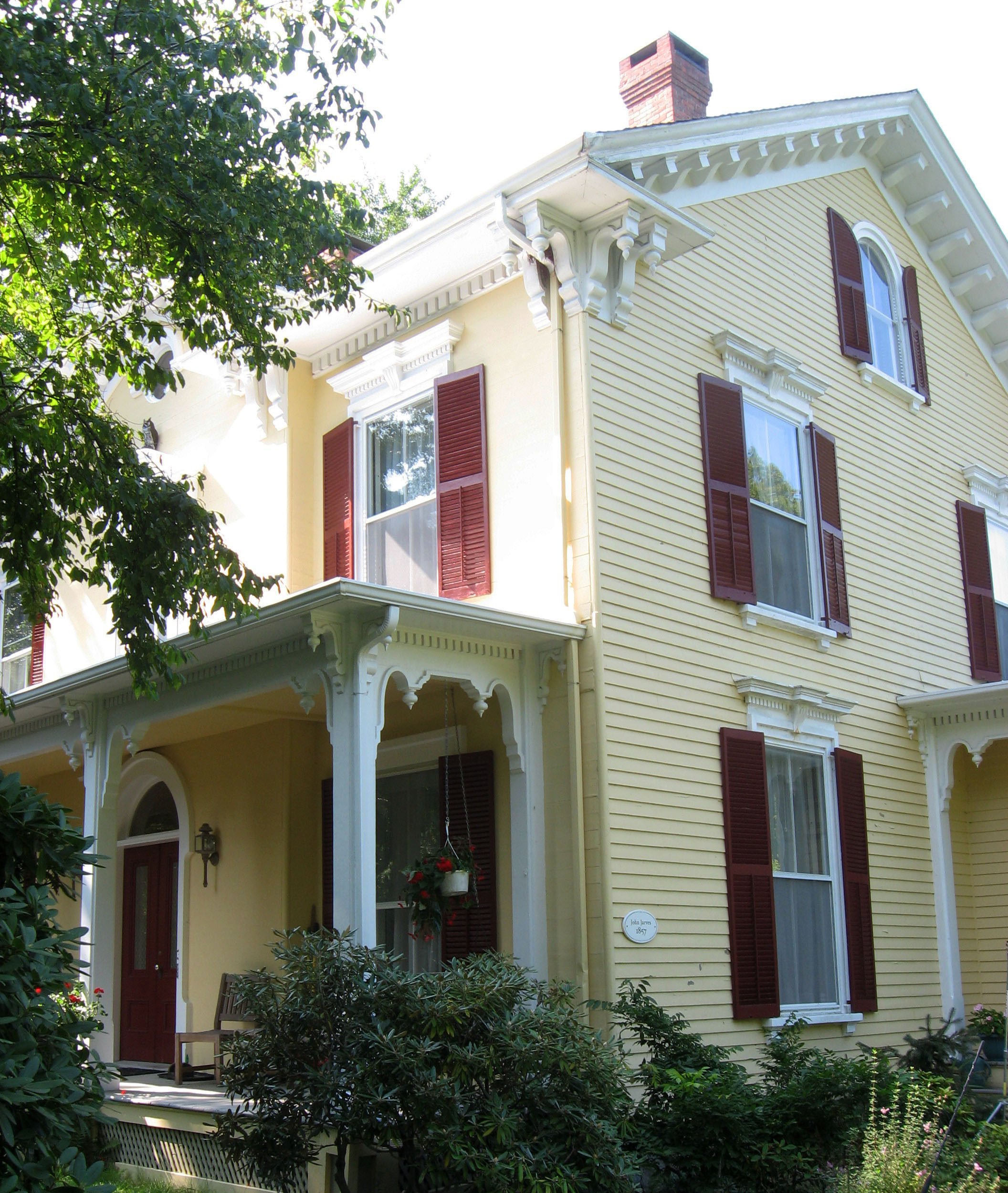
- The house in 2013

- Location within Cape Cod Location within Massachusetts Location within the United States
- Location: Sandwich, Massachusetts
- Coordinates: 41°45′30″N 70°29′46″W
- Built: 1857
- Architect: Kirby, Charles Kirk
- Architectural style: Italianate
- Part of: Jarvesville Historic District (ID10000787)
- NRHP reference No.: 02000903

Significant dates
- Added to NRHP: August 30, 2002
- Designated CP: September 23, 2010

The John and Mary Waterman Jarves House is a historic house at 3 Jarves Street in Sandwich, Massachusetts. The 2 1/2-story Italianate wood-frame house was designed and built by Charles Kirk Kirby in 1857. It was built for John Jarves, founder of the Cape Cod Glass Works, one of the major business in 19th century Sandwich. He was the son of Deming Jarves, founder of the Boston and Sandwich Glass Company.

The house was added to the National Register of Historic Places in 2002, and included in the Jarvesville Historic District in 2010.

== See also ==
- National Register of Historic Places listings in Barnstable County, Massachusetts
