= Lawrence Model Lodging Houses =

- U.S. National Register of Historic Places
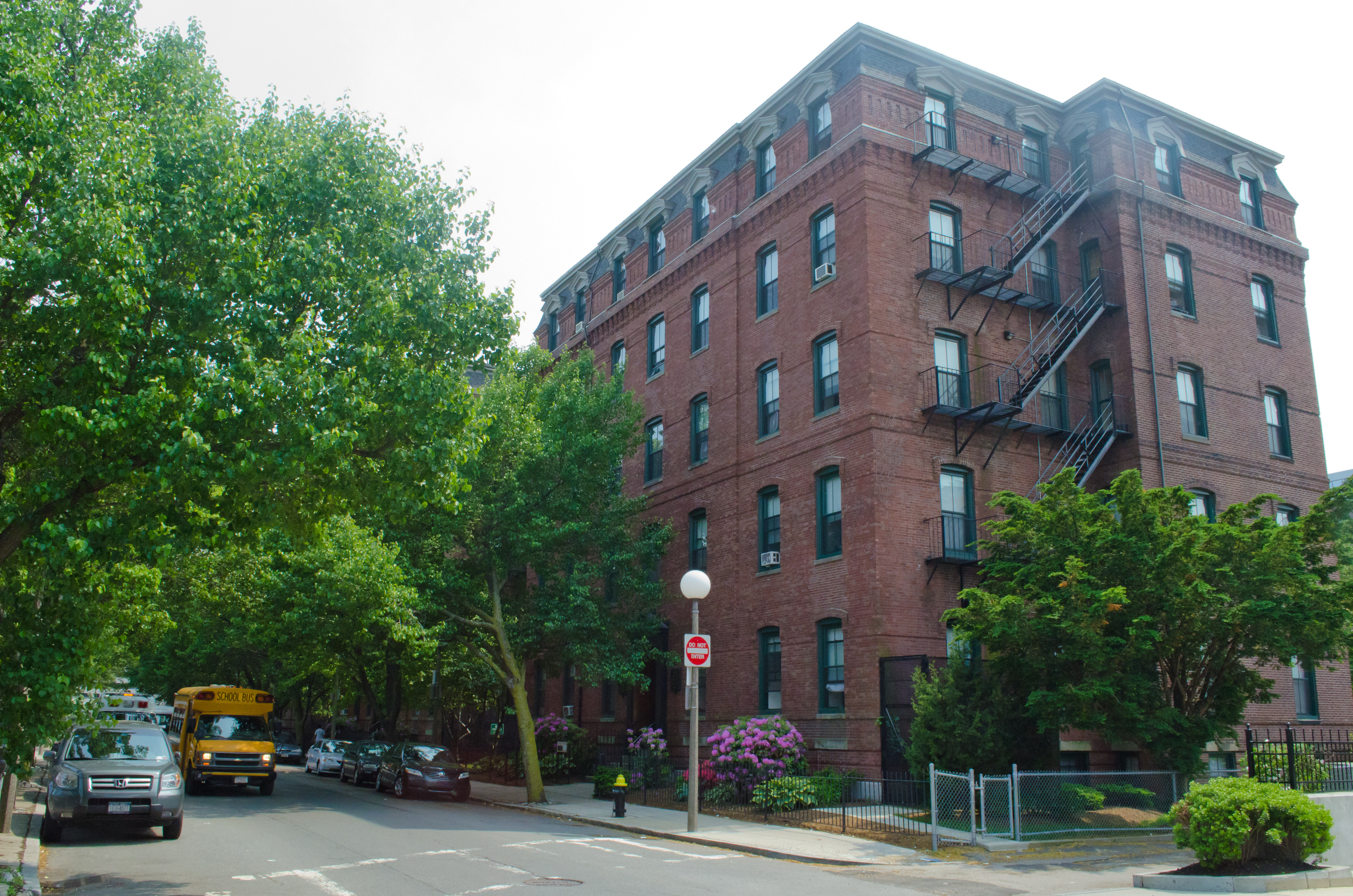
- 109 E. Canton Street

- Location within Massachusetts Location within the United States
- Location: Boston, Massachusetts
- Coordinates: 42°20′17″N 71°4′14″W
- Built: 1874
- Architect: Charles K. Kirby, William F. Goodwin
- NRHP reference No.: 83000606
- Added to NRHP: September 22, 1983

The Lawrence Model Lodging Houses are historic apartment houses located at 79, 89, 99 and 109 East Canton Street in the South End of Boston, Massachusetts. Built in 1874, these 4 1/2-story brick buildings were designed by Boston architects, Charles K. Kirby and William F. Goodwin. Three of the four have a traditional Second Empire mansard roof, while the fourth has a brick-faced attic level. They were built with funds from industrialist and financier Abbott Lawrence, who left a $50,000 bequest to provide housing for the poor.

On September 22, 1983, they were added to the National Register of Historic Places.

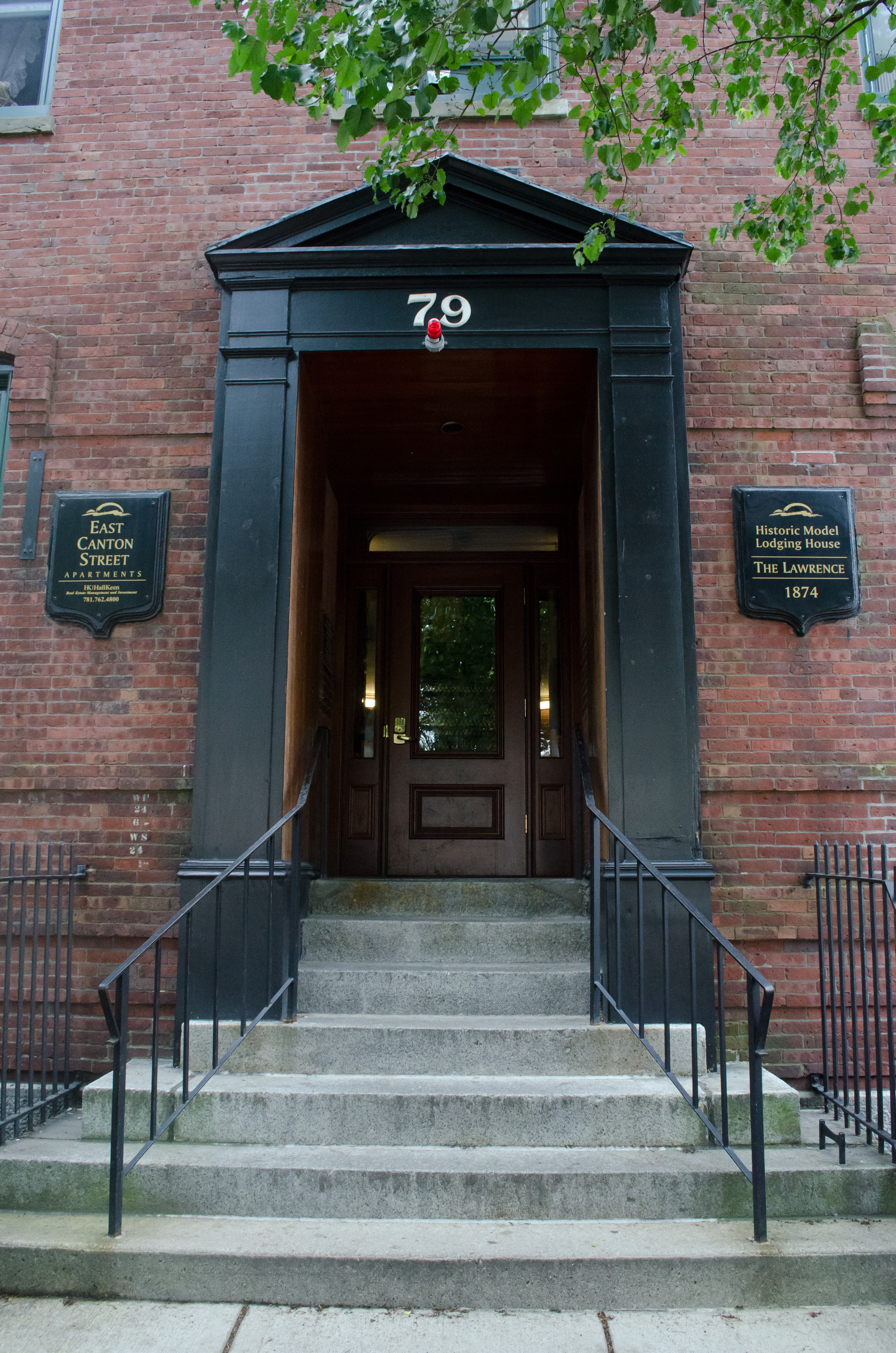
No. 79, The Lawrence

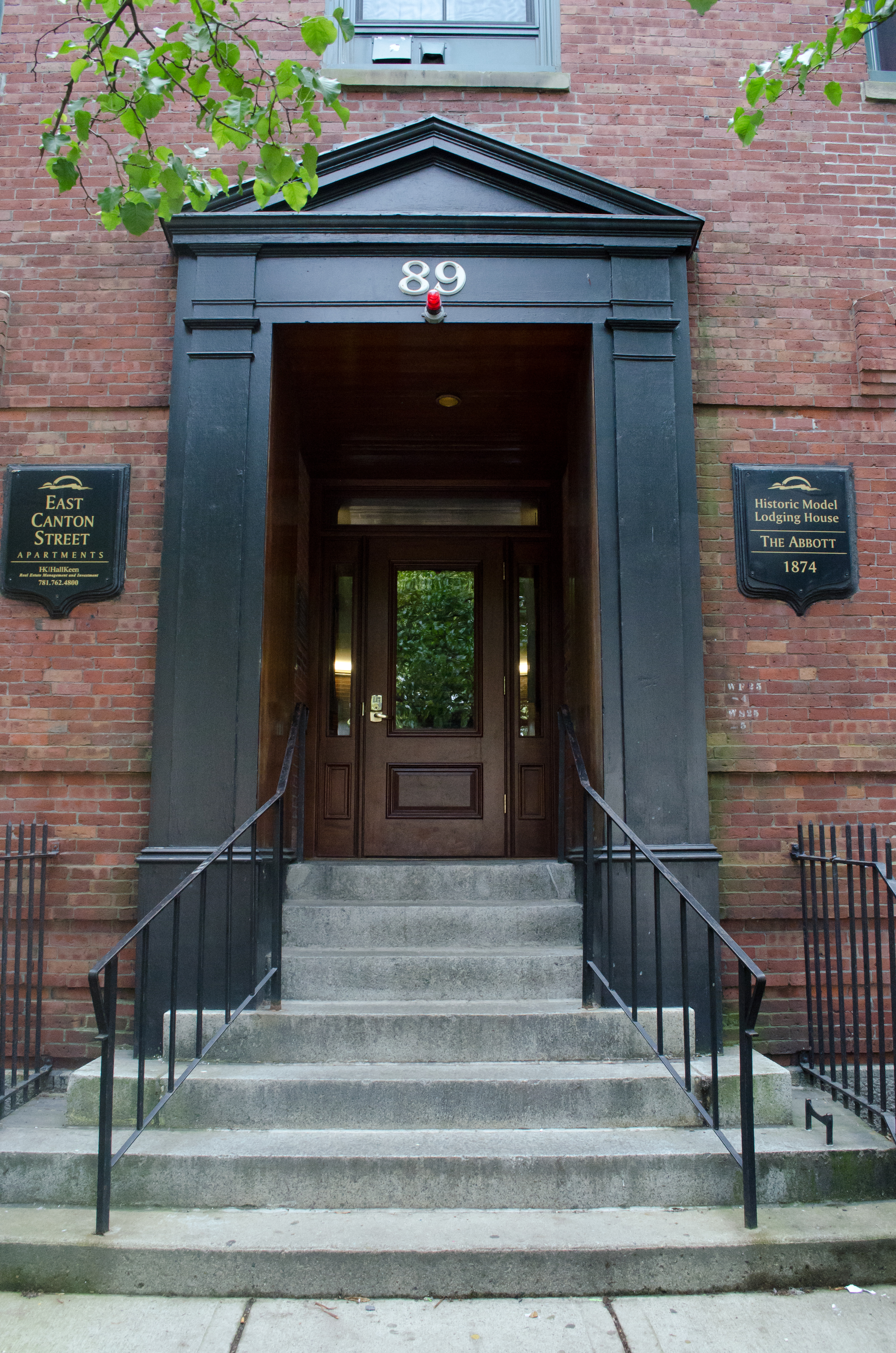
No. 89, The Abbott

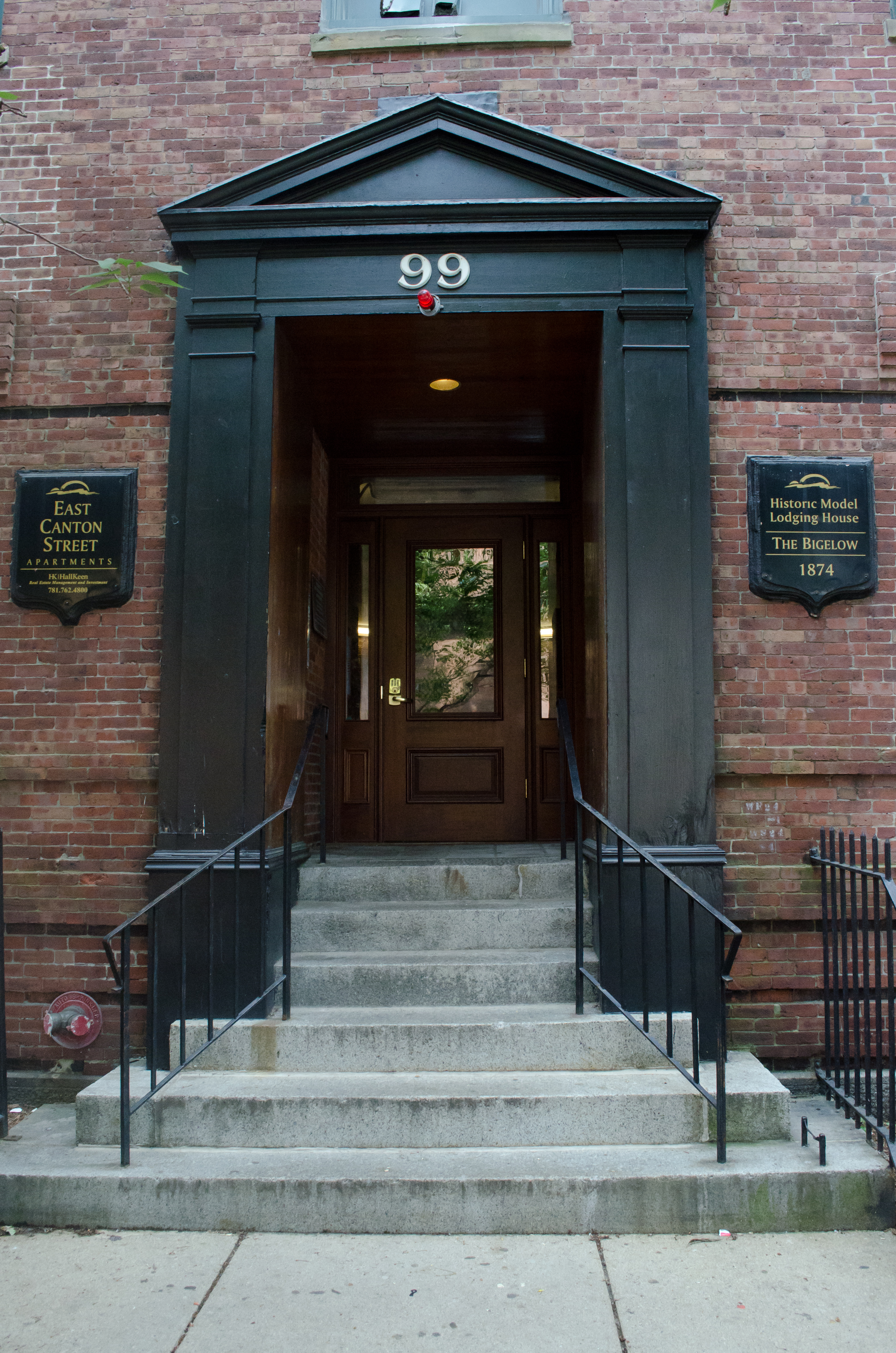
No. 99, The Bigelow

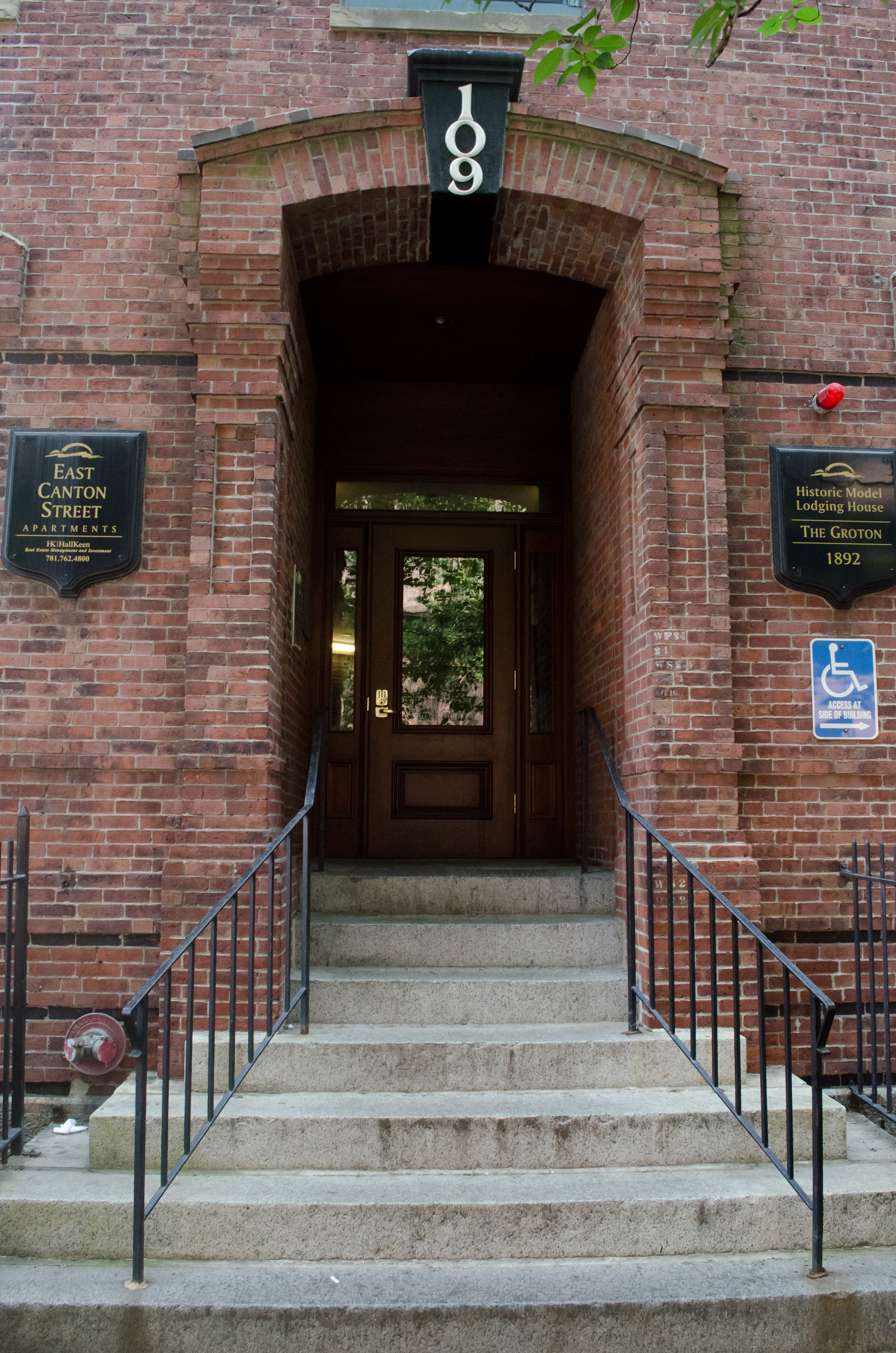
No. 109, The Groton

== See also ==
- National Register of Historic Places listings in southern Boston, Massachusetts
