= Strouse, Adler Company Corset Factory =

- U.S. National Register of Historic Places
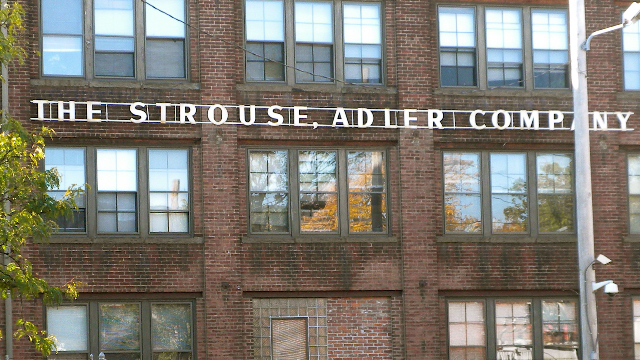

- Location within Connecticut Location within the United States
- Location: 78-84 Olive Street, New Haven, Connecticut
- Coordinates: 41°18′20″N 72°55′11″W
- Area: 2.5 acres (1.0 ha)
- Built: 1876
- Architectural style: Italianate, Classical Revival
- NRHP reference No.: 02000864
- Added to NRHP: August 22, 2002

The Strouse, Adler Company Corset Factory is a historic factory complex at 78-84 Olive Street in New Haven, Connecticut. Developed between 1876 and 1923, it was the largest and oldest of the city's several corset manufacturers, and remained in continuous operation for that purpose until 1998. The complex was listed on the National Register of Historic Places in 2002. It has since been converted into residential use.

== Description and history ==
The former Strouse, Adler factory is located east of downtown New Haven, at the corner of Olive and Court Streets in the city's industrial Wooster Square district. The factory consists of a large number of interconnected brick buildings, ranging in height from one to four stories. The oldest buildings in the complex have Italianate styling typical of mill construction of the 1860s and 1870s, while expansions in the early 20th century exhibit more neo-Classical styling. The overall form is one of a rectangle with several outward projections at the corners, and a central courtyard that has partial infill construction.

The business that became Strouse, Adler was founded in 1861 as J.H. Smith and Company, and was the nation's first manufacturer of corsets. The business was purchased the following year by Isaac Strouse, who took on Max Adler, a local dry goods retailer, as a partner. The company adopted the name Strouse, Adler in 1899 and was incorporated in 1927. The company experienced rapid growth in its early years, moving several times before moving into the older portions of this complex in 1876. It had previously been occupied by the Winchester Shirt Company. The company was in the vanguard of the rise in the popularity of corsets, as well as the rise of New Haven as nation's largest producer of the garment by the 1890s. The company remained financially successful through most of the 20th century, despite a decline in popularity of corsets, by introducing lighter-weight fabrics and materials, and manufacturing other types of foundation garments. It was acquired in 1998 by Sara Lee, and this plant was shuttered.

== See also ==
- Baystate Corset Block, NRHP-listed in Springfield, Massachusetts
- Kraus Corset Factory, NRHP-listed in Derby, Connecticut
- Worcester Corset Company Factory, NRHP-listed in Worcester, Massachusetts
- National Register of Historic Places listings in New Haven, Connecticut

== Gallery ==
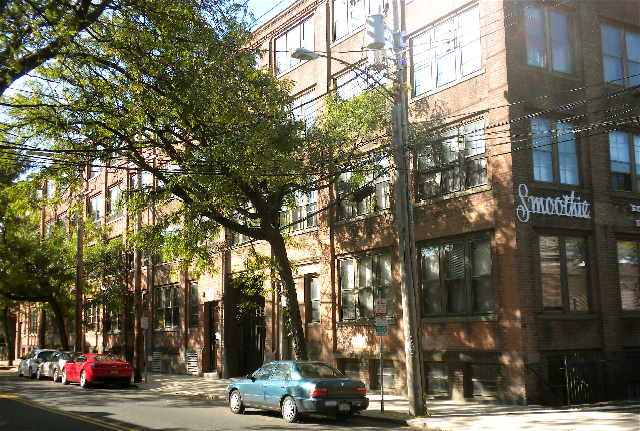
Strouse, Adler factory front, Olive St.

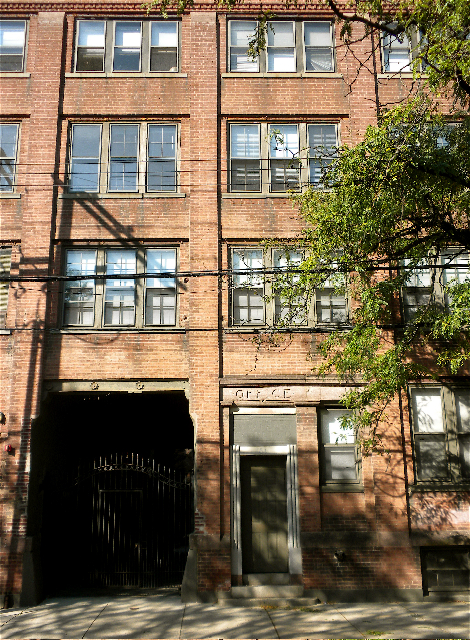
Strouse, Adler factory gate and office, Olive St.

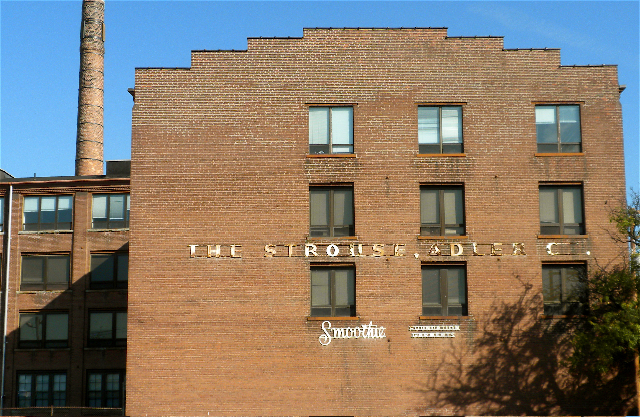
Strouse, Adler Company.

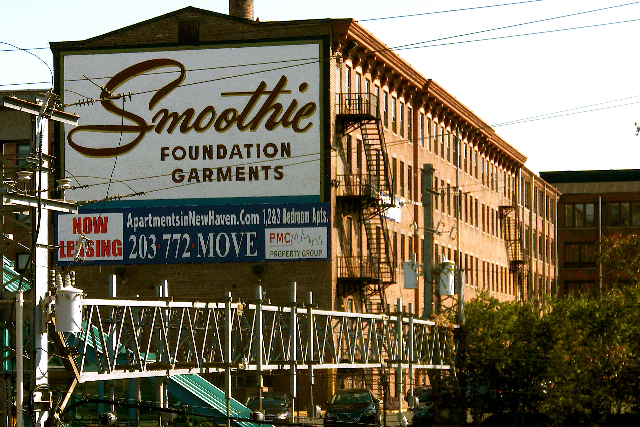
Strouse, Adler factory with advertising for the Smoothie Foundational Garments made there.
