= Al Mac's Diner-Restaurant =

- Al Mac's Diner--Restaurant
- U.S. National Register of Historic Places
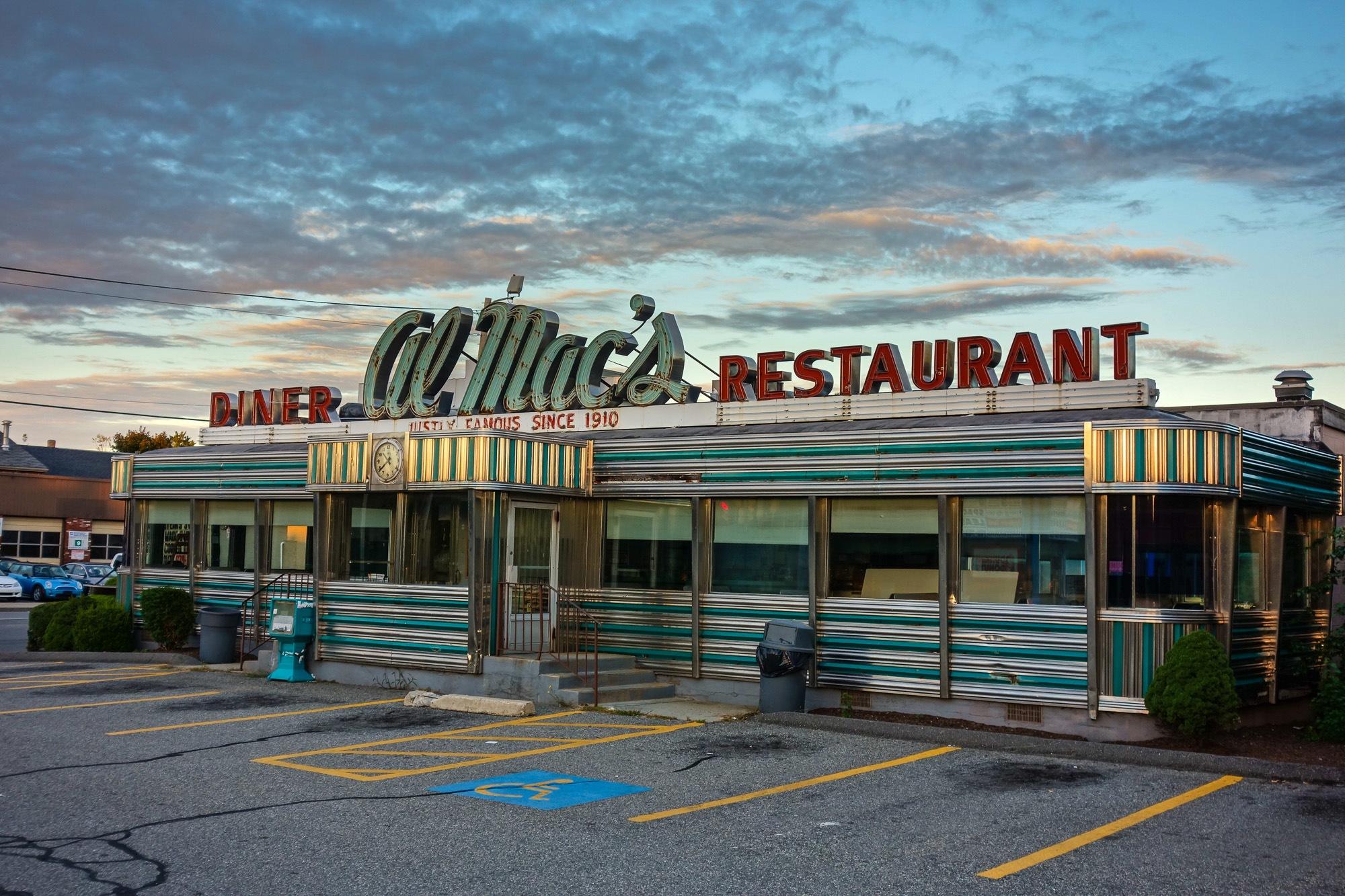

- Location within Massachusetts Location within the United States
- Location: 135 President Ave., Fall River, Massachusetts
- Coordinates: 41°42′58.3″N 71°09′14.3″W
- Built: 1953
- Architect: DeRaffele Diners
- Architectural style: Art Deco or Streamline
- MPS: Diners of Massachusetts MPS
- NRHP reference No.: 99001119
- Added to NRHP: December 20, 1999

Al Mac's Diner-Restaurant is an historic restaurant building at 135 President Avenue in Fall River, Massachusetts. It is an example of the stainless steel diners in Massachusetts, with rectangular massing, a flat roof, a projecting center entry vestibule, and rear kitchen wing.

The diner was built in 1953 and added to the National Register of Historic Places in 1999.

== History ==
Al McDermott (the Al Mac of the diner's name) started his business providing food and drink to Fall River mill workers from a horse-drawn wagon in 1910. McDermott opened several diners along the Northeast, including this one in 1953. The diner's original location was where Brightman Street Bridge sits currently. Then it was moved to the current site of Bicentennial Park; later it was moved directly across Davol Street.

The diner was closed in July 2012, due to the tough economic climate. After extensive cleaning and repair, the diner re-opened early 2013 under new management, with owner Robert Dunse as the chef, and Zachary Tenen as sous chef.

In 2019, The Dunse family sold the business to Cliff Ponte, current president of the Fall River City Council/former acting mayor, and his family. The local businessman and politician hired his father, Cliff Ponte Sr., to run the business. Ponte has cleaned up and refurbished the diner.

== Campaign stop ==
Al Mac's is a favorite stop for politicians on and off the campaign trail. This list includes Gov. Deval Patrick, Senate President William Bulger, Massachusetts Attorney General Martha Coakley, and the late Senator Ted Kennedy. Kennedy in particular paid many visits to the diner over his long service as a U.S. senator from Massachusetts. Coakley stopped at Al Mac's on Election Day during the 2010 Senate special election in Massachusetts. Footage showing her visit was broadcast on CNN and other major news networks covering the election.

== See also ==
- National Register of Historic Places listings in Fall River, Massachusetts
- Corner Lunch
