= Charles Kirk Kirby =

American architect

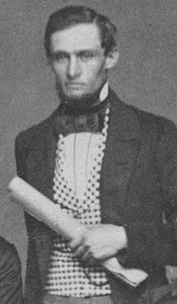
Kirby, c.1855

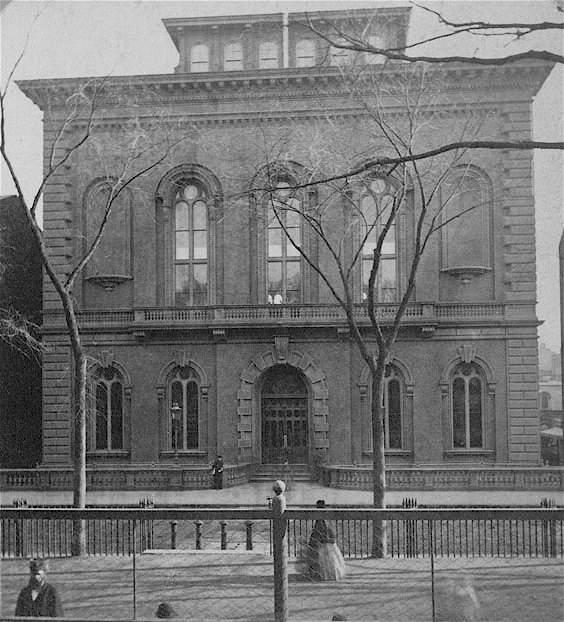
Public Library, Boston, MA. 1855.

Charles Kirk Kirby (Boston, 1826 – April 5, 1910) was an American architect who practiced in Massachusetts, Maine, and California.

In the 1840s he began studying architecture in the office of early Worcester architect William Brown. Brown moved to Lowell in 1847, and Kirby was his successor. He and another of Brown's students, Phineas Ball (later of Boyden & Ball), formed a partnership, Kirby & Ball. They parted ways after only eight months, and Kirby left for Portland, Maine.

Kirby is last documented in Portland in 1850, and in 1852 he came to Boston. His first major commission in Boston, the Boston Public Library, was won in competition in 1855. This building, an elaborate Italianate structure, was completed in 1858 and demolished in 1899. Kirby was also the architect of the Worcester Free Public Library, built in 1860 and also since demolished.

He practiced general architecture until about the outbreak of the Civil War. He then turned to land development, designing, building, and selling homes in the Back Bay area. This appears to have been the bulk of his work for about a decade, when he returned to general practice. He continued to primarily design houses, with an exception in the Lawrence Model Lodging Houses, built in 1874. These apartments were built with a bequest from Abbott Lawrence, as housing for the poor.

In 1878, Kirby left Massachusetts for California, settling in San Francisco. Immediately prior to leaving Boston, he had formed a partnership with G. Wilton Lewis, as Kirby & Lewis. Though Kirby was not directly involved in the firm's affairs, but the two remained associated until 1882. At this time, Lewis opened his own office and Kirby established C. K. Kirby & Son in San Francisco, with son C. K. Kirby, Jr. The elder Kirby retired from architecture in 1889, and his son established a practice in Fresno.

After his retirement Kirby was the proprietor of the Sierra Park vineyard and winery near Fowler, with a distillery business in Selma. He died on April 5, 1910.

== Works ==
C. K. Kirby, 1847-1878:

- First Congregational Church, 655 Main St., Fryeburg, ME (1848-50)
- Nelson Reynolds House, 201 Main St., Auburn, ME (1850-51)
- Boston Public Library, 100 Boylston St., Boston, MA (1855-58) - Demolished.
- John Jarves House, 3 Jarves St., Sandwich, MA (1857)
- C. K. Kirby Houses, 136-138 Beacon St., Boston, MA (1860)
- Worcester Free Public Library, 16 Elm St., Worcester, MA (1860) - Demolished.
- Crowninshield/Mountford Houses, 156-158 Beacon St., Boston, MA (1861) - Demolished.
- C. K. Kirby Houses, 9-15 Marlborough St., Boston, MA (1863) - Kirby kept no. 15 as his own.
- C. K. Kirby Houses, 119-121 Beacon St., Boston, MA (1865)
- C. K. Kirby Houses, 222-224 Beacon St., Boston, MA (1865)
- C. K. Kirby Houses, 70-80 Marlborough St., Boston, MA (1866)
- C. K. Kirby Houses, 66-68 Marlborough St., Boston, MA (1870)
- Charles Kirby House, 105 Woodland St., Worcester, MA (1870)
- Fire Station No. 2, 350 Washington St., Brookline, MA (1871)
- Houses, 304-310 Beacon St., Boston, MA (1871) - 308-310 Demolished.
- James M. Standish Houses, 105-115 Marlborough St., Boston, MA (1871-72) - 107 Demolished.
- C. G. Chase Block, 103-110 Arch St., Boston, MA (1873)
- Thomas Long Block, 38-40 Summer St., Boston, MA (1873)
- Lawrence Model Lodging Houses, E. Canton St., Boston, MA (1874)

Kirby & Lewis, 1878-1882:

- Asa H. Caton Houses, 319-323 Commonwealth Ave., Boston, MA (1878-79)
- Social Hall, 24 Ferry St., Malden, MA (c.1879) - Demolished.
- Asa H. Caton Houses, 337-341 Commonwealth Ave., Boston, MA (1880)
- Dennison Manufacturing Co. Factory, 43-45 Vale St., Roxbury, MA (1880)
- Albert E. Harding House, 374 Marlborough St., Boston, MA (1880)
- Sumner R. Mead House, 284 Commonwealth Ave., Boston, MA (1880-81)
- Frank H. Skinner House, 372 Marlborough St., Boston, MA (1880)
- James W. Tobey House, 327 Commonwealth Ave., Boston, MA (1880)
- Preston Building, 179 Summer St., Boston, MA (c.1881) - Demolished.

C. K. Kirby & Son, 1882-1889:

- First National Bank Building, Mariposa & Broadway Sts., Fresno, CA (1888-89) - Demolished.
