= Worcester Corset Company Factory =

- U.S. National Register of Historic Places
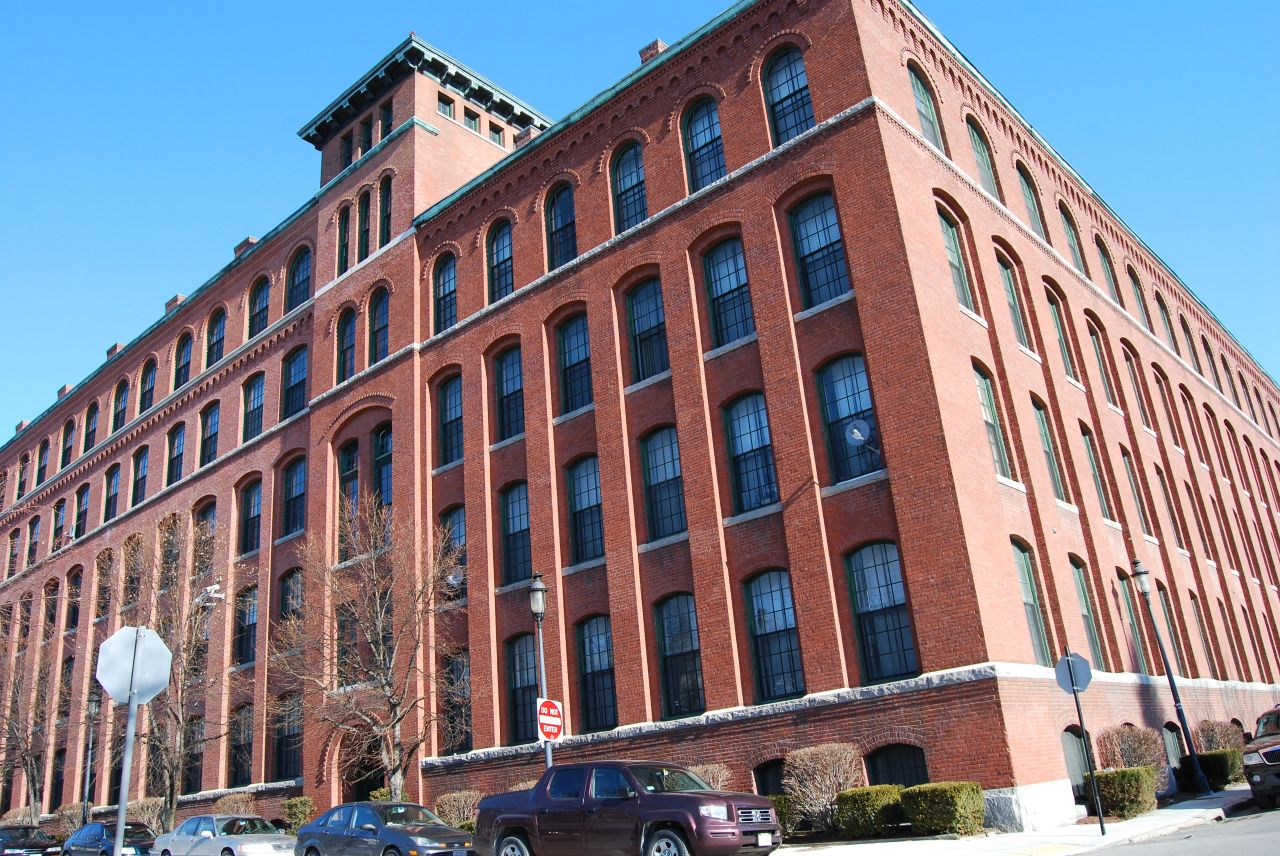

- Location within Massachusetts Location within the United States
- Location: 30 Wyman St., Worcester, Massachusetts
- Coordinates: 42°14′56″N 71°49′10″W
- Built: 1895
- Architect: Arthur F. Gray
- Architectural style: Romanesque
- MPS: Worcester MRA
- NRHP reference No.: 84000097
- Added to NRHP: October 4, 1984

The Worcester Corset Company Factory is an historic factory building at 30 Wyman Street in Worcester, Massachusetts in the Main South neighborhood. The oldest part of the factory was built in 1895, with expansion of the facilities taking place up to 1909. The buildings were designed by Arthur F. Gray for the Worcester Corset Company, whose origins date to an 1861 business by David Hale Fanning making hoops for skirts, but shifted to manufacturing corsets after fashions changed. Fanning's business was immensely successful, and he became one of Worcester's larger employers. At one point it employed over 2000 women. After the Corset Company folded in 1940, the facility was used to manufacture military-style boots. The factory is now an apartment complex.

The factory was listed on the National Register of Historic Places in 1984.

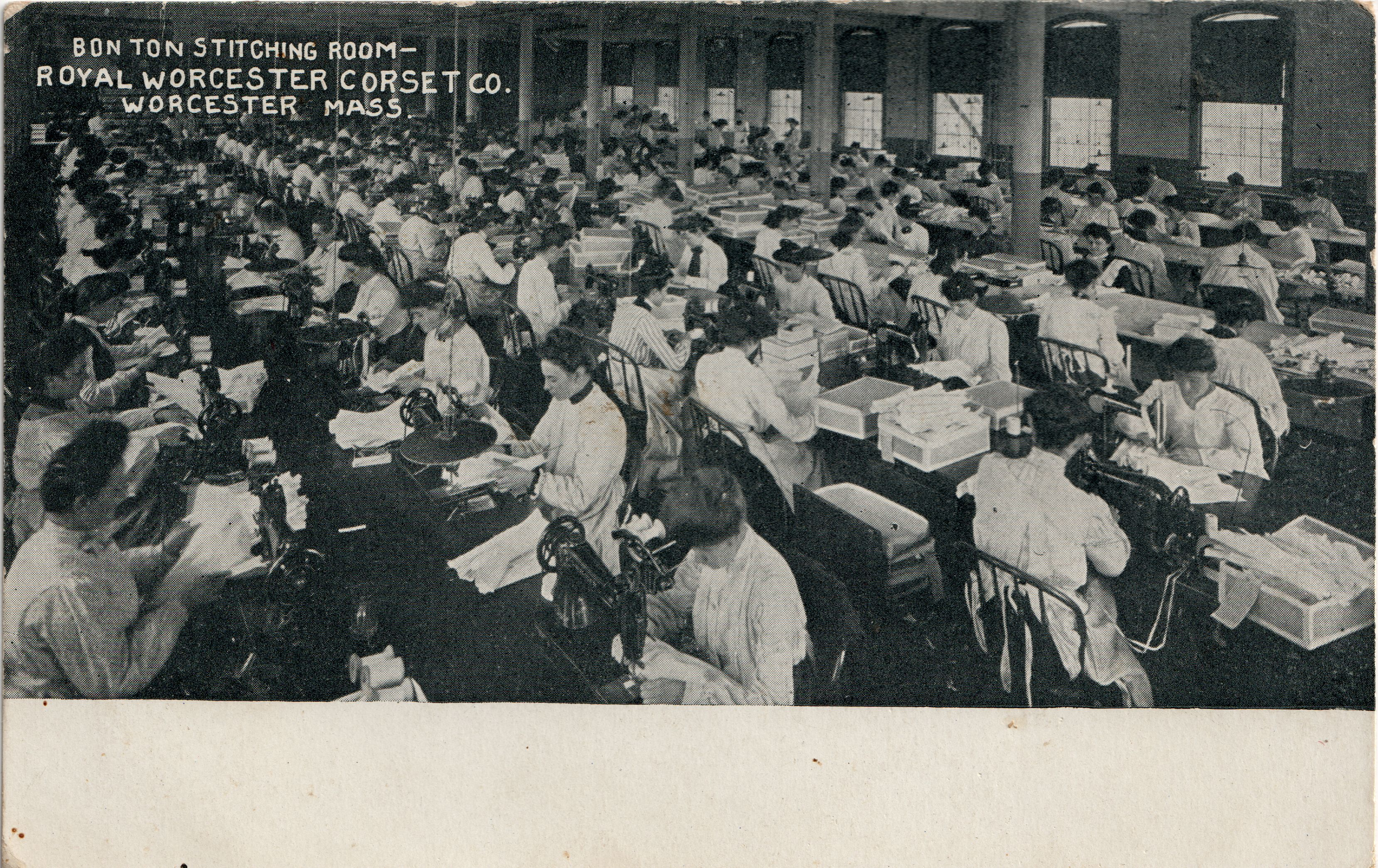
Women at work in the factory, circa 1910s or 1920s

== See also ==
- Baystate Corset Block, NRHP-listed in Springfield, Massachusetts
- Kraus Corset Factory, NRHP-listed in Derby, Connecticut
- Strouse, Adler Company Corset Factory, NRHP-listed in New Haven, Connecticut
- National Register of Historic Places listings in southwestern Worcester, Massachusetts
