= Woodland Street Historic District =

Historic district in Massachusetts, United States

- U.S. National Register of Historic Places
- U.S. Historic district
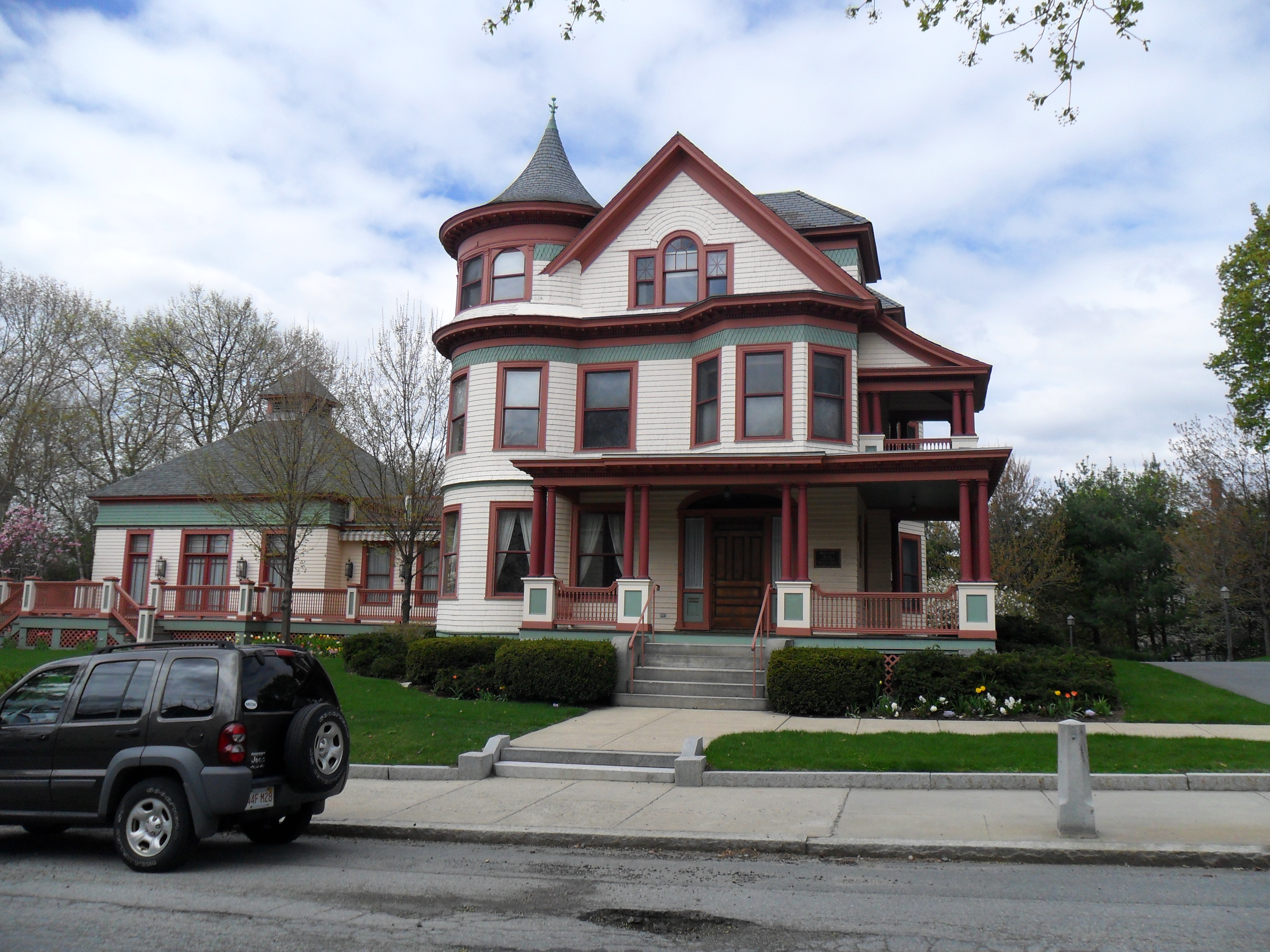
- Harrington House, home to Presidents of Clark University

- Location within Massachusetts Location within the United States
- Location: Properties along Hawthorne, Loudon, Norwood, and Woodland Sts., Worcester, Massachusetts
- Coordinates: 42°15′11″N 71°49′15″W
- Built: 1868
- Architect: Arthur F. Gray et al.
- Architectural style: Colonial Revival, Second Empire, Queen Anne
- MPS: Worcester MRA
- NRHP reference No.: 80000549
- Added to NRHP: March 05, 1980

The Woodland Street Historic District is a historic housing district in the Main South area of Worcester, Massachusetts. It consists of 19 Victorian houses that either face or abut on Woodland Street, between Charlotte and Oberlin Streets. The district was listed on the National Register of Historic Places in 1980. Located directly adjacent to the campus of Clark University, some of the buildings are used by Clark for housing and administration.

When Woodland Street was first developed beginning in the late 1860s, it was on the fringes of development in the city. Seven houses were built on the west side of the street, on large lots, and only a few were built on the east side. In the 1890s development accelerated as growing demand for housing pushed the urbanized parts of the city closer to the area. By 1904, the large lots on the west side were subdivided and filled in with additional houses, and the east side was fully developed.

The houses built in the second phase are either Queen Anne (those built early in the 1890s) or Colonial Revival (those built later). The Frank Heath House at 11 Loudon Street is a particularly notable Colonial Revival house, with a high hip roof, a full front porch, and Palladian windows.

== Development of the neighborhood ==
=== Second Empire Period (c. 1868-1870) ===
The houses that were built in the first phase of development are predominantly Second Empire in their styling such as the J.E. Drury House built c. 1869 (104 Woodland), with the exception of the Italianate Charles Kirby House built c. 1870 (105 Woodland). The Henry G. Taft House built c. 1868 (118 Woodland) was originally owned by Henry Gordon Taft of Uxbridge, who served as the Commissioner of Worcester County from 1876 to 1903. Three of the five original Second Empire houses—the Andrew Schofield House (c. 1868), Sumner Wallace House (c. 1870), and William Brason House (c.1870) -- have been destroyed.

=== Gothic Revival Period (c. 1876-1881) ===
Growth slowed in the decade following the Panic of 1873, when just three Gothic Revival houses were built. The Corner House built c. 1876 (142 Woodland) was first occupied by John R. Hill, owner of the National Manufacturing Company, and currently houses the International Center at Clark University. The building "has an unusual 'L' floor plan with the main entry of the house located at the junction of the two wings," and the exterior remains "virtually unaltered" with "gable aprons, decorated window caps, and a fine, original front porch." The Henry T. Farrar House was built next circa 1877 (112 Woodland). The final Gothic Revival house built in 1881 (114 Woodland) was designed by Worcester architectural firm Barker & Nourse for Wade H. Hill, owner of the W.H. Hill Envelope Manufacturing Company. The building now houses the Center for Counseling and Personal Growth at Clark.

=== Queen Anne Period (1888-1898) ===
- Homer Caldwell House, 24 Loudon St. (1888), Queen Anne.
- Carriage House, 125 Woodland St. (1890), Queen Anne.
- Hampton House (formerly All Souls' Universalist Church), 111 Woodland St. (1891), Queen Anne; Arthur F. Gray, architect.
- J.F. Warren House, 10 Norwood St. (1892-1893), Queen Anne; John B. Woodworth, architect.
- Edgar Reed House, 106 Woodland St. (1894), Queen Anne; John P. Kingston, architect.
- J.E. Dickson House, 138 Woodland St. (1894), Queen Anne.
- Harrington House, 130 Woodland St. (1898), Queen Anne.

=== Colonial Revival Period (1900-1904) ===
- Anderson House, 12 Hawthorne St. (1900), Colonial Revival.
- Cohen Lasry House, 11 Hawthorne St. (1900-1902), Colonial Revival.
- Beck House, 11 Loudon St. (1904), Colonial Revival.

== See also ==
- Woodland Street Firehouse
- National Register of Historic Places listings in southwestern Worcester, Massachusetts
- National Register of Historic Places listings in Worcester County, Massachusetts
