= Main South =

Neighborhood in Massachusetts, US

Coordinates: 42.25°N 71.82°W

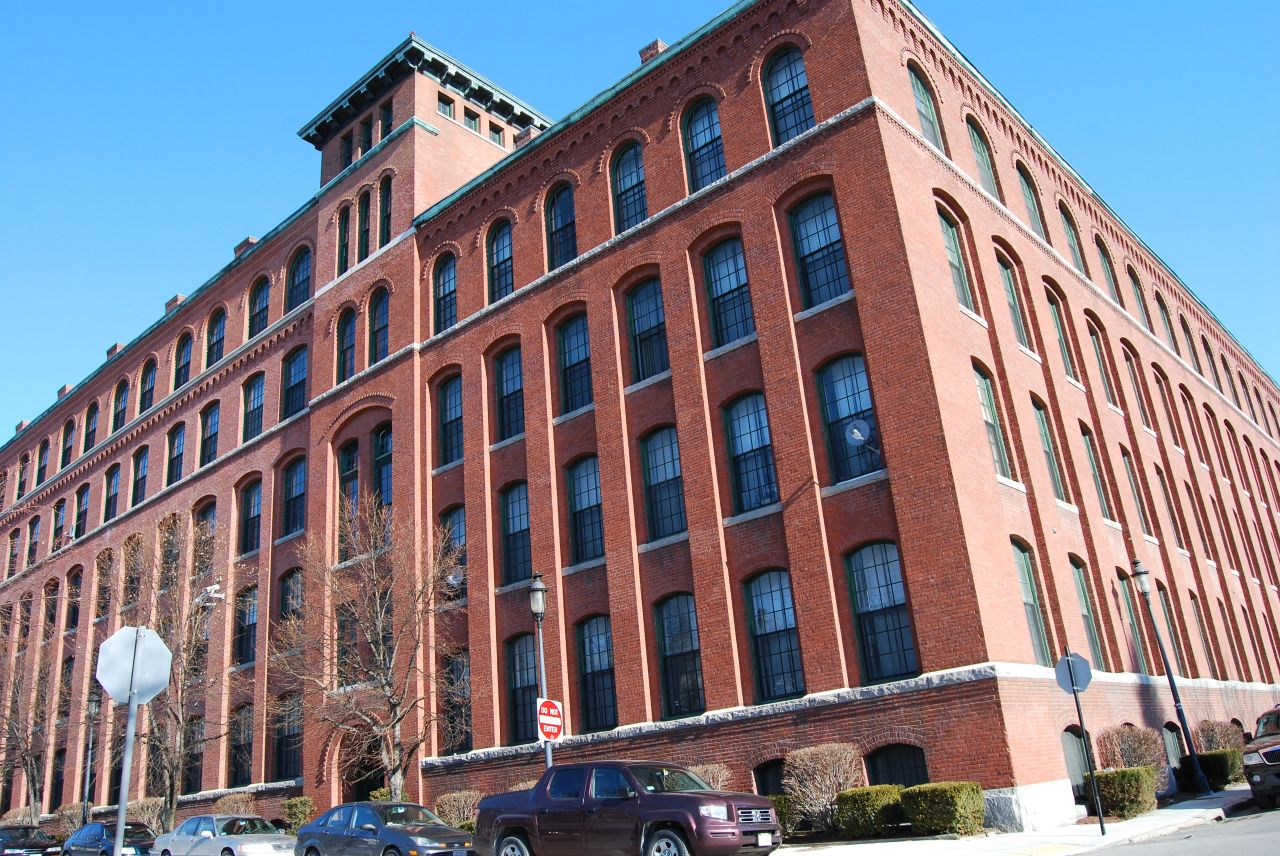
Worcester Corset Company Factory on Wyman Street.

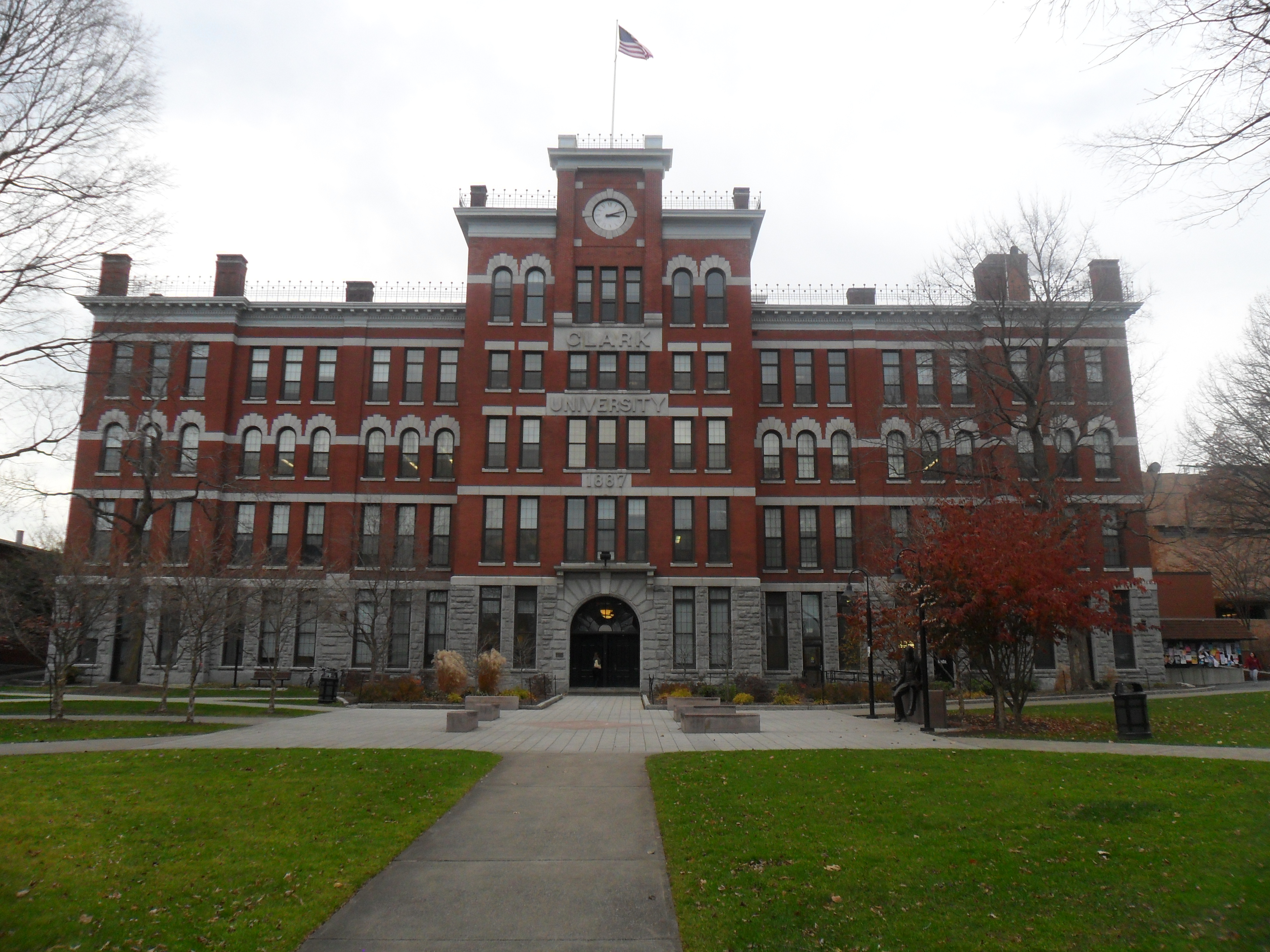
Jonas Clark Hall, built in 1887, is the main academic building at Clark University.

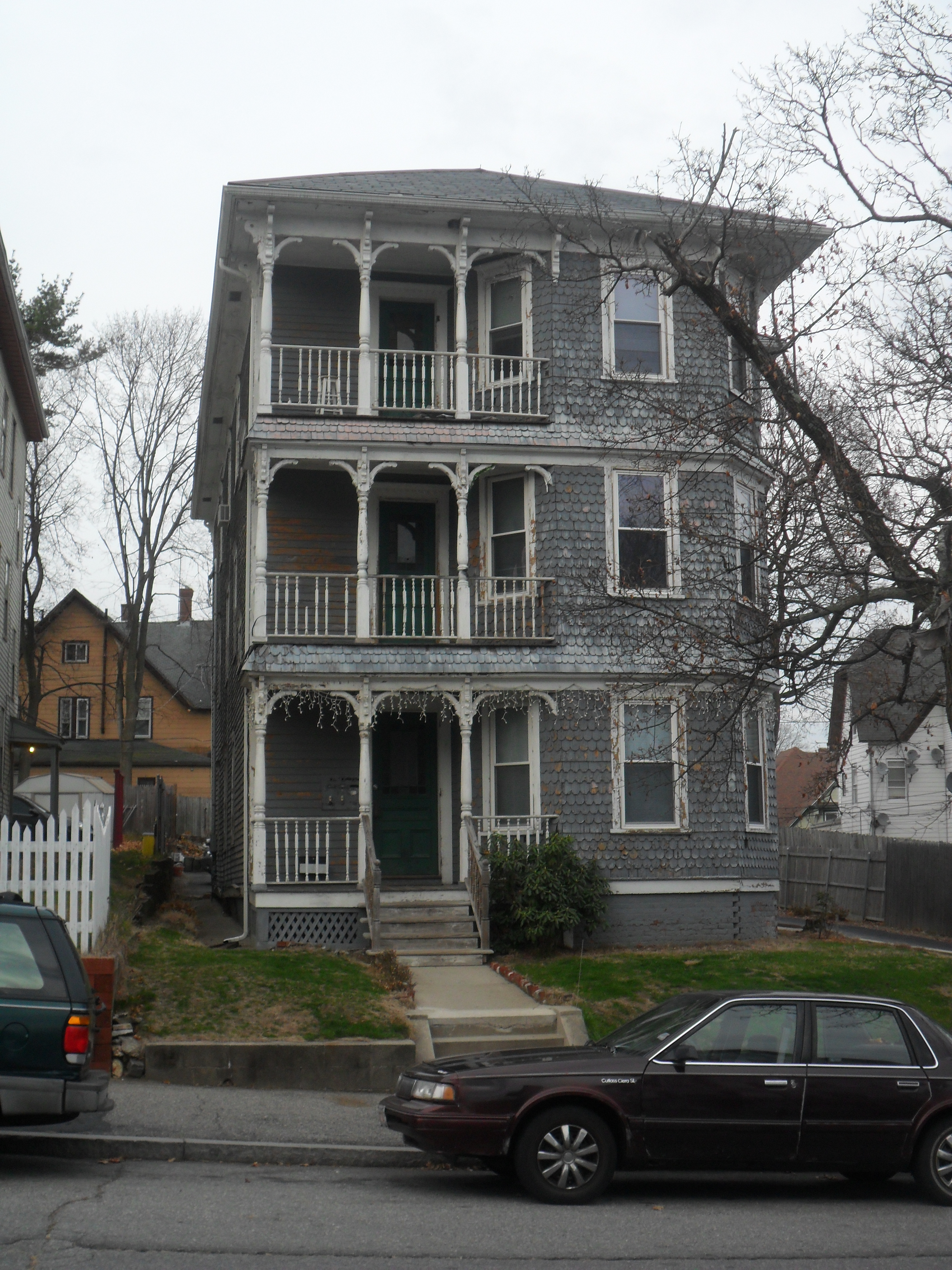
The Daniel Hunt Three-Decker, located at 9 Wyman Street, was built in 1890.

Main South (or South Main) is a neighborhood in southern Worcester, Massachusetts. The area's eponymous feature is Main Street, the central roadway of the city. Main South experienced rapid economic development from the 1890s until the 1950s.

== History ==
The history of the Main South neighborhood began when, in the 1840s, congressman Eli Thayer, a prominent abolitionist, bought land in southern Worcester in anticipation of rapid economic development. Thayer sold the land without extensive development in order to finance the New England Emigrant Aid Company, which sent abolitionist settlers to Kansas Territory in order to ensure that it would not become a slave state. Development began in the 1850s. In the 1880s, industrialist Jonas Gilman Clark bought land and founded Clark University in 1887. The Main South area has a history as a rough neighborhood, known for prostitution and hard drugs starting in the 1970s and that impression has stuck with the area, despite the fact that the Worcester Police Department has done a great deal to reduce the drug trade, and there has been some fairly successful urban renewal projects, particularly involving Clark University.

== Prominent locations ==
- Woodland Street Historic District
- Franklin Wesson House
- University Park
- South Unitarian Church
- Worcester Corset Company Factory
- Clark University
