= Worcester, Massachusetts =

- City
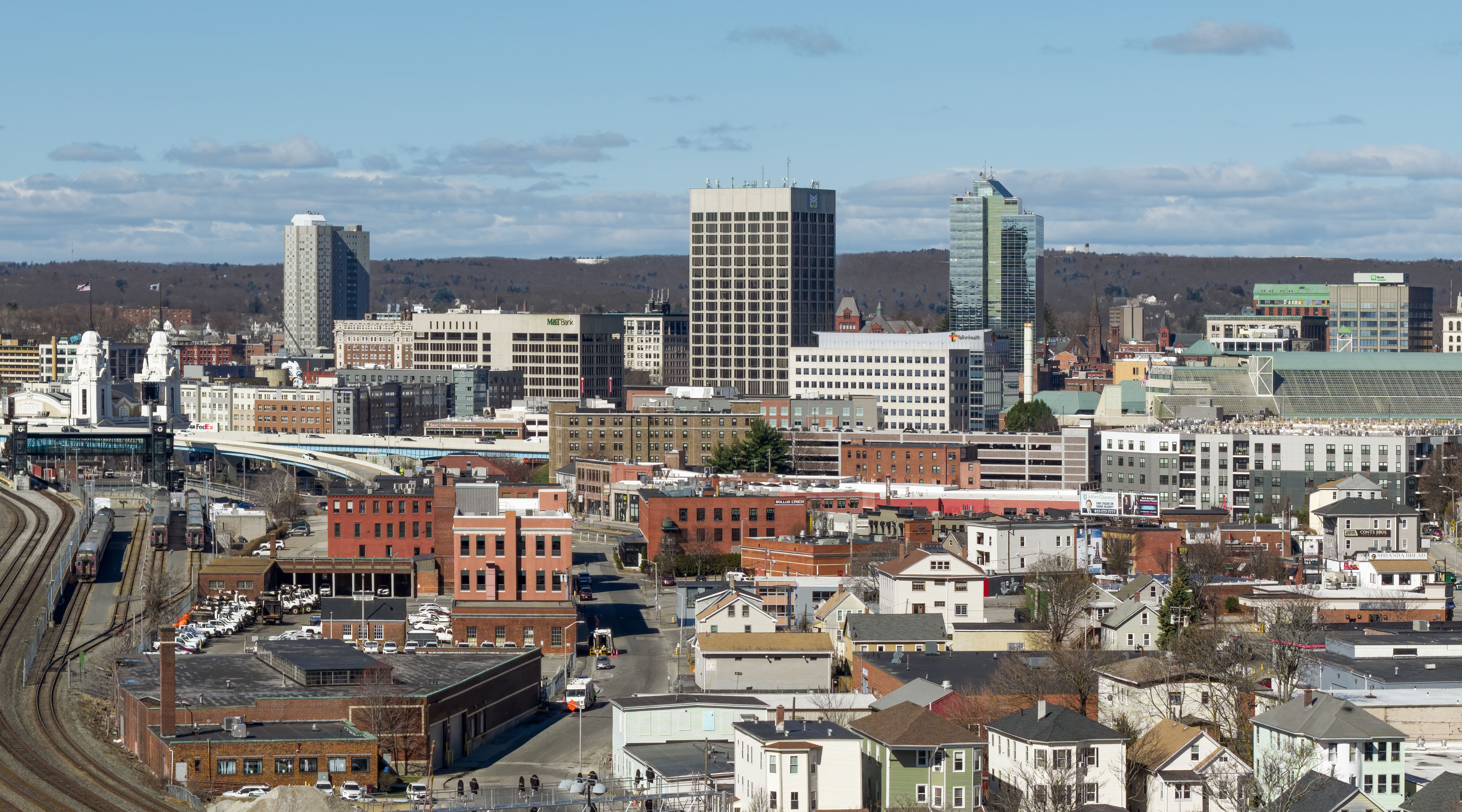
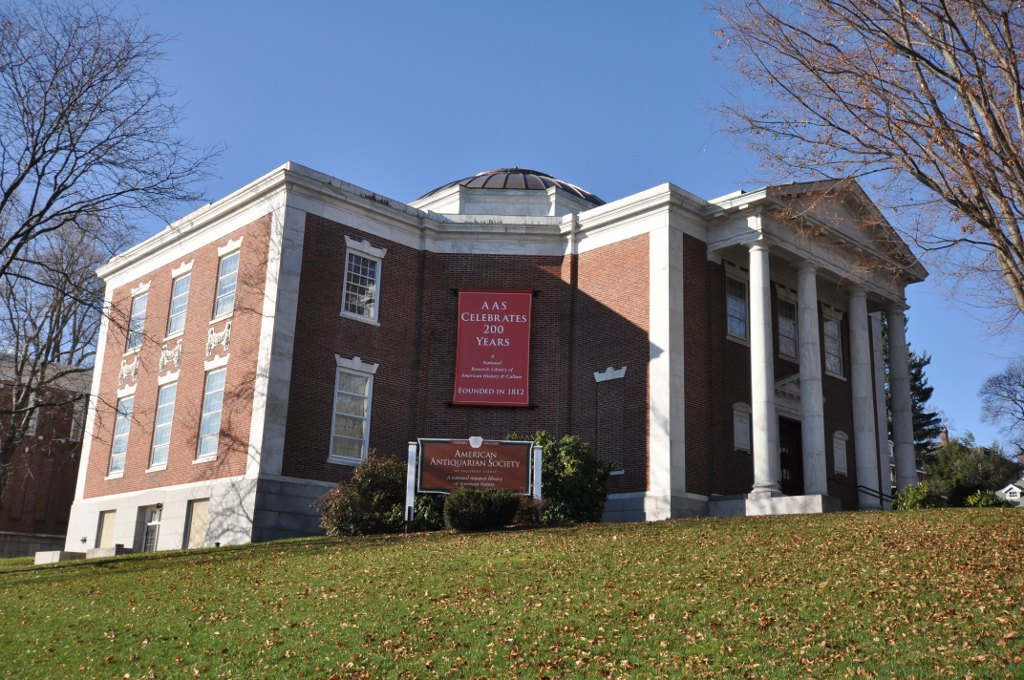
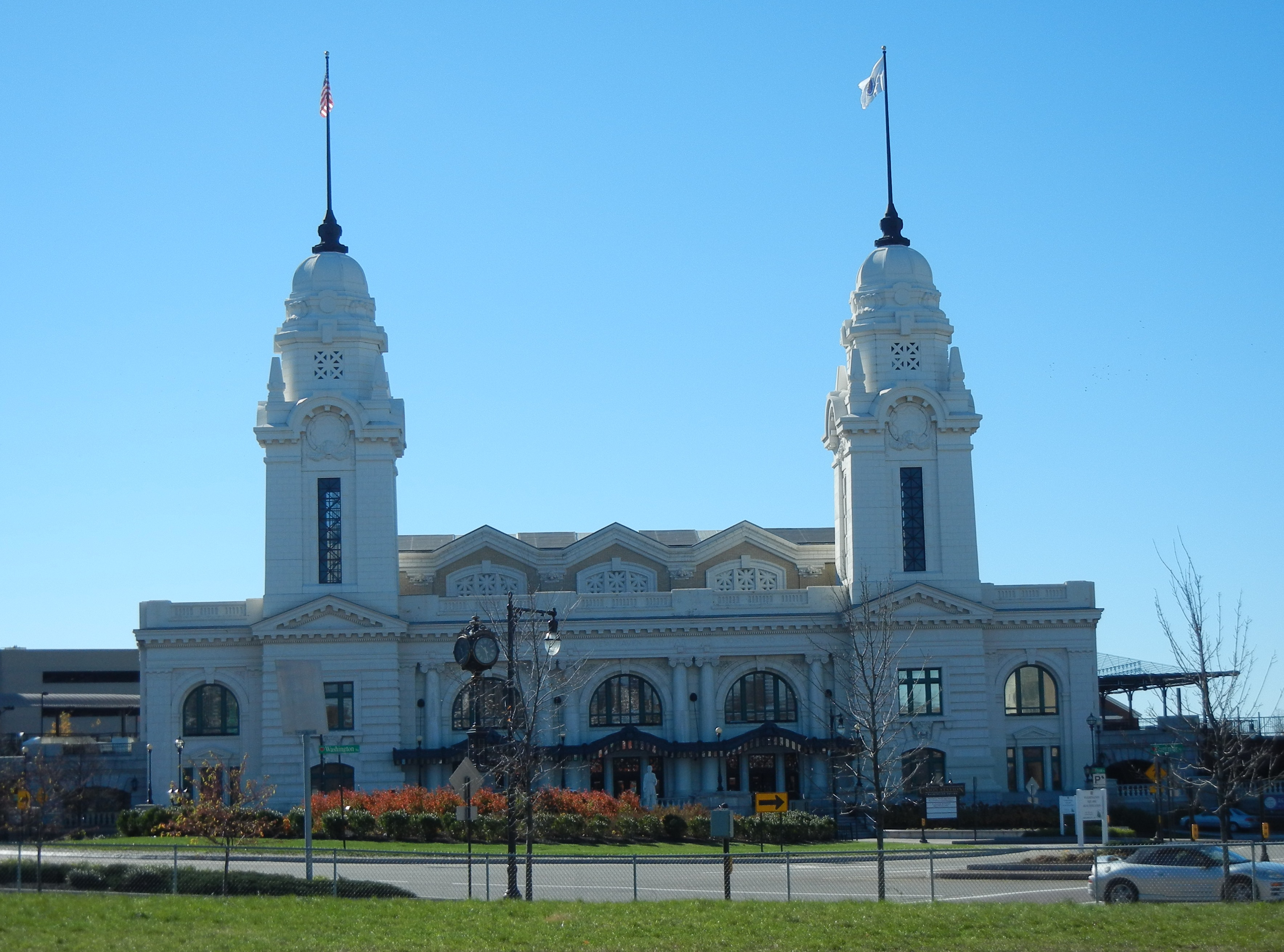
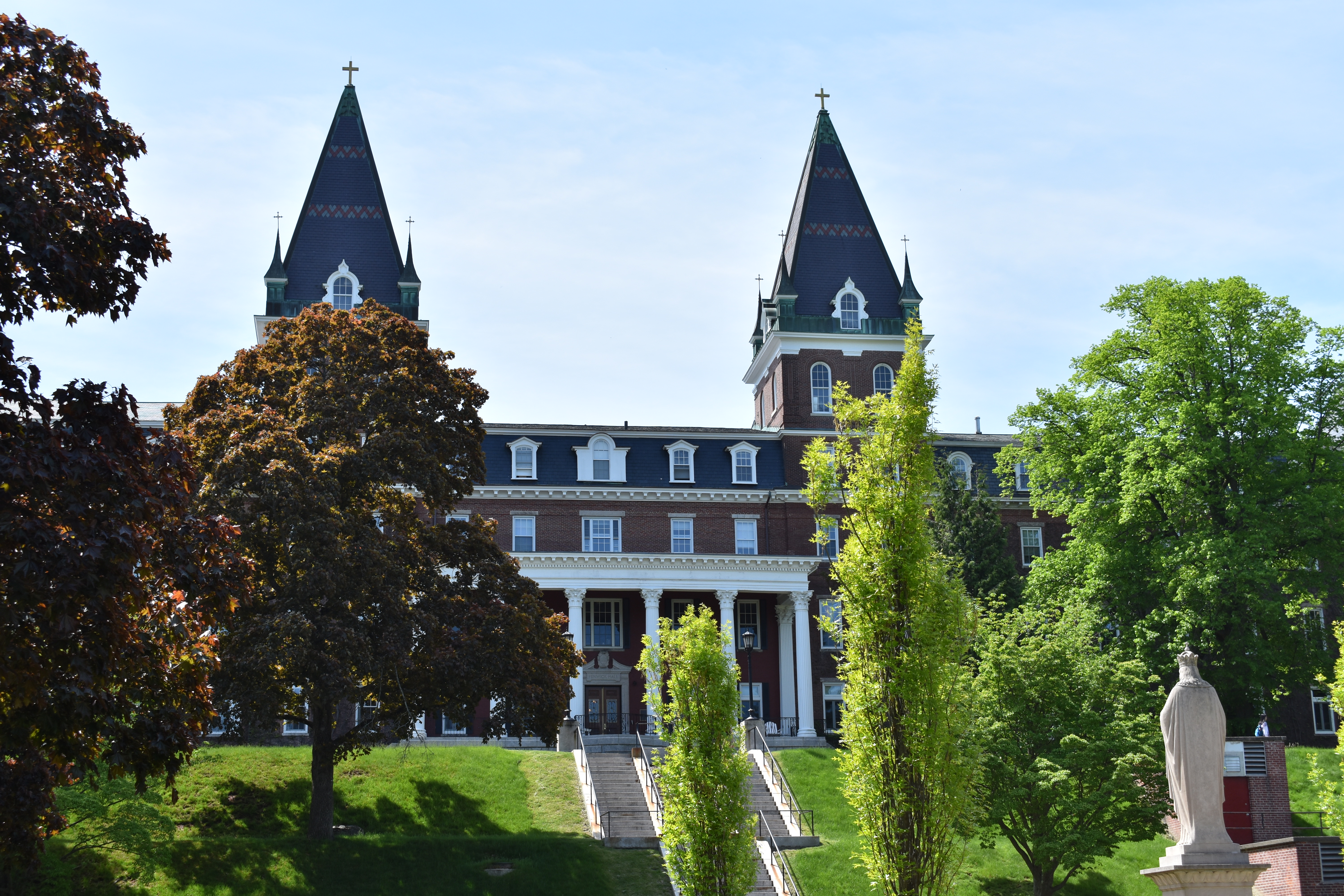
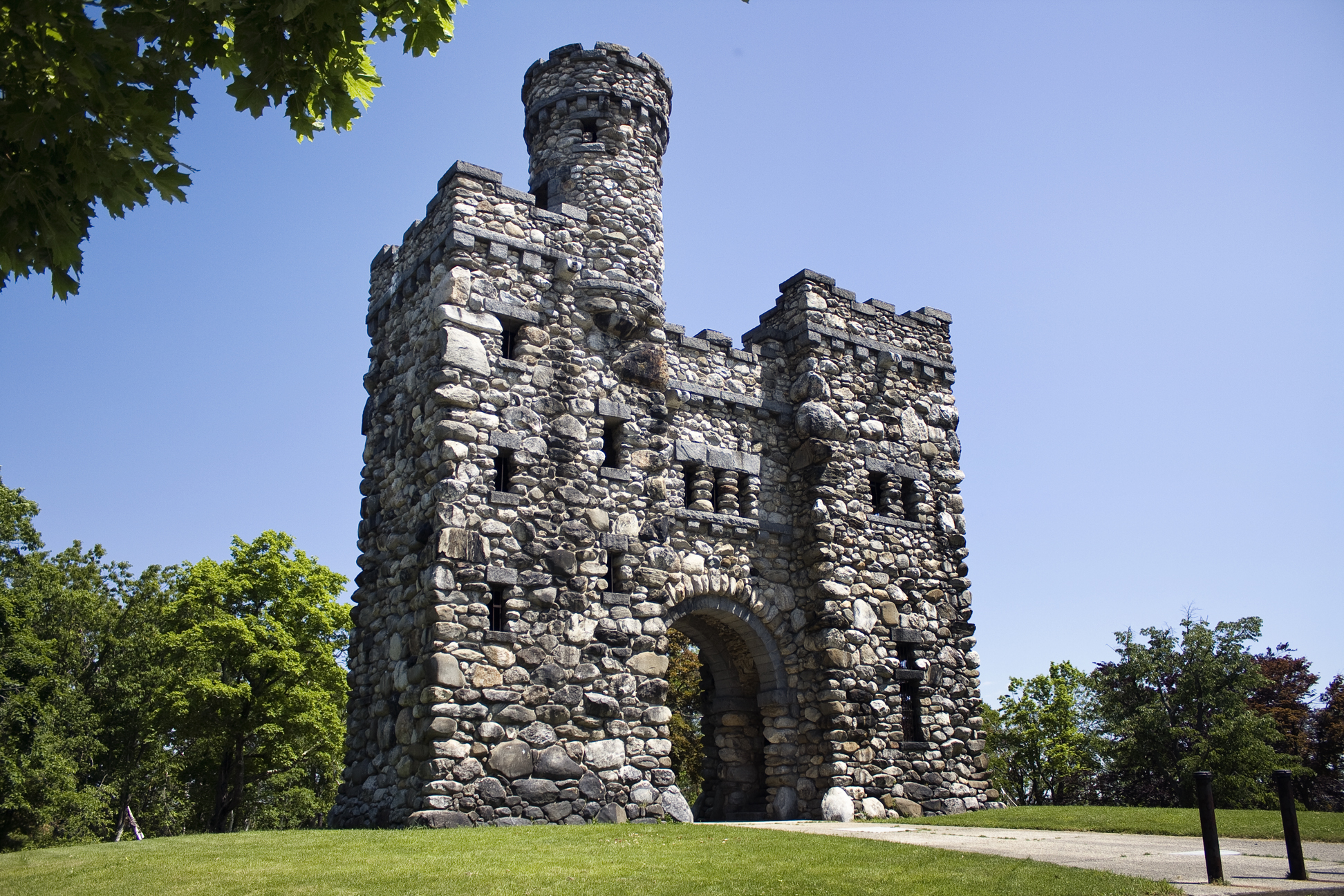
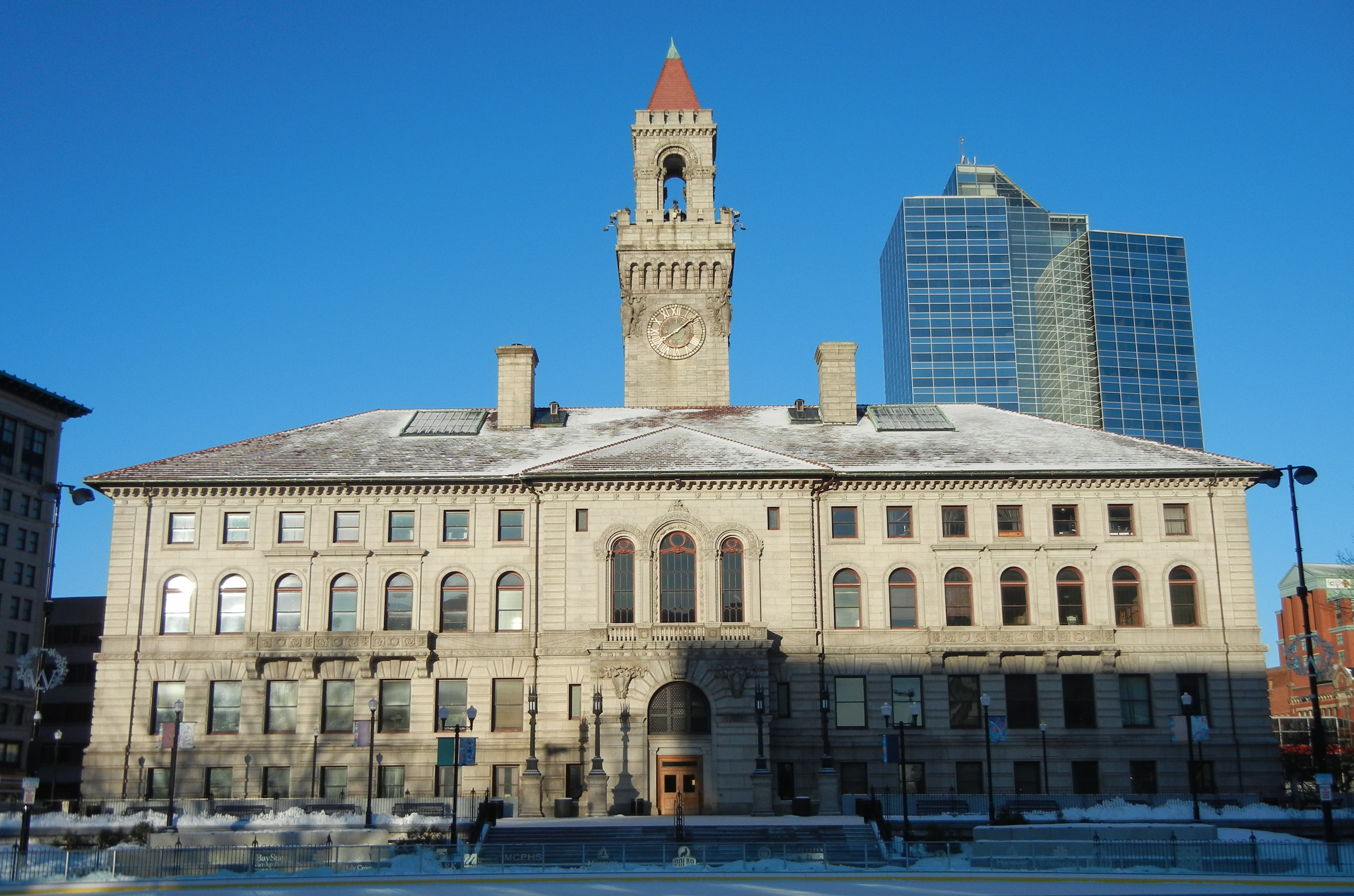
- Worcester city skyline American Antiquarian Society Union Station College of the Holy Cross Bancroft Tower Worcester City Hall and Common

- Flag Seal
- Nicknames: The City of the Seven Hills, The Heart of the Commonwealth, Wormtown, Woo-town, The Woo
- Location within Worcester County

- Location within Massachusetts Location within the United States
- Coordinates: 42°16′17″N 71°47′56″W
- Country: United States
- State: Massachusetts
- County: Worcester
- Region: New England
- Historic colonies: Massachusetts Bay Colony; Dominion of New England; Province of Massachusetts Bay
- Settled: 1673
- Incorporated as a town: June 14, 1722
- Incorporated as a city: February 29, 1848
- Named for: Worcester, Worcestershire

Government
  - Type: Council–manager
  - Mayor: Joseph Petty (D)
  - City Council: Councilor-at-Large: Khrystian King (D), Vice Chairman; Councilor-at-Large: Morris Bergman (D); Councilor-at-Large: Satya Mitra (I); Councilor-at-Large: Gary Rosen (D); Councilor-at-Large: Kathleen Toomey (D); District 1: Tony Economou (I); District 2: Robert Bilotta (D); District 3: John Frisolo (D); District 4: Luis Ojeda (I); District 5: Jose Rivera (I)

Area
  - City: 38.44 sq mi (99.57 km^{2})
  - Land: 37.36 sq mi (96.76 km^{2})
  - Water: 1.08 sq mi (2.81 km^{2})
- Elevation: 479 ft (146 m)

Population (2020)
  - City: 206,518 (US: 113th)
  - Density: 5,527.7/sq mi (2,134.27/km^{2})
  - Urban: 482,085 (US: 87th)
  - Urban density: 1,852/sq mi (715.1/km^{2})
  - Metro: 862,111 (US: US: 69th)
- Time zone: UTC−5 (Eastern)
  - Summer (DST): UTC−4 (Eastern)
- ZIP Codes: 01601–01610, 01613–01615, 01653, 01655
- Area code: 508 / 774
- FIPS code 0: 25-82000
- GNIS feature ID: 0617867
- Metropolitan GDP: $51.932240 billion (2023, in 2017 US chained dollars)
- Website: worcesterma.gov

Worcester (/ˈwʊstər/ WUUST-ər, locally [ˈwɪstə]) is a city in the U.S. state of Massachusetts. The principal city of Central Massachusetts, Worcester is both the second-most populous city in the state, and the 113th most populous city in the United States. (Note: Louisville's "balance" population is considered in determining rank among cities in the U.S.) Named after Worcester, England, the city had an estimated 213,862 people as of 2025, also making it the second-most populous city in New England, after Boston. Because it is near the geographic center of Massachusetts, Worcester is known as the "Heart of the Commonwealth"; a heart is the official symbol of the city. Worcester is the historical seat of Worcester County.

Founded and incorporated as a town in 1722 and incorporated in 1848 as a city, Worcester developed as an industrial city in the 19th century due to the Blackstone Canal and railways, which facilitated the import of raw materials and the export of finished goods such as machines, textiles, and wire. The city's population grew, driven by European immigration. After World War II, manufacturing in Worcester waned, and the city declined, both economically and in terms of population. This trend was reversed in the 1990s, when higher education, medicine, biotechnology, and new immigrants started making their mark on the city. The population has grown by 28% since 1980, reaching its all-time high in the 2020 census, in an example of urban renewal. Since the 1970s, and especially since the construction of Route 146 and interstates 90, 190, 290, 395, and 495, both Worcester and its surrounding towns have become more integrated with Boston's suburbs. The Worcester region now marks the western periphery of the Boston–Worcester–Providence (MA–RI–NH) census Combined Statistical Area (CSA), also known as Greater Boston.

Modern Worcester is known for its diversity and large immigrant population, with significant communities of Vietnamese, Brazilians, Albanians, Puerto Ricans, Ghanaians, Dominicans, Irish, English, Italians, Greeks, Jews and other immigrants. Twenty-two percent of Worcester's population was born outside the United States. A center of higher education, it is home to eight colleges and universities, including the College of the Holy Cross, Worcester Polytechnic Institute (WPI), Clark University, Assumption, and Worcester State University. Worcester has many 19th-century triple-decker houses, Victorian-era mills and related buildings, and lunch-car diners, such as Miss Worcester.

== History ==
The area was inhabited by members of the Nipmuc tribe at the time of European contact. The native people called the region Quinsigamond and built a settlement on Pakachoag Hill in Auburn.

In 1673, English settlers John Eliot and Daniel Gookin led an expedition to Quinsigamond to establish a new Christian Indian praying town and identify a new location for an English settlement. On July 13, 1674, Gookin obtained a deed to eight square miles (21 km^{2}) of land in Quinsigamond from the Nipmuc people and English traders and settlers began to inhabit the region.

In 1675, King Philip's War broke out throughout New England with the Nipmuc Indians coming to the aid of Indian leader King Philip. The English settlers completely abandoned the Quinsigamond area and the empty buildings were burned by the Indian forces. The town was again abandoned during Queen Anne's War in 1702.

In 1713, Worcester was permanently resettled for a third and final time by Jonas Rice. Named after the city of Worcester, England, the town was incorporated on June 14, 1722.

On April 2, 1731, Worcester was chosen as the county seat of the newly founded Worcester County government. Between 1755 and 1758, future U.S. president John Adams worked as a schoolteacher and studied law in Worcester.

Worcester also had a role in the start of the American Revolution. On September 6, 1774, 4,622 militiamen from 37 towns in Worcester County assembled and marched on Main Street, Worcester; they sought to shut down the Crown's court before it could sit for a new session. The event was dubbed the Worcester Revolution, or the Worcester Revolt. Having seized the courthouse, the militiamen waited for the 25 appointees from the Crown to arrive, where they were denied entry and later forced to disavow their appointments by King George III. Bloodshed and violence was avoided, with no shots fired. British authority had been demonstrably overthrown in the American colonies for the first time.

In the 1770s, Worcester became a center of American revolutionary activity. The Worcester Revolt on September 6, 1774, was an early successful attempt to throw off British rule. British General Thomas Gage was given information of patriot ammunition stockpiled in Worcester in 1775. That same year, Massachusetts Spy publisher Isaiah Thomas moved his radical newspaper out of British occupied Boston to Worcester. Thomas would continuously publish his paper throughout the American Revolutionary War. On July 14, 1776, Thomas performed the first public reading in Massachusetts of the Declaration of Independence from the porch of the Old South Church, where the 19th-century Worcester City Hall stands today. He would later go on to form the American Antiquarian Society in Worcester in 1812. During the years leading up to and through the American Revolution, Worcester was an important inland center of Patriot activity and organization. In 1755–1758, future U.S. president John Adams worked as a schoolteacher in Worcester while studying law, an experience that helped shape his later views on education and self-government.

By the early 1770s, Worcester's location on the main route between Boston and western Massachusetts made it a hub for revolutionary communication and militia mobilization. In September 1774, local Patriots forced royal officials to resign and closed the county courts, effectively ending British authority in Worcester County months before the battles of Lexington and Concord.

According to local tradition, John Hancock briefly took refuge in Worcester in 1774–1775 as tensions escalated in Boston. In the winter of 1775–1776, General Henry Knox's famous "noble train of artillery" passed through Worcester while transporting captured cannon from Fort Ticonderoga to Boston, stopping for supplies and repairs on its way to aid the siege of the city.

Worcester continued to commemorate its Revolutionary heritage in the decades that followed. When the Marquis de Lafayette made his triumphal tour of the United States in 1824, he was greeted with great ceremony in Worcester by local citizens and surviving veterans of the Revolution.

Throughout the conflict, Worcester's residents contributed soldiers, supplies, and civic leadership to the Patriot cause, leaving a lasting legacy reflected in the city's Revolutionary monuments and archives.

During the turn of the 19th century, Worcester's economy moved into manufacturing. Factories producing textiles, shoes and clothing opened along the nearby Blackstone River.

The manufacturing industry in Worcester began to thrive with the opening of the Blackstone Canal in 1828 and the opening of the Worcester and Boston Railroad in 1835. The city transformed into a transportation hub and the manufacturing industry flourished.

Worcester was officially chartered as a city on February 29, 1848. The city's industries soon attracted immigrants of primarily Irish, Scottish, French, German, and Swedish descent in the mid-19th century and later many immigrants of Lithuanian, Polish, Italian, Greek, Turkish, Armenian, Syrian, and Lebanese descent. Immigrants moved into new three-decker houses (which originated in Worcester) lining hundreds of Worcester's expanding streets and neighborhoods.

In 1831, Ichabod Washburn opened the Washburn & Moen Company. The company would become the largest wire manufacturing in the country and Washburn became one of the leading industrial and philanthropic figures in the city.

Worcester became a center of machinery, wire products and power looms with large manufacturers, including Washburn & Moen, Wyman-Gordon Company, American Steel & Wire, Morgan Construction and the Norton Company. In 1908, the Royal Worcester Corset Company was the largest employer of women in the United States.

Candlepin bowling was first played in Worcester in 1880. Esther Howland began the first line of Valentine's Day cards from her Worcester home in 1847. Loring Coes invented the first monkey wrench and Russell Hawes created the first envelope folding machine. On June 12, 1880, Lee Richmond pitched the first perfect game in Major league baseball history for the Worcester Ruby Legs at the Worcester Agricultural Fairgrounds. The first three-decker homes were built by Francis Gallagher (1830–1911) in Worcester.

=== Urban changes and recovery ===
After World War II, Worcester began to fall into decline as the city lost its manufacturing base. Worcester felt the national trends of movement away from historic urban centers. The city's population dropped over 20% from 1950 to 1980. In the mid-20th century, large urban renewal projects were undertaken to try to reverse the city's decline. A huge area of downtown Worcester was demolished for new office towers and the 1,000,000 sq ft (93,000 m^{2}) Worcester Center Galleria shopping mall. After 30 years, the Galleria would lose most of its major tenants and its appeal to more suburban shopping malls around Worcester County.

On June 9, 1953, an F4 tornado touched down in Petersham, northwest of Worcester. The tornado tore through 48 miles (77 km) of Worcester County including a large area of the city of Worcester. The tornado left massive destruction and killed 94 people. The Worcester tornado would be the deadliest tornado ever to hit Massachusetts, and New England in general. Debris from the tornado landed as far away as Dedham.

In the 1960s, Interstate 290 was built right through the center of Worcester, permanently dividing the city. In 1963, Worcester native Harvey Ball introduced the yellow smiley face to American culture.

In the late 20th century, Worcester's economy began to recover as the city expanded into biotechnology and healthcare fields. The UMass Chan Medical School became a leader in biomedical research and the Massachusetts Biotechnology Research Park became a center of medical research and development. Worcester hospitals Saint Vincent Hospital and UMass Memorial Health Care are two of the largest employers in the city. Worcester's many colleges, including the Quinsigamond Community College, College of the Holy Cross, Worcester Polytechnic Institute, Clark University, UMass Medical School, Assumption University, Massachusetts College of Pharmacy and Health Sciences, and Worcester State University, attract many students to the area and help drive the new economy.

=== Since 1997 ===
In recent decades, a renewed interest in the city's downtown has brought new investment and construction to Worcester. A Convention Center was built along the DCU Center arena in downtown Worcester in 1997. On December 3, 1999, a homeless couple accidentally started a five-alarm fire at the Worcester Cold Storage & Warehouse Company. The fire took the lives of six firemen and drew national attention as one of the worst firefighting tragedies of the late 20th century. President Bill Clinton, Vice President Al Gore and other local and national dignitaries attended the funeral service and memorial program in Worcester.

In 2000, Worcester's Union Station reopened after 25 years and a $32 million renovation. Hanover Insurance helped fund a multimillion-dollar renovation to the old Franklin Square Theater into the Hanover Theatre for the Performing Arts. In 2000, the Massachusetts College of Pharmacy and Health Sciences built a new campus in downtown Worcester. In 2007, Worcester Polytechnic Institute opened the first facility in their Gateway Park center in Lincoln Square. In 2004, Berkeley Investments proposed demolishing the old Worcester Center Galleria for a new mixed-used development called City Square. The ambitious project looked to reconnect old street patterns while creating a new retail, commercial and living destination in the city. After struggling to secure finances for a number of years, Hanover Insurance took over the project and demolition began on September 13, 2010. Unum Insurance and the Saint Vincent Hospital leased into the project and both facilities opened in 2013. The new Front Street opened on December 31, 2012.

The city has successfully resettled over 2,000 refugees coming from over 24 countries. Most of these refugees come from the Democratic Republic of the Congo, Iraq, Somalia, Bhutan, Syria, Ukraine and Afghanistan.

In 2025, Worcester City Council passed a resolution to become a sanctuary city for the transgender community.

== Geography ==
Worcester has a total area of 38.6 square miles (100 km^{2}): 37.6 square miles (97 km^{2}) of land and 1.0 square mile (2.6 km^{2}), comprising roughly 2.59%, of water. Worcester is bordered by the towns of Auburn, Grafton, Holden, Leicester, Millbury, Paxton, Shrewsbury, and West Boylston.

Worcester is known as the "Heart of the Commonwealth" because of its proximity to the center of Massachusetts. The city is about 40 miles (64 km) west of Boston, 50 miles (80 km) east of Springfield, and 38 miles (61 km) northwest of Providence, Rhode Island.

The Blackstone River forms in the center of Worcester by the confluence of the Middle River and Mill Brook. The river courses underground through the center of the city, and emerges at the foot of College Hill. It then flows south through Quinsigamond Village and into Millbury. Worcester is the beginning of the Blackstone Valley that frames the river. The Blackstone Canal was once an important waterway connecting Worcester to Providence and the Eastern Seaboard, but the canal closed in 1848 and was mostly covered up. In recent years, local organizations, including the Canal District Business Association, have proposed restoring the canal and creating a Blackstone Valley National Park.

Worcester is one of many cities claimed, like Rome, to be found on seven hills: Airport Hill, Bancroft Hill, Belmont Hill (Bell Hill), Grafton Hill, Green Hill, Pakachoag Hill and Vernon Hill. However, Worcester has more than seven hills, examples of which include Indian Hill, Newton Hill, Poet's Hill, and Wigwam Hill.

Worcester has many ponds and two prominent lakes: Indian Lake and Lake Quinsigamond. Lake Quinsigamond (also known as Long Pond) stretches four miles (6.4 km) across the Worcester and Shrewsbury border and is a very popular competitive rowing and boating destination.

=== Climate ===
Worcester's humid continental climate (Köppen: Dfb) is typical of New England. The weather changes rapidly owing to the confluence of warm, humid air from the southwest; cool, dry air from the north; and the moderating influence of the Atlantic Ocean to the east. Summers are typically hot and humid, while winters are cold, windy, and snowy. Snow typically falls from the second half of November into early April, with occasional falls in October; May snow is much rarer. The USDA classifies the city as straddling hardiness zones 5b and 6a.

The hottest month is July, with a 24-hour average of 70.2 °F (21.2 °C), while the coldest is January, at 24.1 °F (−4.4 °C). There are an average of only 3.5 days of highs at or above 90 °F (32 °C) and 4.1 nights of lows at or below 0 °F (−18 °C) per year, and periods of either extremes are rarely sustained. The all-time record high temperature is 102 °F (39 °C), recorded on July 4, 1911, the only 100 °F (38 °C) or greater temperature to date. The all-time record low temperature is −24 °F (−31 °C), recorded on February 16, 1943. The lowest daily maximum temperature on record is −2 °F (−19 °C) on January 8, 1968, while the highest daily minimum is 80 °F (27 °C) on July 4, 1911.

Worcester is known for being particularly snowy in the cold months, sometimes even experiencing intense autumn blizzards. The city averages 48.07 inches (1,220 mm) of precipitation a year, as well as an average of 64 inches (160 cm) of snowfall a season, receiving far more snow than coastal locations less than 40 miles (64 km) away. Massachusetts' geographic location, jutting out into the North Atlantic, as well as Worcester's elevation relative to the surrounding terrain, makes the city very prone to Nor'easter weather systems that can dump heavy snow on the region. Extreme winters have brought up to 120 inches (300 cm) of snowfall, as happened in 2005. In late January 2015, a blizzard traversed over the city as it shed almost 32 inches (81 cm) of snow. This was the highest single-day snowfall total for anywhere in Massachusetts since data collection began in 1892.

While rare, the city has had its share of extreme weather. On September 21, 1938, the city was hit by the brutal New England Hurricane of 1938. Fifteen years later, Worcester was hit by a tornado that killed 94 people. The deadliest tornado in New England history, it damaged a large part of the city and surrounding towns. It struck Assumption Preparatory School, now the site of Quinsigamond Community College.

Climate data for Worcester Regional Airport (elevation 1,000 feet (300 m)), 1991–2020 normals, extremes 1892–present
Month	Jan	Feb	Mar	Apr	May	Jun	Jul	Aug	Sep	Oct	Nov	Dec	Year
Record high °F (°C)	67 (19)	71 (22)	84 (29)	91 (33)	94 (34)	98 (37)	102 (39)	99 (37)	99 (37)	91 (33)	79 (26)	72 (22)	102 (39)
Mean maximum °F (°C)	55 (13)	54 (12)	64 (18)	78 (26)	85 (29)	88 (31)	90 (32)	88 (31)	84 (29)	75 (24)	66 (19)	58 (14)	91 (33)
Mean daily maximum °F (°C)	32.3 (0.2)	35.1 (1.7)	43.0 (6.1)	55.7 (13.2)	66.6 (19.2)	74.5 (23.6)	79.8 (26.6)	78.1 (25.6)	70.7 (21.5)	58.9 (14.9)	47.9 (8.8)	37.5 (3.1)	56.7 (13.7)
Daily mean °F (°C)	24.7 (−4.1)	27.0 (−2.8)	34.5 (1.4)	46.1 (7.8)	56.7 (13.7)	65.2 (18.4)	70.8 (21.6)	69.3 (20.7)	61.9 (16.6)	50.6 (10.3)	40.2 (4.6)	30.5 (−0.8)	48.1 (8.9)
Mean daily minimum °F (°C)	17.1 (−8.3)	18.9 (−7.3)	26.0 (−3.3)	36.5 (2.5)	46.8 (8.2)	55.9 (13.3)	61.7 (16.5)	60.5 (15.8)	53.2 (11.8)	42.2 (5.7)	32.5 (0.3)	23.4 (−4.8)	39.6 (4.2)
Mean minimum °F (°C)	−2 (−19)	1 (−17)	9 (−13)	25 (−4)	36 (2)	45 (7)	54 (12)	52 (11)	40 (4)	29 (−2)	18 (−8)	7 (−14)	−4 (−20)
Record low °F (°C)	−19 (−28)	−24 (−31)	−6 (−21)	9 (−13)	27 (−3)	33 (1)	41 (5)	38 (3)	27 (−3)	19 (−7)	3 (−16)	−17 (−27)	−24 (−31)
Average precipitation inches (mm)	3.52 (89)	3.26 (83)	4.19 (106)	4.08 (104)	3.56 (90)	4.22 (107)	3.93 (100)	4.14 (105)	4.24 (108)	4.84 (123)	4.00 (102)	4.28 (109)	48.26 (1,226)
Average snowfall inches (cm)	18.2 (46)	21.2 (54)	13.7 (35)	1.9 (4.8)	0.0 (0.0)	0.0 (0.0)	0.0 (0.0)	0.0 (0.0)	0.0 (0.0)	1.1 (2.8)	1.9 (4.8)	14.9 (38)	72.9 (185)
Average precipitation days (≥ 0.01 in)	12.2	10.9	12.4	12.6	13.2	11.8	11.0	10.3	9.5	11.5	10.8	12.2	138.4
Average snowy days (≥ 0.1 in)	7.5	7.6	4.9	1.2	0.0	0.0	0.0	0.0	0.0	0.3	1.0	5.6	28.1
Source: NOAA

=== Gallery ===
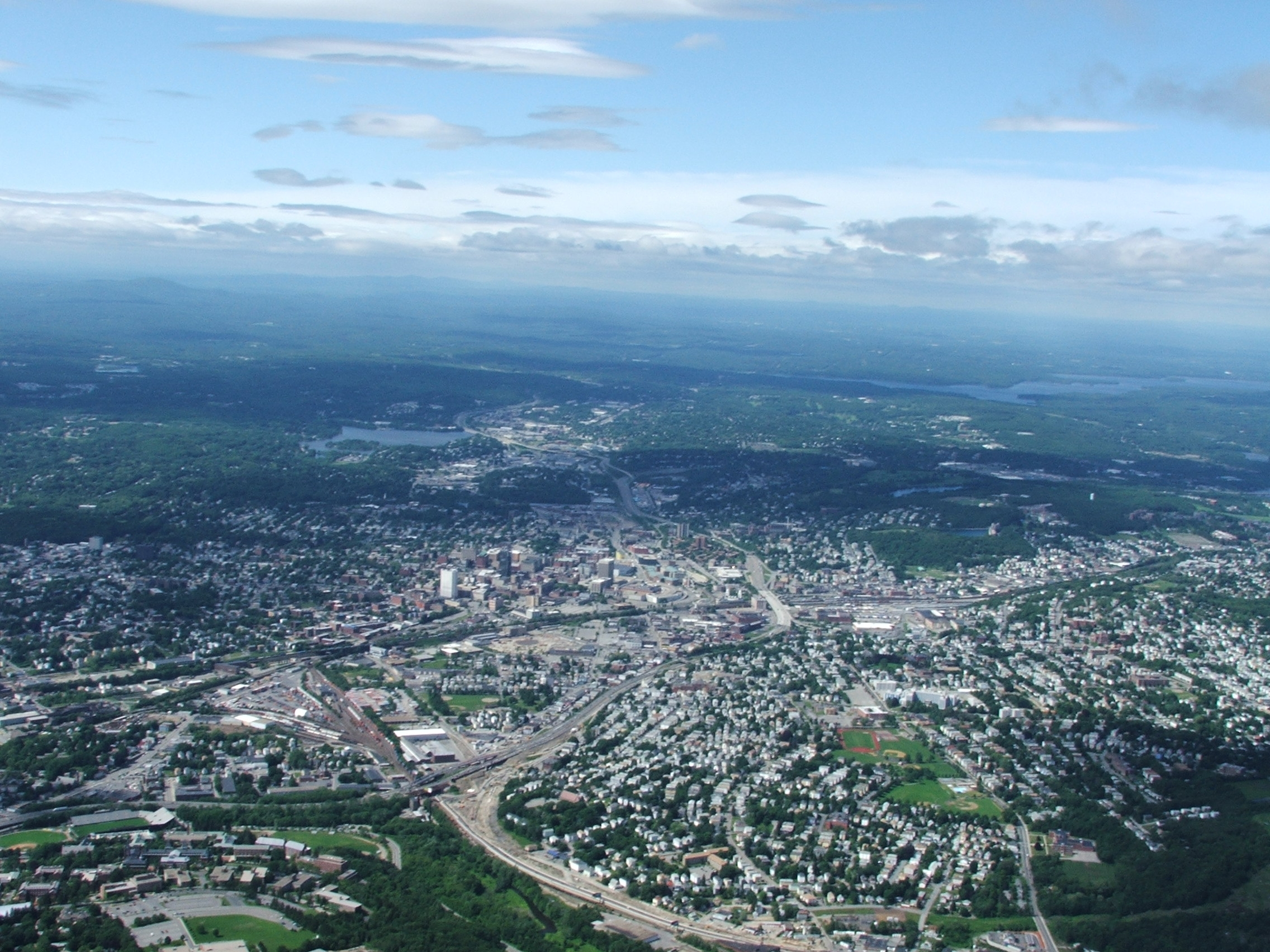
Worcester and the surrounding areas in 2006, looking north from 3,700 feet (1,100 m). Route 146 can be seen under construction.

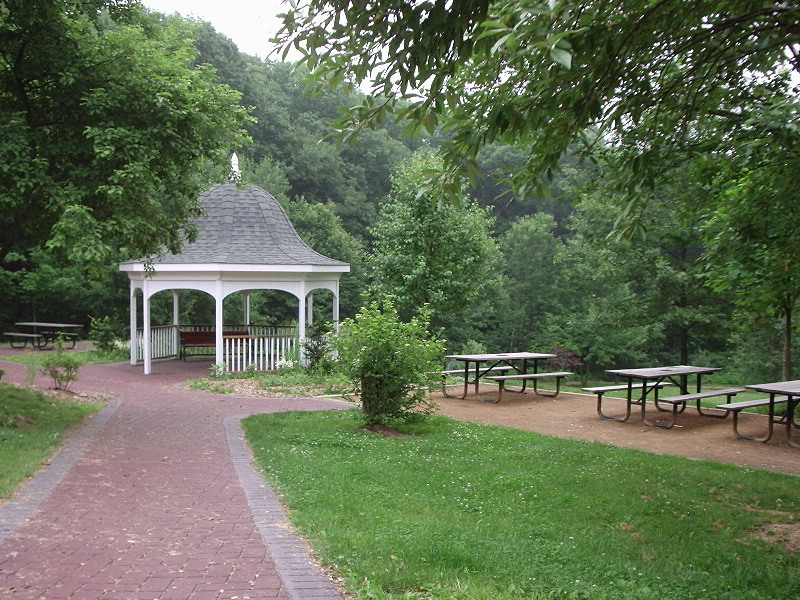
Dodge Park

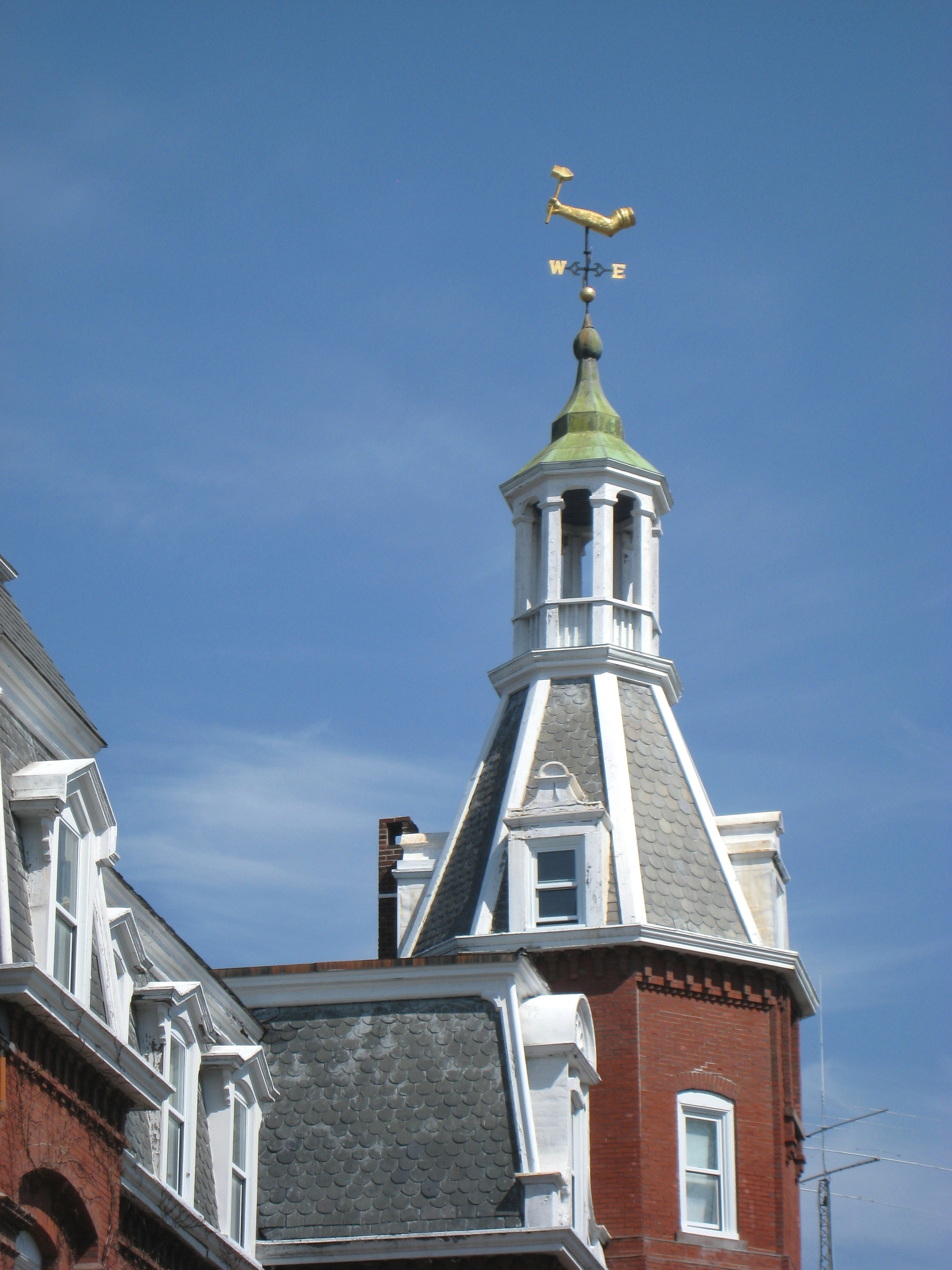
Washburn Shops, 1868

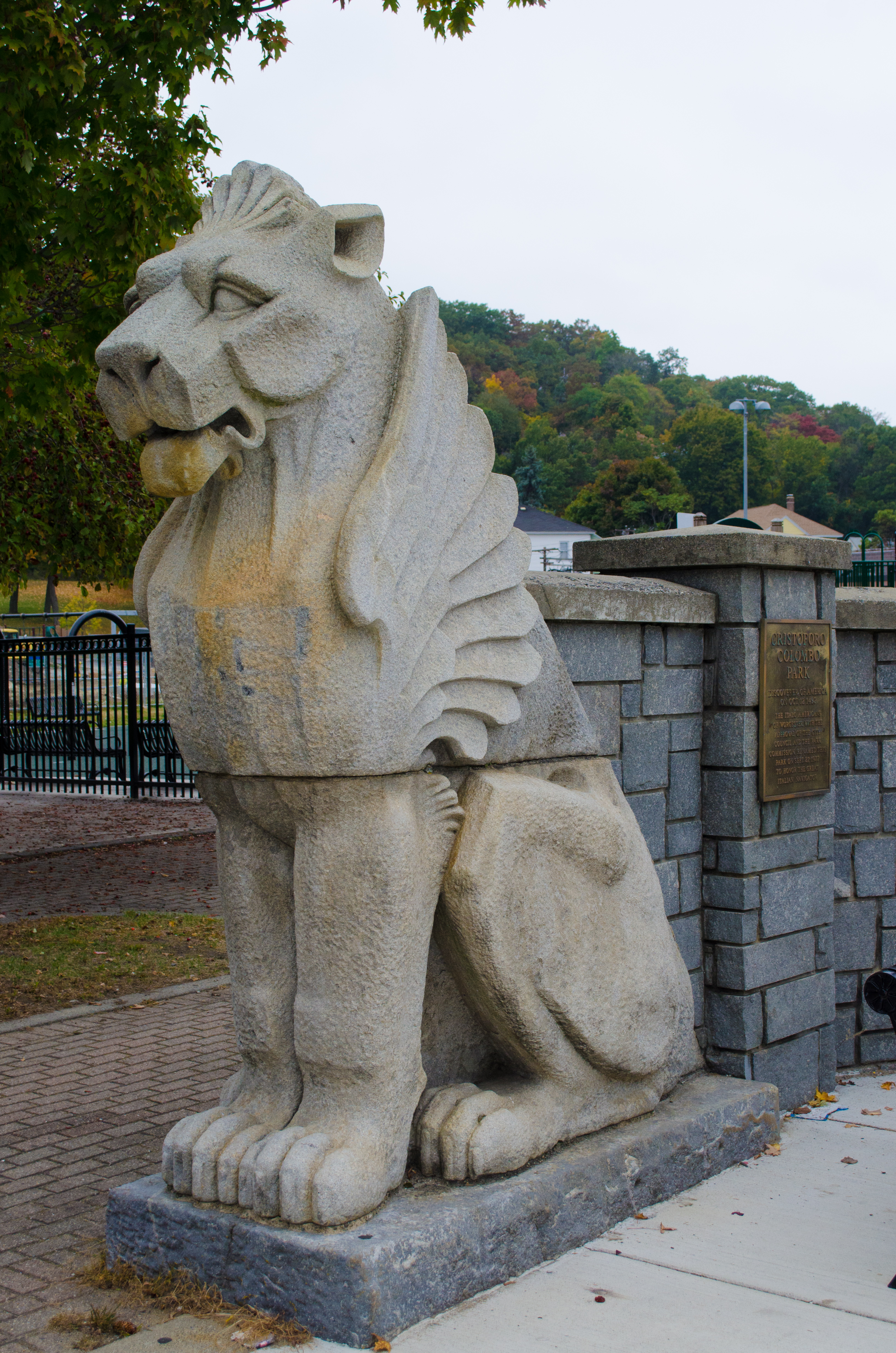
Cristoforo Colombo Park

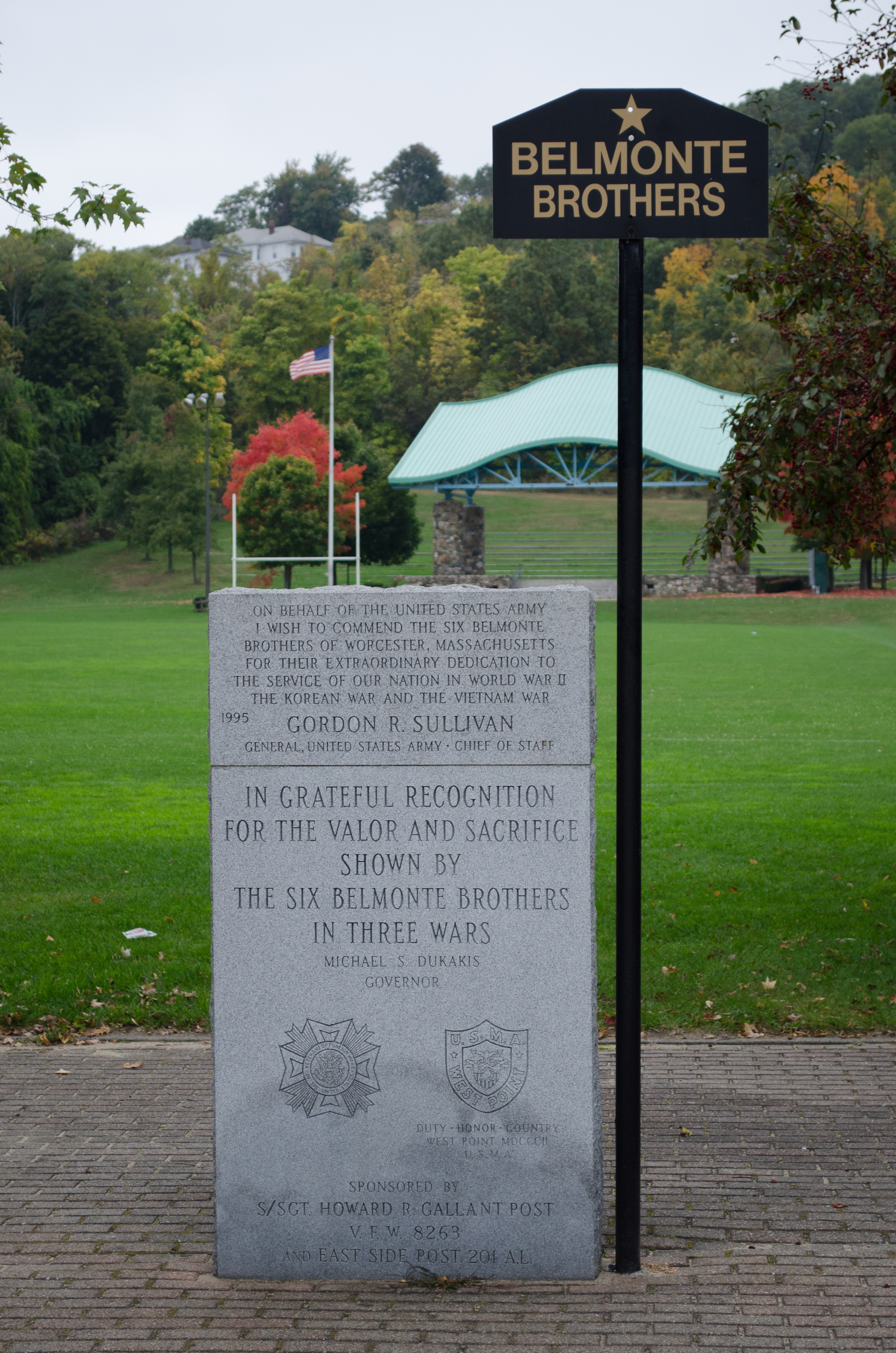
Cristoforo Colombo Park

== Demographics ==
Historical population
Year	Pop.	±%
1790	2,095	—
1800	2,411	+15.1%
1810	2,577	+6.9%
1820	2,962	+14.9%
1830	4,173	+40.9%
1840	7,497	+79.7%
1850	17,049	+127.4%
1860	24,960	+46.4%
1870	41,105	+64.7%
1880	58,291	+41.8%
1890	84,655	+45.2%
1900	118,421	+39.9%
1910	145,986	+23.3%
1920	179,754	+23.1%
1930	195,311	+8.7%
1940	193,694	−0.8%
1950	203,486	+5.1%
1960	186,587	−8.3%
1970	176,572	−5.4%
1980	161,799	−8.4%
1990	169,759	+4.9%
2000	172,648	+1.7%
2010	181,045	+4.9%
2020	206,518	+14.1%
2025	213,862	+3.6%

=== 2020 census ===
Worcester, Massachusetts – Racial and ethnic composition Note: the US Census treats Hispanic/Latino as an ethnic category. This table excludes Latinos from the racial categories and assigns them to a separate category. Hispanics/Latinos may be of any race.
Race / Ethnicity (NH = Non-Hispanic)	Pop 2000	Pop 2010	Pop 2020	% 2000	% 2010	% 2020
White alone (NH)	122,211	107,814	101,039	70.79%	59.55%	48.93%
Black or African American alone (NH)	10,762	18,501	28,378	6.23%	10.22%	13.74%
Native American or Alaska Native alone (NH)	550	427	336	0.32%	0.24%	0.16%
Asian alone (NH)	8,336	10,927	14,562	4.83%	6.04%	7.05%
Pacific Islander alone (NH)	48	52	48	0.03%	0.03%	0.02%
Some Other Race alone (NH)	824	1,289	2,642	0.48%	0.71%	1.28%
Mixed Race or Multi-Racial (NH)	3,762	4,217	8,777	2.18%	2.33%	4.25%
Hispanic or Latino (any race)	26,155	37,818	50,736	15.15%	20.89%	24.57%
Total	172,648	181,045	206,518	100.00%	100.00%	100.00%

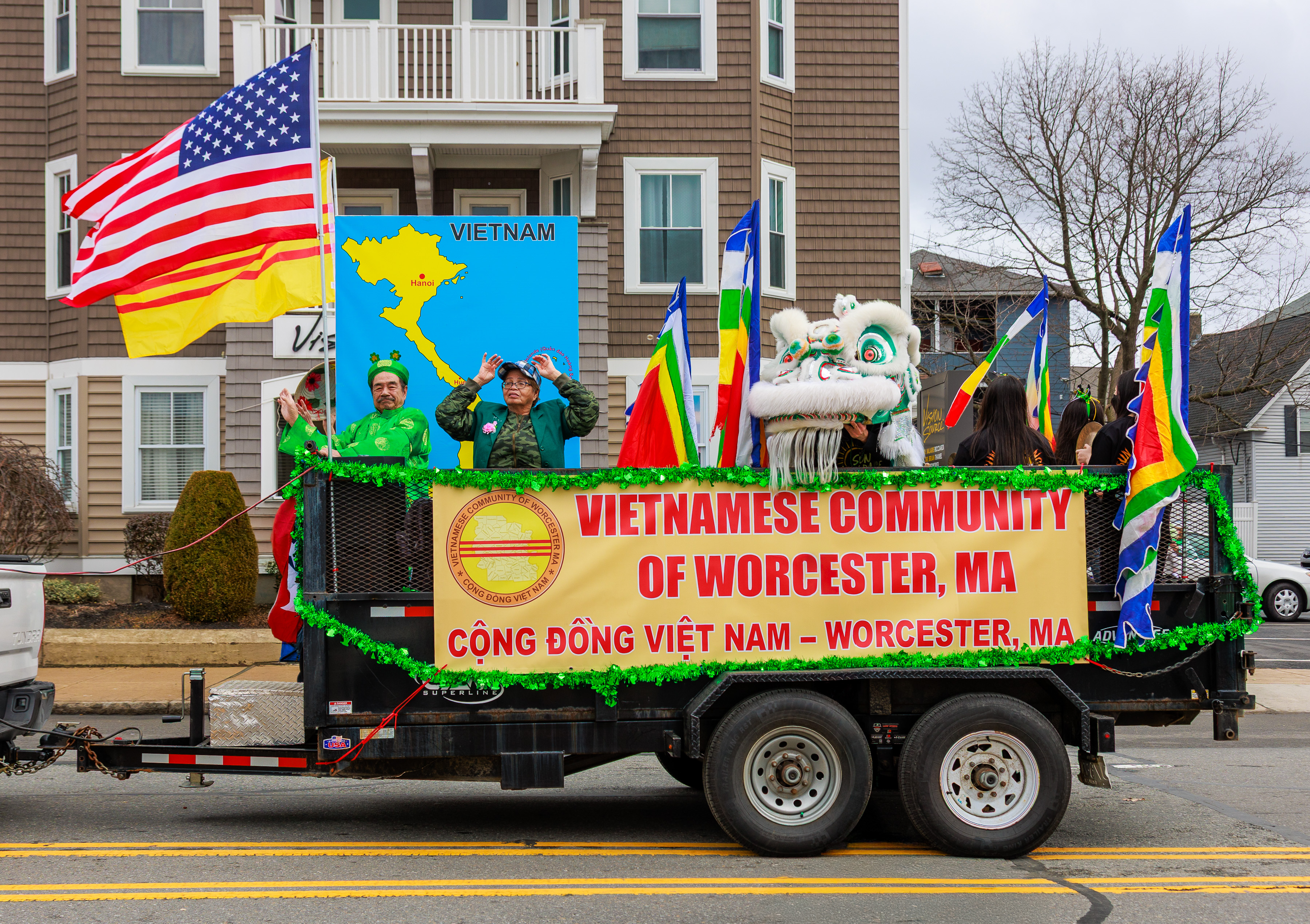
Vietnamese community float in the Worcester Saint Patrick's Day Parade

According to the 2020 U.S. Census, Worcester had a population of 206,518, of which 104,911 (50.8%) were female and 101,607 (49.2%) were male. In terms of age, 81.0% were over 18 years old and 13.6% were over 65 years old; children under 5 made up 5.2% of the city's population.

In the 2020 census, Worcester's racial composition was 53.3% White alone, 14.8% Black or African American alone, 0.5% American Indian and Alaska Native alone, 7.1% Asian alone, less than 0.1% Native Hawaiian and Other Pacific Islander alone, 12.9% some other race alone, and 11.3% two or more races. These racial categories include people of Hispanic or Latino origin. Hispanics and Latinos of any race made up 24.6% of the population (of whom nearly half were Puerto Rican). Non-Hispanic Whites were 48.93% of the population in 2020, down from 96.8% in 1970. In 2010, 19.7% of Worcester's population are below the poverty threshold.

Worcester is known for its diversity and large immigrant population, with significant communities of Vietnamese, Brazilians, Albanians, Puerto Ricans, Ghanaians, Dominicans, along with Chinese and Indian Americans. 22% of Worcester's population in 2018 was born outside the United States.

=== Income ===
From 2015 to 2024, the city's per capita income increased from $24,447 to $33,592, according to the city auditor. The data below is from the 2015–2019 American Community Survey 5-Year Estimates.

Rank	ZIP Code (ZCTA)	Per capita income	Median household income	Median family income	Population	Number of households
	Massachusetts	$43,761	$81,215	$103,126	6,850,553	2,617,497
	Worcester County	$37,574	$74,679	$96,393	824,772	309,951
1	01602	$36,792	$64,942	$87,092	22,900	9,498
2	01606	$35,354	$65,708	$82,592	19,896	8,159
	United States	$34,103	$62,843	$77,263	324,697,795	120,756,048
3	01609	$31,337	$45,992	$84,844	21,628	7,859
4	01604	$29,183	$55,665	$66,482	38,191	14,825
	Worcester	$27,884	$48,139	$63,893	185,143	71,595
5	01607	$25,319	$39,928	$66,875	8,167	3,702
6	01603	$24,415	$42,904	$56,630	19,731	7,327
7	01605	$23,003	$40,390	$46,641	28,533	10,673
8	01610	$18,452	$33,695	$39,928	22,023	7,729
9	01608	$17,598	$31,384	$30,077	4,471	1,916

== Economy ==
By the mid-19th century, Worcester was one of New England's largest manufacturing centers. The city's large industries specialized in machinery, wire production, and power looms. Although manufacturing has declined, the city still maintains large manufactures, like Norton Abrasives, which was bought by Saint-Gobain in 1990, Morgan Construction Company, since bought by Siemens and then bought by Japanese company PriMetals Technologies, and the David Clark Company. The David Clark Company pioneered aeronautical equipment including anti-gravity suits and noise attenuating headsets.

Services, particularly education and healthcare, make up a large portion of the city's economy. Worcester's many colleges and universities make higher education a considerable presence in the city's economy. Hanover Insurance was founded in 1852 and retains its headquarters in Worcester. Unum Insurance and Fallon Community Health Plan have offices in the city. Polar Beverages is the largest independent soft-drink bottler in the country and is in Worcester.

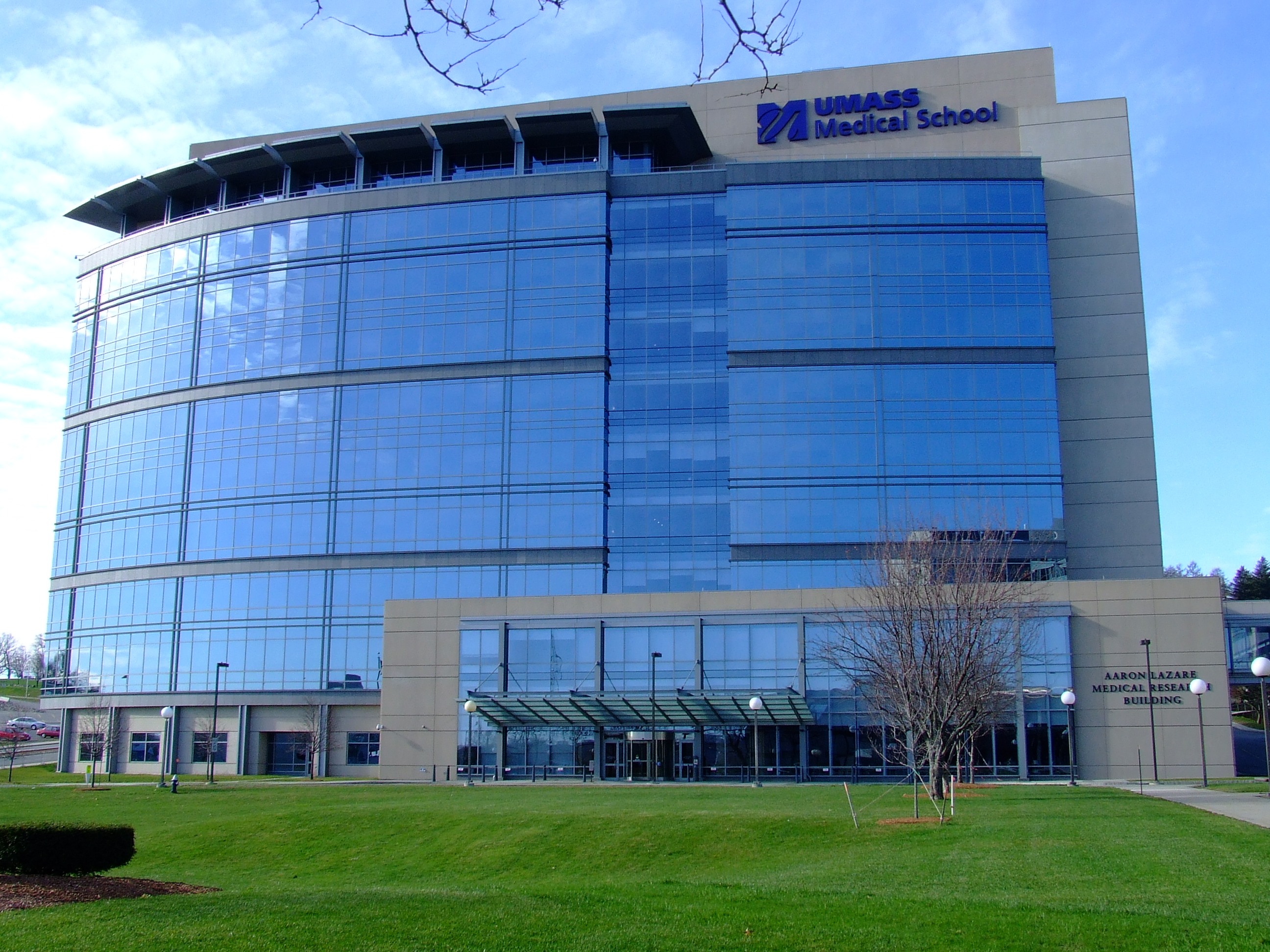
University of Massachusetts Medical School's Lazare Research Building

Worcester is home to the largest concentration of digital gaming students in the United States. The Memorial Auditorium, built as a tribute to World War I veterans of Worcester, is undergoing a renovation and may cater to these Digital Students as a future multimedia and digital center, in conjunction with Worcester's colleges and universities.

As one of the top ten emerging hubs for tech startups, the city's biotechnology and technology industries have helped spur major expansions at both the University of Massachusetts Medical School and Worcester Polytechnic Institute. The Massachusetts Biotechnology Research Park hosts many innovative companies including Advanced Cell Technology and AbbVie. The Worcester Foundation for Experimental Biology in nearby Shrewsbury developed the oral contraceptive pill in 1951.

Downtown Worcester used to boast major Boston retailers Filene's and Jordan Marsh as well Worcester's own department stores Barnard's and Denholm & McKay. Over time most retailers moved away from downtown and into the suburban Auburn Mall and Greendale Mall in North Worcester.

In 2010, the median household income was $61,212. Median family income was $76,485. About 7.7% of families and 10.8% of the population were below the poverty line, including 14.1% of those under age 18 and 7.5% of those age 65 or over. In October 2013, Worcester was found to be the number five city for investing in a rental property. From 2015 to 2024, the city's per capita income increased from $24,447 to $33,592, according to the city auditor.

In January 2017, Massachusetts Governor Charlie Baker signed a law allowing 44 acres of unused state-owned land on the former Worcester State Hospital campus to be converted into a biomanufacturing industrial park.

=== Top employers ===
According to the city's 2018 Comprehensive Annual Financial Report, the top ten employers in the city are:

#	Employer	# of employees
1	UMass Memorial Health Care	13,745
2	City of Worcester	5,473
3	University of Massachusetts Medical School	4,172
4	Reliant Medical Group	2,680
5	Saint Vincent Hospital	2,450
6	Hanover Insurance	1,800
7	Saint-Gobain	1,652
8	Seven Hills Foundation	1,445
9	Worcester Polytechnic Institute	1,283
10	Community Healthlink	1,200

== Arts and culture ==
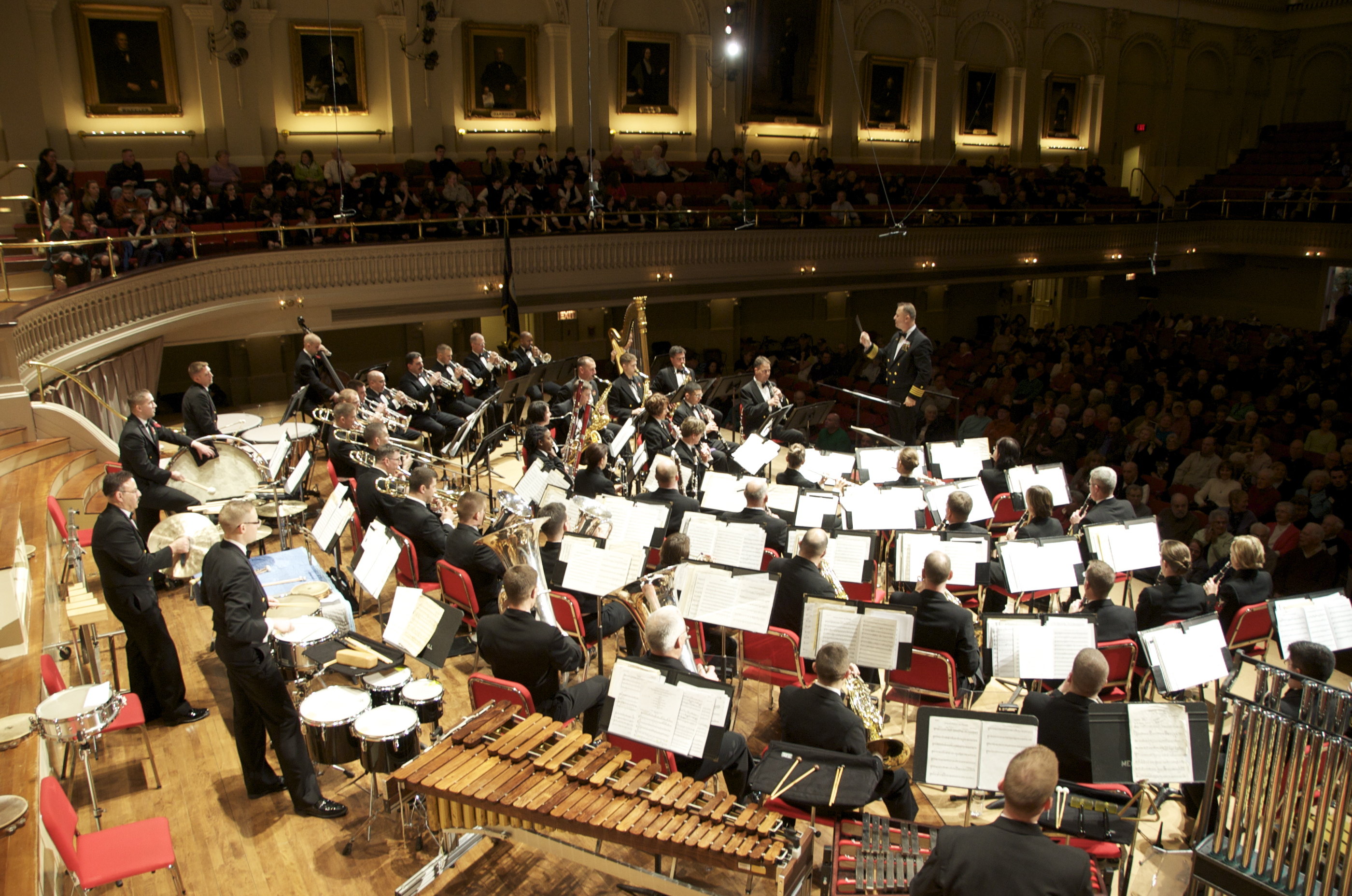
Mechanics Hall concert

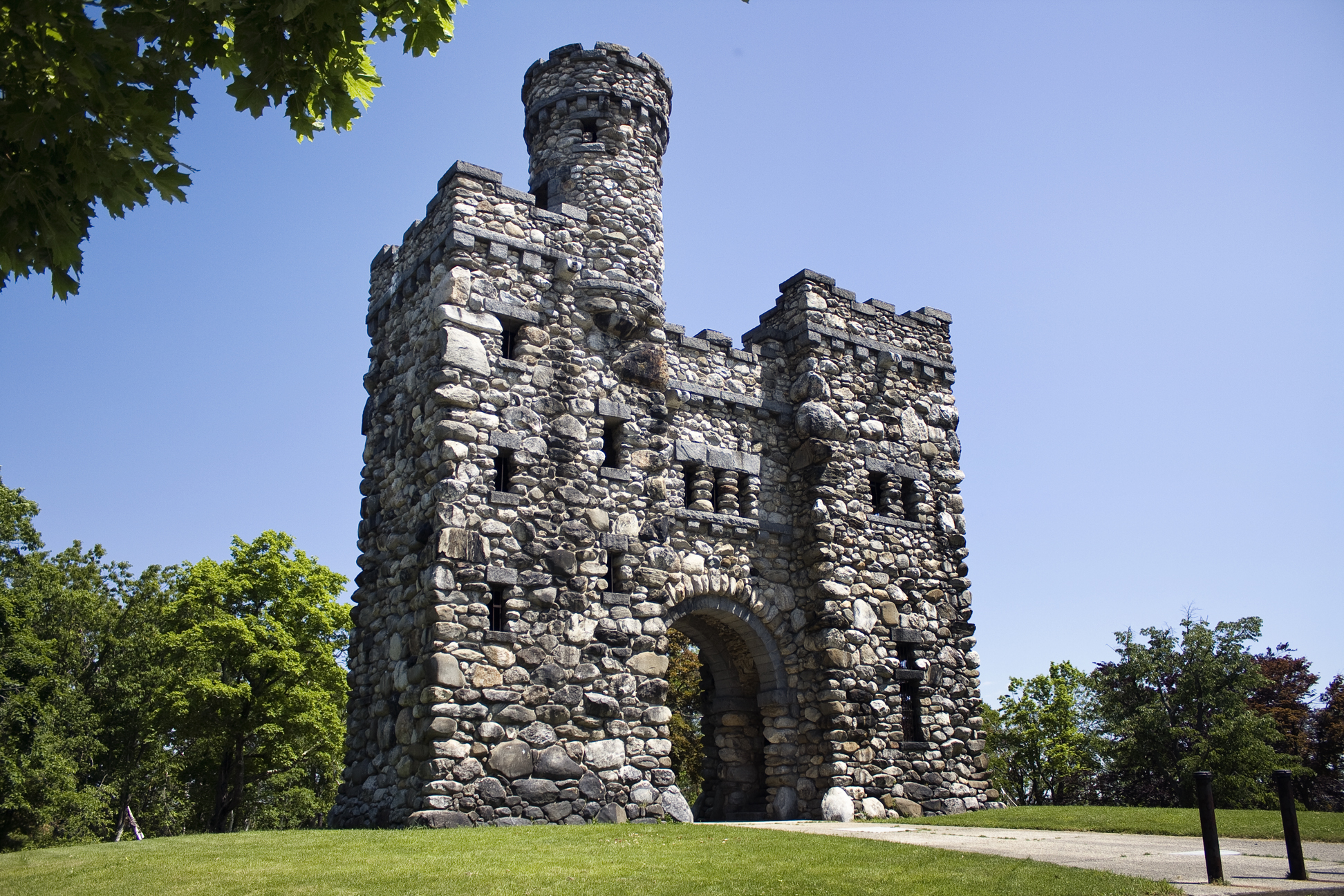
Bancroft Tower stands atop Bancroft Hill and was erected in 1900 by Stephen Salisbury III in honor of his childhood friendship with George Bancroft.

Much of Worcester's culture is synonymous with broader New England culture. The city's name is notoriously mispronounced by people unfamiliar with the city. As with the city in England, the first syllable of "cester" (castra) is left entirely unvoiced. Combined with a traditionally non-rhotic Eastern New England English accent, the name can be transcribed as "WOOS-tuh" or "WISS-tuh" (the first syllable possibly having a near-close central unrounded vowel).

Worcester has many traditionally ethnic neighborhoods, including Quinsigamond Village (Swedish), Shrewsbury Street (Italian), Kelley Square (Irish and Polish), Vernon Hill (Lithuanian), Union Hill (Jewish), and Main South (Puerto Rican, Dominican, and Vietnamese).

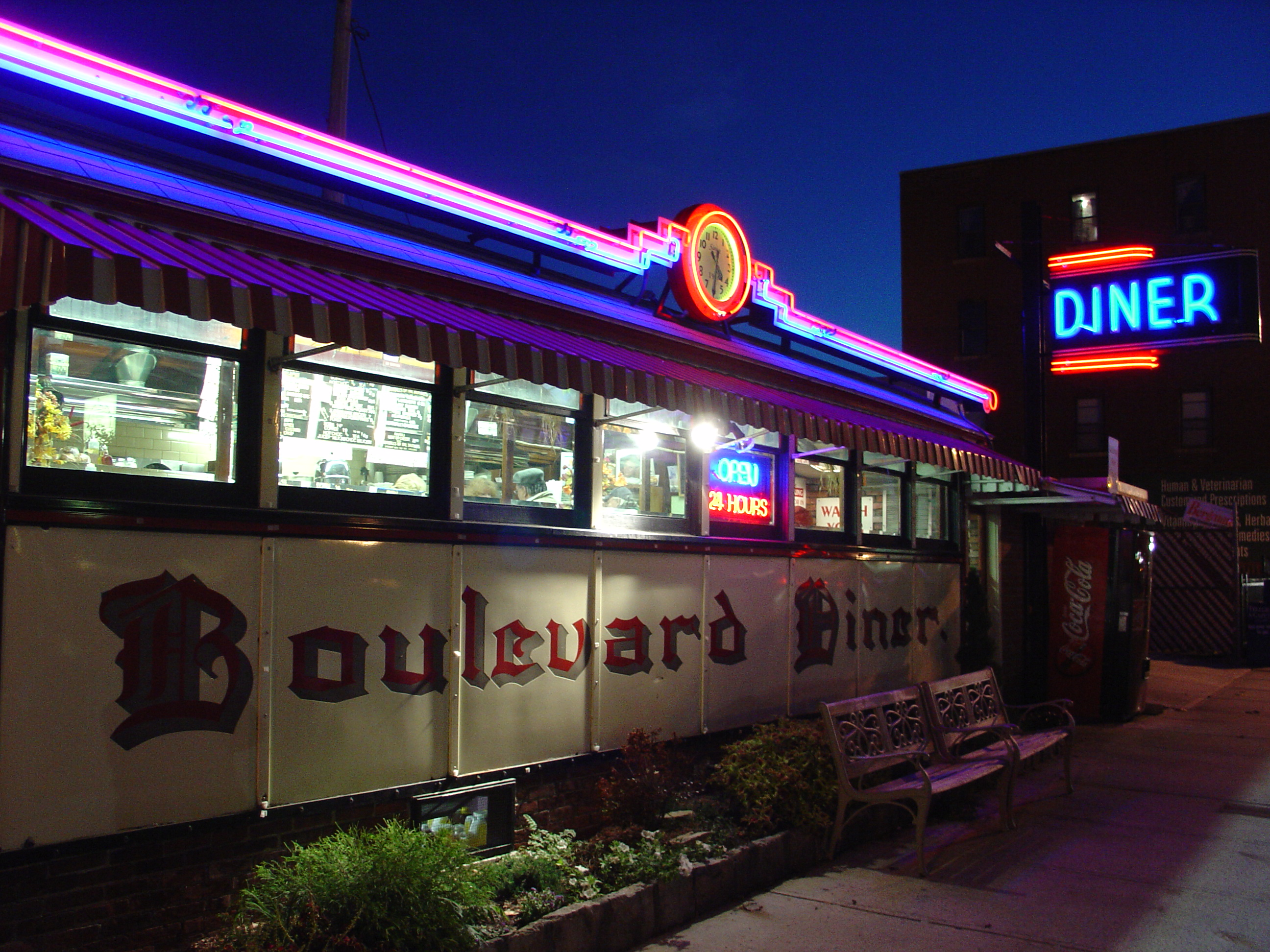
Boulevard Diner

Shrewsbury Street is Worcester's traditional "Little Italy" neighborhood and today boasts many of the city's most popular restaurants and nightlife. The Canal District was once an old Eastern European neighborhood, but has been redeveloped into a very popular bar, restaurant and club scene.

Worcester is also famously the former home of the Worcester Lunch Car Company. The company began in 1906 and built many famous lunch car diners in New England. Worcester is home to many classic lunch car diners, including Boulevard Diner, Corner Lunch, Chadwick Square Diner, and Miss Worcester Diner.

There are also many dedicated community organizations and art associations in the city. stART on the Street is an annual festival promoting local art. The Worcester Music Festival and New England Metal and Hardcore Festival are also held annually in Worcester. The Worcester County St. Patrick's Parade runs through Worcester and is one of the largest St. Patrick's Day celebrations in the state. The city also held the second oldest First Night celebration in the country each New Year's Eve until 2017. Since 1916, Worcester has also been the home of the Worcester Kiltie Pipe Band, one of the oldest pipe bands in the United States.

Worcester is also the state's largest center for the arts outside of Boston. Mechanics Hall, built in 1857, is one of the oldest concert halls in the country and is renowned for its pure acoustics. In 2008 the old Poli Palace Theatre reopened as the Hanover Theatre for the Performing Arts. The theatre brings many Broadway shows and nationally recognized performers to the city. Tuckerman Hall, designed by one of the country's earliest woman architects, Josephine Wright Chapman, is home to the Massachusetts Symphony Orchestra. The DCU Center arena and convention holds many large concerts, exhibitions and conventions in the city. The Worcester County Poetry Association sponsors readings by national and local poets in the city and the Worcester Center for Crafts provides craft education and skills to the community. Worcester is also home to the Worcester Youth Orchestras. Founded in 1947 by Harry Levenson, it is the 3rd oldest youth orchestra in the country and regularly performs at Mechanics Hall.

Mechanics Hall is also home to the Worcester Symphony Orchestra formerly known as the New England Symphony Orchestra. Founded in 1974 the Worcester Symphony Orchestra performs classical works regularly at Mechanics Hall in downtown Worcester.

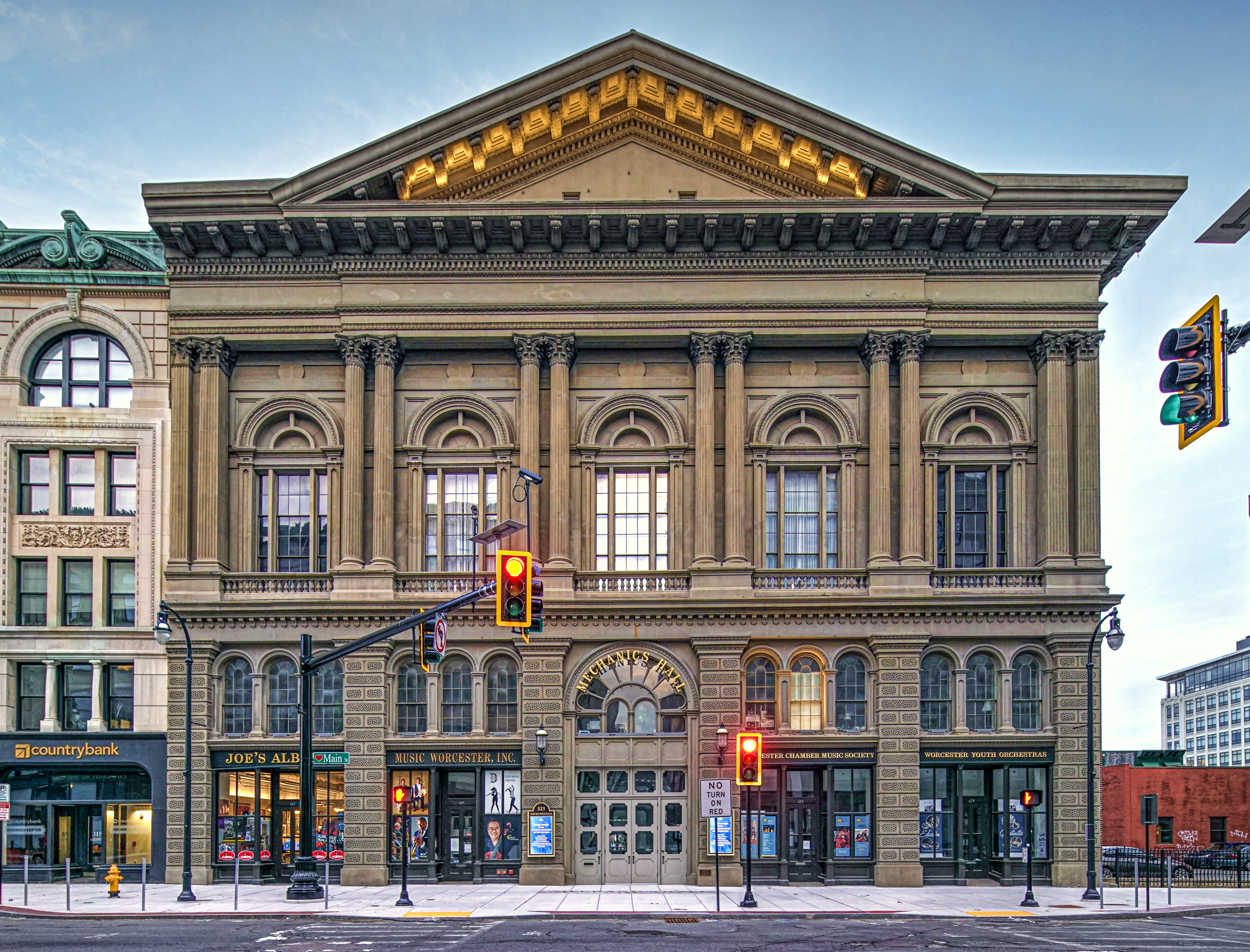
Mechanics Hall

The nickname "Wormtown" is synonymous with the city's once large underground rock music scene. The nickname has now become used to refer to the city itself.

Due to its location in Central Massachusetts, Worcester is known as the "Heart of the Commonwealth"; a heart is Worcester's official symbol. However, the heart symbol may also have its provenance in lore that the Valentine's Day card, although not invented in the city, was first mass-produced and popularized by Worcester resident Esther Howland. Similarly, the invention of the classic yellow "smiley face" design by Worcester native Harvey Ball has gained it an iconic status in the city. This design is now commonly seen in art and merchandise relating to Worcester, including murals, t-shirts and stickers.

=== Sites of interest ===
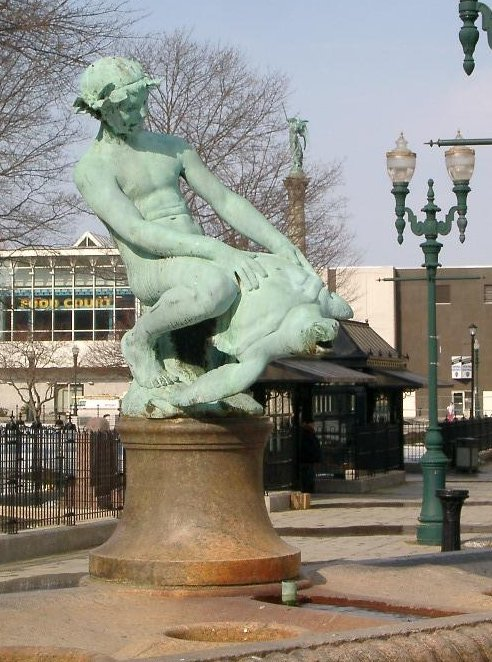
The Burnside Fountain, also known as the Turtle Boy statue, is a local landmark on the Worcester Common.

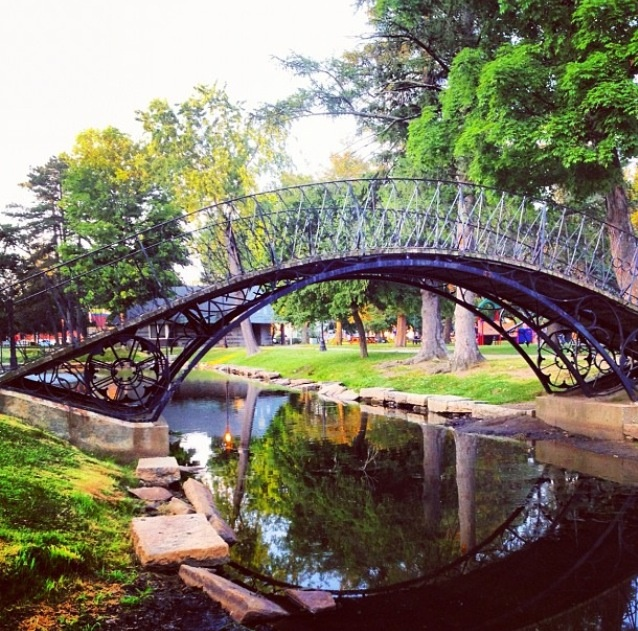
The Elm Park Iron Bridge

Worcester has 1,200 acres (490 ha) of publicly owned property. Notable parks include Elm Park, whose land was purchased in 1854 and whose later improvements were directed by the Olmsted Brothers from 1910 to 1918, and the City Common laid out in 1669. Both parks are listed on the National Register of Historic Places. The largest park in the city is the 549-acre Green Hill Park (222 ha). The park was purchased from the Green family in 1905, with the family contributing $50,000 toward the $104,000 purchase price. It includes the Green Hill Park Shelter built in 1910. In 2002, the Massachusetts Vietnam Veterans Memorial was dedicated in Green Hill Park. Other Parks, include Newton Hill, East Park, Morgan Park, Shore Park, Crompton Park, Hadwen Park, Institute Park and University Park. In 1840, Worcester resident Soloman Parsons bought around 300 acres (120 ha) of land in what is now Rattlesnake Hill. A follower of Millerism, Parsons believed the world would end in 1843 and purchased the land as a gift to God. The area is a hiking spot, although many of the paths are overgrown and is considered haunted by some residents. Though not within city limits, New England Botanic Garden at Tower Hill is operated by the Worcester County Horticultural Society and is a 20-minute drive northeast of the city in Boylston. The Horticultural Society's former headquarters became home to the Museum of Worcester, which adopted its present name in January 2025 and is dedicated to the city's history. As a former manufacturing center, Worcester has many historic 19th century buildings and on the National Register of Historic Places, including the old facilities of the Crompton Loom Works, Ashworth and Jones Factory and Worcester Corset Company Factory.

The American Antiquarian Society has been in Worcester since 1812. The national library and society has one of the largest collections of early American history in the world. The city's main museum is the Worcester Art Museum, founded in 1896 and opened to the public in 1898. The museum is the second largest art museum in New England, behind the Museum of Fine Arts in Boston. From 1931 to 2013, Worcester was home to the Higgins Armory Museum, which was the sole museum dedicated to arms and armor in the country. Its collection and endowment were transferred and integrated into the Worcester Art Museum, with a new home for the collection in the museum's Arms and Armor Galleries, which opened on November 22, 2025. The non-profit Veterans Inc. is headquartered at the southern tip of Grove Street in the historic Massachusetts National Guard Armory building.

The Worcester Memorial Auditorium is one of the most prominent buildings in the city. Built as a World War I war memorial in 1933, the multipurpose auditorium has hosted many of Worcester's concerts and sporting events, and is undergoing a renovation to become a multimedia and event center.

=== Religion ===
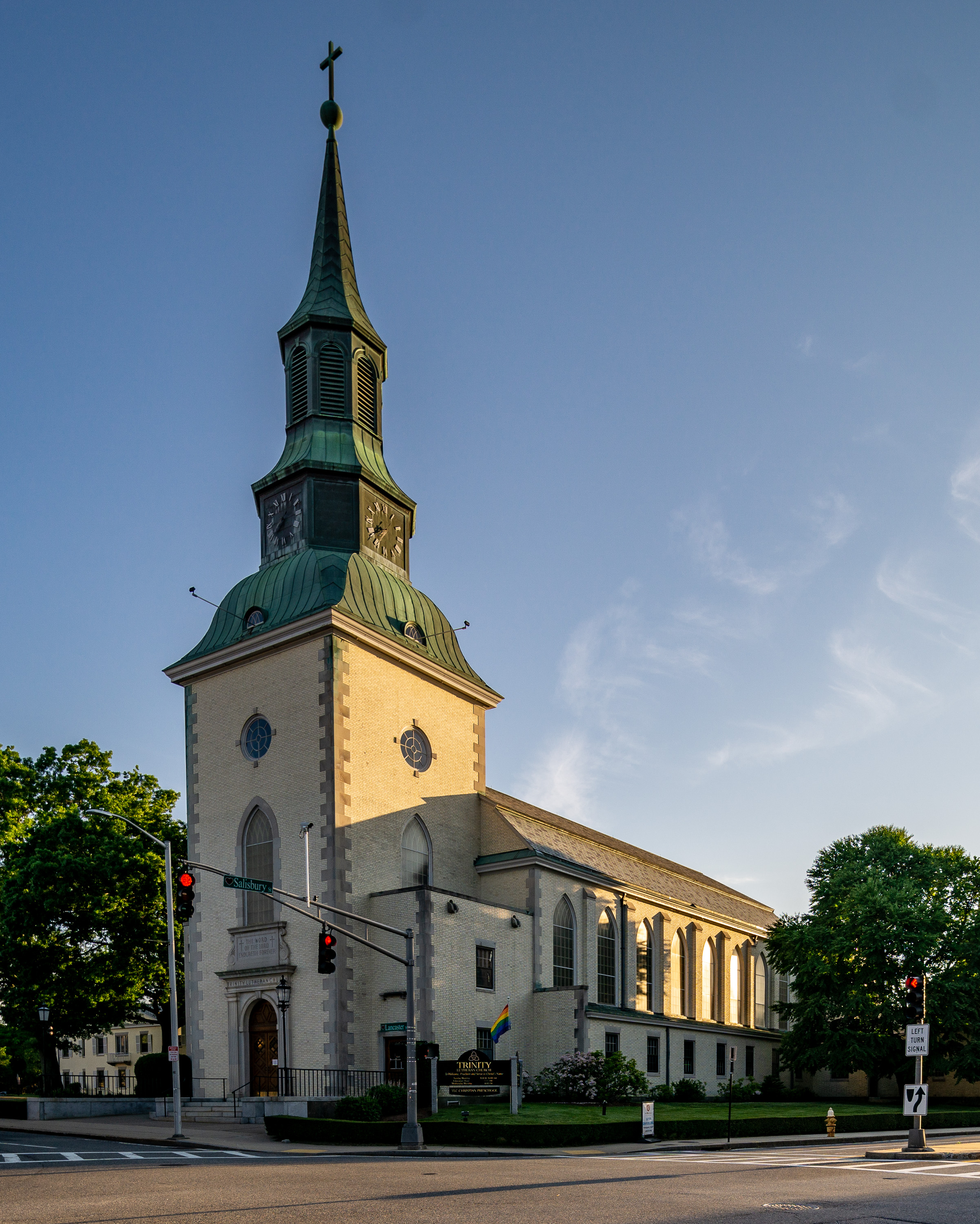
Trinity Lutheran Church

In the 2020 U.S. Religion Census, the Catholic Church had the largest reported number of adherents in Worcester County, at 278,698 (32.3% of the county's population). The study counts people associated with congregations rather than surveying residents' self-reported religious identities. The first Catholics came to Worcester in 1826. They were chiefly Irish immigrants brought to America by the builders of the Blackstone canal. As time went on and the number of Catholics increased, the community petitioned Bishop Fenwick to send them a priest. In response to this appeal, the bishop appointed the Reverend James Fitton to visit the Catholics of Worcester in 1834. A Catholic Mass was first offered in the city in an old stone building on Front Street. The foundation of Christ's Church, the first Catholic church in Worcester (now St. John's), was laid on July 6, 1834. The Roman Catholic Diocese of Worcester was canonically erected on January 14, 1950, by Pope Pius XII. Its territories were taken from the neighboring Diocese of Springfield. The fifth and current bishop is Robert Joseph McManus.

Religious Adherence Worcester County 2020
Religion	Number of adherents (2020)	Percentage (2020)	Number of adherents (2010)	Percentage (2010)	Change from 2010 to 2020
Catholic	278,698	32.3%	306,925	38.4%	-9%
Evangelical Protestant Christian	39,282	4.6%	37,511	4.7%	5%
Mainline Protestant Christian	29,886	3.5%	43,326	5.4%	-31%
Orthodox Christian	9,689	1.1%	7,935	1.0%	22%
Islam	6,184	0.7%	616	0.1%	904%
Jehovah's Witnesses	5,726	0.7%		0.0%	n/a
Buddhism	4,080	0.5%	7,051	0.9%	-42%
Judaism	10,210	1.2%	8,068	1.0%	26%
Hinduism	2,924	0.3%	1,151	0.1%	154%
Latter-day Saints	2,856	0.3%	2,772	0.3%	3%
Unitarian Universalist	2,325	0.3%	3,068	0.4%	-24%
Black Protestant	1,172	0.1%	497	0.1%	136%
Baha'i	205	0.0%	190	0.0%	8%
Zoroastrian			15	0.0%	-100%

The Unitarian-Universalist Church of Worcester was founded in 1841. Worcester's Greek Orthodox Cathedral, St. Spyridon, was founded in 1924.

The Islamic Society of Greater Worcester established Masjid Al-Arkham as the first mosque in Worcester with less than 50 congregants in 1979 at 57 Laurel Street in an abandoned church. As the congregation grew, the size of the original mosque no longer adequately met its needs. The community built the Worcester Islamic Center, also known as the Worcester Mosque, and moved there in 2005-07. After a period of renovations, Masjid Al-Arkham was re-opened in 2008.

Worcester is home to three Buddhist Centers: Boundless Way Zen Temple, Chua Pho Hien, and New England Buddhist Vihara & Meditation Center.

The small Worcester Baha'i Community has a long history, having been established in 1920. Prior to this, in 1912 'Abdu'l-Bahá, the son of Bahá'u'lláh and then leader of the Bahá'í Faith, visited the city and spoke at Clark University.

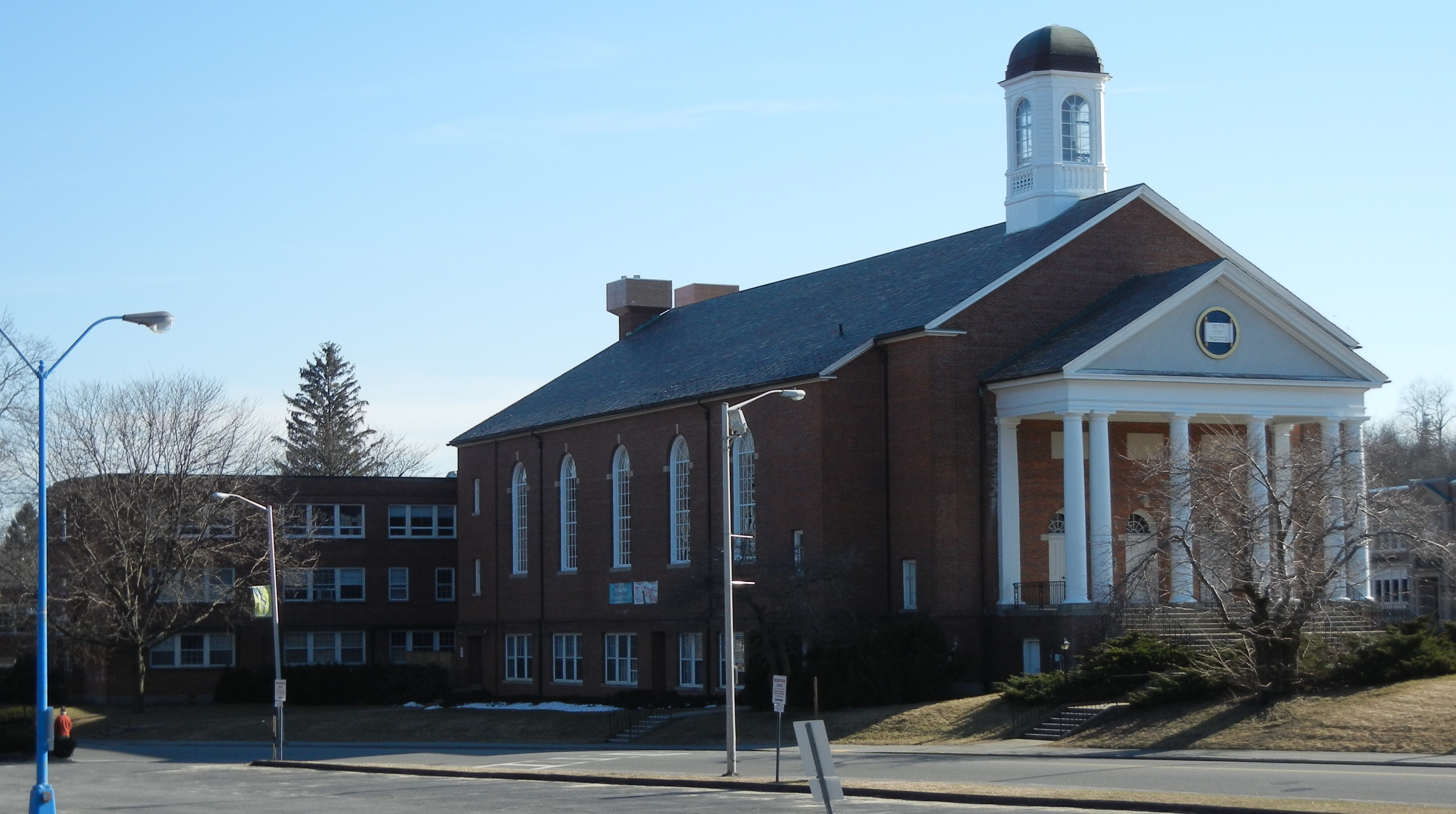
Temple Emanuel Sinai

Worcester is home to a Jewish population who attend five synagogues, including Reform congregation Temple Emanuel Sinai, Congregation Beth Israel, a Conservative synagogue founded in 1924, and Orthodox, Congregation Shaarai Torah West, Congregation Tifereth Israel – Sons of Jacob (Chabad), home of Yeshiva Achei Tmimim Academy, and The Torah Center. Beth Israel and its rabbi were the subject of the book And They Shall be My People: An American Rabbi and His Congregation by Paul Wilkes.

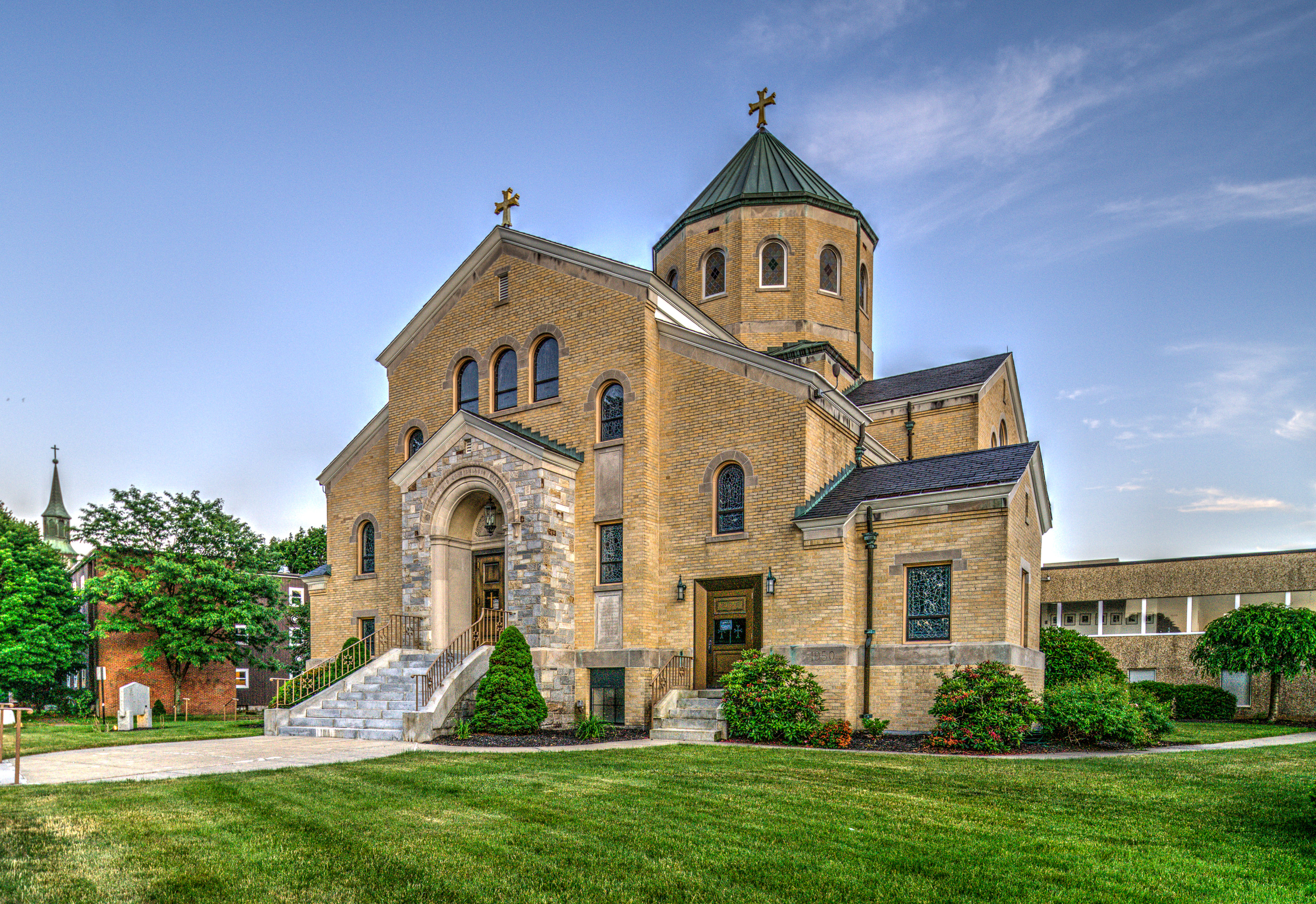
Armenian Church of Our Savior

The first Armenian Church in the Western Hemisphere was built in Worcester in 1890 and consecrated on January 18, 1891, as "Soorp Purgich" (Holy Savior). The current sanctuary of the congregation, now known as Armenian Church of Our Savior, was consecrated in 1952.

Worcester is home to America's largest community of Mandaeans, numbering around 2,500. Most Mandaeans in Worcester arrived as refugees from instability in Iraq during the early 21st century.

== Sports ==
Since 2021, Worcester has been the home of the Worcester Red Sox, the Triple-A affiliate of the Boston Red Sox. They play their home games at Polar Park. The city's former professional baseball team, the Worcester Tornadoes, started in 2005 and was a member of the Canadian-American Association of Professional Baseball League. The team played at the Hanover Insurance Park at Fitton Field on the campus of the College of the Holy Cross and was not affiliated with any major league team. The Tornadoes won the 2005 Can-Am League title. The team's owner ran into financial difficulties with the team disbanded after the 2012 season. The Worcester Bravehearts began play in 2014 as the local affiliate of the Futures Collegiate Baseball League, and won the league championship in their inaugural season.

The city hosts the Worcester Railers of the ECHL, which began play in October 2017. Prior to the Railers, the American Hockey League team Worcester Sharks played in Worcester from 2006 to 2015, before relocating to San Jose. The Sharks played at the DCU Center as a developmental team for the National Hockey League's San Jose Sharks. The AHL was formerly represented by the Worcester IceCats from 1994 to 2005. The IceCats were chiefly affiliated with the St. Louis Blues. The city hosted the Worcester Blades of the Canadian Women's Hockey League (CWHL) for one season, playing their 2018–19 home games in the Fidelity Bank Worcester Ice Center for that league's final season.

Worcester once hosted the Massachusetts Pirates, an indoor football team in the Indoor Football League starting in 2018 at the DCU Center. The team moved to the Tsongas Center in Lowell for the 2024 season. The city previously was home to the New England Surge of the defunct Continental Indoor Football League. The Worcester County Wildcats, part of the New England Football League, is a semi-pro football team and plays at Commerce Bank Field at Foley Stadium.

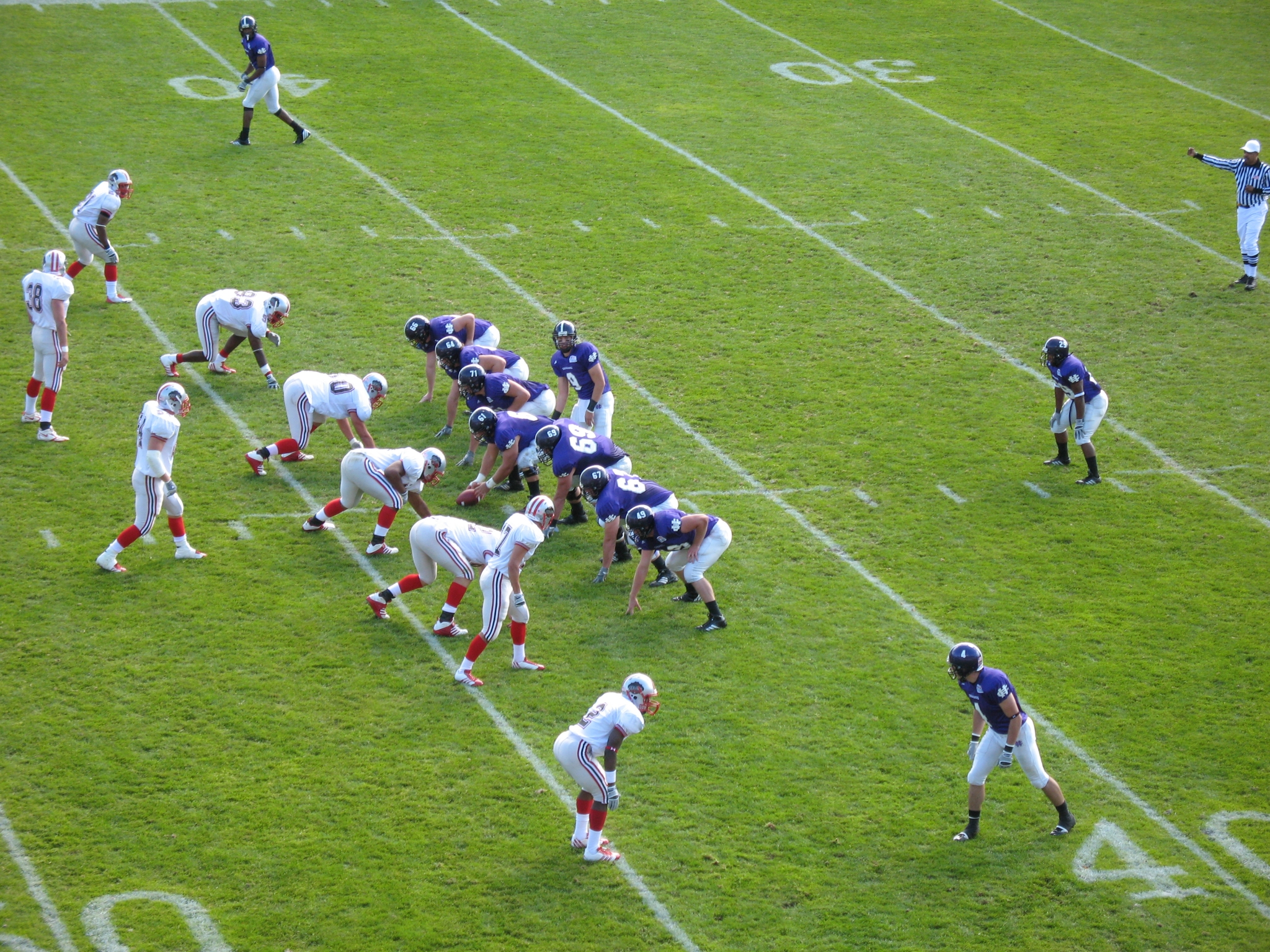
The College of the Holy Cross' football team (purple)

Worcester's colleges have long histories and many notable achievements in collegiate sports. The College of the Holy Cross represents NCAA Division 1 sports in Worcester. The other colleges and universities in Worcester are in Division II and Division III. The Holy Cross Crusaders won the NCAA men's basketball champions in 1947 and NIT men's basketball champions in 1954, led by future NBA hall-of-famers and Boston Celtic legends Bob Cousy and Tom Heinsohn.

Lake Quinsigamond is home to the Eastern Sprints, a premier rowing event in the United States. Competitive rowing teams first came to Lake Quinsigamond in 1857. Finding the long, narrow lake ideal for such crew meets, avid rowers established boating clubs on the lake's shores, the first being the Quinsigamond Boating Club. More boating clubs and races followed, and soon many colleges (local, national, and international) held regattas on the lake. Beginning in 1895, local high schools held crew races on the lake. The lake played host to the National Olympic rowing trials in 1952.

Worcester was home to Marshall Walter ("Major") Taylor, an African American cyclist who won the world one-mile (1.6 km) track cycling championship in 1899. Taylor's legacy includes being the first African American and the second black athlete to be a world champion (Canadian boxer George Dixon, who won a world title in 1890). Taylor was nicknamed the Worcester Whirlwind by the local papers.

Candlepin bowling was first played in Worcester in 1880.

Golf's Ryder Cup's first official tournament was played at the Worcester Country Club in 1927. The course also hosted the U.S. Open in 1925, and the U.S. Women's Open in 1960.

In 2002, the Jesse Burkett Little League all-stars team went all the way to the Little League World Series. They made it to the US final before losing to Owensboro, Kentucky. Jesse Burkett covers the West Side area of Worcester, along with Ted Williams Little League.

== Government ==
State government
State Representative(s):	Jim O'Day (D); David LeBoeuf (D); Dan Donahue (D); John Mahoney (D); Mary Keefe (D)
State Senator(s):	Robyn Kennedy (D-1st Worcester district) Michael O. Moore (D-2nd Worcester district)
Governor's Councilor(s):	Paul M. DePalo (D)
Federal government
U.S. Representative(s):	Jim McGovern (D-MA-02)
U.S. Senators:	Elizabeth Warren (D), Ed Markey (D)

Worcester is governed by a council–manager government, with a popularly elected mayor. A city council acts as the legislative body, and the council-appointed manager handles the traditional day-to-day chief executive functions.

City councilors can run as either a representative of a city district or as an at-large candidate. The winning at-large candidate who receives the greatest number of votes for mayor becomes the mayor (at-large councilor candidates must ask to be removed from the ballot for mayor if they do not want to be listed on the mayoral ballot). As a result, voters must vote for their mayoral candidate twice, once as an at-large councilor, and once as the mayor. The mayor has no more authority than other city councilors, but is the ceremonial head of the city and chair of the city council and school committee. Currently, there are 11 councilors: 6 at-large and 5 district.

Worcester's first charter, which went into effect in 1848, established a Mayor/Bicameral form of government. Together, the two chambers—the 11-member Board of Aldermen and the 30-member Common Council—were vested with complete legislative powers. The mayor handled all administrative departments, though appointments to those departments had to be approved by the two-chamber City Council.

Seeking to replace the 1848 charter, Worcester voters in November 1947 approved a change to Plan E municipal government. In effect from January 1949 until November 1985, this charter (as outlined in chapter 43 of the Massachusetts General Laws) established City Council/City Manager government. This type of governance, with modifications, has survived to the present day.

Initially, Plan E government in Worcester was organized as a 9-member council (all at-large), a ceremonial mayor elected from the council by the councilors, and a council-appointed city manager. The manager oversees the daily administration of the city, makes all appointments to city offices, and can be removed at any time by a majority vote of the council. The mayor chairs the city council and the school committee, and does not have the power to veto any vote.

From 1949 through 1959, elections were by the single transferable vote. Voters repealed that system in November 1960. Despite non-partisan elections, two groups alternated in control of council: the local Democratic Party and a slate known as the Citizens' Plan E Association (CEA). CEA members included the Republican Party leadership and other groups not affiliated with the regular Democratic Party.

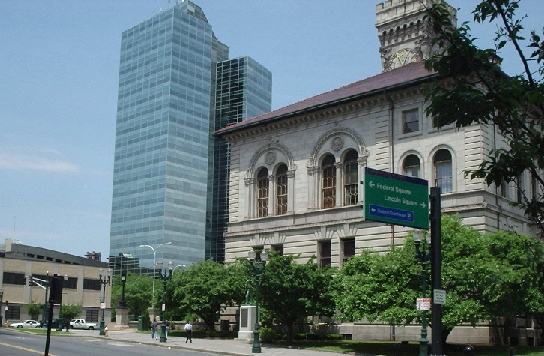
Downtown Worcester, with City Hall (built 1898) at right

In 1983, Worcester voters again decided to change the city charter. This "Home Rule" charter (named for the method of adoption of the charter) is similar to Plan E, the major changes being to the structure of the council and the election of the mayor. The 9-member Council became 11, 6 at-large and 1 from each city district. The mayor is chosen by popular election, but must also run and win as an at-large councilor. Worcester also has an elected school committee with slightly different districts than the city council. The mayor of Worcester serves as the chair of both boards.

=== Politics ===
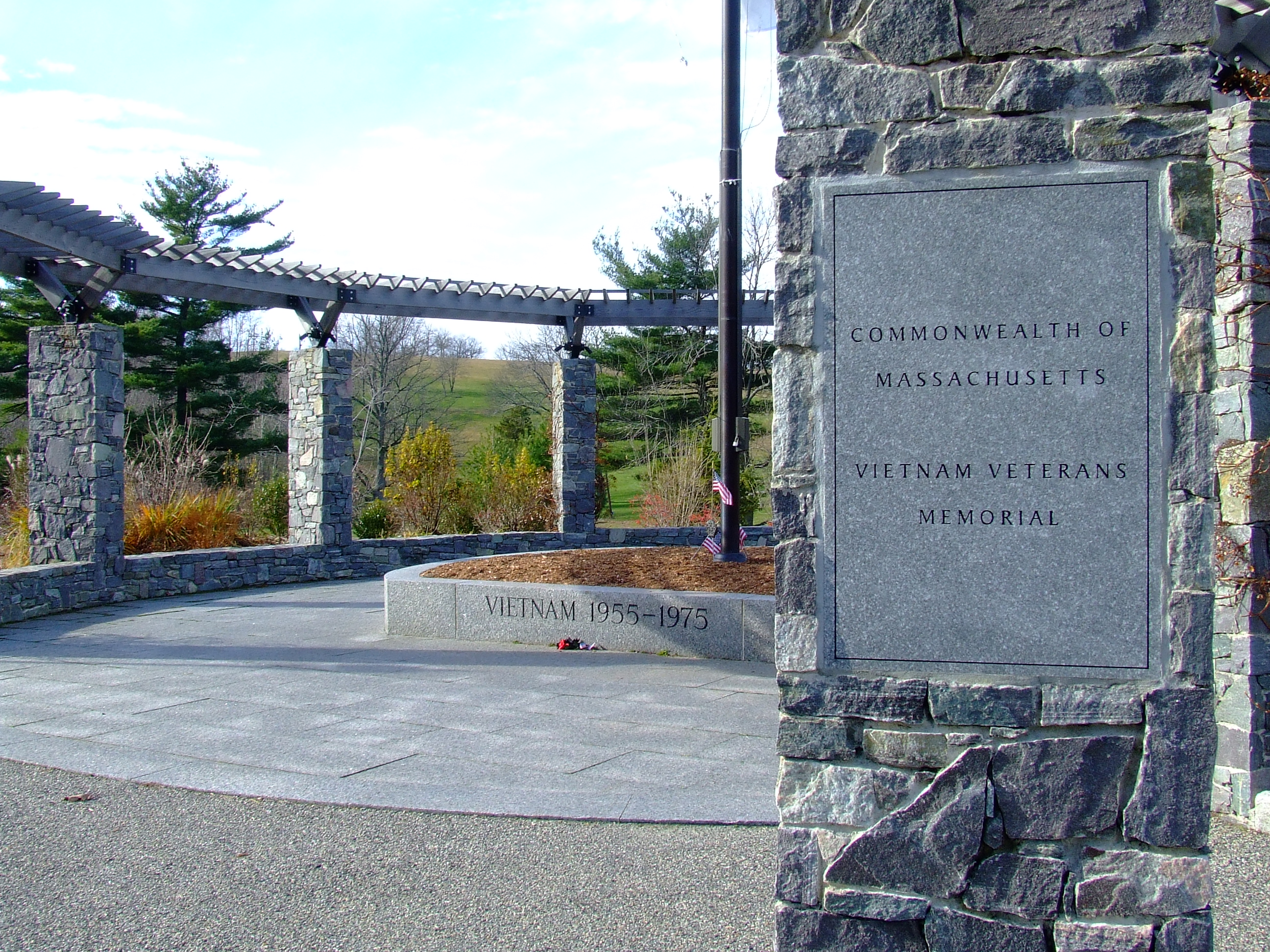
Massachusetts Vietnam Veterans' Memorial, erected in 2002

Worcester's history of social progressivism includes a number of temperance and abolitionist movements. It was a leader in the women's suffrage movement: The first national convention advocating women's rights was held in Worcester on October 23–24, 1850.

Two of the nation's most radical abolitionists, Abby Kelley Foster and her husband Stephen S. Foster, adopted Worcester as their home, as did Thomas Wentworth Higginson, the editor of The Atlantic Monthly and Emily Dickinson's avuncular correspondent, and Unitarian minister Rev. Edward Everett Hale.

The area was already home to Lucy Stone, Eli Thayer, and Samuel May Jr. They were joined in their political activities by networks of related Quaker families such as the Earles and the Chases, whose organizing efforts were crucial to the anti-slavery cause in central Massachusetts and throughout New England.

Anarchist Emma Goldman and two others opened an ice cream shop in 1892. "It was spring and not yet warm," Goldman later wrote, "but the coffee I brewed, our sandwiches, and dainty dishes were beginning to be appreciated. Within a short time, we were able to invest in a soda-water fountain and some lovely colored dishes."

On October 19, 1924, the largest gathering of the Ku Klux Klan (KKK) ever held in New England took place at the Agricultural Fairgrounds in Worcester. Klansmen in sheets and hoods, new Knights awaiting a mass induction ceremony, and supporters swelled the crowd to 15,000. The KKK had hired more than 400 "husky guards", but when the rally ended around midnight, a riot broke out. Klansmen's cars were stoned and burned, and their windows smashed. KKK members were pulled from their cars and beaten. Klansmen called for police protection, but the situation raged out of control for most of the night. After the violence, membership fell off, and no further public Klan meetings were held in Worcester.

Robert Stoddard, owner of The Telegram and Gazette, was one of the founders of the John Birch Society.

Sixties era radical Abbie Hoffman was born in Worcester in 1936 and spent more than half of his life in the city.

Voter registration and party enrollment as of February 1, 2025 – Worcester
Party	Number of voters	Percentage
Democratic	30,183	27.29%
Republican	7,055	6.38%
Unenrolled	72,095	65.19%
Political Designations	1,255	1.13%
Total	110,588	100%

Presidential election results
Year	Democratic	Republican
2024	62.4% 40,923	34.5% 22,598
2020	68.1% 48,584	29.7% 21,169
2016	65.9% 43,084	27.1% 17,732
2012	68.8% 42,210	29.2% 17,949
2008	67.4% 41,352	30.1% 18,474
2004	67.5% 38,264	31.1% 17,648
2000	65.6% 35,231	26.8% 14,402
1996	66.1% 35,607	23.9% 12,879
1992	53.6% 32,326	28.6% 17,228
1988	57.9% 34,369	41.1% 24,355
1984	54.2% 32,525	45.5% 27,348
1980	49.2% 31,146	36.8% 23,305

== Education ==
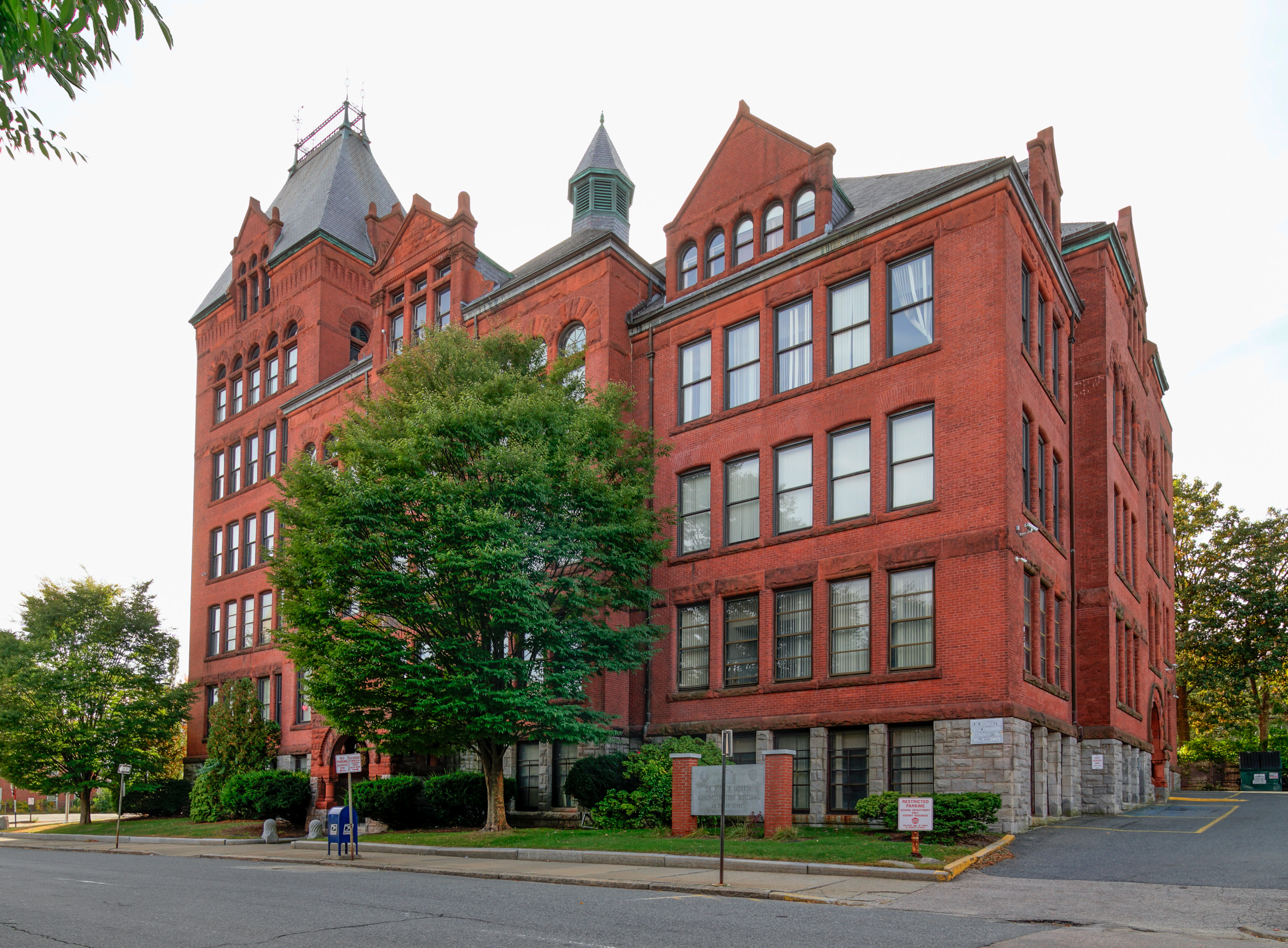
Durkin Administration Building

=== Primary and secondary education ===
Worcester Public Schools educate more than 25,000 students in pre-kindergarten through 12th grade. The system consists of 34 elementary schools, four middle schools, eight high schools, and several other learning centers such as magnet schools, alternative schools, and special education schools. The city's public school system also administers an adult education component called "Night Life", and operates a Public-access television cable TV station on channel 11.

Worcester Technical High School opened in 2006, replacing the old Worcester Vocational High School, or "Voke". The city's other public high schools include South High Community School, North High School, Doherty Memorial High School, Burncoat Senior High School, University Park Campus School, and Claremont Academy.

The Massachusetts Academy of Math and Science was founded in 1992 as a public secondary school at the Worcester Polytechnic Institute.

One notable charter school in the city is Abby Kelley Foster Charter Public School, which teaches kindergarten through 12th grade. It is granted status by Massachusetts as a Level 1 school. It is the one of 834 schools in the United States to offer the International Baccalaureate Diploma Programme.

Twenty-one private and parochial schools are also found throughout Worcester, including the city's oldest educational institution, Worcester Academy, founded in 1834, and Bancroft School, founded in 1900.

=== Higher education ===
Worcester is home to eight colleges and universities.

- Assumption University is the fourth oldest Roman Catholic college in New England and was founded in 1904. At 175 acres (0.71 km^{2}), it has the largest campus in Worcester.
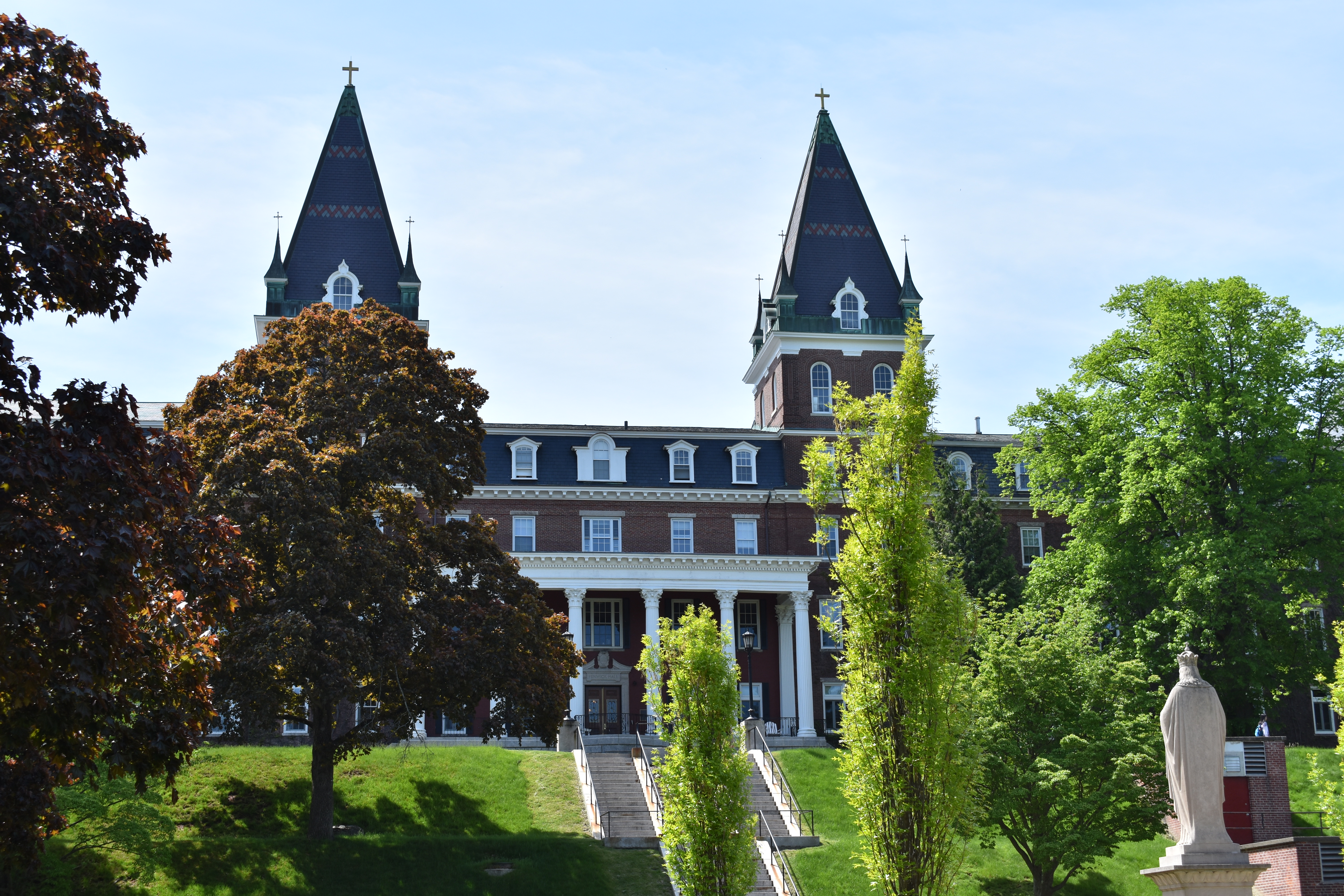
- Fenwick Hall, College of the Holy Cross
  Clark University was founded in 1887 as the first all-graduate school in the country; it now also educates undergraduates and is noted for its strengths in psychology and geography. Its first president was G. Stanley Hall, the founder of organized psychology as a science and profession, father of the child study movement, and founder of the American Psychological Association. Well-known professors include Albert A. Michelson, who became the first American Nobel laureate in science when he received the Nobel Prize in Physics in 1907. Robert H. Goddard, a pioneering rocket scientist of the space age also studied and taught here, and Sigmund Freud delivered his five famous "Clark Lectures" at the university, his only lectures within North America. Clark offers one of only two programs leading to a Ph.D. in Holocaust and Genocide Studies, the other is offered by Gratz College.
- College of the Holy Cross was founded in 1843 and is the oldest Roman Catholic college in New England and one of the oldest in the United States. Well-known graduates include Anthony Fauci, former director of the National Institute of Allergy and Infectious Diseases, Nobel laureate Joseph E. Murray; former Poet Laureate of the United States Billy Collins; Basketball Hall of Fame member Bob Cousy; attorney and professional sports' team owner Edward Bennett Williams; College Football Hall of Fame member Gordie Lockbaum; and Supreme Court Justice Clarence Thomas.
- The Massachusetts College of Pharmacy and Health Sciences Worcester Campus houses the institution's Doctor of Optometry program, accelerated Doctor of Pharmacy, Post-Baccalaureate Bachelor's in Nursing; Master's in Nursing – Family Nurse Practitioner, Master's program New England School of Acupuncture, as well as the Master's program in Physician Assistant Studies for post-baccalaureate students.
- Quinsigamond Community College was founded in 1963 and provides associate degree and professional certificate options to its 13,000 students per year. In addition to its main campus, students train and study at multiple program sites throughout Worcester as well as one in Marlborough and one in Southbridge.
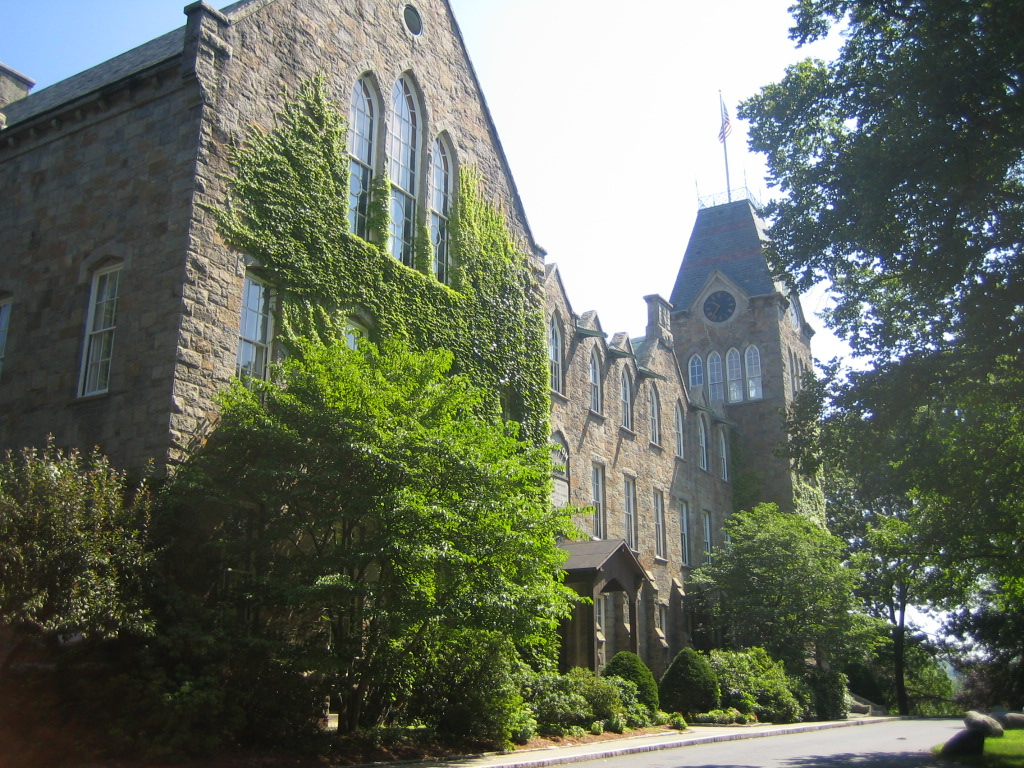
  Boynton Hall, 1868, designed by Worcester architect Stephen Earle, Worcester Polytechnic Institute
- The University of Massachusetts Medical School (1970) is one of the nation's top 50 medical schools. Craig Mello won the 2006 Nobel Prize for Medicine.
- Worcester Polytechnic Institute (WPI) is a private research university, focusing on the instruction and research of technical arts and applied sciences. Founded in 1865, WPI was one of the United States' first engineering and technology universities and now has 14 academic departments with over 50 undergraduate and graduate degree programs in science, engineering, technology, management, the social sciences, and the humanities and arts. Robert Goddard, the father of modern rocketry, graduated from WPI in 1908 with a Bachelor of Science in physics.
- Worcester State University (WSU) is a public liberal arts and sciences university located on the city's west side. Founded in 1874 as the State Normal School at Worcester, it was the fifth of nine public teacher training colleges in the commonwealth. Today WSU offers 34 undergraduate majors and 30 graduate programs and includes a student body of 6400.
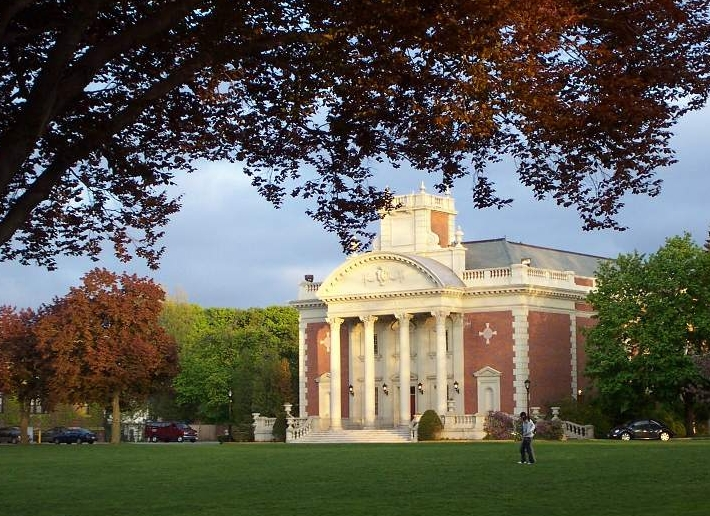
  Warner Memorial Theater, opened 1932, designed by Drew Eberson, Worcester Academy

Many of these institutions participate in the Colleges of Worcester Consortium. This independent, non-profit collegiate association includes academic institutions in Worcester and other communities in Worcester County, such as Anna Maria College in neighboring Paxton. It facilitates cooperation among the colleges and universities. One example of this being its inter-college shuttle bus and student cross registration. Worcester is also the home of Dynamy, a "residential internship program" in the United States. The organization was founded in 1969. The city is also home to many trade schools such as the Peterson School, Porter and Chester Institute, the Fieldstone School, and the Rob Roy Academy, among others. Additionally, the Worcester Technical High School offers adult education classes.

=== Defunct institutions ===
Becker College was a private college with campuses in Worcester and neighboring Leicester that closed at the end of the 2020–21 academic year. The college was formed in 1977 out of the merger of Leicester Junior College (Founded 1784 as Leicester Academy) and Becker Junior College (1887). Clark University started an equivalent program, Becker School of Design & Technology, hiring the majority of the faculty from the original program at Becker College and offering transfers to Becker students.

Worcester Junior College started as a private junior college in 1905 as a branch of Worcester Youth Men's Christian Association Institute, then its only offering was in auto mechanics. From 1926 to 1942 the college was affiliated with Northeastern University. In 1972 it was merged with the new Central New England College of Technology [CNEC].

The Oread Institute was an early women's college that closed its doors in 1881. Founded in 1849 by Eli Thayer it counted among its graduates the founders of Spelman College.

== Media ==
The Telegram & Gazette is Worcester's only daily newspaper. The paper, known locally as "the Telegram" or "the T and G", is wholly owned by GateHouse Media.

The commonwealth's UniMás station, WUTF-TV on channel 27, is licensed to Worcester but operates from Needham. The region's version of Spectrum News 1, which over the years has expanded from a community access channel to a regional cable news channel, is based in the city.

Radio stations based in Worcester include WCHC, WCUW, WSRS, WTAG, WWFX, WICN, WORC-FM and WXLO. WCCA-TV, on cable channel 194, provides Community Cable-Access Television and a live stream on the station's website.

== Infrastructure ==
=== Healthcare ===
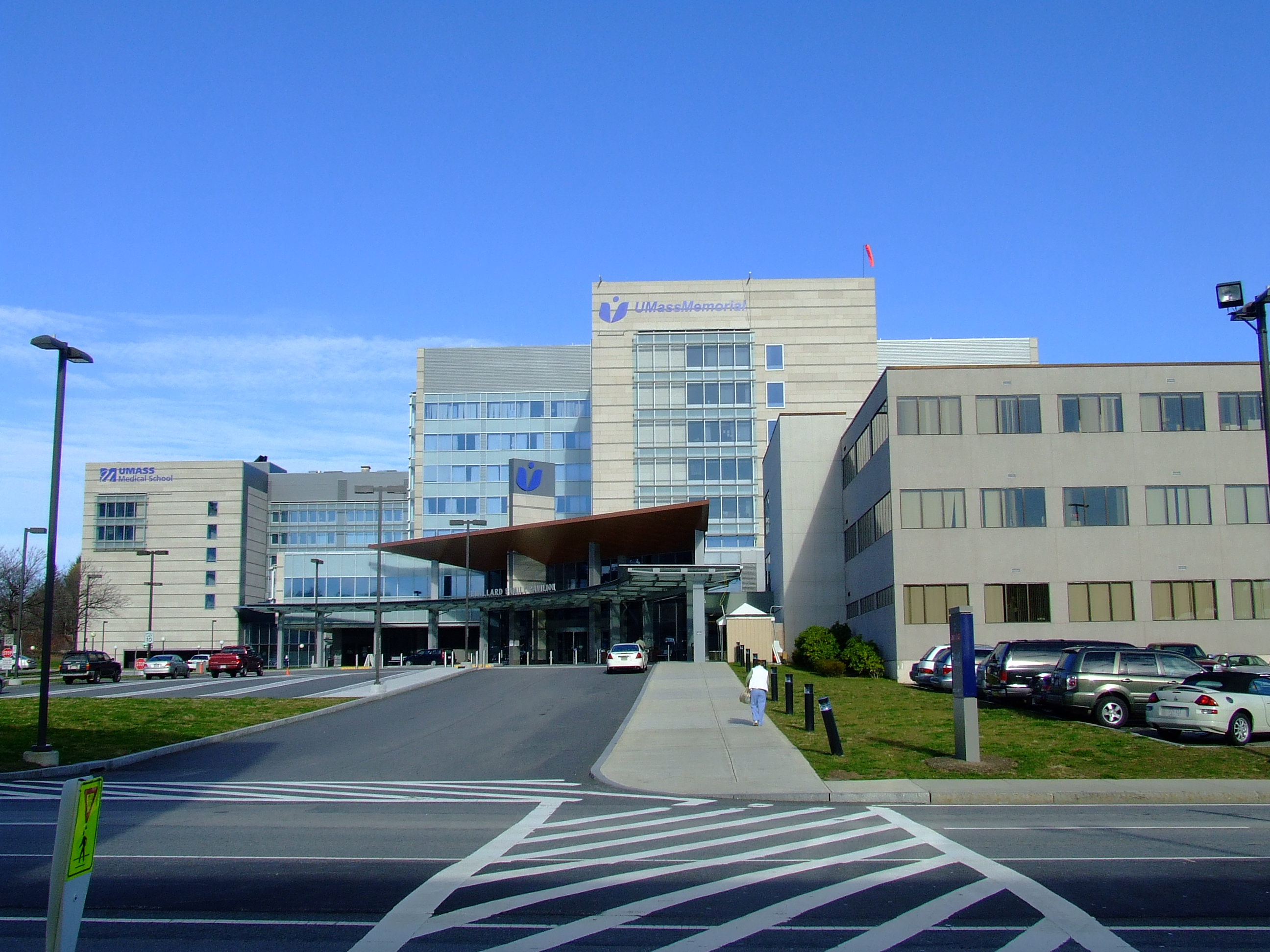
UMass-Worcester Medical School Hospital

In 1830, state legislation funded the creation of the Worcester State Insane Asylum Hospital (1833) which became one of the first new public asylums in the United States. Prior the Worcester State Insane Asylum hospital, all other treatment centers were funded by private philanthropists which neglected treatment for the poor.

The University of Massachusetts Medical School in Worcester is closely affiliated with UMass Memorial Health Care, the clinical partner of the medical school, which has expanded its locations all over Central Massachusetts. St. Vincent Hospital at Worcester Medical Center in the downtown area rounds out Worcester's primary care facilities. Reliant Medical Group, formerly Fallon Clinic, is the largest private multi-specialty group in central Massachusetts with over 30 different specialties. Affiliated with St. Vincent's Hospital, Reliant Medical Group was the creator of Fallon Community Health Plan, a now independent HMO based in Worcester and one of the largest in the state.

=== Public safety ===
For public safety needs, the city is protected by both the Worcester Fire Department and the Worcester Police Department.

UMass Memorial Medical Center provides emergency medical services (EMS) under contract with the city. Originally operated by Worcester City Hospital and later by the University of Massachusetts Medical School, "Worcester EMS" operates exclusively at the advanced life support (ALS) level, with two paramedics staffing each ambulance. UMass Memorial EMS maintains two community EMS stations and operates a fleet of 18 ambulances (including spares), as well as a special-operations trailer, several other support vehicles, and a bike team; the agency responds to an average of 100 emergencies each day. UMass Memorial EMS operates the EMS Communications Center, which is a secondary PSAP and provides emergency medical dispatch (EMD) services to Worcester and other communities.

=== Transportation ===
Worcester is served by several interstate highways. I-290 connects central Worcester to I-495 in Marlborough, and the Massachusetts Turnpike (I-90) and I-395 in nearby Auburn. I-190 links Worcester to Route 2 and the cities of Fitchburg and Leominster in northern Worcester County. The Massachusetts Turnpike can also be reached via a connecting segment of Route 146 from Providence.

Smaller state highways that serve Worcester include Route 9 which links the city to its eastern and western suburbs, Shrewsbury and Leicester, as well as Boston and Pittsfield. Route 12 was the primary route north to Leominster and Fitchburg until the completion of I-190, and was also a connection to Webster before I-395 was completed. Route 146, the Worcester-Providence Turnpike, connects the city with Providence, Rhode Island. Route 20, a coast-to-coast route connecting the Atlantic to the Pacific Ocean, touches the southernmost tip of Worcester near the Massachusetts Turnpike.

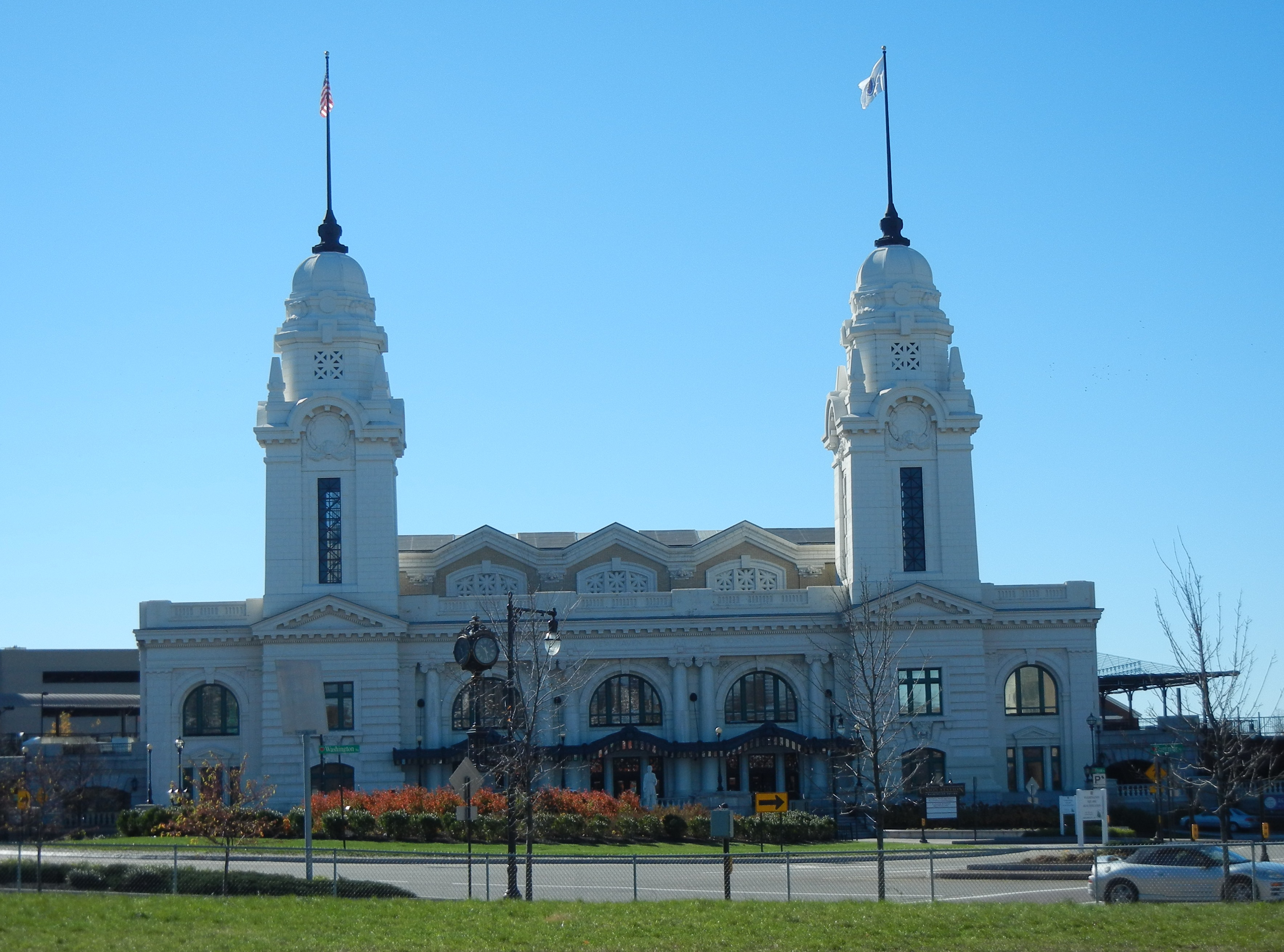
Union Station, 1911, designed by Watson & Huckel of Philadelphia

The city is the headquarters of the Providence and Worcester, a Class II railroad operating throughout much of southern New England. The city is a significant intermodal shipping hub for CSX's Boston Subdivision. Worcester is also the western terminus of the Framingham/Worcester commuter rail line run by the Massachusetts Bay Transportation Authority. Union Station, built in 1911 and reopened in 2000, serves as the hub for commuter railway traffic. It also serves as an Amtrak stop on the Lake Shore Limited from Boston to Chicago. In October 2008, the MBTA added five new trains to the Framingham/Worcester line as part of a plan to add 20 or more trains from Worcester to Boston and also to buy the track from CSX Transportation.

The Worcester Regional Transit Authority, or WRTA, manages the municipal bus system. Buses operate intracity as well as connect Worcester to surrounding central Massachusetts communities. Worcester buses became fare-free in 2020 amidst the COVID-19 pandemic and are scheduled to remain fare-free through June 2027. For intercity buses, the city is served by OurBus, Peter Pan Bus Lines and Greyhound Bus Lines, which operate out of Union Station.

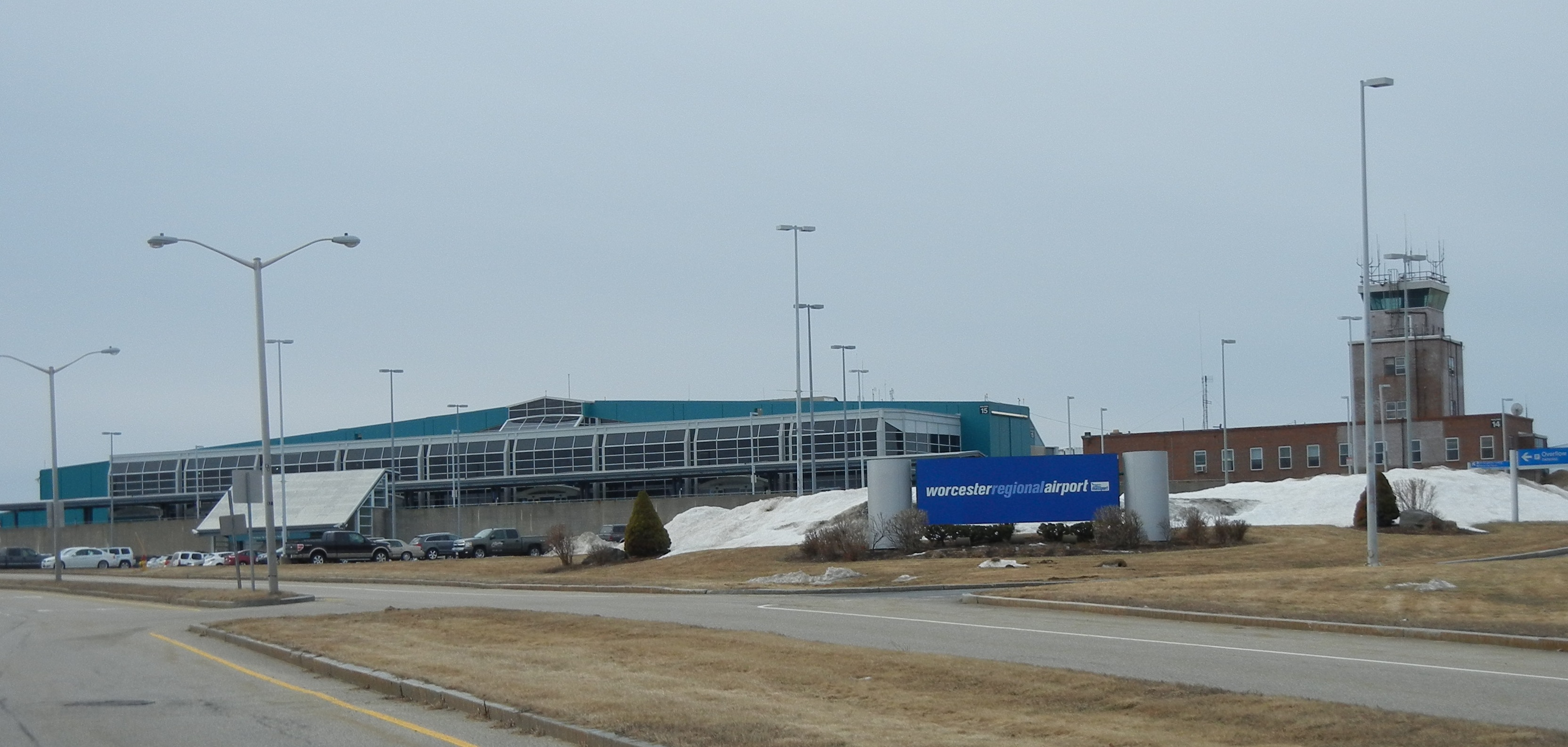
Worcester Regional Airport

Worcester Regional Airport, owned and operated by Massport since 2010, lies at the top of Worcester's highest point at Tatnuck Hill. The airport, which has two runways whose lengths are 7,000 ft (2,100 m) and 5,000 ft (1,500 m), is currently served by American Airlines, Delta Air Lines, and jetBlue.

=== Utilities and public services ===
Worcester has a municipally owned water supply. Its water filtration plant is located in Holden near two of the reservoirs. Sewage disposal services are provided by the Upper Blackstone Water Pollution Abatement District, which services the city as well as several surrounding communities.

National Grid USA is the exclusive distributor of electric power to the city, though due to deregulation, customers now have a choice of electric generation companies. Natural gas is distributed by NSTAR Gas; only commercial and industrial customers may choose an alternate natural gas supplier. Verizon is the primary wired telephone service provider for the area. Phone service is also available from various national wireless companies. Cable television is available from Charter Communications, with broadband Internet access also provided, while a variety of DSL providers and resellers are able to provide broadband Internet over Verizon-owned phone lines.

== Sister cities ==
Worcester has the following sister cities:

- Worcester, United Kingdom (1998)
- Piraeus, Greece (2005)
- Pushkin, Saint Petersburg, Russia (1987)
- Afula, Israel,

== See also ==
- Greater Worcester Land Trust
- List of mill towns in Massachusetts
- McCullen v. Coakley
- Worcester Public Library
- National Register of Historic Places listings in Worcester, Massachusetts
- USS Worcester, 3 ships
