= List of diners =

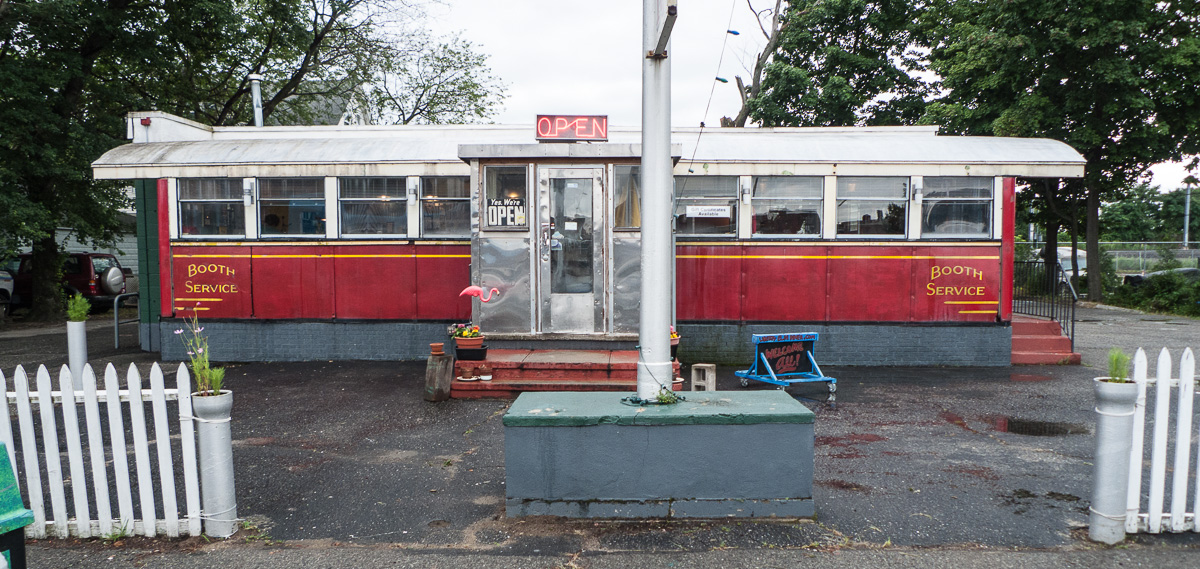
Central Diner (most recently Paula's Kitchen) in Providence, Rhode Island, was built in 1947, added to the U.S. NRHP in 2010, and closed in 2021.

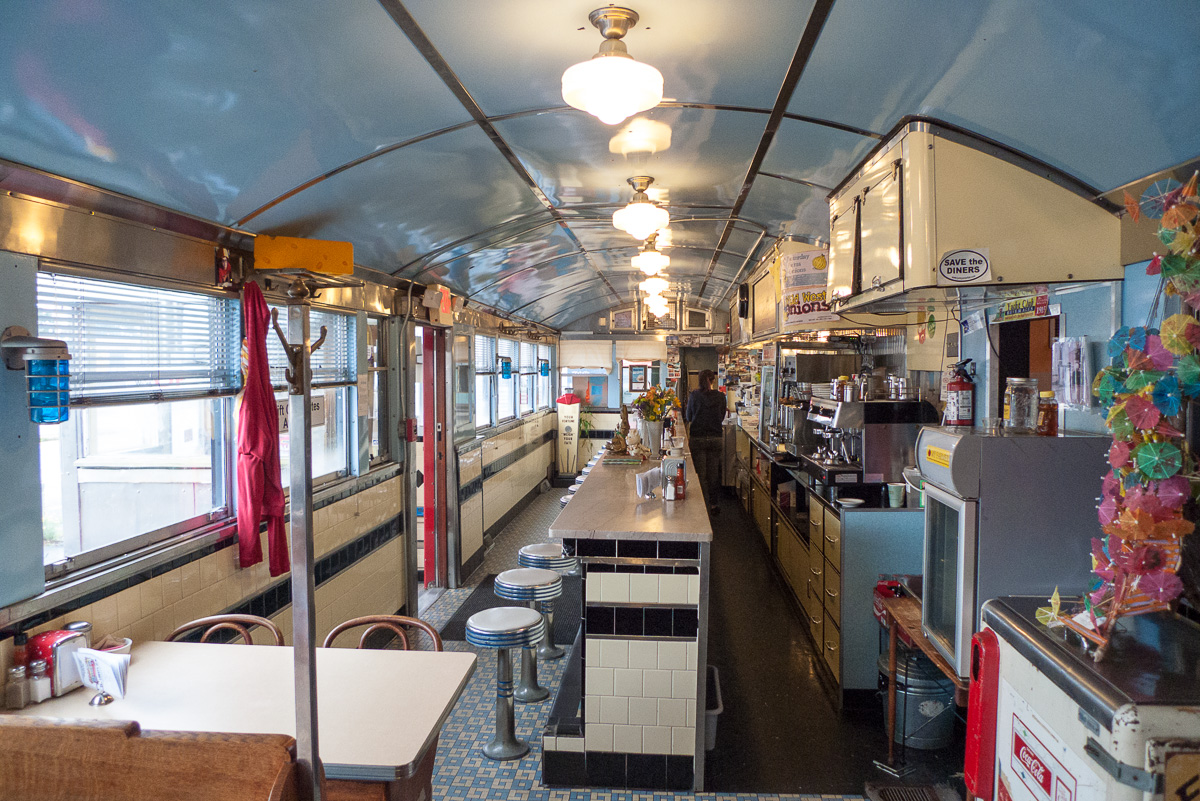
Interior of the Central Diner

This is a list of notable diners. A diner is a prefabricated restaurant building characteristic of American life. They are commonly found in New England, the Midwest, New York City, Pennsylvania, New Jersey, and in other areas of the Northeastern United States, but they are not limited to these areas; examples can be found throughout the United States, Canada and parts of Western Europe. Diners are characterized by offering a wide range of foods, mostly American, a casual atmosphere, a counter, and late operating hours. Diners commonly stay open 24 hours a day, especially in cities, making them an essential part of urban culture, alongside bars and nightclubs.

== Diners ==
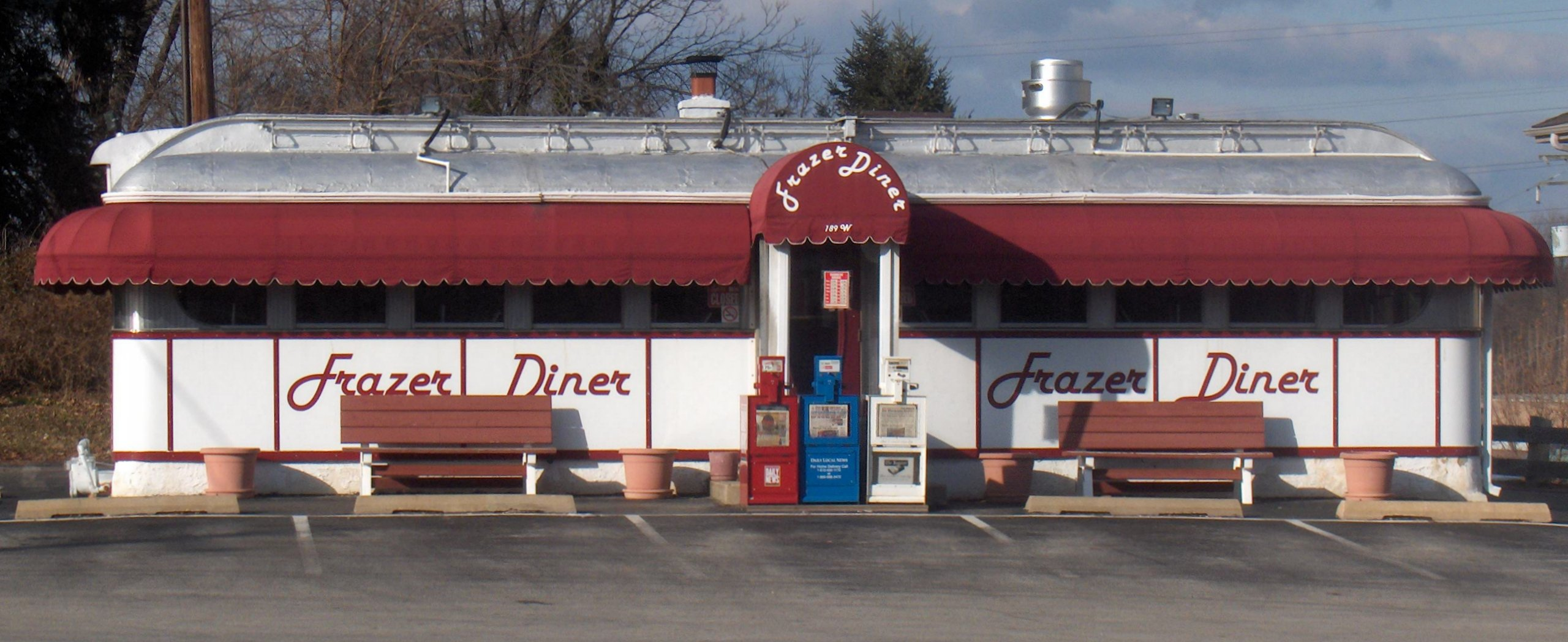
The Frazer Diner was built by the Jerry O'Mahony Diner Company and is its last surviving unaltered mid-1930s streamline modern diner.

- Bertie Lou's Cafe
- Blueplate Lunch Counter and Soda Fountain, Portland, Oregon
- Byways Cafe, Portland, Oregon
- Cup & Saucer Cafe, Portland, Oregon
- Dime Store, Portland, Oregon
- Dockside Saloon and Restaurant, Portland, Oregon
- Ellen's Stardust Diner, New York City
- Empire Diner, New York City
- Fair Deal Cafe, North Omaha, Nebraska
- Franks Diner, Kenosha, Wisconsin
- Frazer Diner, Pennsylvania
- Fuller's Coffee Shop, Portland, Oregon
- Glenwood, Eugene, Oregon
- Grits n' Gravy, Portland, Oregon
- Haven Brothers Diner, Providence, Rhode Island
- Hey Meatball, Toronto
- Jethro's Fine Grub, Toronto
- Lost Lake Cafe and Lounge, Seattle
- Ludi's, Seattle
- Madison Diner, Bainbridge Island, Washington
- Mecca Cafe, Seattle
- Moody's Diner, Waldoboro, Maine
- Moondance Diner, New York City
- Mustache Bill's Diner, Barnegat Light, New Jersey
- My Father's Place, Portland, Oregon
- Nite Hawk Cafe and Lounge, Portland, Oregon
- O'Rourke's Diner, Middletown, Connecticut
- Off the Griddle, Portland, Oregon
- Olga's Diner, New Jersey
- The Original Dinerant, Portland, Oregon
- Original Hotcake House, Portland, Oregon
- Pamela's Diner, Pittsburgh, Pennsylvania
- Paradox Cafe, Portland, Oregon (c. 1995 – 2025)
- Paris Coffee Shop, Fort Worth, Texas
- Patrician Grill, Toronto
- Pie 'n Burger, Pasadena, California
- Portland Penny Diner, Portland, Oregon
- Radio Room, Portland, Oregon
- Red Arrow Diner, New Hampshire
- Roscoe Diner, Roscoe, New York
- Rosedale Diner, Toronto, Canada
- Rosie's Diner, Rockford, Michigan
- The Roxy, Portland, Oregon (1994–2022)
- Ruby's Diner
- Ski Inn, Bombay Beach, California
- Skyline Restaurant, Portland, Oregon
- Summit Diner, Summit, New Jersey
- Tastee Diner, Maryland
- Tom's Restaurant, New York City
- Tom's Restaurant and Bar, Portland, Oregon
- US 30 Diner (formerly Lee's and Vicky's), York, Pennsylvania (1951–2019)
- White Manna, New Jersey

=== Diners on the U.S. National Register of Historic Places ===
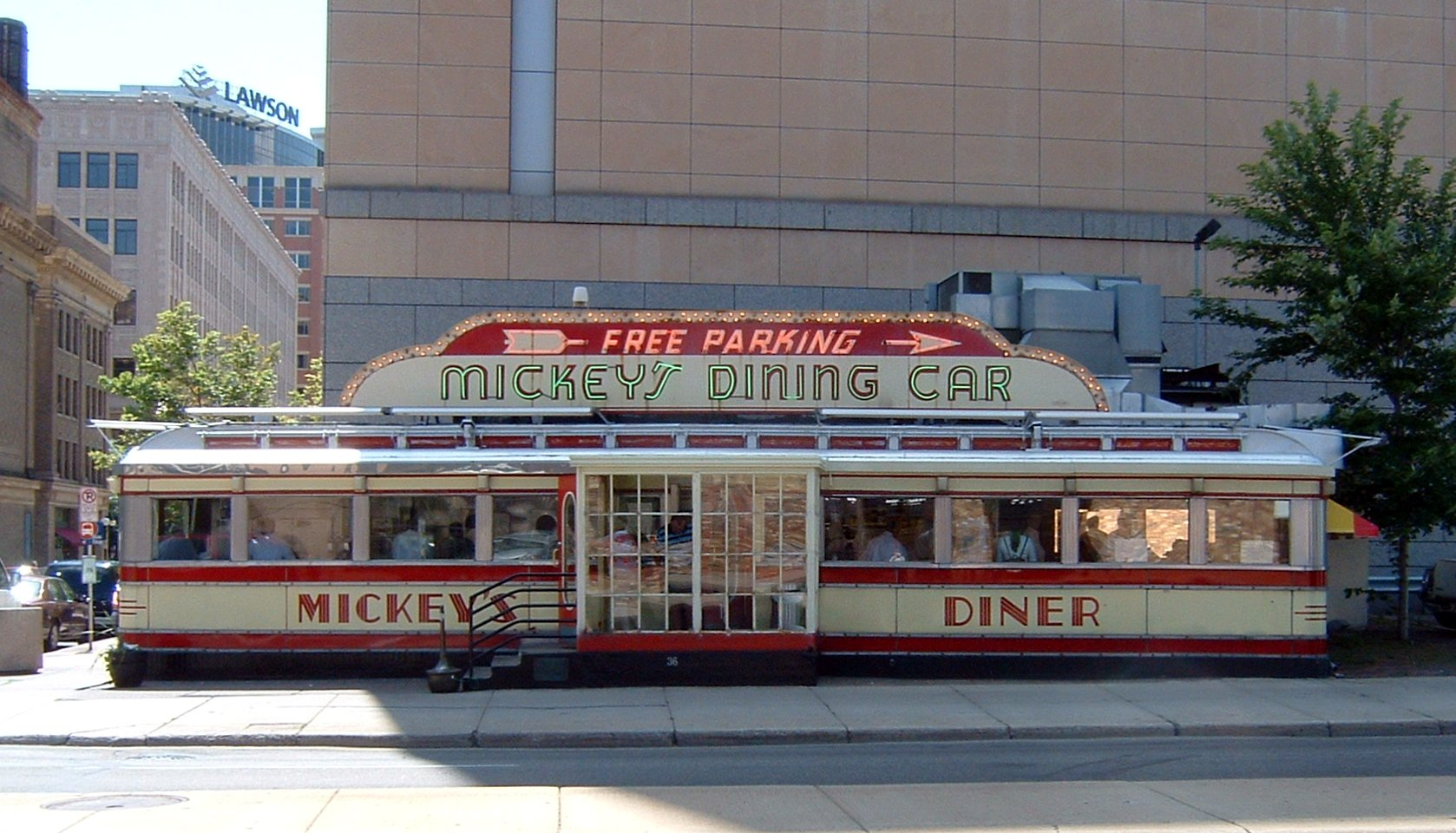
Mickey's Diner in St. Paul, Minnesota, was prefabricated in 1937 by the Jerry O'Mahony Diner Company of Elizabeth, New Jersey; shipped to Saint Paul by rail; and installed just before World War II.

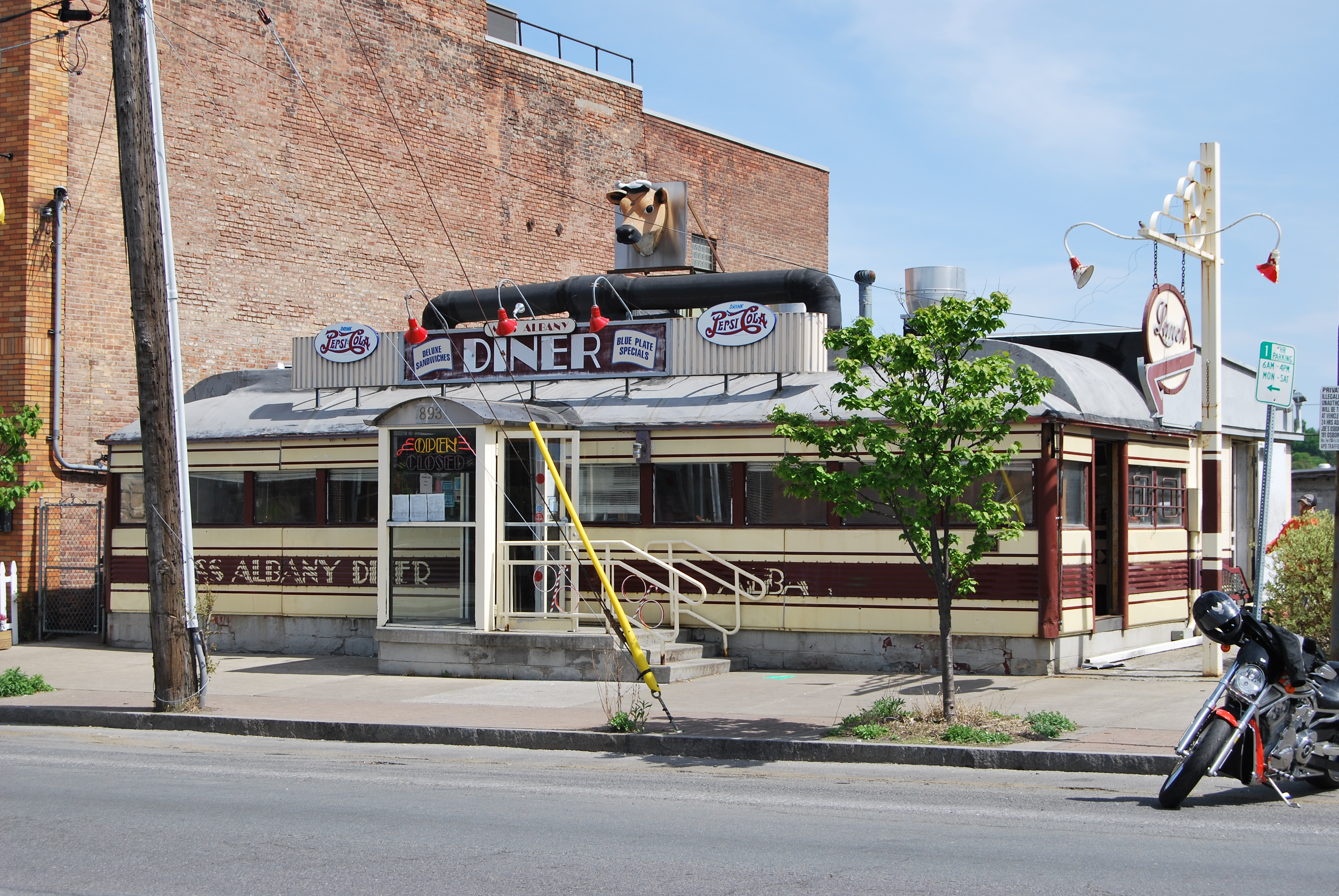
Miss Albany Diner in Albany, New York, was built in 1941.

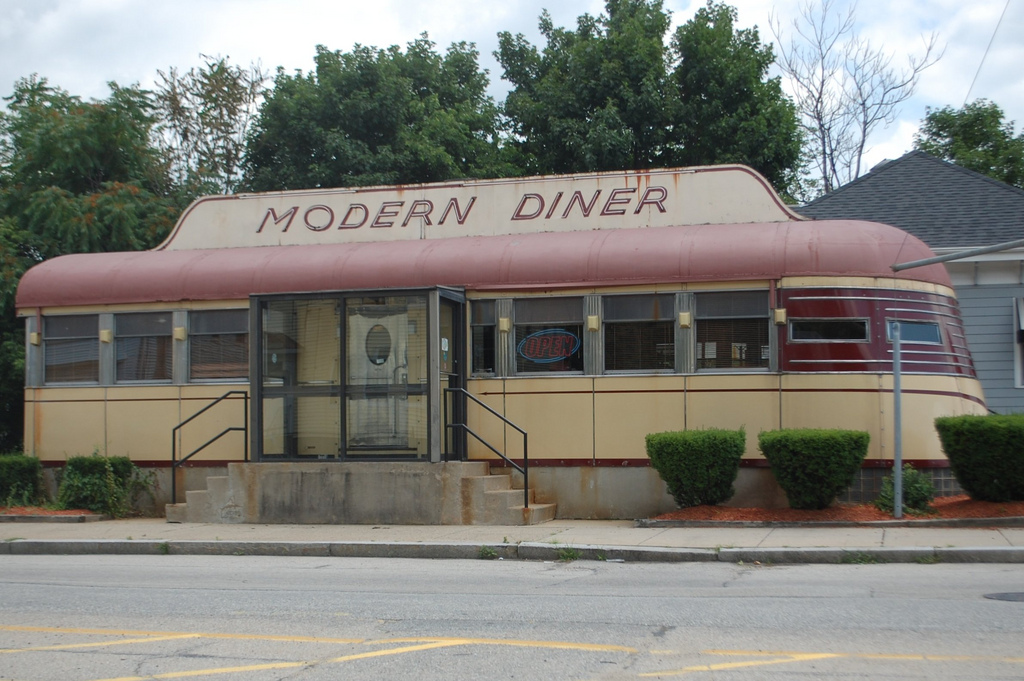
Modern Diner in Pawtucket, Rhode Island, was built in 1940.

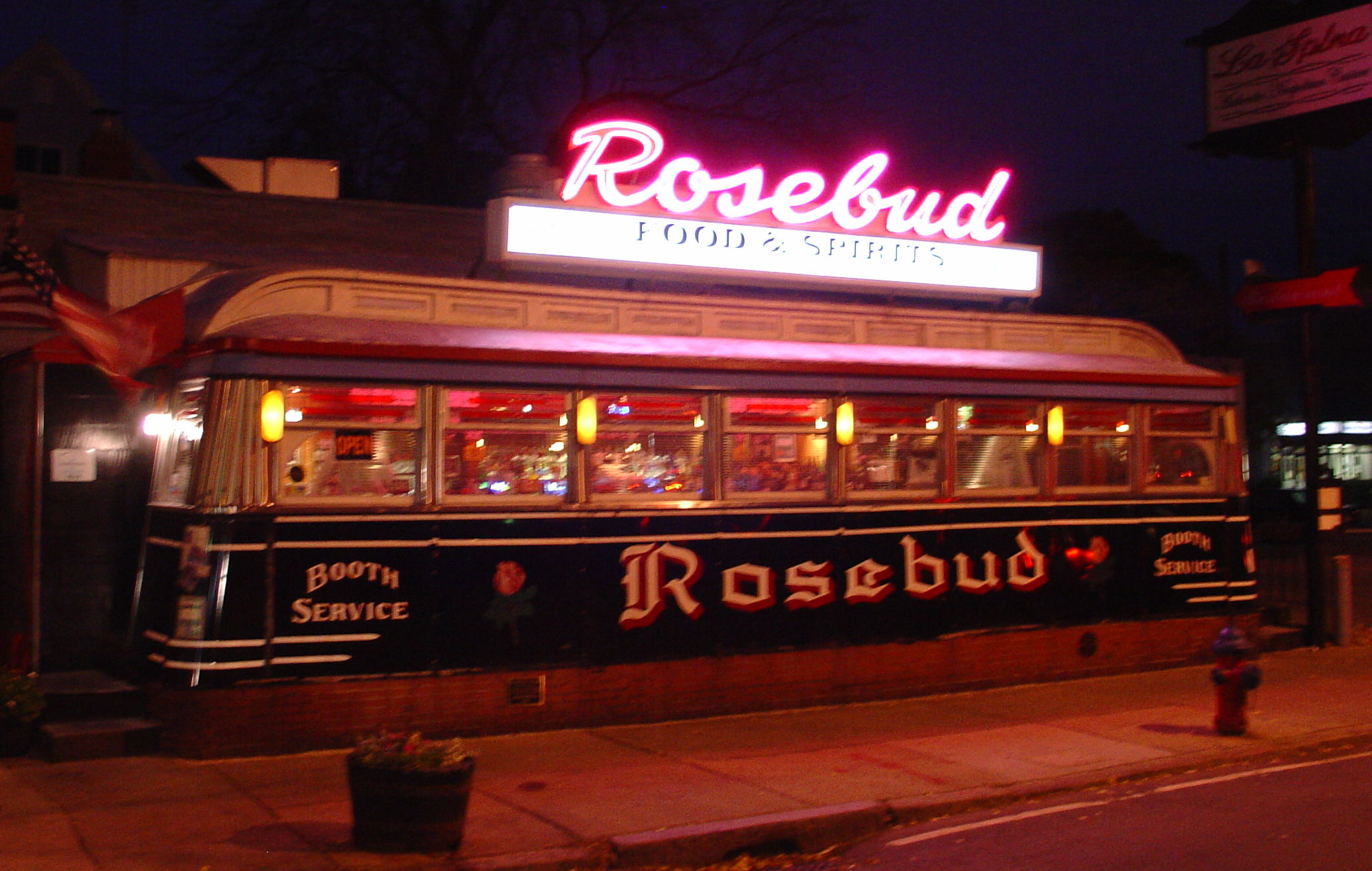
The Rosebud in Somerville, Massachusetts, was built in 1941 by the Worcester Lunch Car Company.

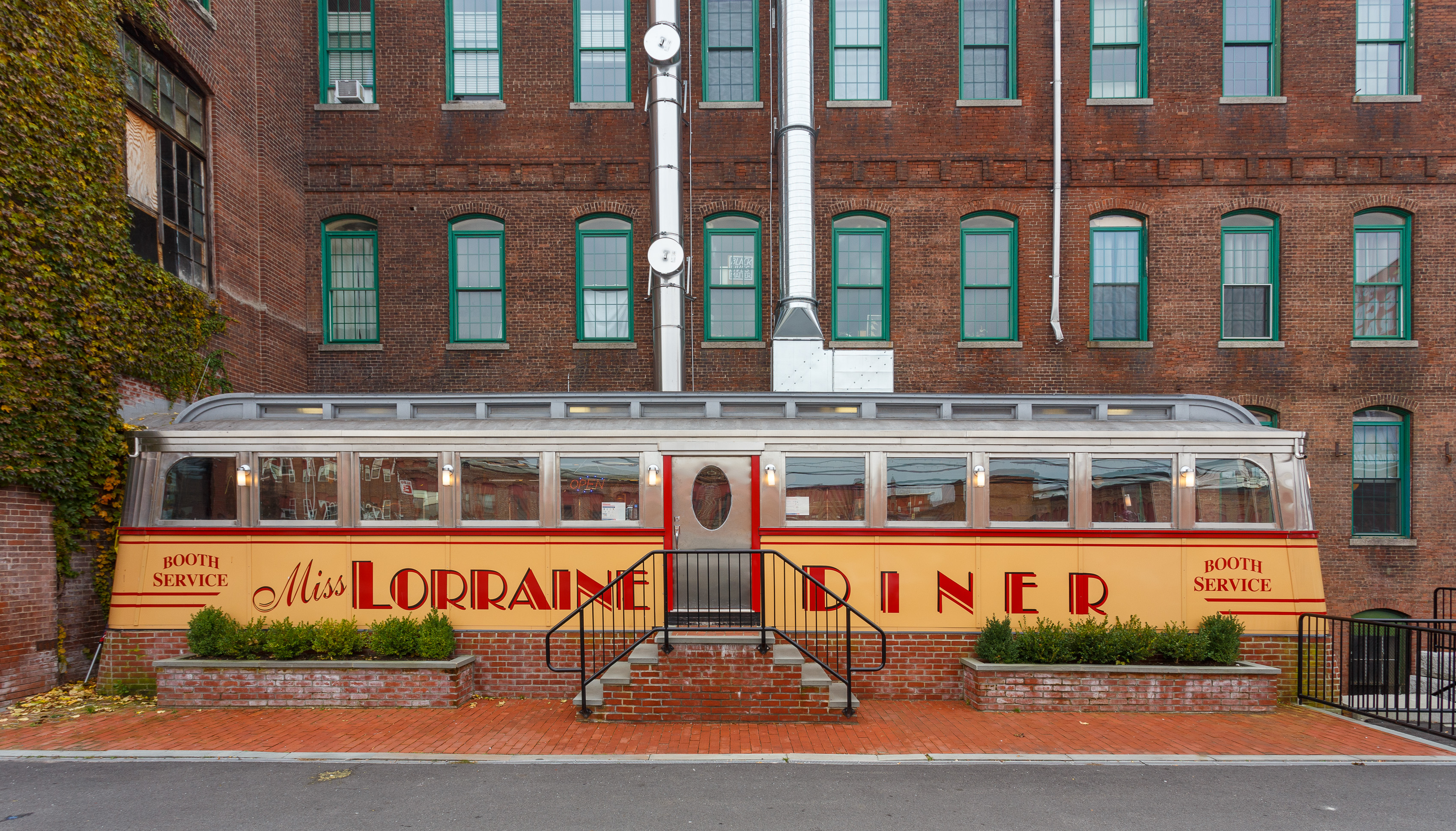
Miss Lorraine Diner, Pawtucket, Rhode Island (1941)

- 29 Diner, Fairfax, Virginia (closed since a November 2021 fire)
- Agawam Diner, Rowley, Massachusetts
- Al Mac's Diner-Restaurant, Fall River, Massachusetts
- Al's Diner, Chicopee, Massachusetts
- Pat's Diner (formerly Ann's), Salisbury, Massachusetts
- Bill's Diner, Chatham, Virginia
- Blue Moon Diner (formerly Miss Toy Town), Gardner, Massachusetts
- Boulevard Diner, Worcester, Massachusetts
- Burnett's Diner, Chatham, Virginia
- Capitol Diner, Lynn, Massachusetts
- Casey's Diner, Natick, Massachusetts
- Central Diner, Providence, Rhode Island
- Chadwick Square Diner, Worcester, Massachusetts
- Corner Lunch, Worcester, Massachusetts
- Dell Rhea's Chicken Basket, Willowbrook, Illinois
- Miss Lorraine Diner, Pawtucket, Rhode Island
- Jack's Diner, Woburn, Massachusetts
- Landrum's Hamburger System No. 1, Reno, Nevada
- Lawrence Park Dinor, Lawrence Park Township, Pennsylvania
- Lou Mitchell's, Chicago, Illinois
- Lloyd's Diner, Framingham, Massachusetts
- Mickey's Diner, Saint Paul, Minnesota
- Miss Albany Diner, Albany, New York
- Miss Bellows Falls Diner, Bellows Falls, Vermont
- Miss Florence Diner, Florence, Massachusetts
- Miss Worcester Diner, Worcester, Massachusetts
- Modern Diner, Pawtucket, Rhode Island
- Owl Diner (formerly Monarch), Lowell, Massachusetts
- Munson Diner, Liberty, New York
- New Bay Diner Restaurant, Springfield, Massachusetts
- West Side Diner (formerly Poirier's), Providence, Rhode Island
- Road Island Diner, Oakley, Utah
- Rock Café, Stroud, Oklahoma
- Rosebud, Somerville, Massachusetts
- Salem Diner, Salem, Massachusetts
- Sam's Diner, Kill Devil Hills, North Carolina
- Shawmut Diner, Dartmouth, Massachusetts (closed and moved in 2014)
- Skee's Diner, Torrington, Connecticut
- Ted's Diner, Milford, Massachusetts
- Town Diner, Watertown, Massachusetts
- Triangle Diner, Winchester, Virginia (closed since renovations stalled in 2014)
- Village Diner, Red Hook, New York
- Wilson's Diner, Waltham, Massachusetts

=== American diner-themed restaurant chains ===
- Johnny Rockets
- Silver Diner

=== International American-style diners ===
- Eddie Rocket's – an Irish restaurant chain
- Karen's Diner – Australian chain of theme restaurants
- OK Diner – a roadside restaurant chain in the United Kingdom

=== Historical ===
- Doggie Diner, San Francisco and Oakland, California

=== Fictional diners ===
- Mel's Diner
- Olympia Cafe
- Williamsburg Diner

== See also ==
- Bar mleczny
- Cha chaan teng – the term for diners in Hong Kong
- Dhaba – the term for Indian diners
- Diners, Drive-Ins and Dives
- Diner lingo
- Greasy spoon
- Lunch counter
- Mamak stall
- Roadside attraction
- Sandwich bar
- London cabmen's shelter
- Types of restaurant

=== Diner building manufacturers ===
- Fodero Dining Car Company
- Jerry O'Mahony Diner Company
- Kullman Dining Car Company
- Mountain View Diners Company
- Silk City Diners
- Worcester Lunch Car Company
