= Original Hotcake House =

Diner in Portland, Oregon, U.S.

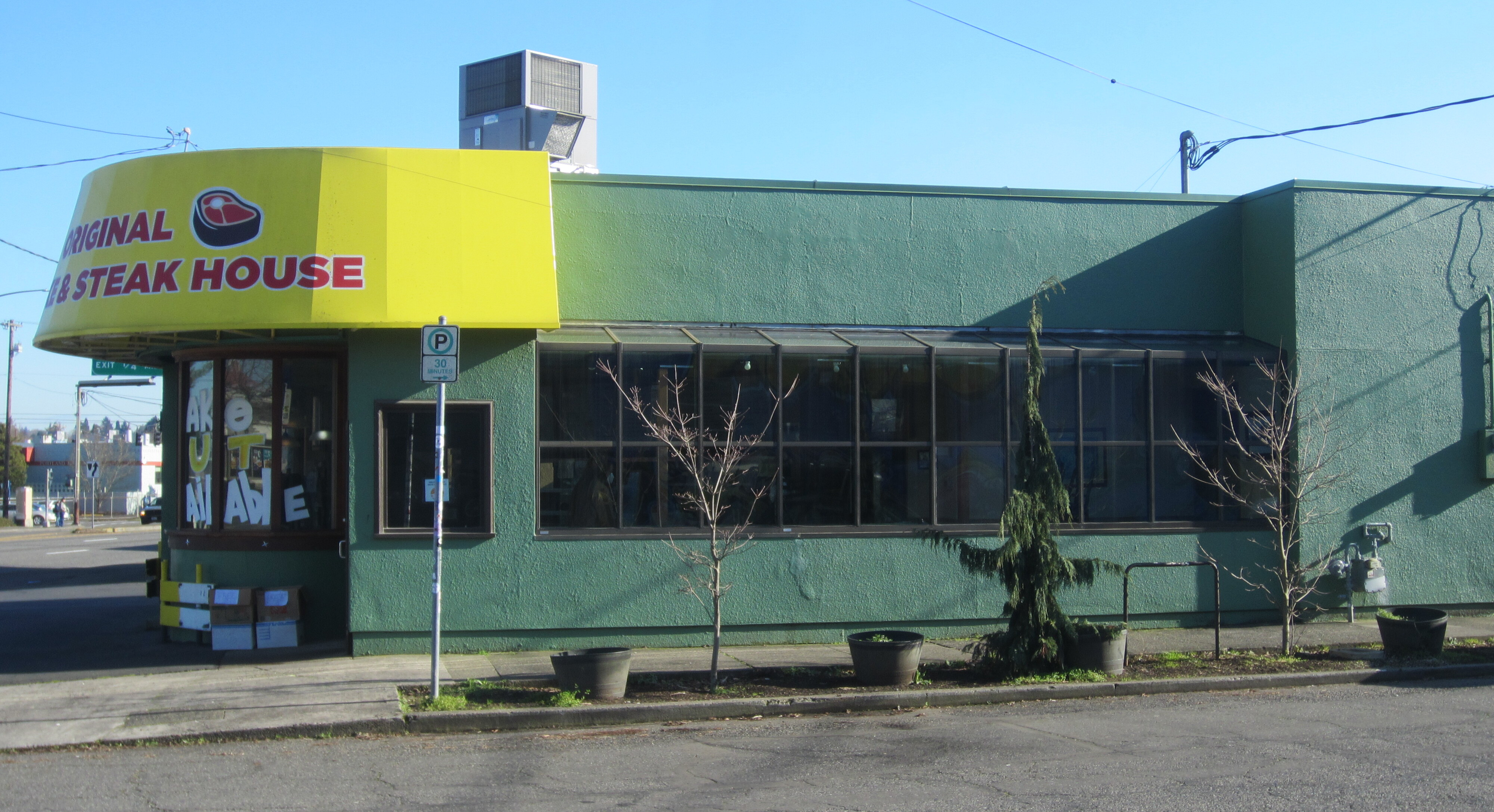
- The restaurant's exterior in 2021
- Interactive map of Original Hotcake House

Restaurant information
- Location: 1002 Southeast Powell Blvd., Portland, Oregon
- Coordinates: 45°30′04.1″N 122°39′20.1″W

The Original Hotcake House is a diner in Brooklyn, Portland, Oregon.

In 2018, Michael Russell of The Oregonian wrote, "If you've never crashed down in front of a plate of pancakes and fried eggs at the Original Hotcake House after a night out, you might not have lived in Portland long enough." Prior to the COVID-19 pandemic, the restaurant offered 24/7 service except on Thanksgiving and Christmas.

== See also ==
- List of diners
