= Modern Diner =

- U.S. National Register of Historic Places
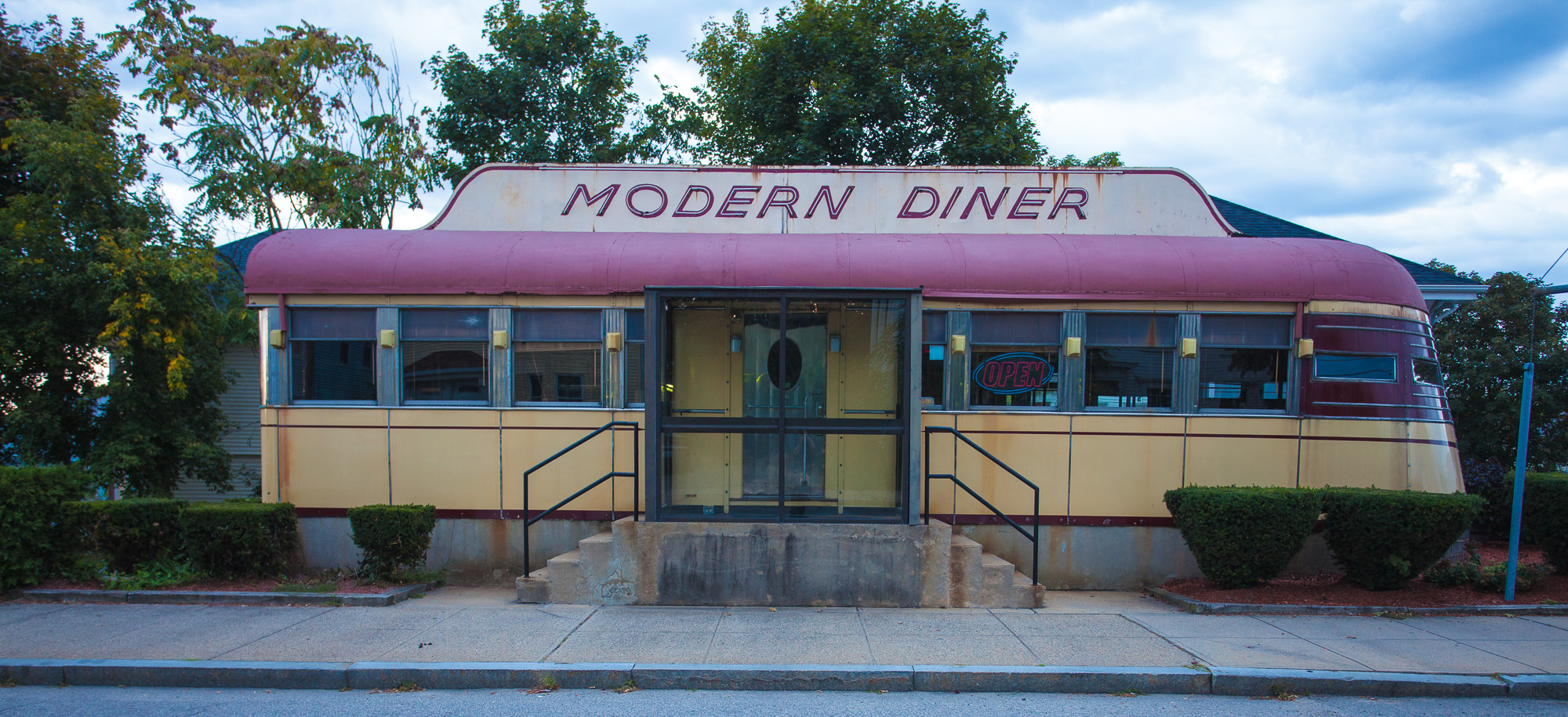
- Streetside view of the diner

- Location within Rhode Island Location within the United States
- Location: 364 East Ave., Pawtucket, Rhode Island
- Coordinates: 41°52′8″N 71°23′13″W
- Built: 1940
- Architect: J.B. Judkins Co.
- NRHP reference No.: 78000002
- Added to NRHP: October 19, 1978

The Modern Diner is a historic diner in Pawtucket, Rhode Island, United States.

== Description ==
The Modern Diner is one of the few known surviving Sterling Streamliner diner still in operation. Its profile resembles that of a 1934 silver locomotive that once pulled the streamlined Burlington Zephyr train. The diner's roof, now painted maroon, was originally silver.

New York City inventor Roland Stickney designed the diner, which the John B. Judkins Company of Merrimac, Massachusetts manufactured in 1940. The diner was originally placed at 13 Dexter Street in Pawtucket. It operated at that site until 1984, when it was moved to its present location to avoid demolition. The diner was listed on the National Register of Historic Places in 1978. It was the first diner to be added to the register.

The diner has been held by the same owner for over 28 years. Owner Nick Demou announced that the Modern Diner was up for sale in July 2025. Its signature Custard French Toast was featured on television's Food Network as one of the "top five diner dishes in the US" in 2015.

The COVID-19 pandemic caused it to reduce its services during 2020.

== Gallery ==
Interior

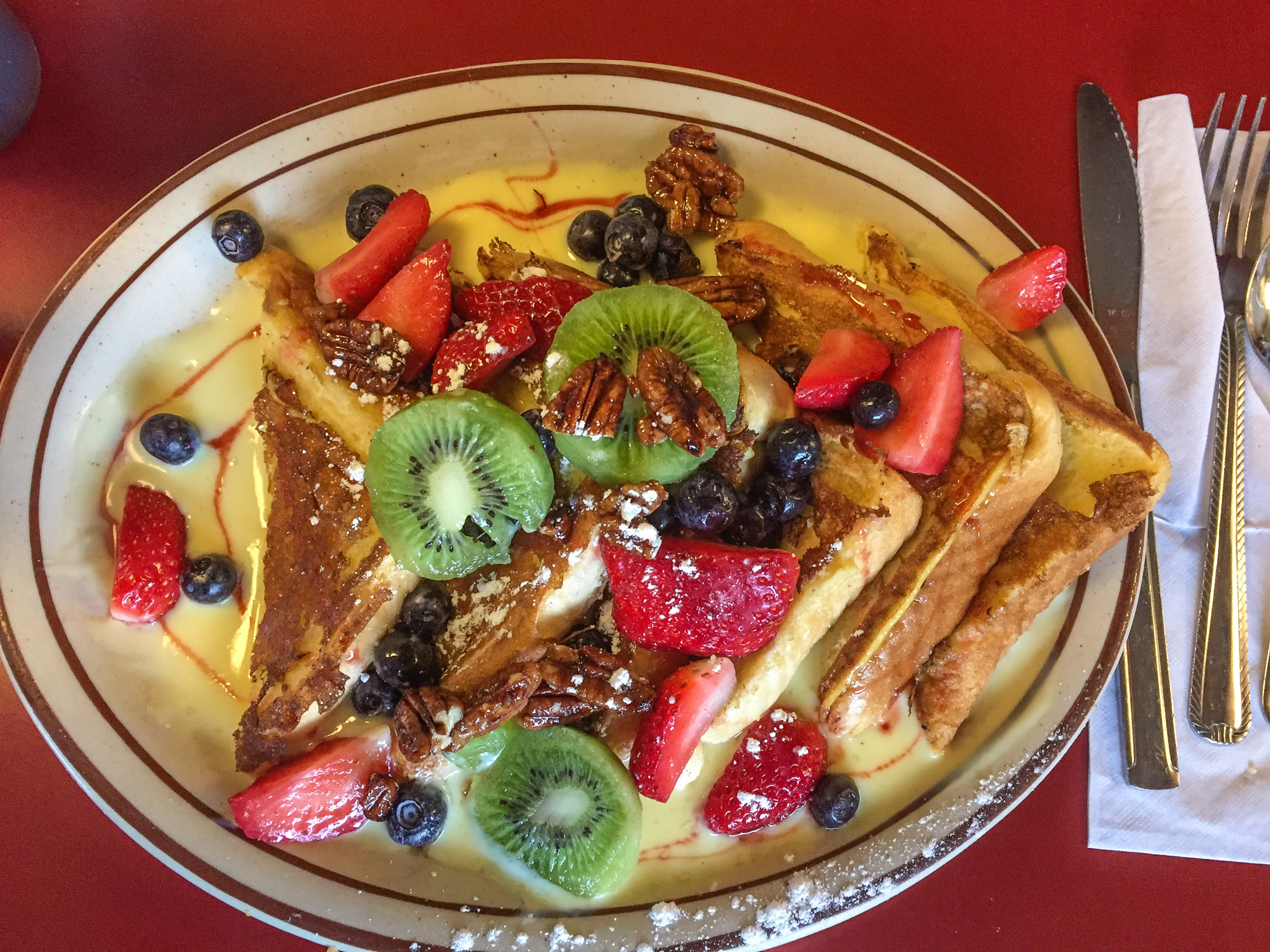
The diner's signature Custard French Toast

== See also ==
- List of diners
- National Register of Historic Places listings in Pawtucket, Rhode Island
