= Bertie Lou's Cafe =

Restaurant in Portland, Oregon, U.S.

- The restaurant's exterior, 2013
- Interactive map of Bertie Lou's Cafe

Restaurant information
- Established: 1943
- Owner: Robert Erickson
- Previous owner: Alexandria Osmer
- Location: 8051 Southeast 17th Avenue, Portland, Multnomah, Oregon, 97202, United States
- Coordinates: 45.4649°N 122.6472°W

Bertie Lou's Cafe is a restaurant in Portland, Oregon, United States. Established in 1943, the business operates in Southeast Portland's Sellwood-Moreland neighborhood.

== Description ==
The small restaurant Bertie Lou's Cafe operates at the intersection of 17th Avenue and Spokane Street in Southeast Portland's Sellwood-Moreland neighborhood. Eater Portland and The Bee have described the business as a "funky, old-school diner", and a "quirky breakfast café", respectively. Eater Portland has also said Bertie Lou's "feels like a timeless oasis nestled in the midst of an ever-changing city", with food options that "will hit the nostalgia buttons as powerfully as they vanquish post-hike hunger". Willamette Week has called Bertie Lou's a greasy spoon.

The interior has seven tables and a half-moon-shaped counter with backless stools the views of the kitchen. The walls have framed napkin art made by patrons over the years. The restaurant's menus have roses printed along the border. A neon sign is displayed on the exterior. There is also a newsstand with copies of The Bee.

=== Menu ===
Breakfast options have included biscuits and gravy, Eggs Benedict, omelettes, and scrambles, as well as French toast and waffles. The breakfast burrito has bacon, sausage, eggs, chili peppers, onions, cheese, guacamole, and sour cream. The Cafe Breakfast has fried potatoes topped with eggs, as well as toast. Guests can also order an entree with a half portion of Eggs Benedict and a half portion of biscuits and gravy. The Croissant Florentine is a version of Eggs Benedict with spinach instead of Canadian bacon, and the polenta Benedict has a hollandaise sauce with pesto. The restaurant has also served salmon cake Benedict and strawberry shortcake French toast. The home fries have chili peppers and onions. Sandwiches are on the lunch menu.

== History ==
Bertie Lou's was established in 1943 and claims to have offered "Portland's best mediocre breakfast" since World War II. Robert Erickson purchased the business from Alexandria Osmer in 2001.

== Reception ==
The restaurant's interior in 2013

The Oregonian included Bertie Lou's in a 2008 overview of Portland's best biscuits and gravy. The newspaper's Mims Copeland and Michael Russell described the cafe as an "old-school haunt" in 2024. In her 2014 book Food Lovers' Guide to Portland, Oregon, Laurie Wolf called Bertie Lou's a "great breakfast joint" that "is under the radar" and offers large portions. Dana Beck of The Bee said the restaurant was the neighborhood's "premiere breakfast café" in 2015. In a 2019 guide book by Moon Publications, Hollyanna McCollom wrote: "Bertie Lou's is the Estelle Getty of the breakfast world in PDX. She's tiny, colorful, and a bit rough around the edges, but oh boy, does she pack a punch."

Eater Portland included the Cafe Breakfast in a 2016 list of fourteen "solid" Portland breakfasts for less than $8. In the website's 2021 overview of the city's "most potent hangover cures", Ron Scott and Alex Frane called the Cafe Breakfast "quintessential hangover food, especially when doused with a liberal application of hot sauce". In 2022, the website's Nathan Williams recommended Bertie Lou's for a post-hike meal, noting its close proximity to Tryon Creek State Natural Area. Katherine Chew Hamilton included the business in Eater Portland's 2026 overview of the city's best breakfast restaurants. Frane, Brooke Jackson-Glidden, and Matthew Trueherz included Bertie Lou's in Portland Monthly's 2016 overview of the city's "outstanding" brunches. In the Portland Mercury's 2017 overview of "affordable brunches that appeal to the masses", Ciara Dolan called the restaurant "the kitschy, cozy shoebox diner of your brunch dreams".

== See also ==
- List of diners
