= Cup & Saucer Cafe =

Defunct restaurant in Portland, Oregon, U.S.

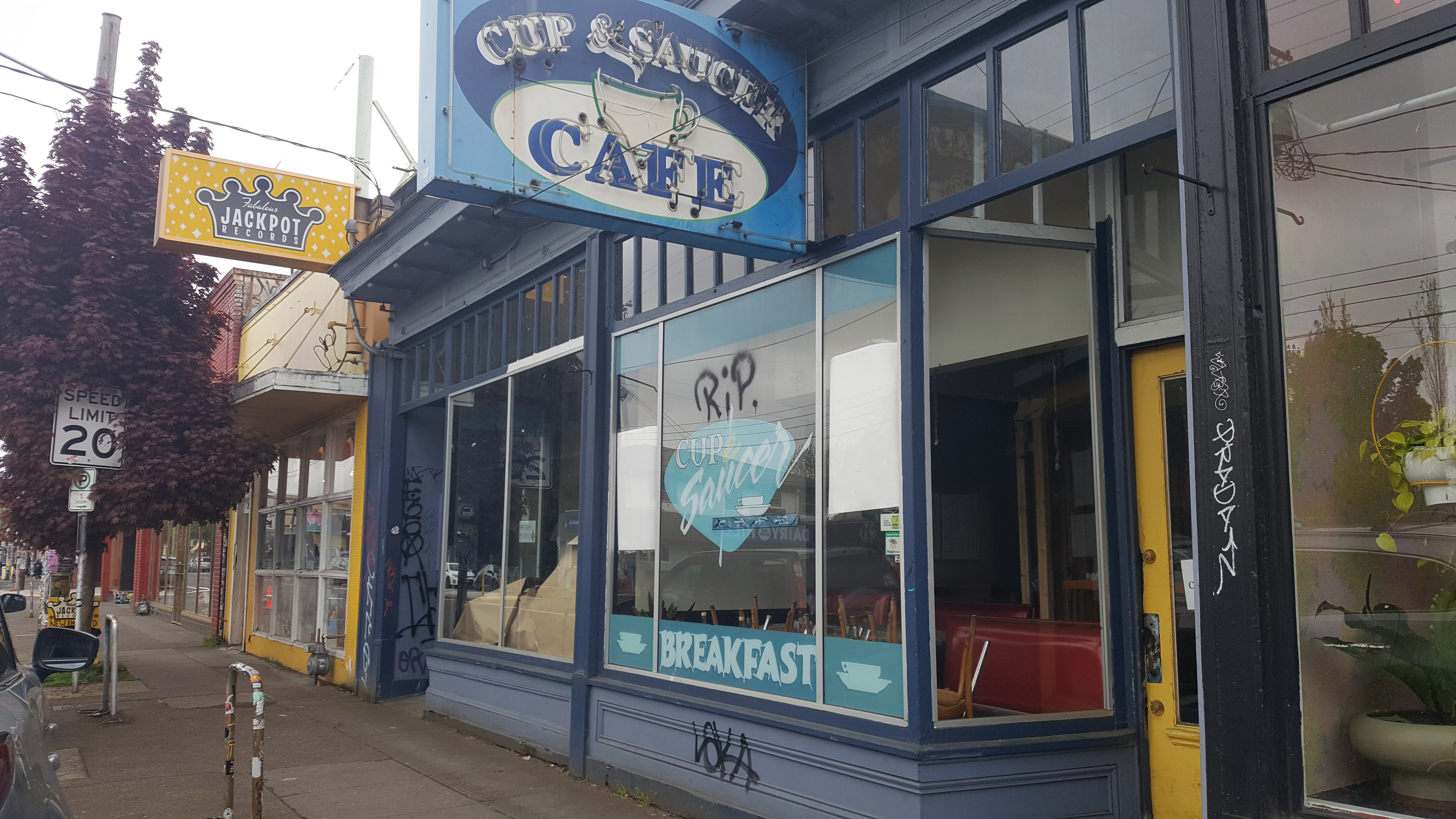
- Exterior of the original restaurant in southeast Portland's Richmond neighborhood, 2022
- Interactive map of Cup & Saucer Cafe

Restaurant information
- Closed: March 2022
- Owner: Karen Harding
- Food type: American
- Location: Portland, Oregon, United States
- Coordinates: 45.5120°N 122.6273°W
- Website: cupandsaucercafe.com

Cup & Saucer Cafe was a restaurant with multiple locations in Portland, Oregon.

== Description and history ==
Cup & Saucer Cafe was owned by Karen Harding. Portland Monthly has said, "For over two decades, Cup & Saucer has served up diner classics at multiple locations in Portland. The quintessential Portland diner, offering a menu of egg and tofu scrambles, sweet scones, salads, deli sandwiches, and burgers, this homey eatery caters to a just about everyone with huge portions and sustainable ingredients." The menu also had sour cream coffee cake, as well as gluten-free and vegan options.

The original restaurant opened on Hawthorne Boulevard in southeast Portland's Richmond neighborhood, within the Hawthorne District, in the late 1980s. According to The Oregonian, the restaurant's walls were "heavy with posters for women's karate and foreign policy groups". Another location briefly operated in downtown Portland during the early 1990s, and was later replaced by a bicycle shop.

The Cup & Saucer on Denver Avenue in north Portland's Kenton neighborhood was replaced by Derby, which opened in 2018. The Cup & Saucer on Killingsworth Street in northeast Portland's Concordia neighborhood was replaced by Jinx, which opened in 2019. The original Cup & Saucer was the last to close, doing so in early March 2022 after operating for 34 years. Eater Portland attributed the Hawthorne restaurant's closure to the COVID-19 pandemic. The space became a second Little Griddle location.

== Reception ==
In his 2017 city guide of Portland, Robert Hull of The Guardian called the Cup & Saucer in north Portland "a good backup option" for Tin Shed Garden Cafe and recommended the Tommy-go-Hammy omelette.

== See also ==
- Impact of the COVID-19 pandemic on the restaurant industry in the United States
- List of diners
- List of restaurant chains in the United States
