= Jethro's Fine Grub =

Defunct diner in Vancouver, British Columbia, Canada

Restaurant information
- Closed: August 2019
- Location: Vancouver, British Columbia, Canada

Jethro's Fine Grub was a diner in Vancouver, British Columbia, Canada. The restaurant was featured on the Food Network series Diners, Drive-Ins and Dives. It was known for its large pancakes. The diner closed at the end of August 2019 upon the owners' retirement.

== See also ==
- List of diners
- List of Diners, Drive-Ins and Dives episodes
- List of restaurants in Vancouver
