= Glenwood (restaurant) =

Restaurant in Eugene, Oregon, U.S.

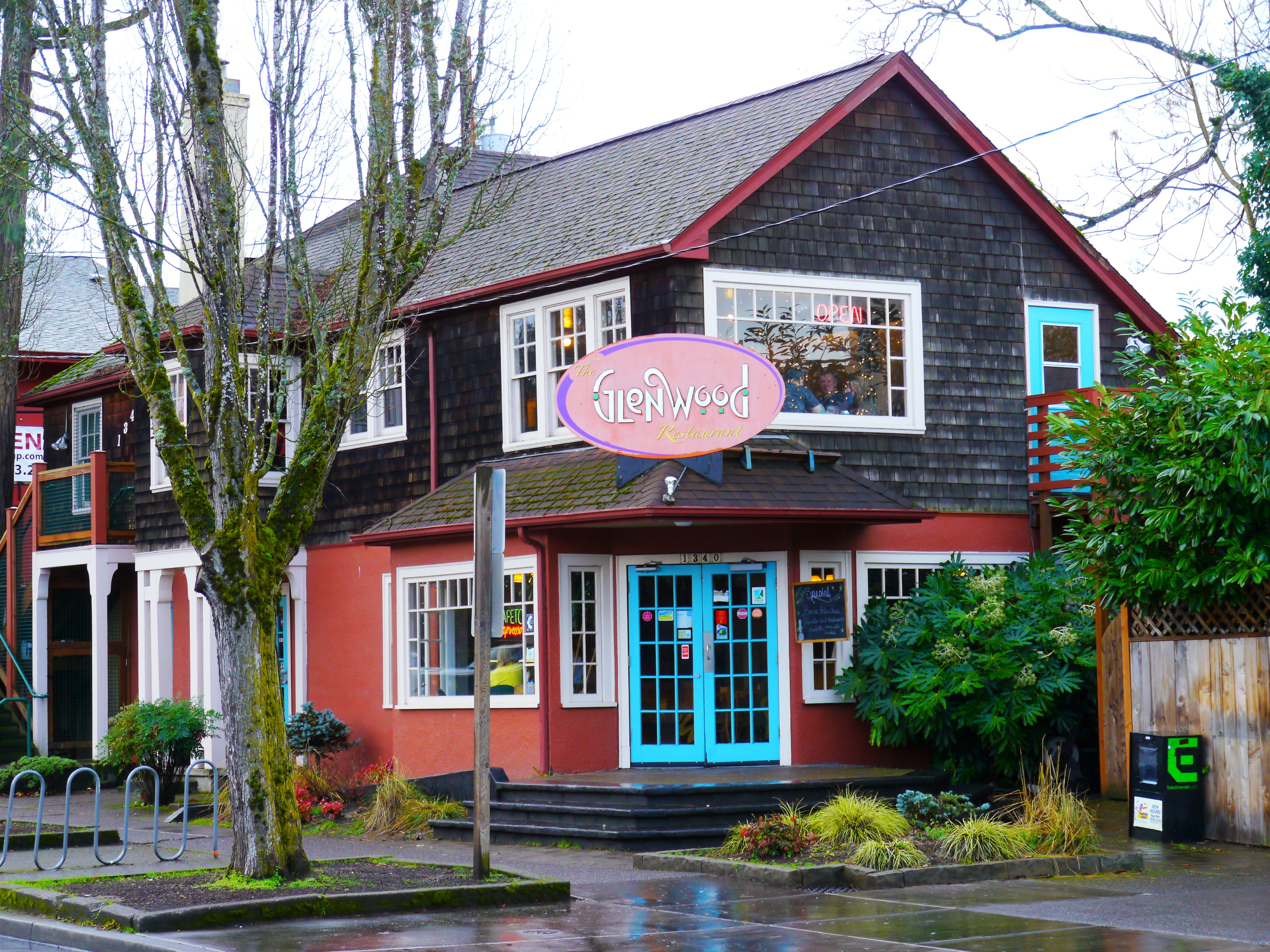
- Exterior of the defunct restaurant on Alder Street in 2017
- Interactive map of Glenwood

Restaurant information
- Owner: Jacqui Willey
- Location: 2588 Willamette Street, Eugene, Oregon, United States
- Coordinates: 44°01′49″N 123°05′28″W
- Website: glenwoodrestaurants.com

Glenwood is a restaurant in Eugene, Oregon. Previously, the business operated a second location near the University of Oregon campus.

== Description ==
The diner Glenwood operates in a strip mall in south Eugene, Oregon. Previously, a second location operated on Alder Street, near the campus of the University of Oregon. Glenwood serves American cuisine.

Among breakfast options on the menu are Eggs Benedict, French toast, gluten-free pancakes, and the Monster brunch burrito, which has bacon, fries, ham, mushrooms, and vegetables. The Santa Fe bowl has avocado, rice and beans, salsa, kale, spinach, and other vegetables. Glenwood also serves coffee, beer, kombucha, mimosas, and wine.

== History ==
The business is owned by Jacqui Willey. The Alder Street restaurant opened in 1983. Wiley said that students were approximately half of the location's clientele. The business began composting in 2011.

During the COVID-19 pandemic, both locations launched Takeaway Family Dinner. The Alder Street restaurant was sold, demolished, and replaced by apartments. The location ended operations in April 2022. The owner of the Excelsior, a fine dining restaurant on Alder Street, cited the demolition and replacement of Glenwood as a reason for closing Elxelsior in 2022. The building that had housed Glenwood was demolished in December 2022.

== Reception ==
Glenwood was nominated in the Best Comfort Food and Best Hangover Breakfast categories in a readers' poll hosted by Eugene Weekly in 2018. Brenna Houck included Glenwood in Eater Portland's 2024 overview of fourteen "vital" breakfast and brunch eateries in Eugene.

== See also ==
- List of diners
