= Radio Room =

Bar and restaurant in Portland, Oregon, U.S.

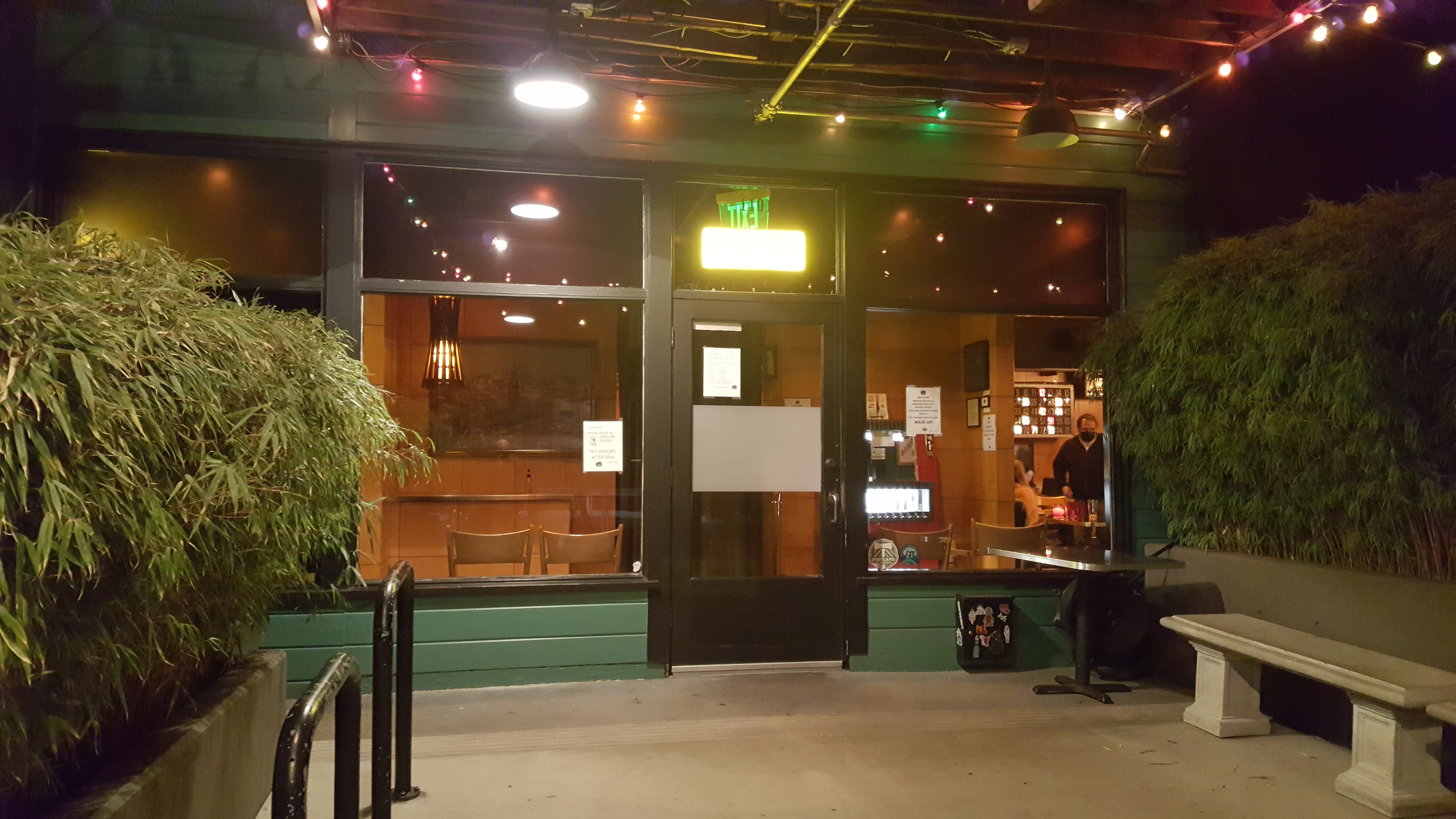
- The restaurant's front entrance at night, 2022
- Interactive map of Radio Room

Restaurant information
- Established: 2008
- Owner: Brian Alfrey
- Food type: New American
- Location: 1101 Northeast Alberta Street, Portland, Multnomah, Oregon, 97211, United States
- Coordinates: 45.5592°N 122.6543°W
- Website: radioroompdx.com

Radio Room is a bar and restaurant in Portland, Oregon, United States.

== Description ==
Radio Room is a bar and restaurant on Alberta Street in northeast Portland's King neighborhood. Alex Frane of Eater Portland described Radio Room as "a multi-roomed, double-decker diner and bar ... open every day of the year with almost every kind of service, including brunch, lunch, dinner, and a daily happy hour from 10 p.m. to 2 am., one of the latest in town". The menu has included chorizo burritos, fish tacos, poutine, Caesar salad, Brussels sprouts, and a vegan barbecue sandwich.

== History ==
Designed by Ankrom Moisan Associated Architects, the restaurant opened in 2008.

Brian Alfrey is a co-owner.

== Reception ==
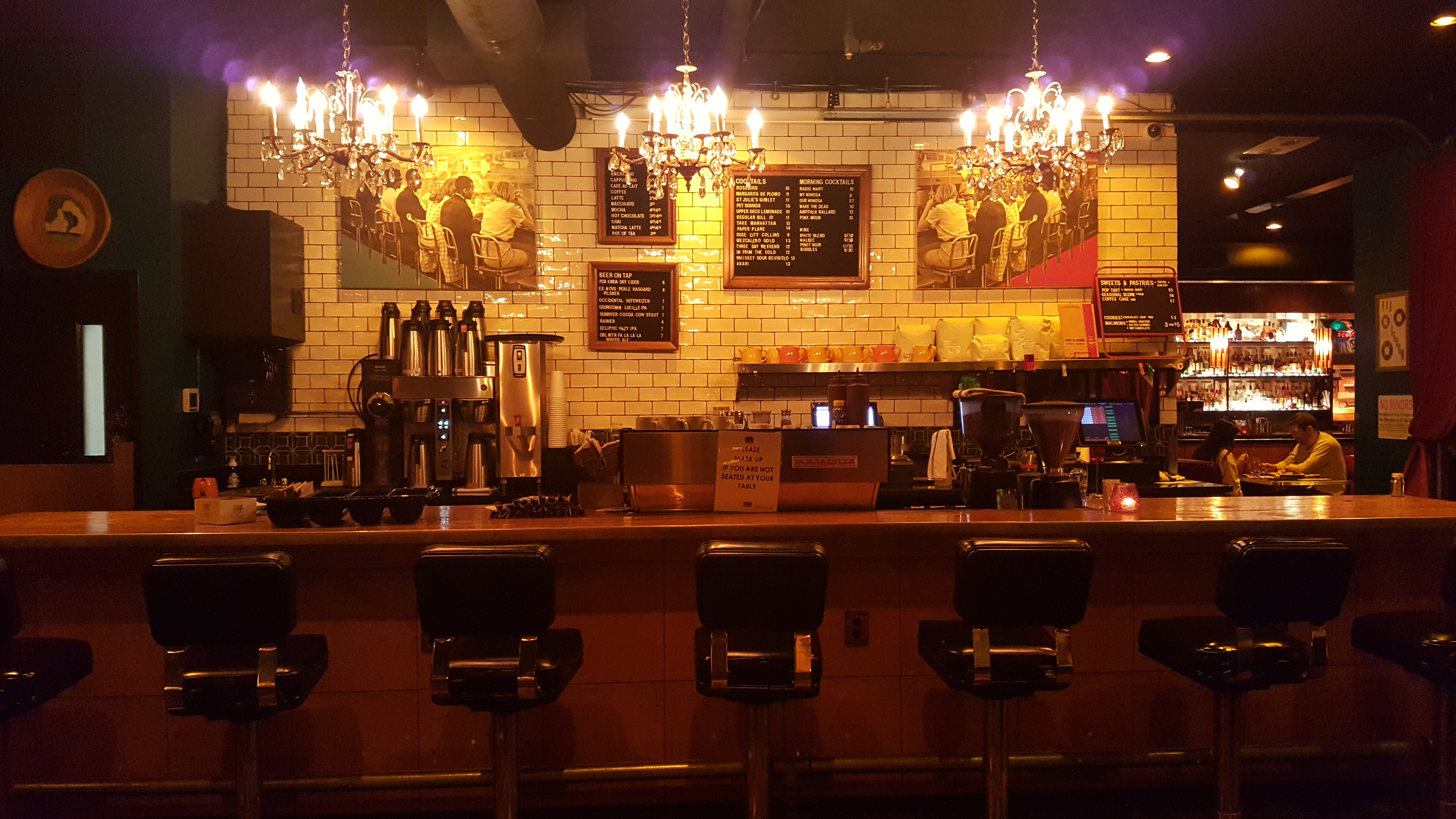
Interior counter, 2022

Alex Frane included Radio Room in Eater Portland's 2019 list of fourteen "spots to day-drink" in the city. He wrote, "Not only is it open every day at 9 a.m. with the full drink menu on offer, but the diner-style bar Radio Room is open 365 days a year for year-round day-drinking. With an extensive breakfast and lunch menu, full bar, cocktails, beer, wine, and coffee drinks, it's easy to while away a day here, especially out on the double-decker patio with a view of Alberta." In 2020, he also included the restaurant in an overview of Portland's "legit late-night" happy hours and a list of the city's nine "ideal rooftop patios for views, drinks, and sun". The website's Brooke Jackson-Glidden included Radio Room in a 2020 overview of recommended places for bachelorette parties, writing: "In an artsy-funky space on Alberta, Radio Room is a good choice for a relaxed meal with plenty of drinks. Whether it's more of a bachelorette brunch or a late-night party on the upstairs patio, Radio Room can accommodate most, and easily handles larger parties."

Radio Room was also included in Eater Portland's 2021 list of fourteen "cozy" bars and restaurants with fireplaces. The website said, "Although Radio Room is mostly known for its large outdoor fireplace on the lower-floor patio, the dining room with the retro bingo sign is also home to a burly wood stove. To lean into the cold-weather vibes, opt for a bowl of the soup du jour, or a hearty plate of brunch biscuits and gravy." Frane also included Radio Room in a 2022 list of seventeen bar patios in the city "for winter revelry". He said the restaurant has "always sported one of the best patios on Alberta, with multiple levels, coverings, heaters, and plant life, making it a lovely space to watch a sunset". Katherine Chew Hamilton and Jackson-Glidden included Radio Room in the website's 2025 list of the city's best restaurants and food cart pods for large groups.

== See also ==
- List of diners
- List of New American restaurants
