= Madison Diner =

Restaurant in Bainbridge Island, Washington, U.S.

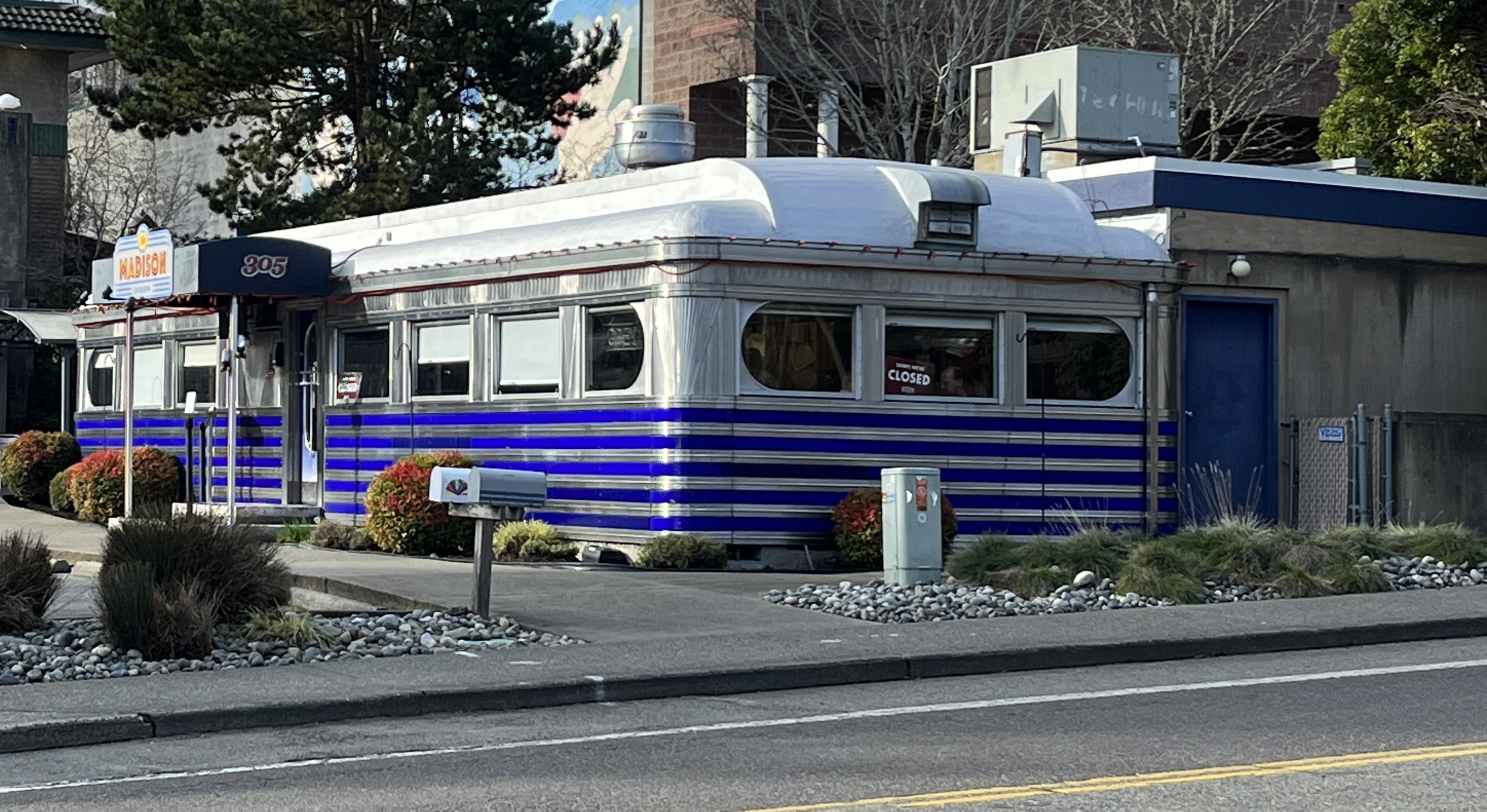
- The Madison Diner in 2023
- Interactive map of Madison Diner

Restaurant information
- Location: 305 Madison Ave North, Bainbridge Island, Washington, 98110, United States
- Coordinates: 47°37′37″N 122°31′16″W

The Madison Diner, formerly known as Big Star Diner, is a restaurant in Bainbridge Island, Washington. It has been featured on the Food Network series Diners, Drive-Ins and Dives. Moon Washington says the diner has a "retro, 1950s-era setting". The menu has included breakfast options such as corn pancakes and bacon, as well as burgers, salads, sandwiches, and a chorizo scramble and salmon hash.

== See also ==
- List of diners
- List of Diners, Drive-Ins and Dives episodes
