= Frazer Diner =

Original 1930s diner in Pennsylvania, U.S.

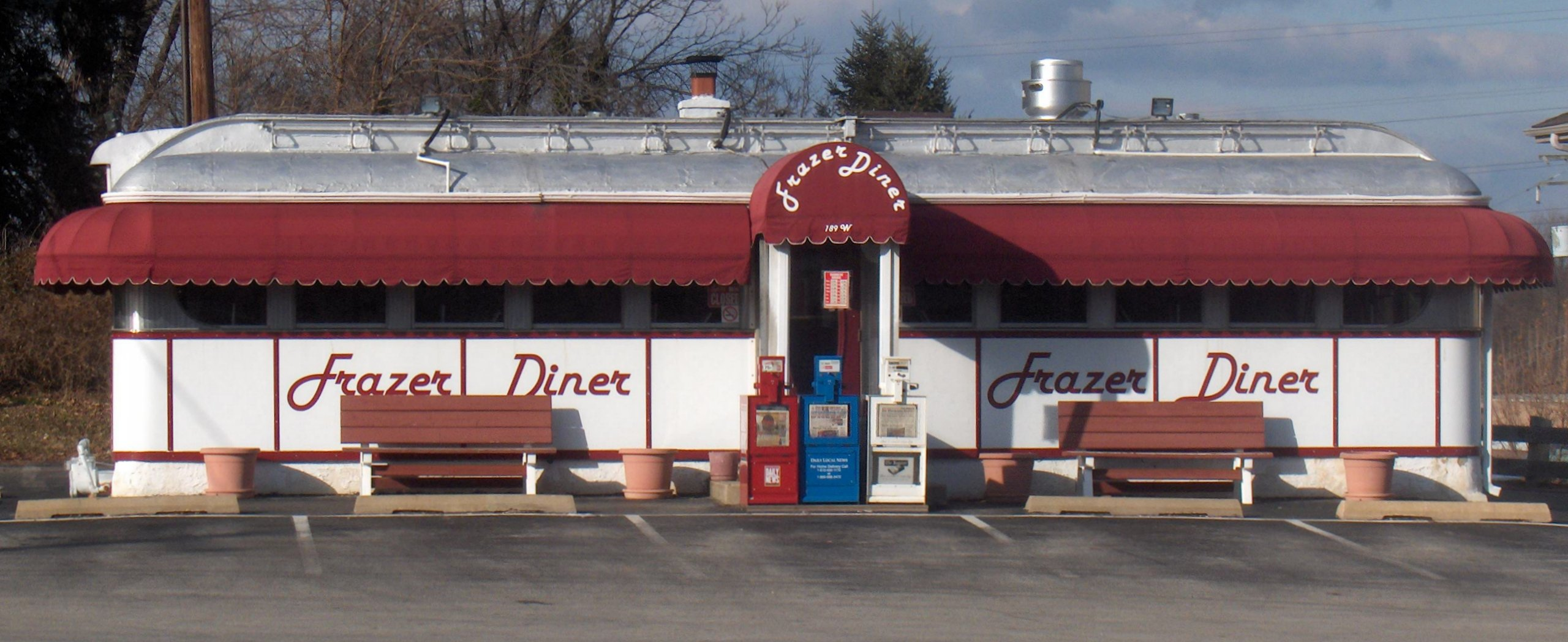

- Location within Pennsylvania Frazer Diner (the United States)

General information
- Type: Diner
- Location: 189 Lancaster Avenue, Frazer, Pennsylvania 19355, East Whitland Township, United States
- Coordinates: 40.04190°N 75.53761°W
- Completed: 1929-1935 in Paoli, Pennsylvania

The Frazer Diner, in Chester County, Pennsylvania, was built by the Jerry O'Mahony Diner Company and was the last example of an unaltered mid-1930s streamline modern O'Mahoney diner. Its original features include the monitor roof, half-moon windows, and porcelian-enameled base. The diner was split lengthwise and originally shipped to Paoli, Pennsylvania and operated as the Paoli Diner.

Originally manufactured in 1935 (though some sites reference 1929), it was purchased by Frances and Sylvester Cavalati in 1957 and moved to its present location at 189 Lancaster Avenue, Frazer, Pennsylvania in East Whiteland Township. In 1972, while retaining ownership, they leased it to others to operate and the name was changed to the Frazer Diner.

Around 1983, the diner was leased to Tam Nguyen and his wife Hao (law school graduate and nurse, respectively) who had fled communism in Vietnam and moved to the Main Line in 1980. They operated it as the Linh Diner, specializing in Vietnamese-Chinese food, and it became a regular lunch stop for nearby high-tech companies in the Great Valley. After five years building a successful business, they were running out of space. As such, they started looking to move to a new location that was to be built as part of a new shopping center nearby. Before that happened, the Cavalati's served the Nguyens an eviction notice, and noted there was a buyer who wanted to move the diner to Hollywood. The Nguyens did eventually open the Linh Restaurant nearby, but the diner was not moved to California, and eventually re-opened, once again as the Frazer Diner.

The Frazer Diner closed at the end of 2022, and as of 2024 now houses the Taco Mar Mexican restaurant.

== See also ==
- List of diners
