= Paradox Cafe =

Defunct restaurant in Portland, Oregon, U.S.

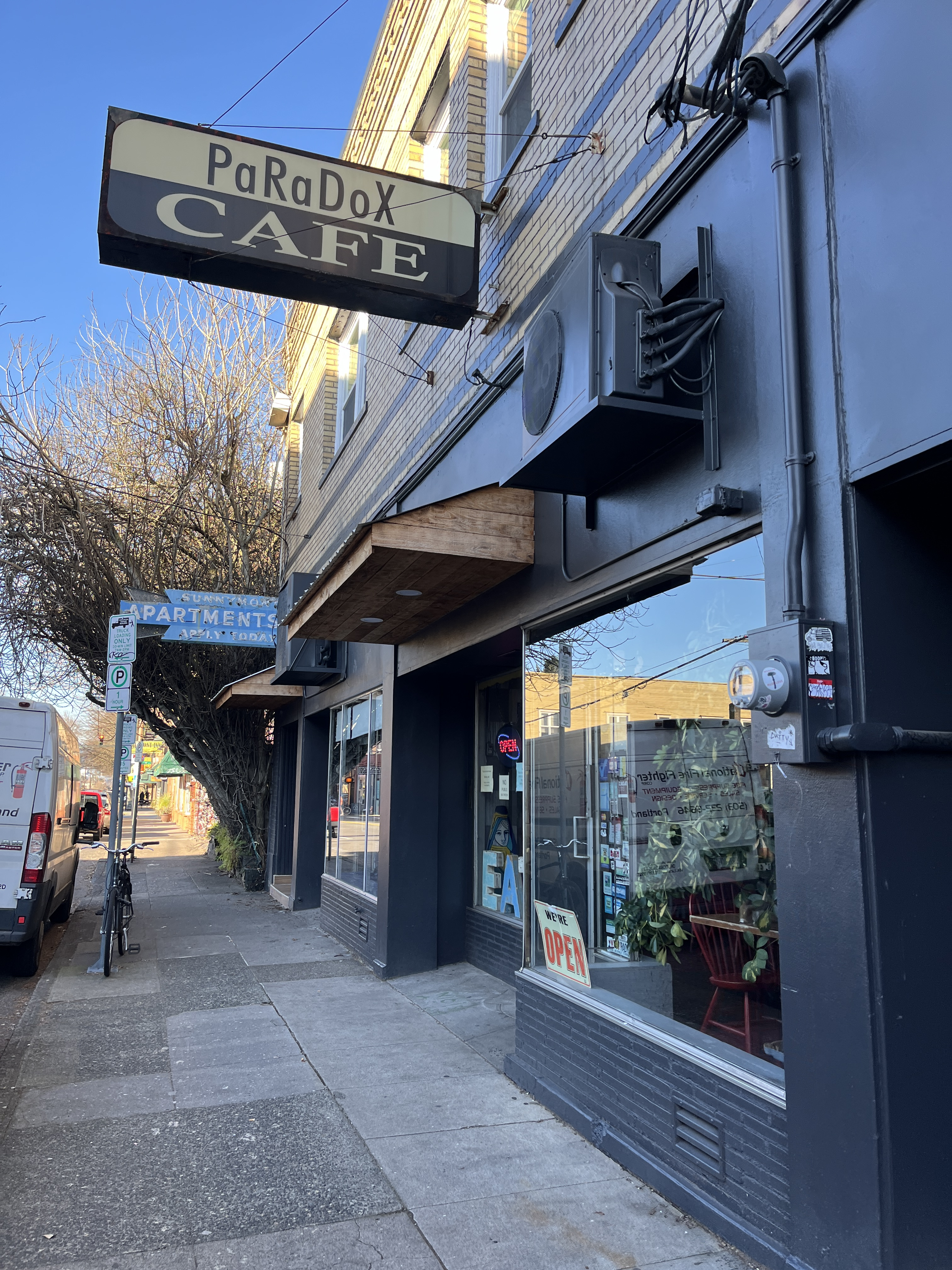
- The diner's exterior in 2025
- Interactive map of Paradox Cafe

Restaurant information
- Closed: 2025
- Location: 3439 Southeast Belmont Street, Portland, Multnomah, Oregon, 97214, United States
- Coordinates: 45.5166°N 122.6287°W
- Website: paradoxorganiccafe.com

Paradox Cafe was a vegan-friendly restaurant in Portland, Oregon, United States. It was among the city's oldest vegan diners before closing permanently in 2025.

== Description ==
The vegan-friendly diner Paradox Cafe operated on Belmont Street in southeast Portland's Sunnyside neighborhood. It served breakfast, lunch, and dinner. According to Portland Monthly, Paradox was "a haven for vegetarians and vegans alike" and offered large food portions. The interior had formica tables. The menu included biscuits and gravy, buckwheat pancakes, burgers, salads, sandwiches, scrambles, and soups. The restaurant also served a vegan corndog. The vegan Holy Molé Chili had pinto beans, chiles, garlic, onions, chiles, and spices.

== History ==
Owner Bonnie Downey purchased the cafe in 2006. Danny Belthius was the chef in 2014. The restaurant had eight employees in 2018. The restaurant closed permanently in 2025, operating for approximately 30 years.

== Reception ==
Paradox won in the Best Flesh-Free Restaurant category of Willamette Week's annual 'Best of Portland' readers' poll in 2002. In 2019, the newspaper said, "With its prices seemingly frozen in time and an inexplicable lack of crowds and lines, telling the world about this place feels like betrayal. Paradox Cafe may be Portland's best-kept brunch secret. A go-to is the hog-style (herb and onion) biscuits and gravy, washed down with a hot cup of coffee kept fresh by attentive servers." Eater Portland included Paradox in a 2016 list of the city's twelve "iconic" greasy spoon breakfast restaurants.

== See also ==
- List of defunct restaurants of the United States
- List of diners
- List of vegetarian and vegan restaurants
