= Lost Lake Cafe and Lounge =

Diner in Seattle, Washington, U.S.

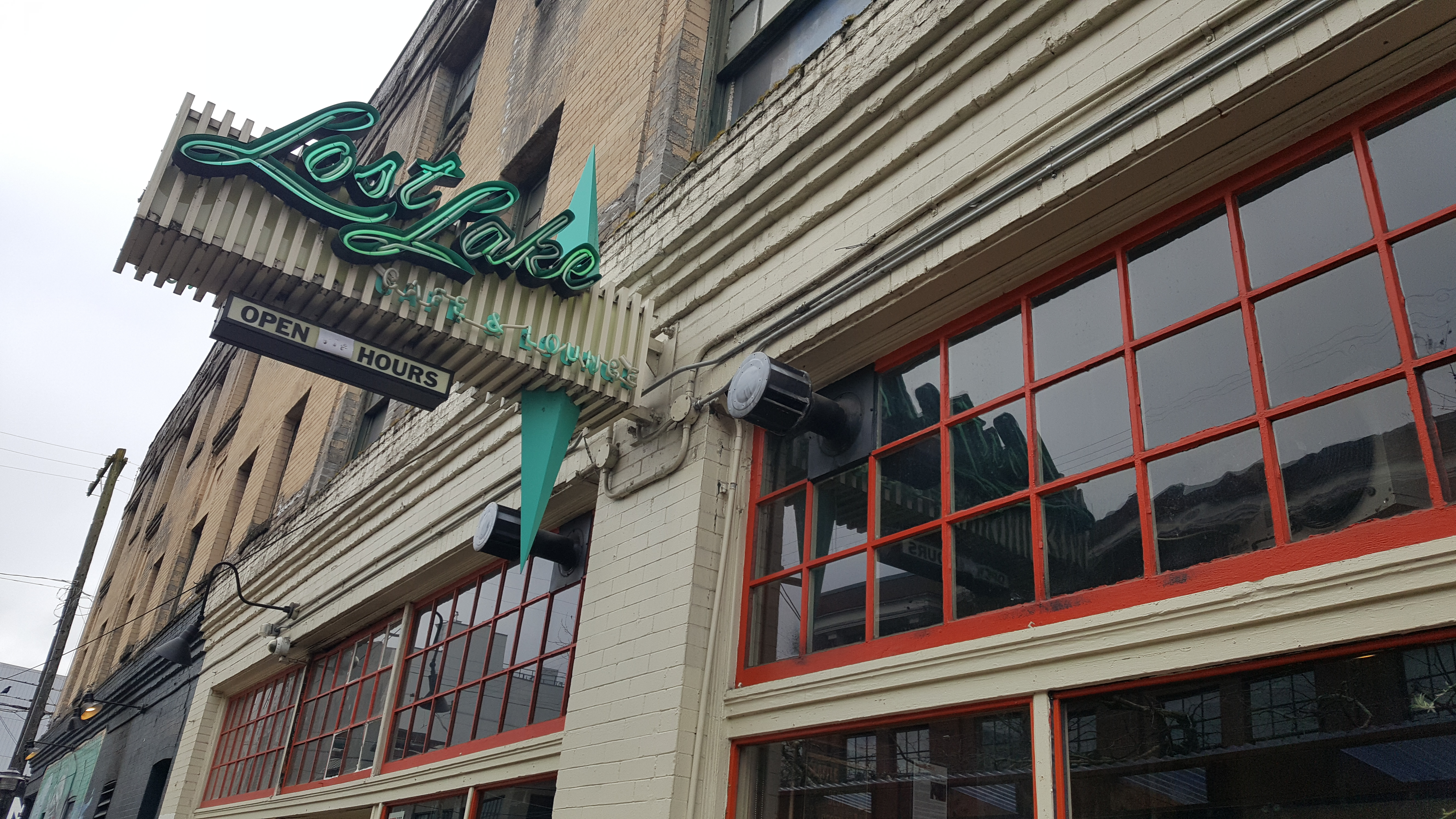
- The restaurant's exterior in 2022
- Interactive map of Lost Lake Cafe and Lounge

Restaurant information
- Established: 2013
- Food type: American; New American
- Location: 1505 10th Avenue, Seattle, Washington, 98122, United States
- Coordinates: 47°36′51.8″N 122°19′10.7″W
- Website: lostlakecafe.com

Lost Lake Cafe and Lounge is a diner in Seattle's Capitol Hill neighborhood, in the U.S. state of Washington.

== Description ==
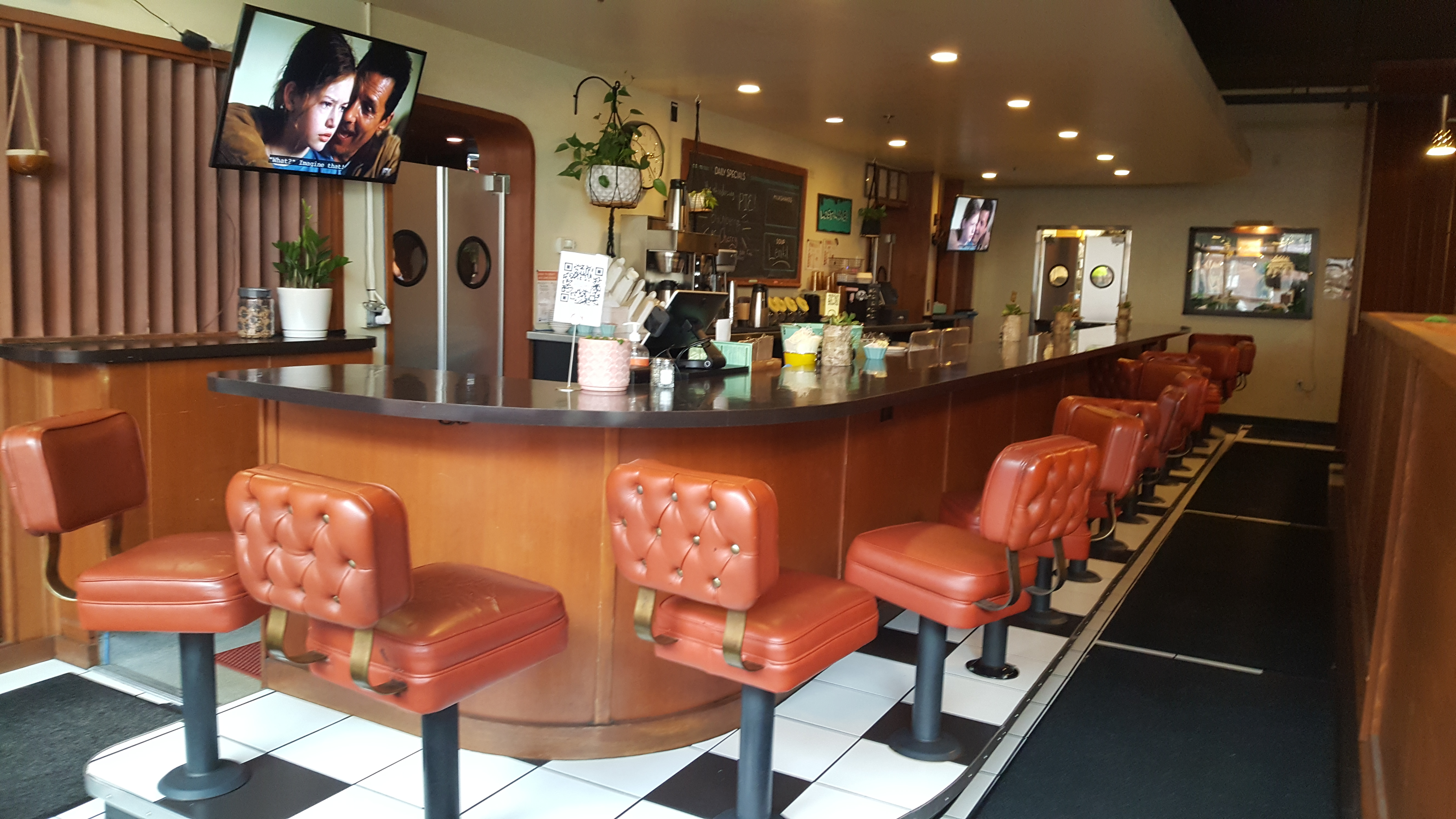
The restaurant's interior, 2022

Lost Lake Cafe and Lounge is a 3,000 square foot diner in Capitol Hill. In 2013, Bradley Foster of Thrillist wrote, "Inside, Lost Lake is stylishly lost in time, its space dominated by an old-school diner-style bar and clad in '60s-era decor ranging from faux wood paneling to chandeliers the Jetsons would love."

The breakfast menu, served all day, includes benedicts, fried chicken and buttermilk biscuits, pancakes, and vegan hash. Lunch and dinner options include meatloaf, sandwiches, tuna melts, and salads. The diner has also served skirt steak fajitas and eggnog French toast. For Thanksgiving, the diner has served cider-brined turkey, honey-glazed ham, and vegetarian lasagna. For Christmas, Lost Lake has served crab bisque, turkey, and mulled wine with brandy.

== History ==
The restaurant opened in 2013. Lost Lake was operated by David Meinert and Jason Lajeunesse via Guild Seattle. Meinert sold his stake in 2018.

== Reception ==
Eater Seattle has included Lost Lake in lists of recommended eateries for Thanksgiving and Christmas, and for watching the Super Bowl. The website's Julia Wayne and Dylan Joffe included the diner in a 2017 list of "The Top Wi-Fi-Equipped Cafes to Work Remotely in Seattle".

== See also ==
- List of diners
- List of New American restaurants
