= Hey Meatball =

Defunct diner in Toronto, Ontario, Canada

Restaurant information
- Owner: Rodney Bowers
- Chef: Rodney Bowers
- Location: Toronto, Ontario, Canada

Hey Meatball was a diner in Toronto, Ontario, Canada. Rodney Bowers was the owner and chef. The restaurant was Toronto's first to be featured on the Food Network series Diners, Drive-Ins and Dives.

== See also ==
- List of diners
- List of Diners, Drive-Ins and Dives episodes
- List of restaurants in Canada
