= Patrician Grill =

Defunct diner in Toronto, Ontario, Canada

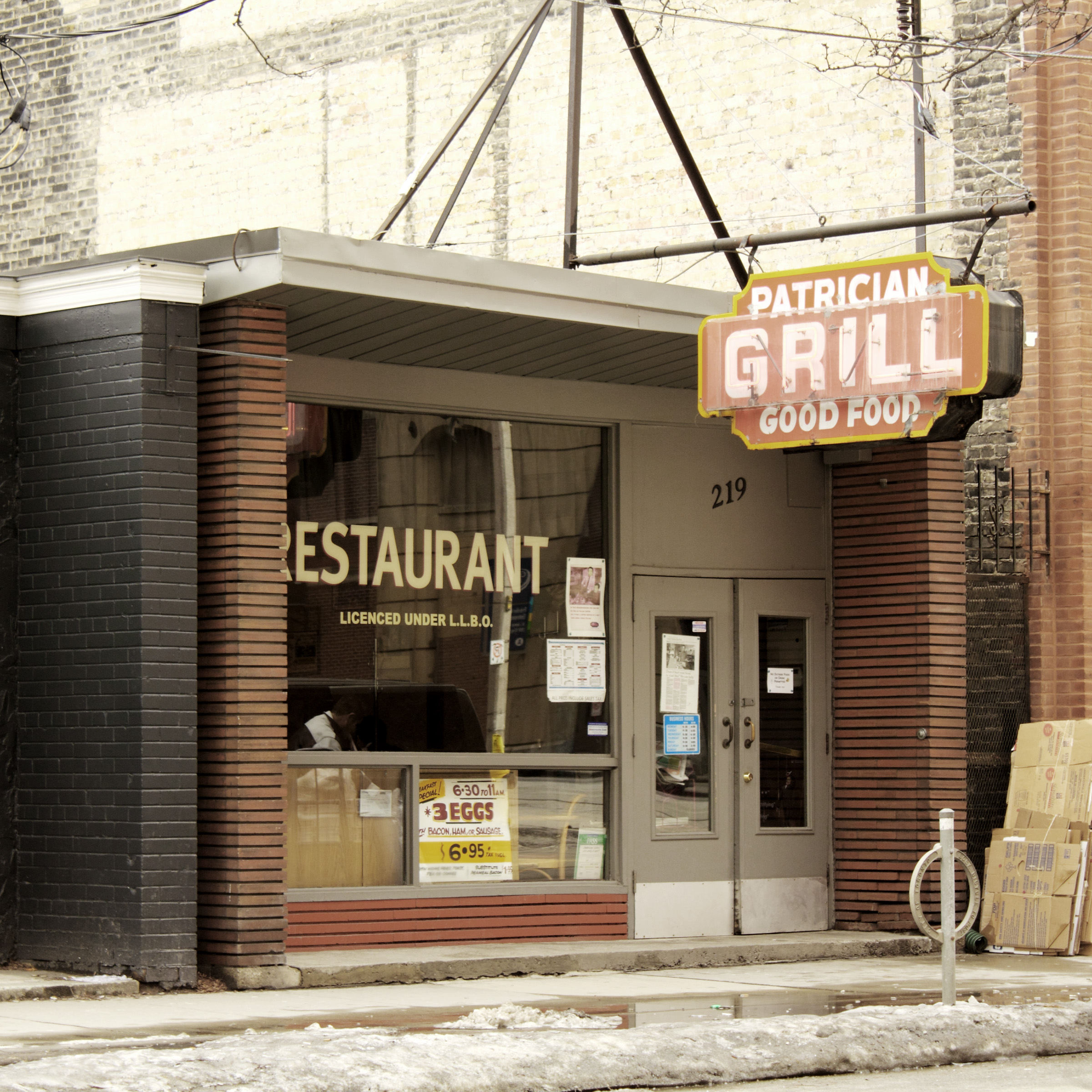
- The restaurant's exterior, 2011

Restaurant information
- Location: Toronto, Ontario, Canada

Patrician Grill was a diner in Toronto, Ontario, Canada. Terry Papas and Chris Slifkas were co-owners.

== See also ==
- List of diners
- List of restaurants in Canada
