= Central Diner =

- Central Diner: Paula's Kitchen; Elmwood Diner; Liberty Elm Diner; Worcester Lunch Car Company Diner #806
- U.S. National Register of Historic Places
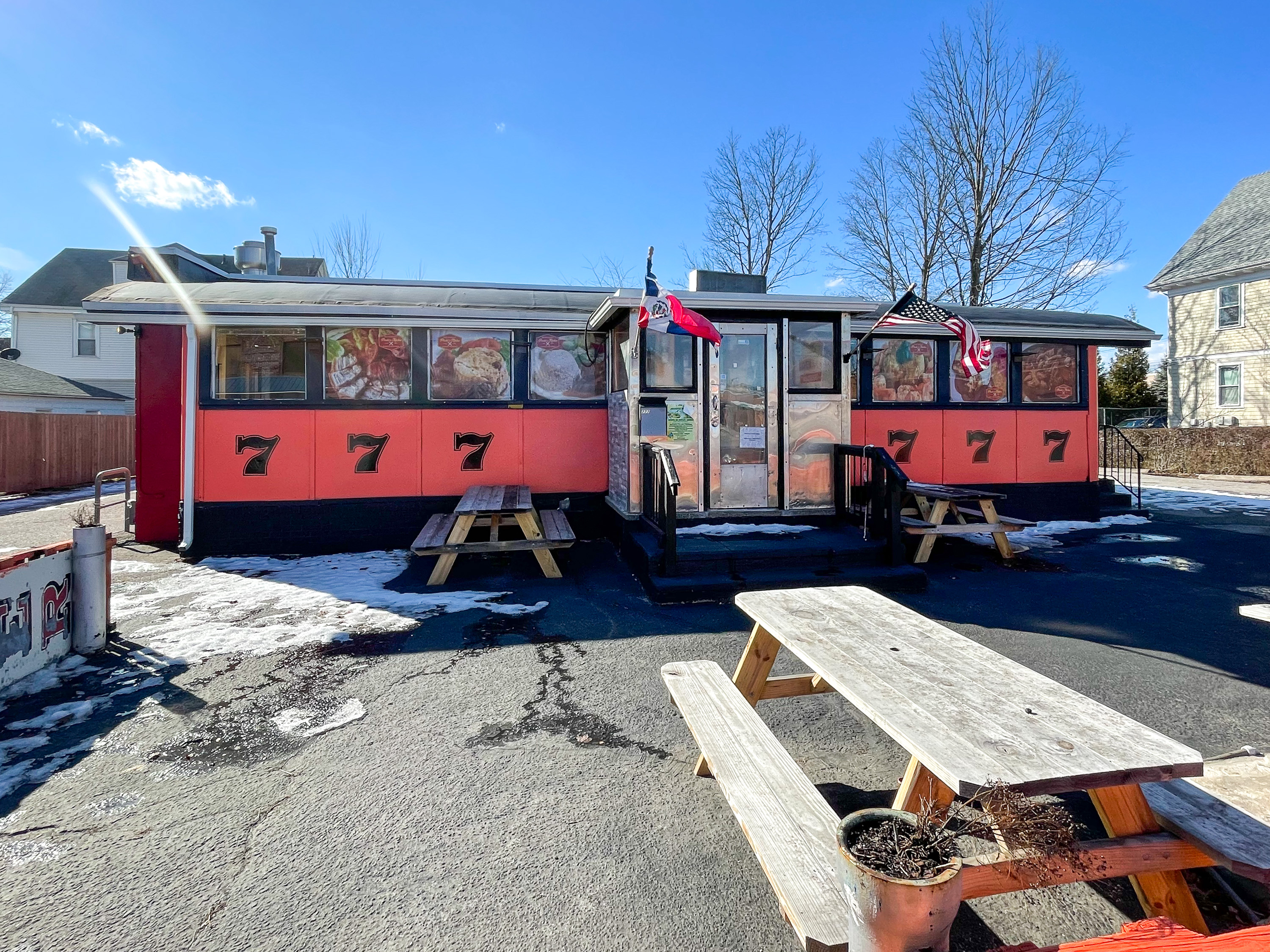

- Location within Rhode Island
- Location: 777 Elmwood Ave., Providence, Rhode Island
- Coordinates: 41°47′27.6894″N 71°25′21.1728″W
- Area: .23 acres (0.093 ha)
- NRHP reference No.: 09001231
- Added to NRHP: January 13, 2010

The Central Diner's different looks

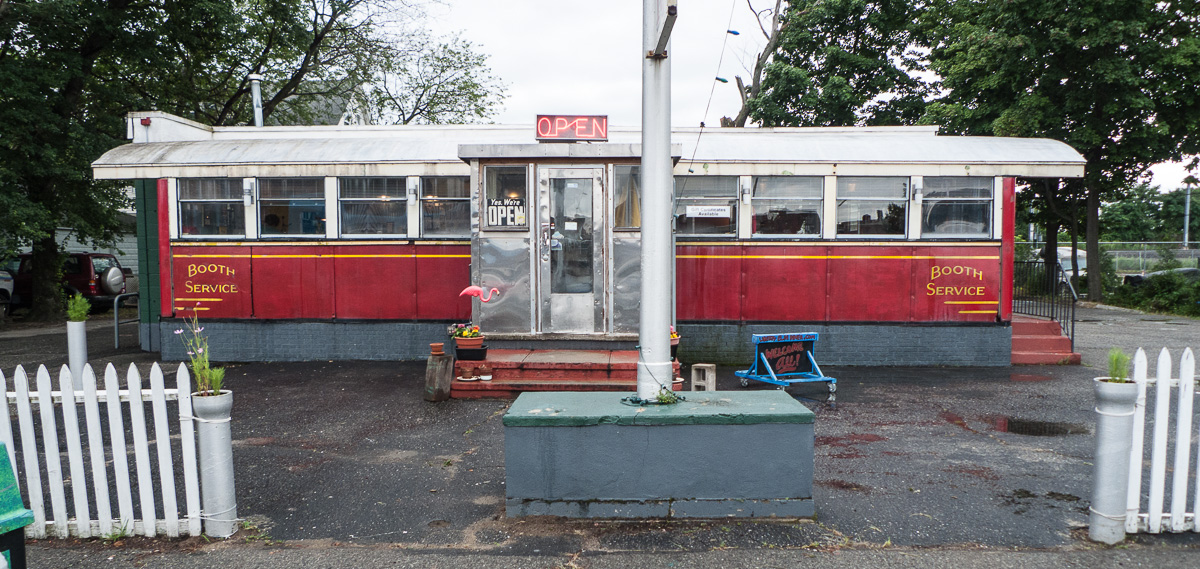
In 2012, as "Liberty Elm Diner"

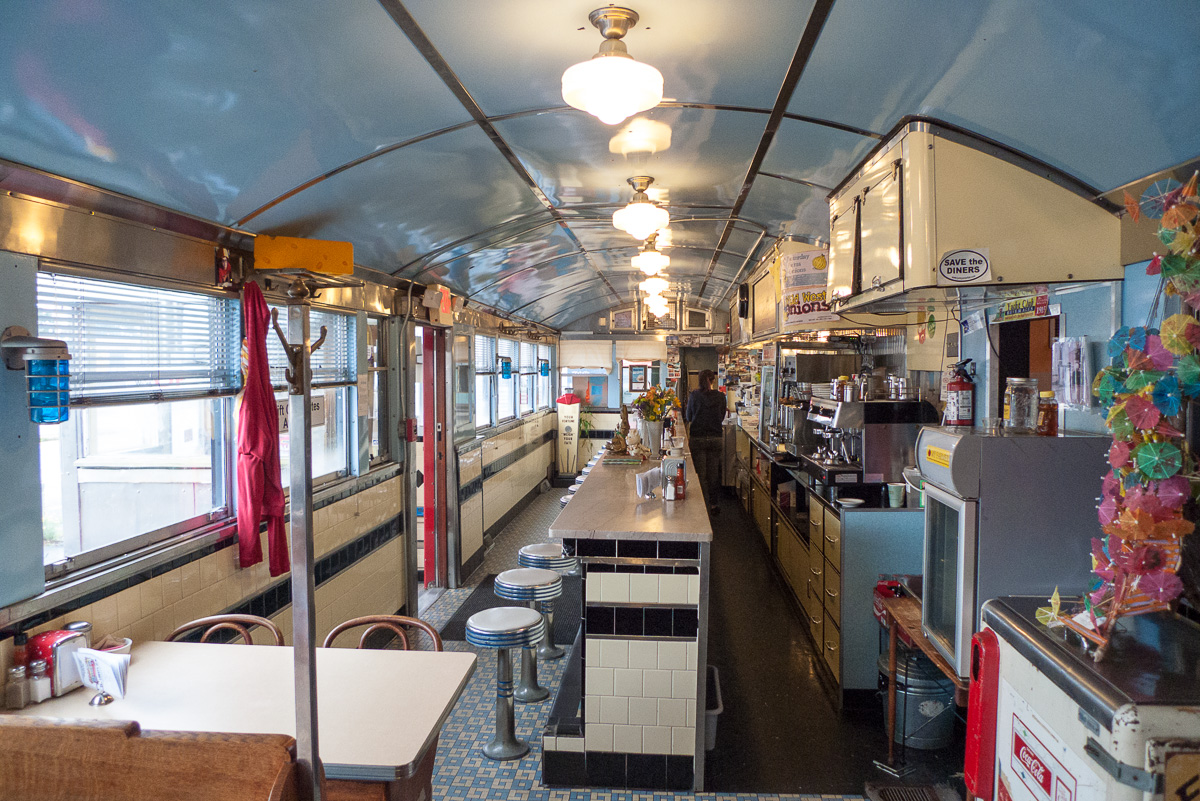
interior in 2012

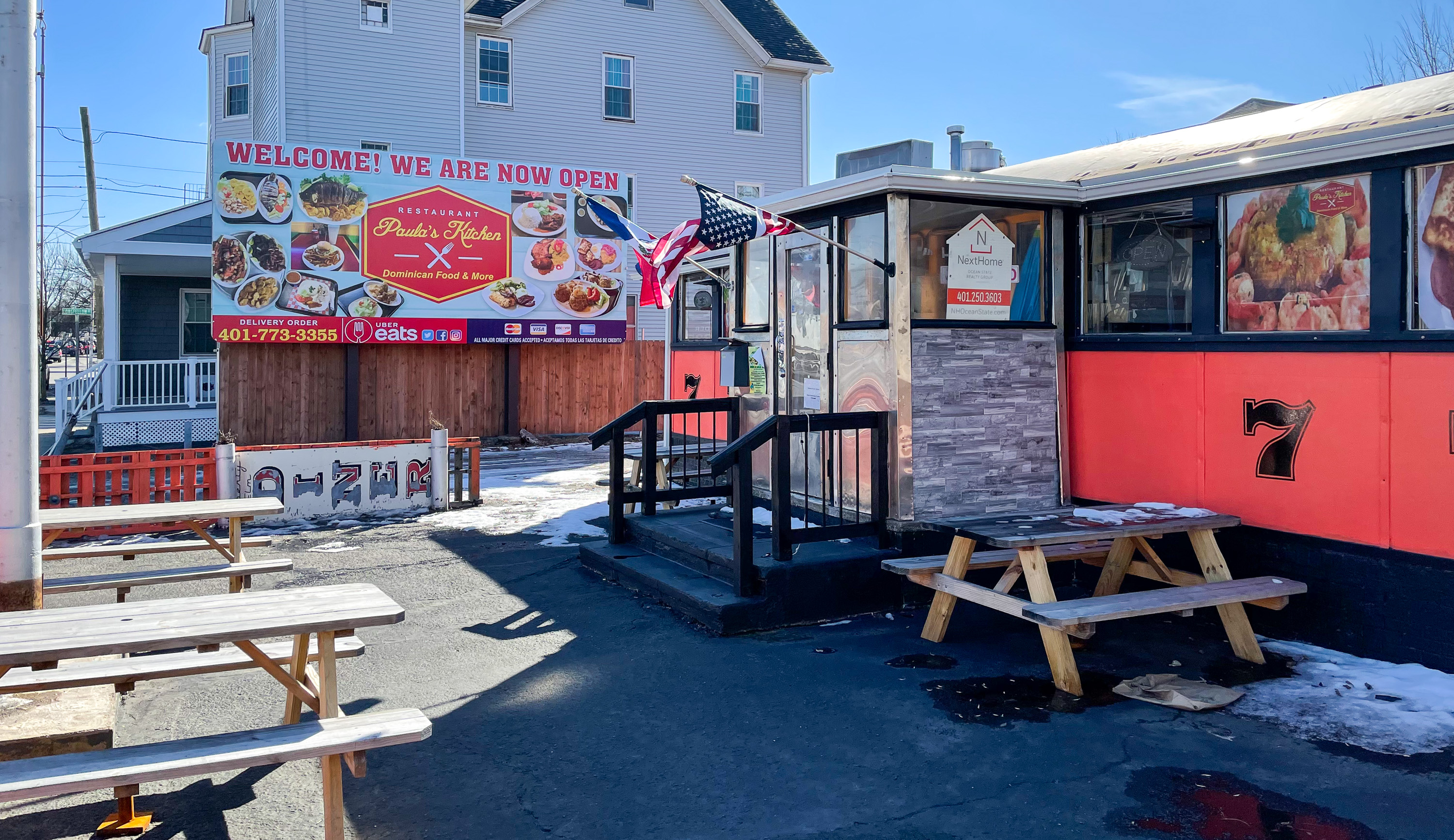
In 2021, as "Paula's Kitchen, Dominican Food and More"

The Central Diner, also called Paula's Kitchen and formerly known as The Elmwood Diner, Liberty Elm Diner, Jenn's Elmwood Diner, Ole Elmwood Diner, or Worcester Lunch Car Company Diner #806, is a historic Worcester Lunch Car Company diner at 777 Elmwood Avenue in Providence, Rhode Island.

== Description ==
The diner was built in 1947 by the Worcester Lunch Car Company as #806. It is a single story prefabricated structure, 10'6" wide and 40' long. At the ends of the diner the barrel roof has an overhang of three feet. There are entries at the north end (one of the original entrances) and in a projecting stainless steel vestibule on the eastern facade. The original southern entry is obscured by the cinderblock wall of the kitchen addition which projects to the diner's rear. The interior is well-preserved, with little alteration since its construction.

== History ==
The diner was first located at West Gaspee and Exchange Streets, a site which housed businesses known as the "Central Diner" since at least 1932. It was moved to its present location in 1953 or 1954, retaining the name. It is one of four Worcester Lunch Car Company diners (out of what was once a much larger number) still operating in Rhode Island.

The diner went through a number of names and owners over its lifetime. A cinderblock kitchen was added in 1953, after it was moved to Elmwood Avenue. A stainless steel vestibule at the front was added some time between 1956 and the 1970s. Wooden siding was added sometime between 1995 and 2002.

=== Liberty Elm and Elmwood Diner ===
The diner operated as the Liberty Elm Diner from 2006 to 2013. The building was listed on the U.S. National Register of Historic Places on January 13, 2010. The listing was announced as the featured listing in the National Park Service's weekly list of January 22, 2010. On February 22, 2010, the diner made an appearance on the Guy Fieri television program “Diners, Drive-Ins and Dives”.

In 2021, a local publication called the diner "one of the best neighborhood joints in Rhode Island."

The Liberty Elm was sold in May 2013 and re-opened as Elmwood Diner in April 2014. The diner closed and was listed for sale in April 2017.

=== Paula's Kitchen ===
The diner re-opened in August 2020, during the COVID-19 pandemic, as "Paula's Kitchen," serving "Dominican food and more." The restyled restaurant featured outdoor seating and a new look with an orange-and-black paint (where the previous design had been red and white), and giant black numbers "777" on the facade. In January 2021 Paula's Kitchen announced on Instagram that they were closing and the diner was once again listed for sale.

== See also ==
- List of diners
- National Register of Historic Places listings in Providence, Rhode Island
