= Donwell's Diner-Worcester Lunch Car Company Diner No. 774 =

- U.S. National Register of Historic Places
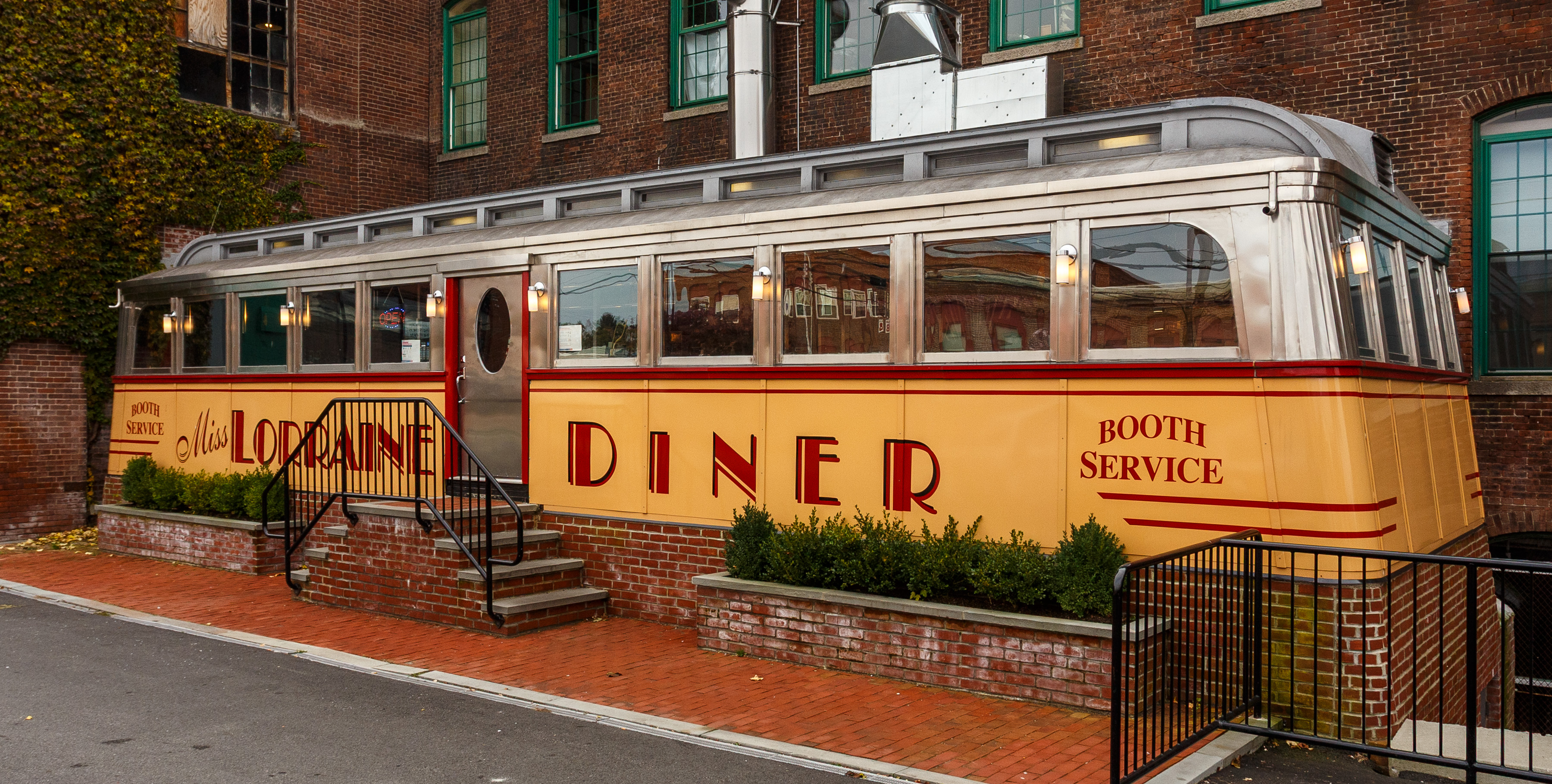
- 2021

- Location within Rhode Island Location within the United States
- Location: 560 Mineral Springs Ave., Pawtucket, Providence County, Rhode Island
- Coordinates: 41.8729°N 71.4064°W
- Area: .02 acres (0.0081 ha)
- Built: 1941
- Built by: Worcester Lunch Car Company
- NRHP reference No.: 100007075
- Added to NRHP: October 25, 2021

The Donwell's Diner-Worcester Lunch Car Company Diner No. 774 or Miss Lorraine Diner is a historic dining car located at 560 Mineral Springs Avenue (Rhode Island Route 15) in Pawtucket, Rhode Island, although much of the diner's existence has been in Connecticut. Through various new locations and owners, it has also been known as Squeak's Diner, as Drake's Diner, as Donovan's Diner, and as The Hotel Diner.

== History ==
The diner was originally known as Donwell's Diner in Hartford, Connecticut. This is a Worcester Streamliner dining car built in 1941 by the Worcester Lunch Car Company, and was located at 357 Asylum Avenue in Hartford, Connecticut across from the Hotel Bond. The name was said to be a portmanteau of the owners' names, J. Edward & Edith Donnellan and Chester L. Wells. In the summer of 1949, it was bought by Elliot Drake and John J. Hibben, and renamed as Drake's Diner. Drake was arrested in 1953 for failing to pay his employees, and the diner was renamed as Donovan's Diner. By the mid-1950's it was bought by George Swan, and renamed The Hotel Diner.

In 1956, the diner was auctioned off and moved to Kensington, Connecticut, where it remained inoperative for a decade. In 1969, it was bought in another auction by Ida and Stanley “Squeak” Zawisa, who moved it to 190 East Main Street in Middletown, Connecticut, where it operated as Squeak's Diner until 1997.

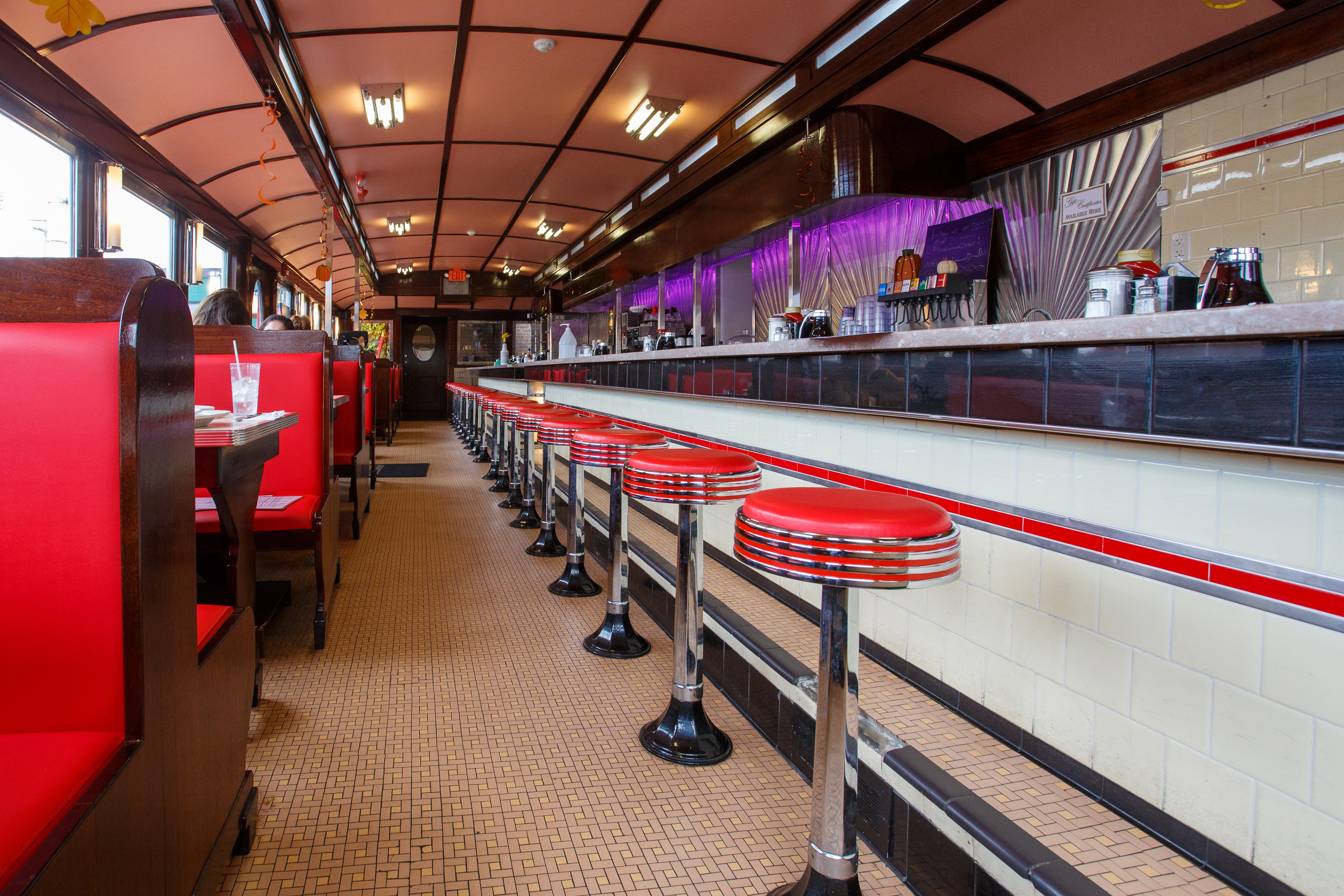
Interior, in 2021

The diner was purchased by filmmaker and diner enthusiast Colin Strayer in October 2003, who intended to move it to temporary storage near his home in Syracuse, New York. Discovered in a field in Middletown as part of another failed restoration attempt, it was later sold to another diner enthusiast named Jonathan Savage, who then moved it to Pawtucket at the Lorraine Mills Textile Manufacturing Complex along RI 15, where it remained dormant for more than nine years before opening on January 28, 2020.

It was listed on the National Register of Historic Places in 2021.
