= Paris Coffee Shop =

- Interactive map of Paris Coffee Shop

Restaurant information
- Established: 1926
- Food type: American cuisine
- Location: 704 West Magnolia Ave, Fort Worth, Texas

Paris Coffee Shop is a diner in Fort Worth, Texas. It was founded in 1926 by Vic Paris.

== Description ==
The restaurant has mid-century themed decor and booth seating. It is known as a diner and lunch room. The restaurant is known for serving pies, chicken and dumplings, and blue-plate specials.

== History ==
The restaurant is one of the oldest in Fort Worth. It was founded in 1926 by Vic Paris. He sold it to Grigonos "Greg" Asikis. Asikis had immigrated from Greece to the United States when he was a teenager and worked as a dishwasher. He changed his surname to "Greg Smith" to avoid discrimination. He bought the Paris Coffee Shop from Vic Paris in 1930.

In 1965, Greg became ill and his son Mike Smith took over management of the restaurant. Mike had been studying for a master's degree at University of North Texas when Greg began to suffer from Parkinson's disease, which led Mike to return and help at the restaurant. In 1974, Mike moved the restaurant a block west of its original location on Magnolia Avenue and Hemphill Street, into a former Safeway grocery store building.

In 2021, Mike Smith retired and sold the restaurant to Lou Lambert, Chris Reale, and Mark Harris. They renovated the restaurant based on historical photos of the original location.
