= Landrum's Hamburger System No. 1 =

- U.S. National Register of Historic Places
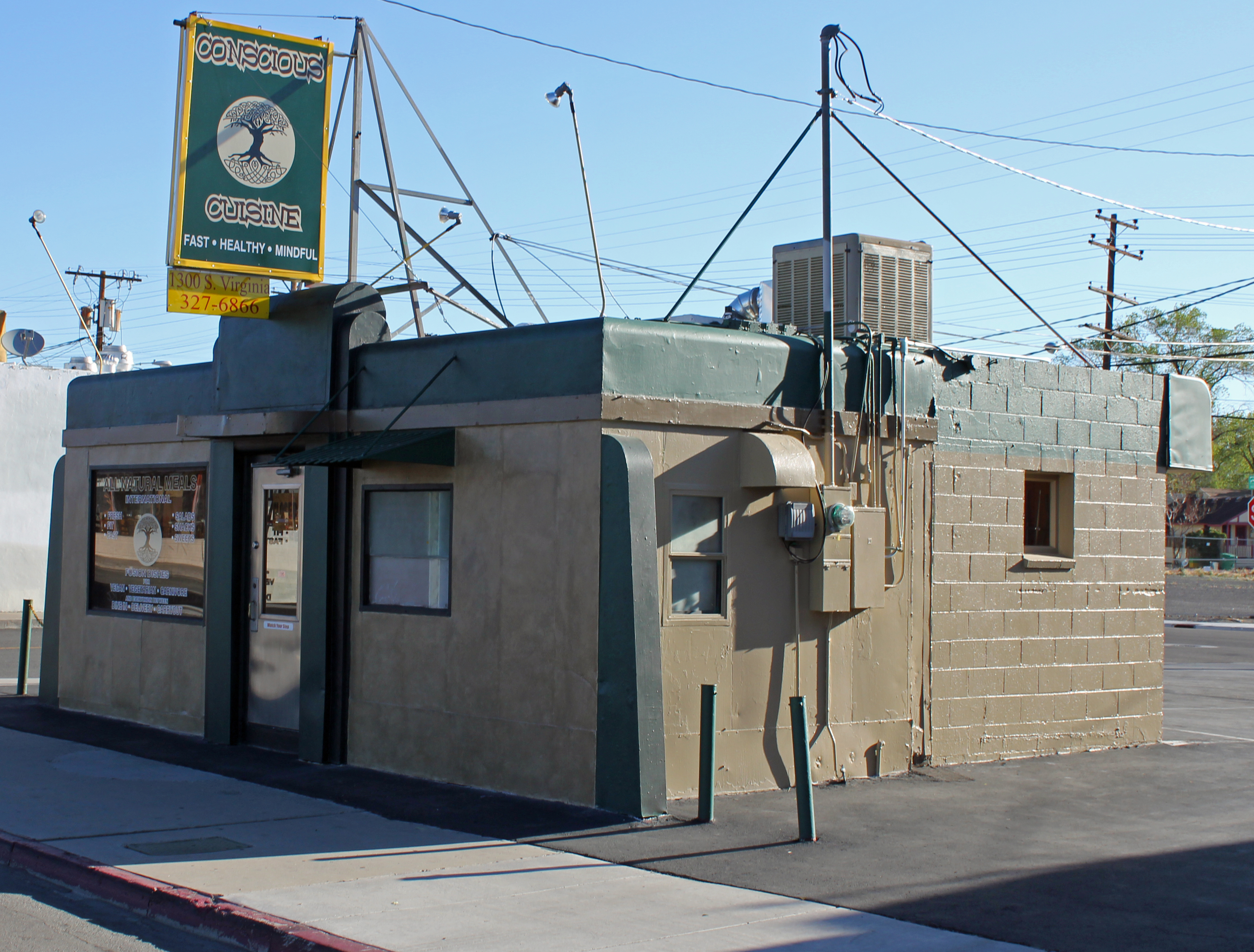

- Location within Nevada Location within the United States
- Location: 1300 S. Virginia St., Reno, Nevada
- Coordinates: 39°30′42″N 119°48′17″W
- Area: less than one acre
- Built: 1947
- Built by: Valentine Manufacturing Inc.
- Architectural style: Moderne
- NRHP reference No.: 98001303
- Added to NRHP: October 30, 1998

The Landrum's Hamburger System No. 1, at 1300 S. Virginia St. in Reno, Nevada, USA, was built in 1947. It was a Moderne style building that has also been known as Chili Cheez Cafe. It was listed on the National Register of Historic Places in 1998. The building has since been occupied by Beefy's Burgers. The building encloses 400 square feet (37 m^{2}) of floor space.

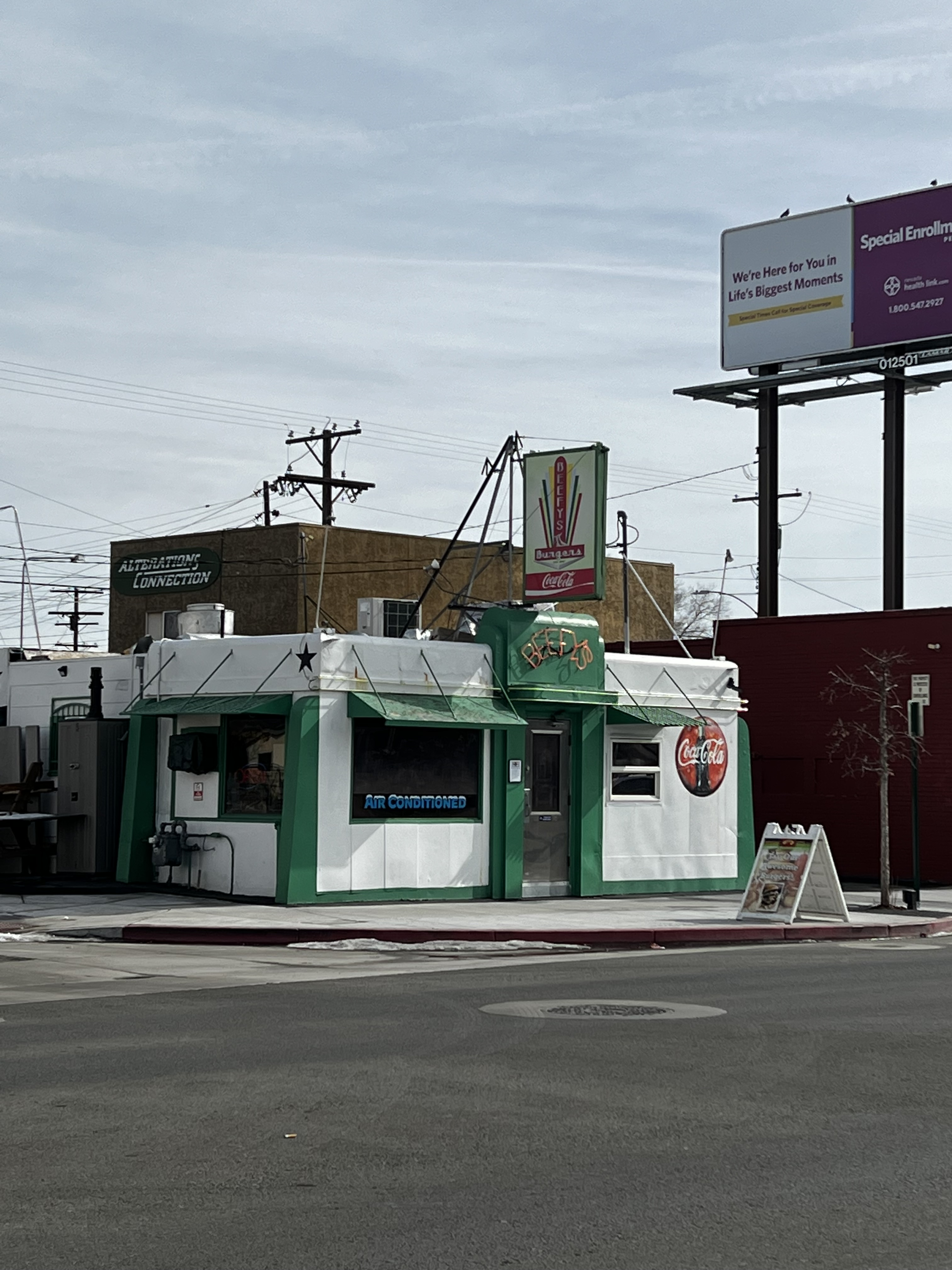
Beefy’s restaurant from the other side of South Virginia St.

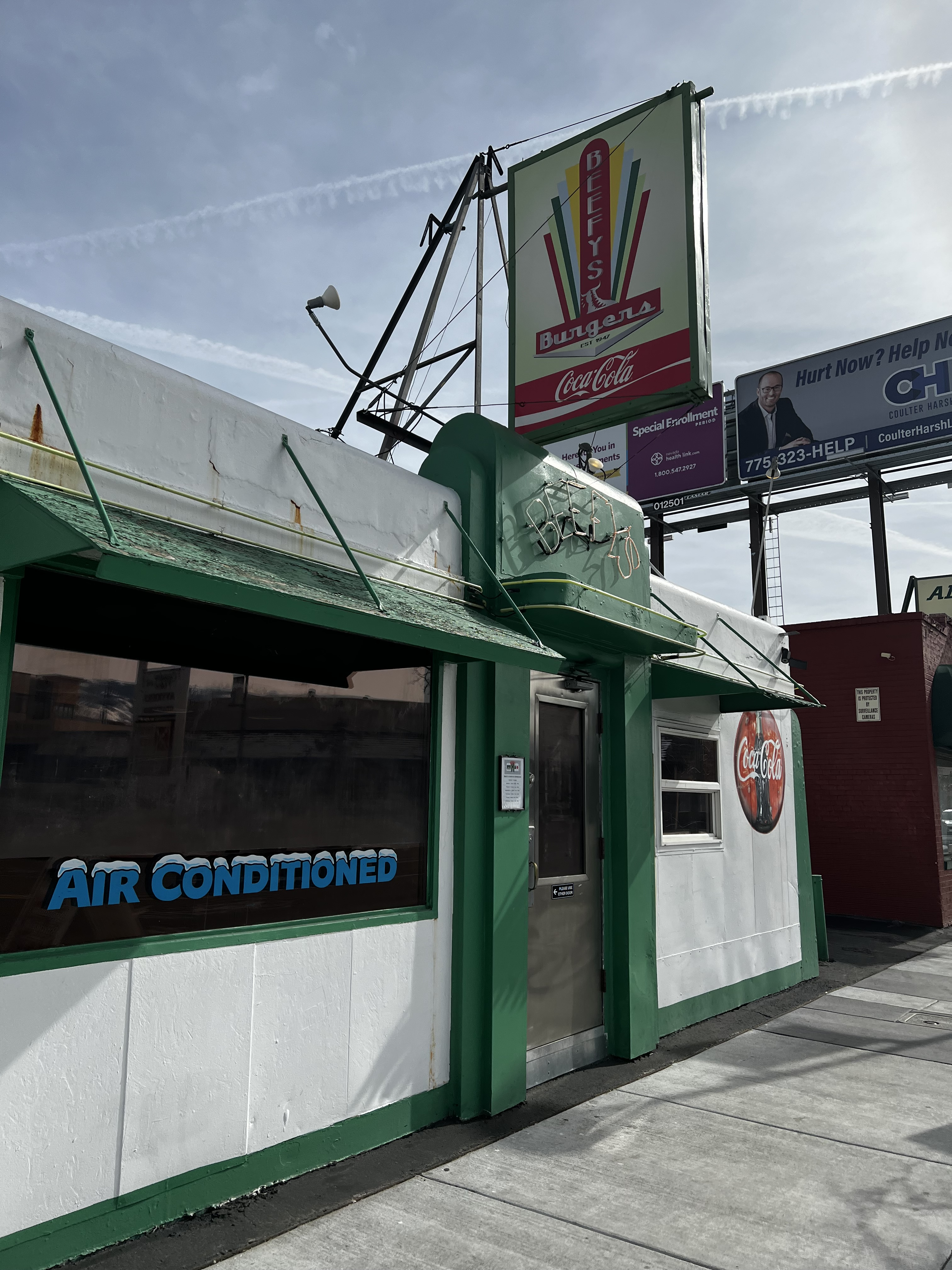
Beefy’s as seen from the sidewalk on South Virginia Street.
