= Chadwick Square Diner =

- U.S. National Register of Historic Places
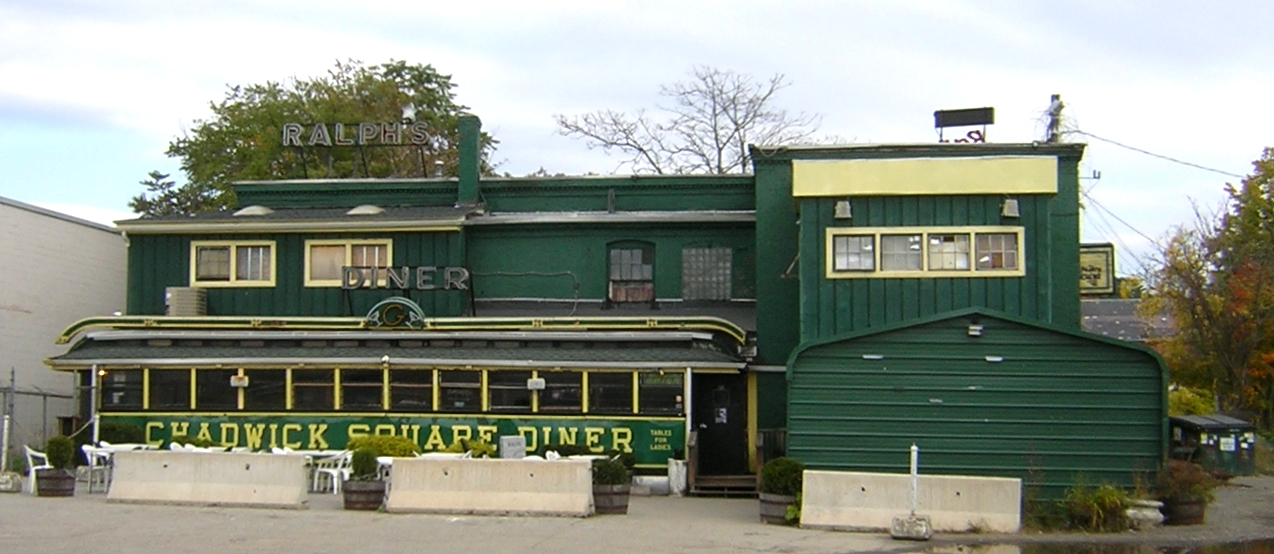

- Location within Massachusetts Location within the United States
- Location: 95 rear Prescott St., Worcester, Massachusetts
- Coordinates: 42°16′39.4″N 71°48′4″W
- Area: less than one acre
- Architect: Worcester Lunch Car Co.
- Architectural style: Rail Car Diner
- MPS: Diners of Massachusetts MPS
- NRHP reference No.: 03001206
- Added to NRHP: November 26, 2003

The Chadwick Square Diner or Worcester Lunch Car Company Diner #660 or Ralph's Chadwick Square Diner is an historic diner at 95 Prescott Street (rear) in Worcester, Massachusetts. Although the building faces Grove Street, it is attached to one of the 19th century Washburn and Moen Works buildings which fronts on Prescott Street. The diner is a rare early version of a streetcar-inspired design, and may be the only one of its type in the state. It is 40 feet (12 m) long and 14 feet (4.3 m) deep, with twelve window bays. It has a monitor-style roof with clerestory windows, and entrances at the ends under roof overhangs. The northern entrance now serves as an emergency exit, while the south entrance now serves as the main entrance to the nightclub in the attached building. The interior is exceptionally well-preserved, retaining many of its original finishes.

The diner was built by Worcester Lunch Car Company in 1930 for Robert and Mamie Gilhooly of Worcester, who operated it at 414 Grove Street. The neon "G" on the front of the diner stands for Gilhooly. It was first located in the Chadwick Square section of Worcester and was a popular place.

Robert Gilhooly died in 1955, after which the diner was purchased by his cousin Mary Ryan Clingen and her husband James Clingen of Cherry Valley. It was then moved near to the Worcester-Leicester line, and was operated at 1546 Main Street by their son-in-law and daughter, Ralph and Eileen Dryden.

The diner was later sold to Ralph Moberly and moved to its present location in 1979. It was listed on the National Register of Historic Places in 2003.

== See also ==
- National Register of Historic Places listings in northwestern Worcester, Massachusetts
- National Register of Historic Places listings in Worcester County, Massachusetts
