= Pie 'n Burger =

Diner in Pasadena, California

- Interactive map of Pie 'n Burger

Restaurant information
- Established: 1963; 63 years ago
- Owner: Michael Osborne
- Previous owners: Benny and Florence Foote
- Food type: Hamburgers, breakfast and brunch
- Location: 913 E. California Boulevard, Pasadena, California, 91106, United States
- Coordinates: 34°08′10″N 118°07′53″W
- Website: www.pienburger.com

Pie 'n Burger is a diner in Pasadena, California. It was founded in 1963 and is noted for serving hamburgers and pies.

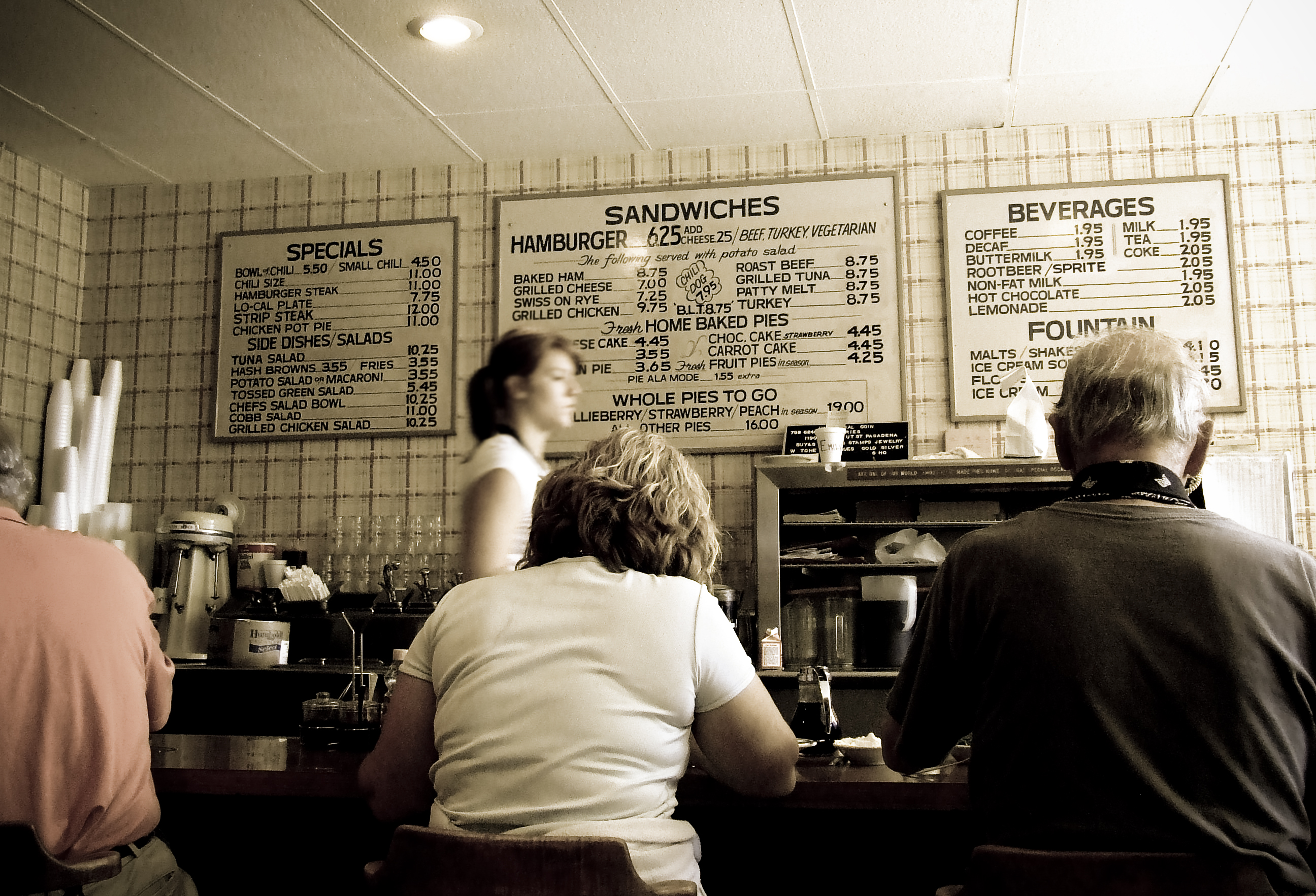
Pie 'n Burger counter in 2008.

== Description ==
The diner retains its original decor from the 1960s, with formica countertops, wood-paneled walls, and plaid wallpaper. It still uses a mechanical cash register, and has a hand-painted menu on the wall. Most customers are seated at the counter, as the restaurant has a small number of tables.

The restaurant is known for serving hamburgers and pies. Its standard hamburger is a quarter-pound beef patty on a white bun, topped with Thousand Island dressing, pickles, onions, and iceberg lettuce. It serves several types of pie including pecan pie, apple pie, chocolate meringue, and butterscotch pie. It also serves seasonal pies, including blackberry, peach, and strawberry pie in the summer and mincemeat pie in winter. Its menu also has sandwiches, milkshakes, steaks, omelets, and other breakfast dishes.

The restaurant has been described as a "legend" in the Pasadena community. The restaurant has historically drawn large numbers of customers from different backgrounds, being "one of the few places anywhere where a truck driver, a socialite and a Nobel Prize-winning chemist might sit side by side." In EAT: Los Angeles (2008), it was noted to be popular with "Caltech students and profs, older couples, paperback-toting singles". Kit Rachlis described its varied clientele in 2005: "Construction crews in spattered overalls sit next to white-haired patricians in bow ties and suspenders. Pale-faced Goths in combat boots squeeze in next to families with immaculately turned-out children and $1,000 strollers."

== History ==
The restaurant was founded by Benny and Florence Foote in 1963, at 913 E. California Boulevard in Pasadena, California. Since its founding, the restaurant has served hamburgers with Thousand Island dressing using a recipe that Benny got from the Kraft Foods Inc. in the 1930s.

The restaurant is currently owned by Michael Osborne, who began working at the restaurant as a cook in 1972 while studying at University of Southern California. Osborne had first eaten at the restaurant the year that it opened in 1963, when he was nine years old. He continued to work at the restaurant after graduating from USC and bought a part of the business in the late 1970s. He purchased the entire restaurant from the Footes in 1992 so that they could retire.

== Reception ==
The restaurant has been included on numerous lists of the best restaurants in Los Angeles. Nick Solares compared its style of food to other Southern California restaurants like In-N-Out Burger, and wrote that Pie 'n Burger was "the most exulted example of the breed: in my experience it achieves an unmatched level of harmony and balance."

Jonathan Gold praised the restaurant in his book Counter Intelligence: Where to Eat in the Real Los Angeles, writing that it was "locally famous for its big omelets, its pancake breakfasts, its crisp, slightly oily hash browns."

Ed Levine included the restaurant on his list of the thirty best burgers, writing "If you could eat southern California history, it might taste like the perfectly greasy, American dream that is a sloppy Pie 'n Burger burger."
