= US 30 Diner =

Stainless steel diner west of York, Pennsylvania, U.S.

- Location within Pennsylvania

Restaurant information
- Established: 1951
- Closed: late 2019
- Owners: Sarah Parker and Rene Hernandez-Lxcoatl (2021)
- Previous owners: Elmer and Grace Paxton, and a sequence of 9 others
- Food type: Comfort
- Location: 4320 West Market Street, West York, York, Pennsylvania, 17408, United States
- Coordinates: 39.930159°N 76.815767°W
- Former names: Lee's Diner, Vicky's Diner

US 30 Diner, known until June 2018 as Lee's Diner and in 2018/2019 as Vicky's Diner, is a stainless steel diner on U.S. Route 30 in West York, York County in Pennsylvania. Originally opened in 1951, it went out of business in late 2019.

== History ==
The original establishment was famous for its pies which were for many years baked by Theresa Redding.

The diner was founded in 1951 by Elmer and Grace Paxton for their son Lee who was returning from military service. They bought a Mountain View prefabricated stainless steel diner (serial no. 301) and had it fitted to their house, which contains the kitchen.

As of May 2000, the diner was eligible for listing on the National Register of Historic Places.

After a series of inspection failures and dwindling business, the diner was leased in June 2018 to Teddy Petropoulos, who made improvements and re-opened the establishment the following month as Vicky's Diner, naming it after his youngest daughter. The diner ceased operations on August 3, 2019.

After reopening as US 30 Diner in September 2019, the property was again cited for several health code violations in November, and with a follow-up inspection given 90 days to "obtain or register with a food safety certification course".

In June 2021, the property was reported to have been sold within the prior three months to two buyers. The building was identified as having 2,934 square feet (272.6 m^{2}) on 1.34 acres (5,400 m^{2}) of land.

In April 2026, a restored neon sign for Lee's Diner was mounted for display at the York County History Center's Agricultural & Industrial Museum.
