= Road Island Diner =

- O'Mahony Dining Car No. 1107
- U.S. National Register of Historic Places
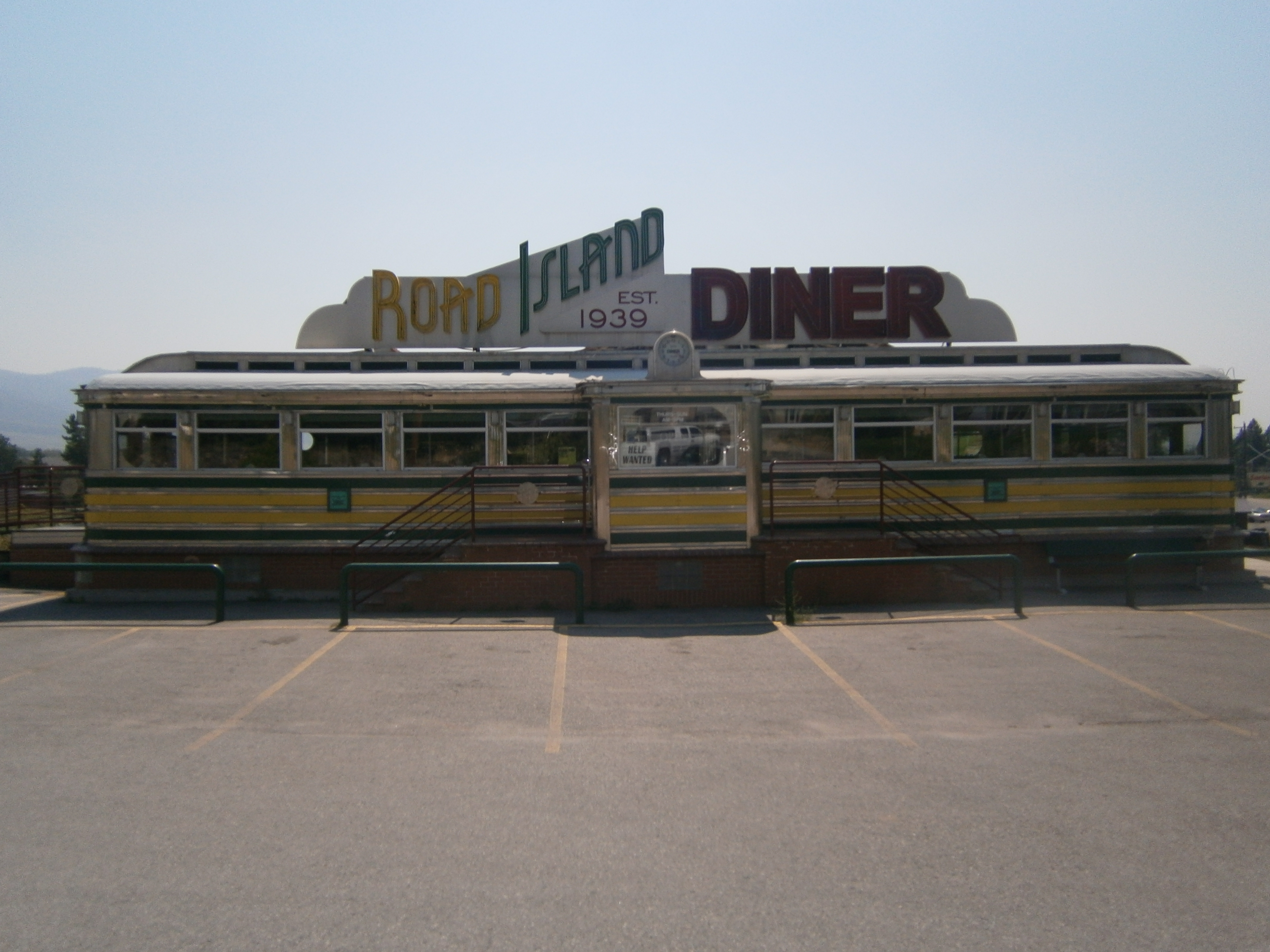

- Location within Utah
- Location: 981 W. Weber Canyon Rd., Oakley, Utah
- Coordinates: 40°42′58″N 111°18′0″W
- Built: 1939
- Architect: Jerry O'Mahony Diner Company
- Architectural style: Streamline Moderne
- NRHP reference No.: 09000639
- Added to NRHP: August 21, 2009

Road Island Diner
- Interactive map of Road Island Diner

Restaurant information
- Location: Oakley, Summit County, Utah, Utah, United States
- Website: Official website

The Oakley Diner, formerly known as The Road Island Diner is a rare classic Streamline Moderne 60' x 16' Art Deco diner car restaurant located in the remote mountain city of Oakley, Utah, in the United States. It was prefabricated as diner # 1107 in 1939 at the Elizabeth, New Jersey, factory of the Jerry O'Mahony Diner Company.

After construction, it was displayed on exhibition at the 1939 World's Fair in New York. After the Fair, It was sold to Al McDermott who had it towed it to Fall River, Massachusetts, where it operated for 14 years. In 1953, it was sold to Greek immigrant Tommy Borodemos, who had it transported down the turnpike to Middletown, Rhode Island, where it operated for four generations as Tommy's Deluxe Diner. It closed in May 2006 and was purchased in 2007 by Utah businessman, Keith Walker, who transported it to Oakley, Utah. After a year of restoration, it was opened in July 2008. It is said to be the only pre-war, Art-deco streamline (constructed to mimic a rail dining car) diner west of the Mississippi River.

Claimed to have been the "Cadillac" of diner companies because of its steel frame construction, The Jerry O'Mahony Diner Company of Elizabeth, New Jersey, whose motto was "In our line, We lead the world" was said to have produced 2,000 diners from 1917 to 1941 with only four pre-war Art-Deco streamline style diners to still be in operation. The smaller 50' x 10' Mickey's Diner serial # 1067 in Saint Paul, Minnesota, which is the first diner to be listed on the National Register of Historic Places, the 40' x 16' Collin's Diner serial # 1103 in North Canaan, CT and the 1938 Summit Diner in Summit, NJ. The Road Island Diner (O'Mahony Dining Car #1107) was added to the National Register of Historic Places by the National Park Service on August 21, 2009.

== See also ==
For other historic diners in the same architectural style see:

- Mickey's Diner in St. Paul, Minnesota
- Miss Albany Diner in Albany, New York
- Village Diner in Red Hook, New York
