= Miss Albany Diner =

Historic commercial building in New York, United States

- Tanpopo Ramen and Sake Bar (formerly Miss Albany Diner and Lil's Diner)
- U.S. National Register of Historic Places
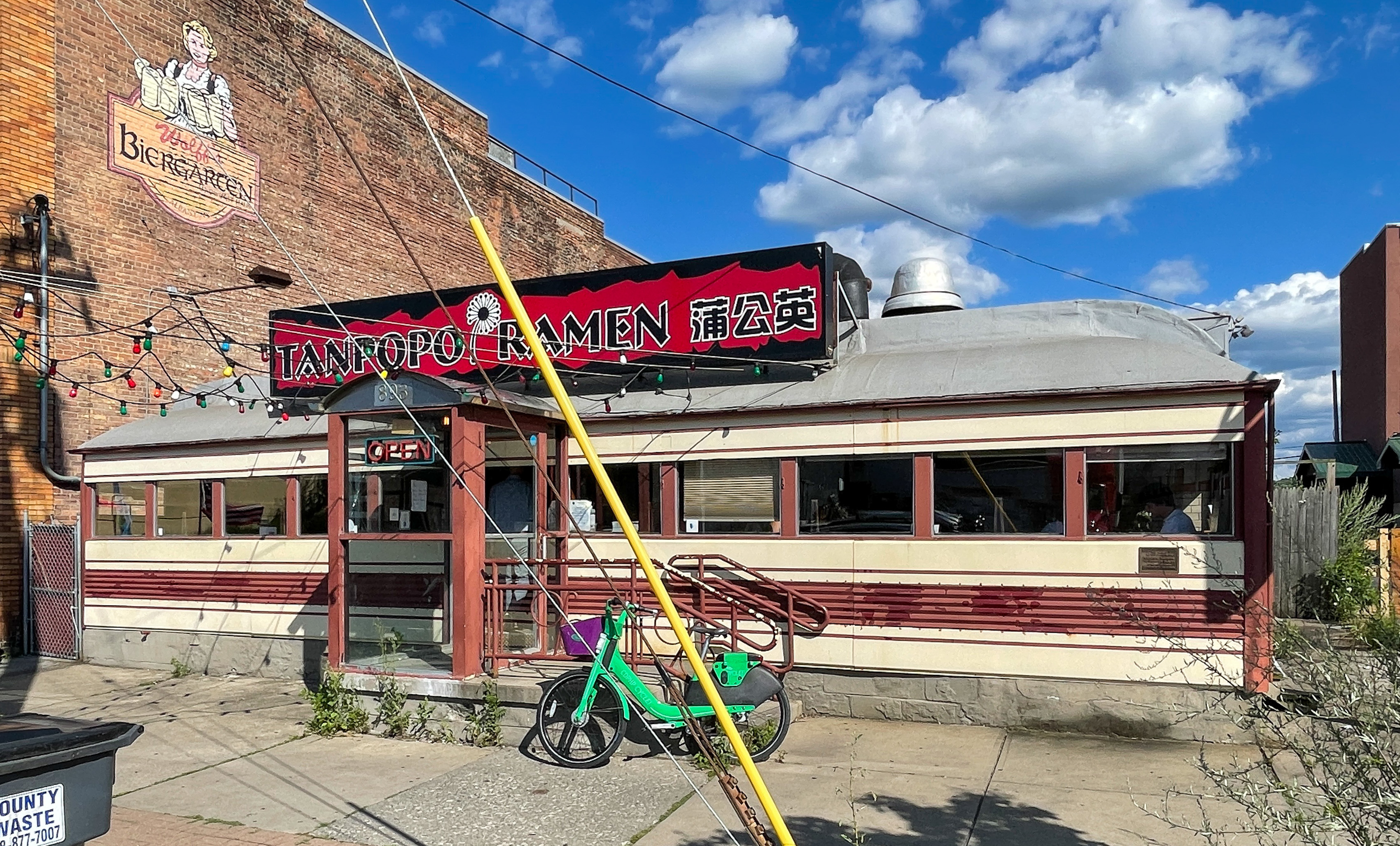
- Tanpopo Ramen and Sake Bar in 2021

- Location within New York Location within the United States
- Location: 893 Broadway, Albany, New York
- Coordinates: 42°39′46″N 73°44′41″W
- Built: 1941
- Architect: Silk City Diners division of Paterson Vehicle Company (Paterson, New Jersey)
- Architectural style: Art Deco
- NRHP reference No.: 00001278
- Added to NRHP: November 6, 2000

Tanpopo Ramen and Sake Bar (formerly known as Miss Albany Diner and Lil's Diner) is a historic diner in Albany, New York, built in 1941 and located at 893 Broadway, one of the oldest streets in Albany. Used as a set for the 1987 film Ironweed, which starred Jack Nicholson and Meryl Streep, it was added to the U.S. National Register of Historic Places in 2000.

== History ==
In 1929, the site was occupied by a lunch cart that provided hot food to workers in the area. It was succeeded by a prefabricated diner built by the Ward & Dickinson Dining Car Company. The current building was erected in 1941 and originally called Lil's Diner. It is a "Silk City Diner model, manufactured by the Paterson Vehicle Company in Paterson, New Jersey, one of the leading diner manufacturers of the time. The building is typical of the prefabricated diners that were common from the 1920s through the 1940s, built to resemble railroad cars and incorporating elements of Art Deco design. With its interior of cherry wood and porcelain enamelled steel and a geometrically tiled floor, it is one of the few pre-World War II diners in the United States in near-original condition. The interior was depicted by the photorealist artist Ralph Goings in his 1993 painting Miss Albany Diner.

The diner changed hands over the years and was called successively Elaine's, the Firehouse Diner, and the Street Car Diner. The "Miss Albany" name was shared by a chain of several now defunct Miss Albany Diners owned by Stillman Pitts which were popular in Albany during the 1920s, one of which (on Central Avenue) is explicitly mentioned in William Kennedy's novel Roscoe. When Kennedy's earlier novel Ironweed was made into a film in 1986, the diner was restored for use as one of the film's principal locations and given the name "Miss Albany Diner". At the time, a product placement bidding war ensued between Pepsi Cola and Coca-Cola over whose logo would be on the top of the diner.

=== Cliff Brown years ===
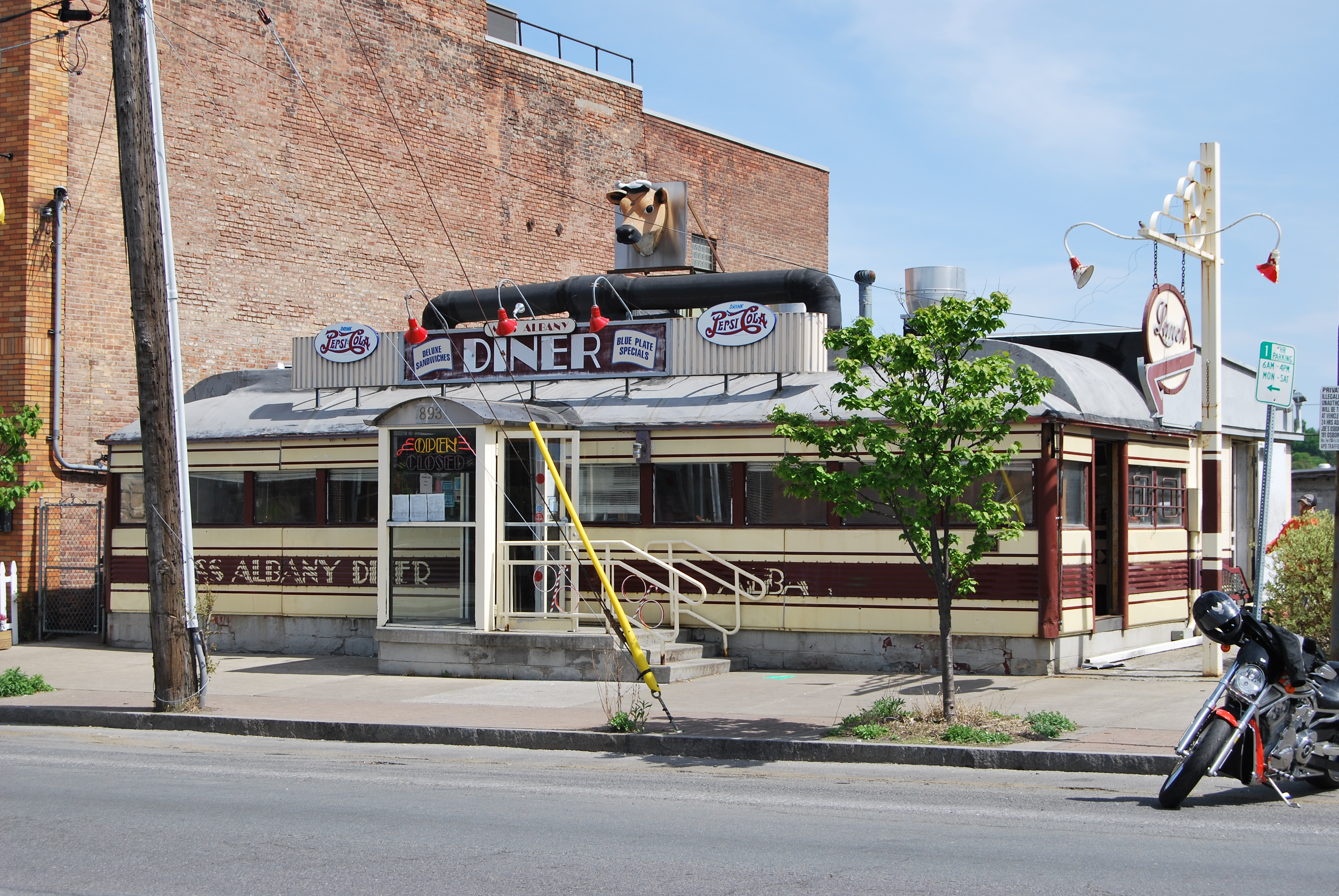
Miss Albany Diner in April 2010

In 1988, after the filming of Ironweed ended, the diner was bought by Cliff Brown and his wife Jane. Cliff Brown, a former Albany resident and retired insurance salesman for New York Life, gave it the name used in the film, which it has retained to the present day. At Brown's initiative, the building was listed on the U.S. National Register of Historic Places on November 6, 2000 and won a Preservation Merit Award in 2002 from the Historic Albany Foundation. In late 2009, Brown was 82 and wanted to retire. The diner was put up for sale, but as of 2010, it had still not been sold and continued to be run by Jane Brown.

The Miss Albany Diner served breakfast, lunch and coffee on a "cash only" basis and was open Tuesday through Sunday until 2:15 pm, with both waiter and take-out service. Its signature dishes included:

- Georgian Eggs (eggs any style over sweet potatoes and scallions and topped with peanut sauce)
- Mad Eggs (a toasted English muffin, topped with eggs, scallions and curry sauce)
- Calamity Jane (omelette with tomatoes, onions, peppers, swiss cheese, sausage and Tabasco sauce)
- Mad Irish Toast (two thick slices of French toast made from challah bread, filled with pecans and cream cheese and covered in a sauce made from Irish whiskey and butterscotch).

The dishes were created by the owners' son Bill Brown, who had been a chef at the diner for many years. Mad Irish Toast was named one of the "Best Bites of 2002" by the Chicago Sun-Times.

=== Later years ===
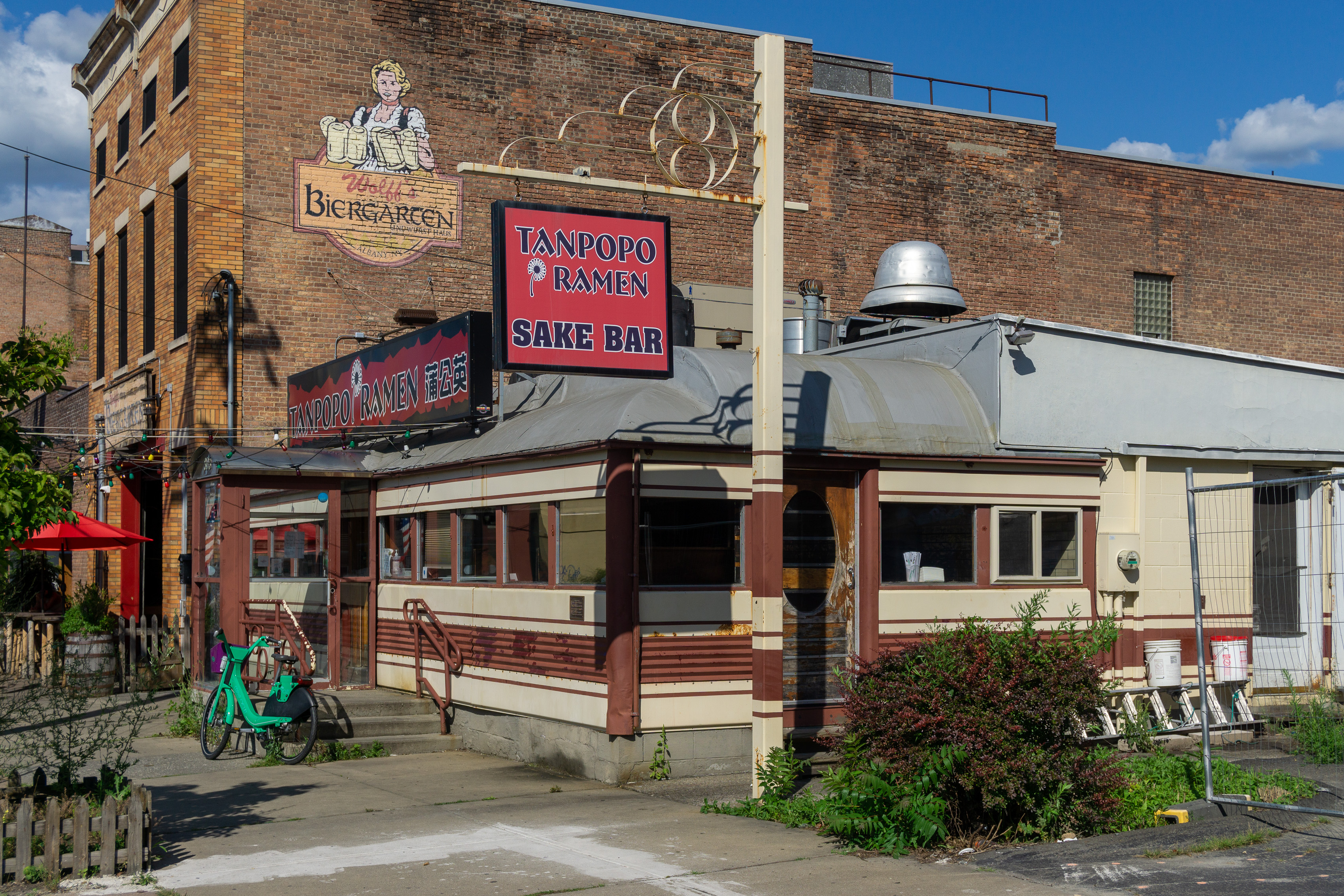
Tanpopo Ramen and Sake Bar in 2021

In February 2012, two years after Clifford Brown's death, the diner was purchased by Matthew Baumgartner, the head of a property company that owns a nearby beer garden and several other restaurants in Albany. Baumgartner said that the diner's structure would be retained when he and his partners develop the site, but that there were no plans to run it as a diner. Jane Brown and her son retained the rights to the "Miss Albany Diner" name and its signature recipes. The Miss Albany served its last meal as a diner on February 10, 2012.

In 2015, the diner re-opened under new owner David Zheng as Tanpopo Ramen and Sake Bar, with new booths, seating about 45 for lunch and dinner daily. Half of the counter remained at the original height, and half was raised to bar height with bar chairs.

== See also ==
- List of diners
- North Albany, Albany, New York
- Architecture of Albany, New York
- National Register of Historic Places listings in Albany, New York

For other historic diners in the same architectural style see:

- Mickey's Diner in St. Paul, Minnesota
- Road Island Diner in Oakley, Utah (previously sited in Middletown, Rhode Island and transported to Utah in 2007)
- Village Diner in Red Hook, New York
