= Village Diner =

- Halfway Diner
- U.S. National Register of Historic Places
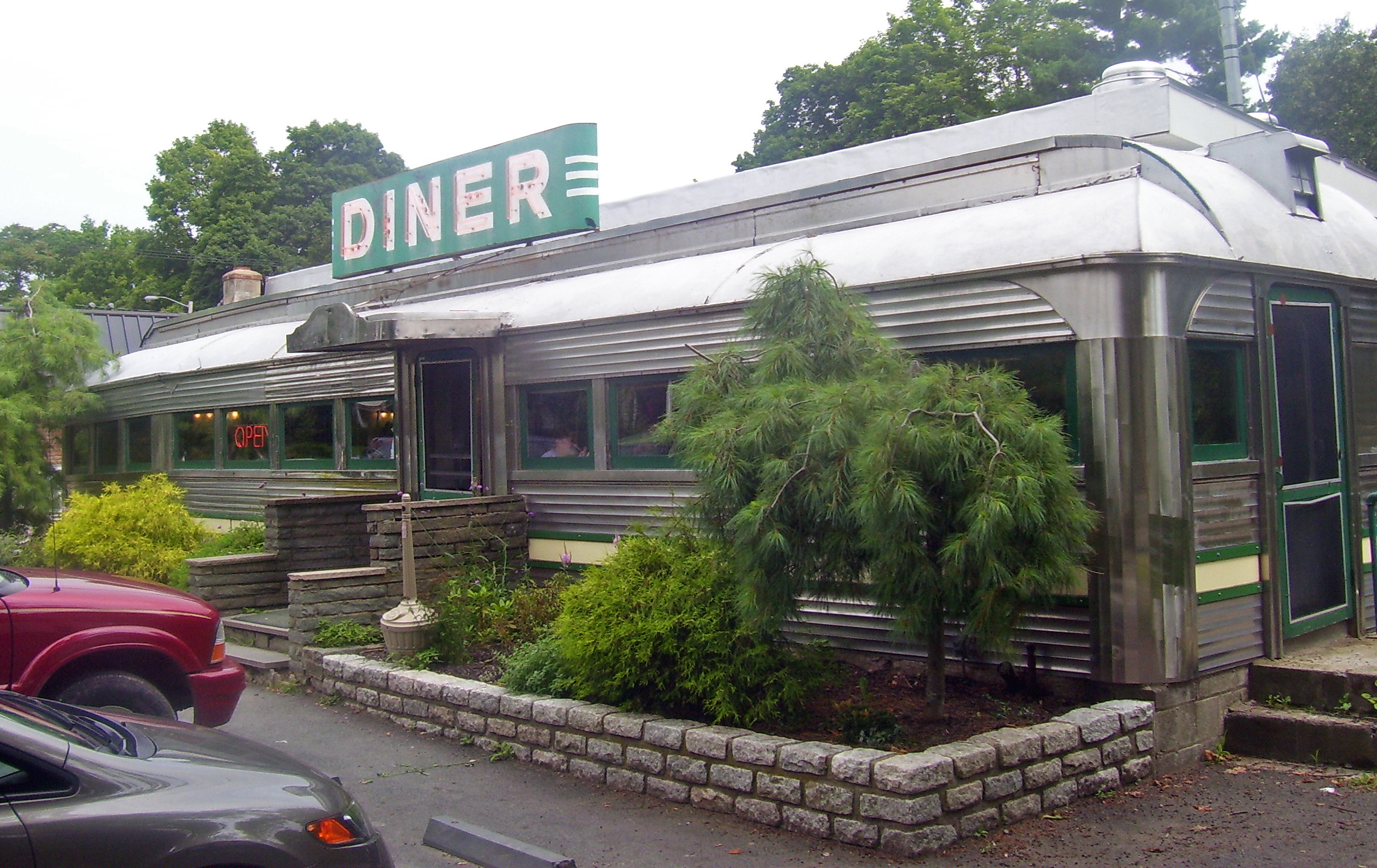
- East elevation and south profile, 2008

- Location within New York Location within the United States
- Location: Red Hook, New York
- Nearest city: Kingston
- Coordinates: 41°59′48″N 73°52′27″W
- Area: 9,375 square feet (871.0 m^{2})
- Built: 1925
- Architect: Silk City Diners division of Paterson Vehicle Company
- NRHP reference No.: 87002297
- Added to NRHP: January 7, 1988

The Village Diner, sometimes called the Halfway Diner or the Historic Village Diner, is located on North Broadway (U.S. Route 9) a block north of New York State Route 199, in Red Hook, New York, United States. It is a 1951 diner that has been in two other area locations during its history.

Its design reflects the era when diners were modeled closely after railroad dining cars, with chrome exteriors and curved walls. In 1988 it became the first diner in New York, and the fourth in the nation, to be listed on the National Register of Historic Places. Frommer's called it "one of the best ... midcentury American diners".

== Building ==
The diner is in the center of a 75 by 125 feet (23 by 38 m) lot in downtown Red Hook. To the south is a Queen Anne Style house, to the north a small store and, across Cherry Street, the Elmendorph Inn. Across North Broadway are many 19th century residences. The front and rear of the lot are used as parking.

The restaurant building itself is on a cement block foundation. Its exterior is stainless steel, curved at the corners fluted and painted with horizontal bands on a steel frame structural system. Windows are rectangular and retractable, high up the wall. A screen door on the south side is centrally located. All these features mimic those of a rail dining car.

Atop the roof is a red neon sign reading "DINER". The main entrance is off-center, towards the south, as a result of a later expansion. A rear wing, added later, is sided in vinyl.

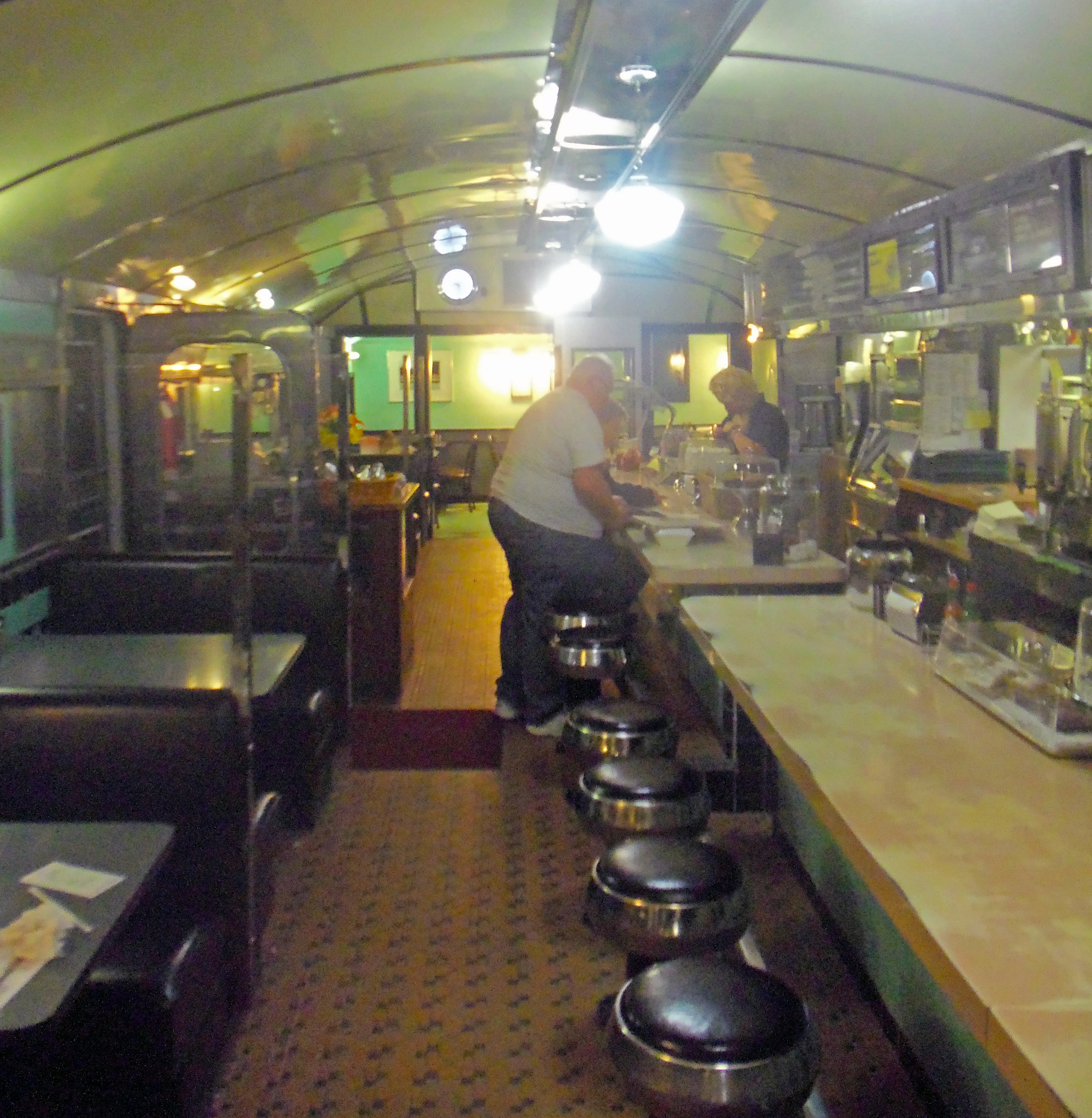
Diner interior

The interior further emulates its rail model, with tables in booths along the east and west walls with a single aisle between them. The ceiling is also vaulted. The rear is mostly given over to counter and cooking space; it has no windows as a result, a deviation from the model. A later rear addition expands the kitchen facilities to the east.

Much of the interior trim is original, such as tiled floor and wainscoting in turquoise and black, cream enameled walls, a laminated counter with 16 stools and a back wall with ribbed metal covering for all the kitchen functions. These treatments are more utilitarian, more typical of a lunch counter than a lushly-furnished rail diner of the era. The rear wing has some open dining space with freestanding tables and chairs, plus restrooms with their original doors.

The diner retains its original builder's plate upon which Paterson Vehicle stamped a serial number 5113 indicating that it was the thirteenth unit built in 1951. This was a typical practice employed by Paterson and is seen on many of its remaining Silk City structures still in existence.

== History ==
From their origins as horse-drawn hot lunch carts, diners had evolved during the early 20th century into stationary, yet movable, fixtures of the developed urban landscape of the urban Northeast. The increasing use of the automobile during the 1920s for intercity travel brought them into the countryside. Manufacturers offered prefabricated models with lessons in management, giving entrepreneurs the chance to get into the restaurant business with less capital than it usually took.

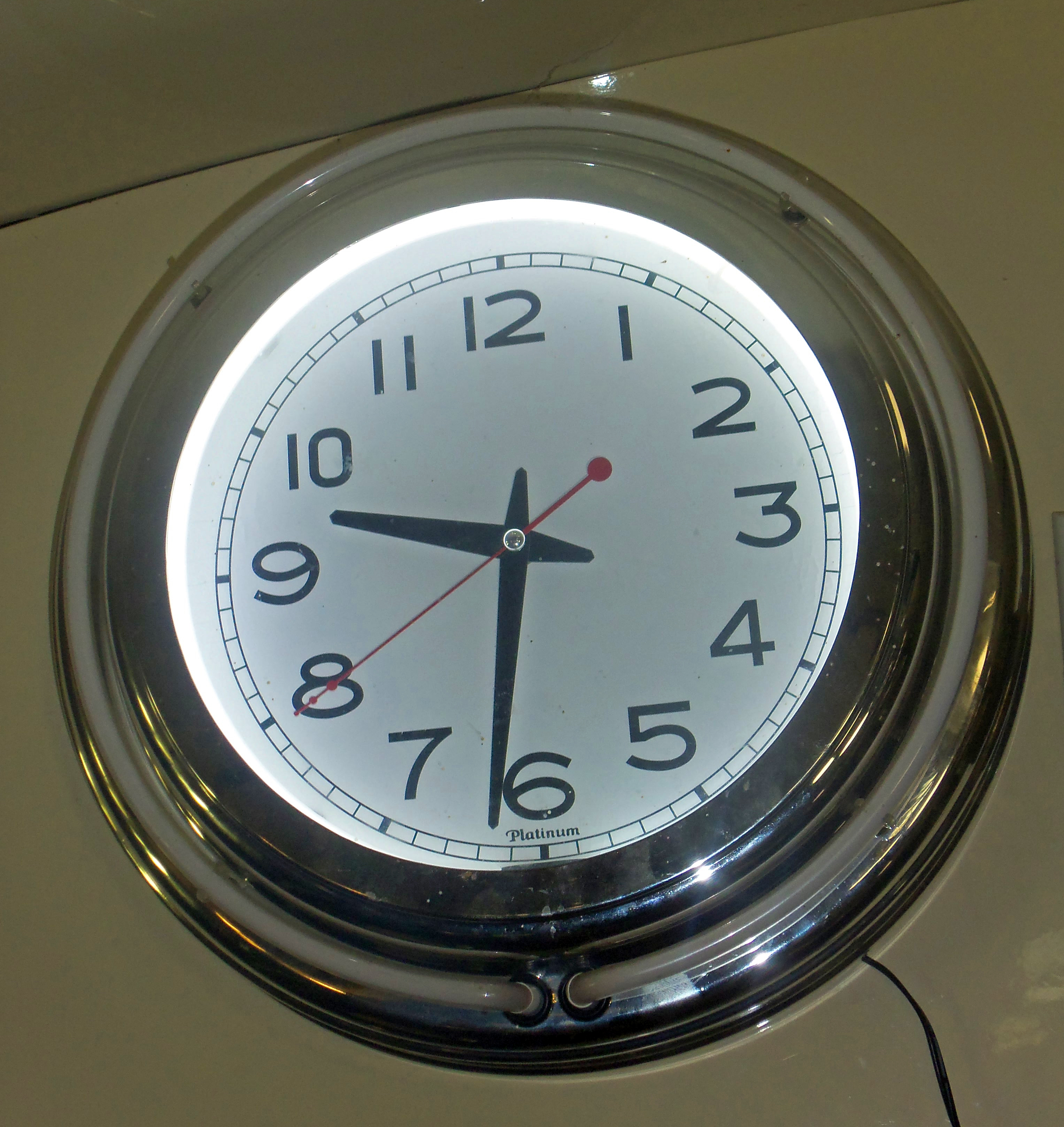
Original Art Deco wall clock

In 1925, Lou Dubois of Kingston, across the Hudson River from Red Hook, bought a popular Silk City Diner from the Paterson Vehicle Company, one of the leading diner manufacturers. He chose to install it first in an area along recently designated Route 9, the Albany Post Road, just north of nearby Rhinebeck called Astor Flats. They called it the Halfway Diner because he thought it was about halfway along Route 9 between New York City and Albany. Dubois's wife managed the diner while her husband continued to drive trucks for a beer distributor.

Three years later he died, and his family sold the diner to Bert Coons. He moved it to its current location and continued to make a profit. When the Taconic State Parkway was completed through northern Dutchess County after World War II, he moved the diner east, to where Route 199 intersected with the new road, to take advantage of changed transportation patterns. It is not clear whether he changed the name at the same time.

In 1957, with the Kingston–Rhinecliff Bridge having restored some of the lost through traffic to Red Hook, Coons moved the diner back to its present location. He rented it to others and then finally sold it in the 1960s, after adding onto it to make it more of a traditional restaurant. A new roadside sign announced its new name to travelers — the Village Restaurant. The current owners refer to it as the Historic Village Diner. It has become a local institution.

== See also ==
- List of diners
- National Register of Historic Places listings in Dutchess County, New York

Other historic diners in the same architectural style:

- Mickey's Diner in St. Paul, Minnesota
- Road Island Diner in Oakley, Utah (previously sited in Middletown, Rhode Island and transported to Utah in 2007)
- Miss Albany Diner in Albany, New York
