= Silk City =

Silk City may refer to:

== India ==
- Dharmavaram, Anantapur district, Andhra Pradesh
- Ramanagara, Karnataka
- Surat, Gujarat
- Chanderi, M.P.
- Bhagalpur, Bihar
- Bhoodan Pochampally, Telangana
- Berhampur or Brahmapur, Odisha
- Muddenahalli, Karnataka
- Kanchipuram, Tamil Nadu
- Arani, Tiruvannamalai District, Tamil Nadu
- Salem, Tamil Nadu
- Mubarakpur, Azamghar, Uttar Pradesh
- Varanasi, Uttar Pradesh

== Bangladesh ==
- Rajshahi

== Kuwait ==
- Madinat al-Hareer (Silk City in Arabic)

== United States ==
- Manchester, Connecticut
- Paterson, New Jersey

== Other uses ==
- Silk City (duo), British-American supergroup-duo
- Silk City Diners, a chain of American of diners from 1926–1966
