= Lawrence Park Dinor =

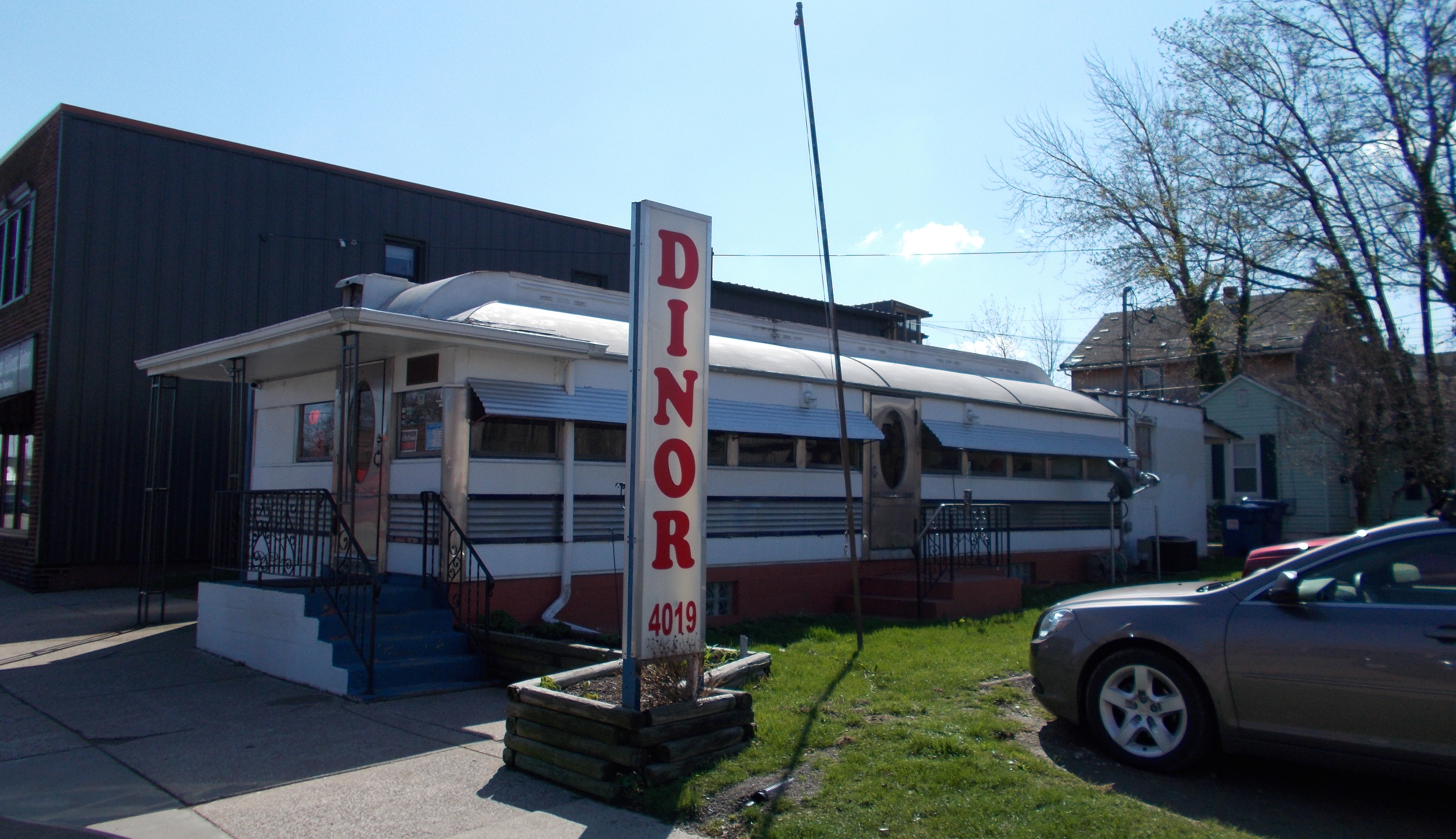

- Location within Pennsylvania Lawrence Park Dinor (the United States)

General information
- Type: Diner
- Location: 4019 Main Street, Lawrence Park Township, Pennsylvania, United States
- Coordinates: 42°9′1″N 80°0′52″W
- Opened: 1948

Design and construction
- Architect: Silk City Diners

U.S. National Register of Historic Places
- Official name: Park Dinor
- Designated: March 18, 2004
- Reference no.: 04000192

The Lawrence Park Dinor (also known informally as the Dinor at Lawrence Park or as simply Park Dinor in the National Register of Historic Places) is a Silk City diner in Lawrence Park Township, Erie County in U.S. state of Pennsylvania. It was opened in 1948, and has operated since then. The previous owner George Gourlias got the diner listed on the National Register of Historic Places in 2004. The spelling "dinor" is unique to northwestern Pennsylvania, and its origin is largely unknown.

== Design ==
The Lawrence Park Dinor is located in Lawrence Park Township, outside of Erie, Pennsylvania, on Main Street in a 40-by-125-foot (12 m × 38 m) lot. Because of the property's narrow size, the diner is oriented perpendicular to the street. A cottage erected at the same time as the diner sits at the rear of the lot, and served as the living quarters for the diner's original owners.

The Lawrence Park Dinor was manufactured by Silk City Diners, a division of the Patterson Vehicle Company, in Paterson, New Jersey. The restaurant building itself sits on a concrete block foundation, and is 40 feet (12 m) long and 14 feet (4 m) wide. Its exterior is a white, porcelain enamel with a fluted, stainless steel band "sandwiched by two narrow strips of blue". A monitor roof runs the length of the diner, a feature that was common in diner design until the 1950s.

The building's two entrances, one at the end of the diner and another at its middle, are both fronted by stainless steel doors, each with a large, oval window. The interior of the diner is laid out in a counter–aisle–booth seating configuration with 16 seats at the counter, 5 booths, and a free-standing table. The vaulted ceiling is made up of curved, porcelain panels.

== History ==
The Lawrence Park Dinor was manufactured at the Silk City factory and transported to its present location in 1948. Its first owners, Harold Curtis and his wife, purchased the diner to serve the community of Lawrence Park. As the majority of people in Lawrence Park were employed by General Electric 1/2 mile (0.8 km) from the diner, a fast and inexpensive eating establishment was in demand. The unusual spelling of "dinor" is found only in northwestern Pennsylvania and its origin is speculated to have been a typographical error that was never corrected, or a variant derived from the German language. In 1930, three out of five diners in Erie used the spelling; by 1958 it was used by over 90 percent of diners in Erie.

The diner was listed on the National Register of Historic Places on March 18, 2004, by George Gourlias with the help of Lawrence Park Historical Society Member Virginia Anderson. The current owner took over in March 2022. The Lawrence Park Dinor is known for its famous "Greek sauce"—a (brought to the menu by former owner George Gourlias 1991-2010) spiced, ground beef mixture popular in Erie as a topping on French fries (known elsewhere as "Texas hot sauce" for its use as a chili dog topping).

== See also ==
- List of diners
- National Register of Historic Places listings in Erie County, Pennsylvania
- Village Diner, prominent Silk City diner

== Sources ==
- Andersen, Virginia (July 15, 2002). National Register of Historic Places Registration: Pennsylvania SP Park Diner. National Archives and Records Administration. (Downloading may be slow.)
- Butko, Brian; Patrick, Kevin; Weaver, Kyle R. (2011). Diners of Pennsylvania (2nd ed.). Mechanicsburg, Pennsylvania: Stackpole Books. ISBN 978-0-8117-0676-6.
