= Elmendorph Inn =

- U.S. National Register of Historic Places
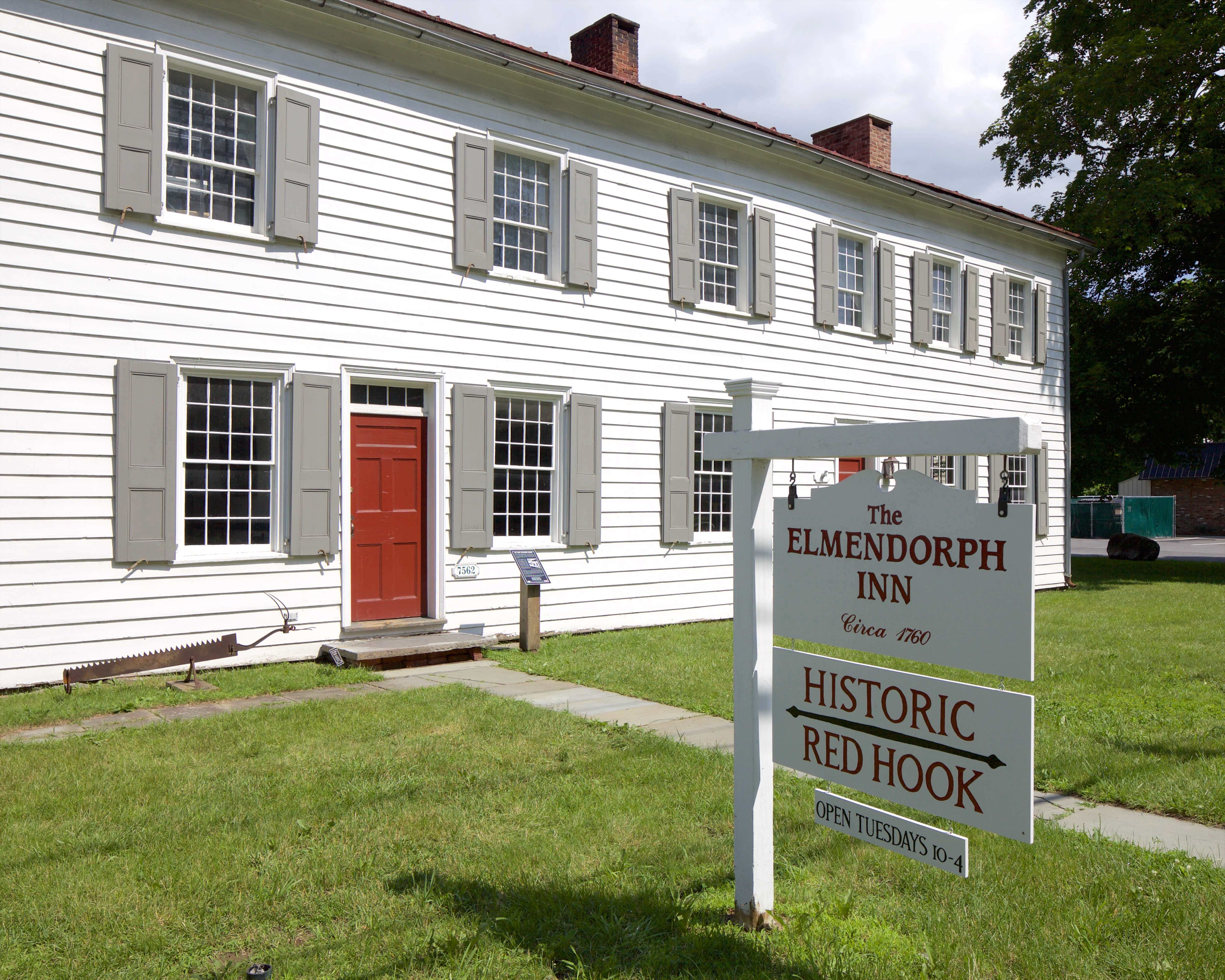
- West elevation, 2015

- Location within New York Location within the United States
- Location: Red Hook, New York
- Coordinates: 41°59′50″N 73°52′26″W
- Built: ca. 1750
- NRHP reference No.: 78001850
- Added to NRHP: September 20, 1978

The Elmendorph Inn, is the oldest building in the village of Red Hook, New York, United States. It is located at the north corner of North Broadway (US 9) and Cherry Street, a block north of the junction of Route 9 and NY 199.

It was built in the mid-18th century as an inn to serve long-distance travelers on the Albany Post Road. In the 1810s, it became the meeting place of the Red Hook Town Board for the next several decades. It has had a number of owners; the Elmendorphs are the earliest known ones. In the 1830s, it was expanded and renovated, eventually becoming just a residence. After a recent restoration it has become a community center. In 1978 it was listed on the National Register of Historic Places.

== Building ==
The inn is a two-story, nine-bay frame clapboard-sided structure with a modified gambrel roof pierced by four brick chimneys. A lean-to addition is on the rear. It is located on the north corner of the intersection, just two buildings north of the Village Diner.

Inside, the building has much of an interior added in the early 19th century, such as its wooden doors, lath and plaster walls, chair rails and exposed ceiling beams. The central hallway has a curved wall to accommodate the staircase. There is evidence of the expansions that have taken place, such as bricked-over former fireplaces.

== Interior ==
There are four visible fireplaces on the ground floor. There is a fireplace in each of the two reception rooms, in the dining room, and in the kitchen which has a beehive oven.

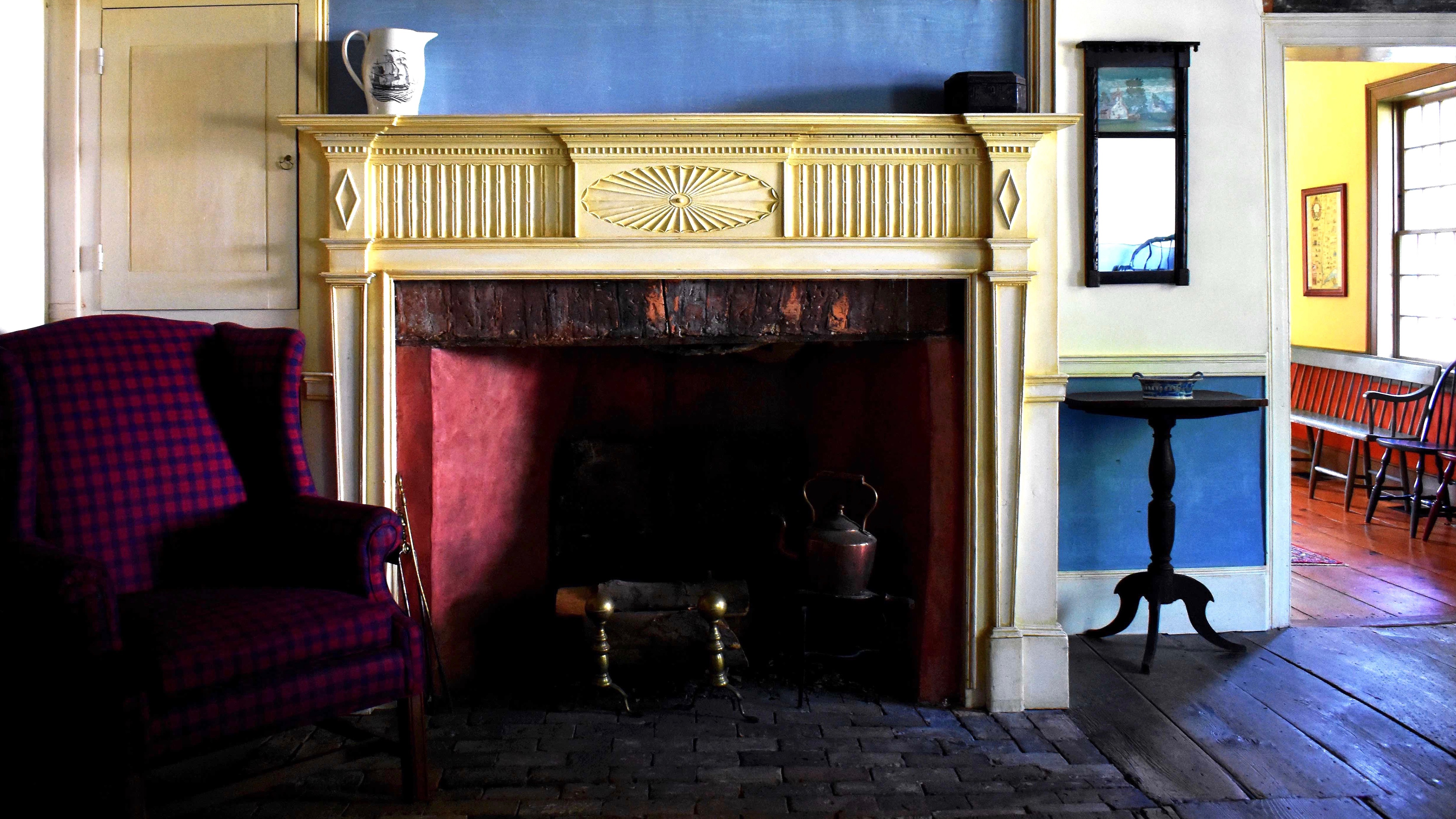
Small reception room, ground floor.

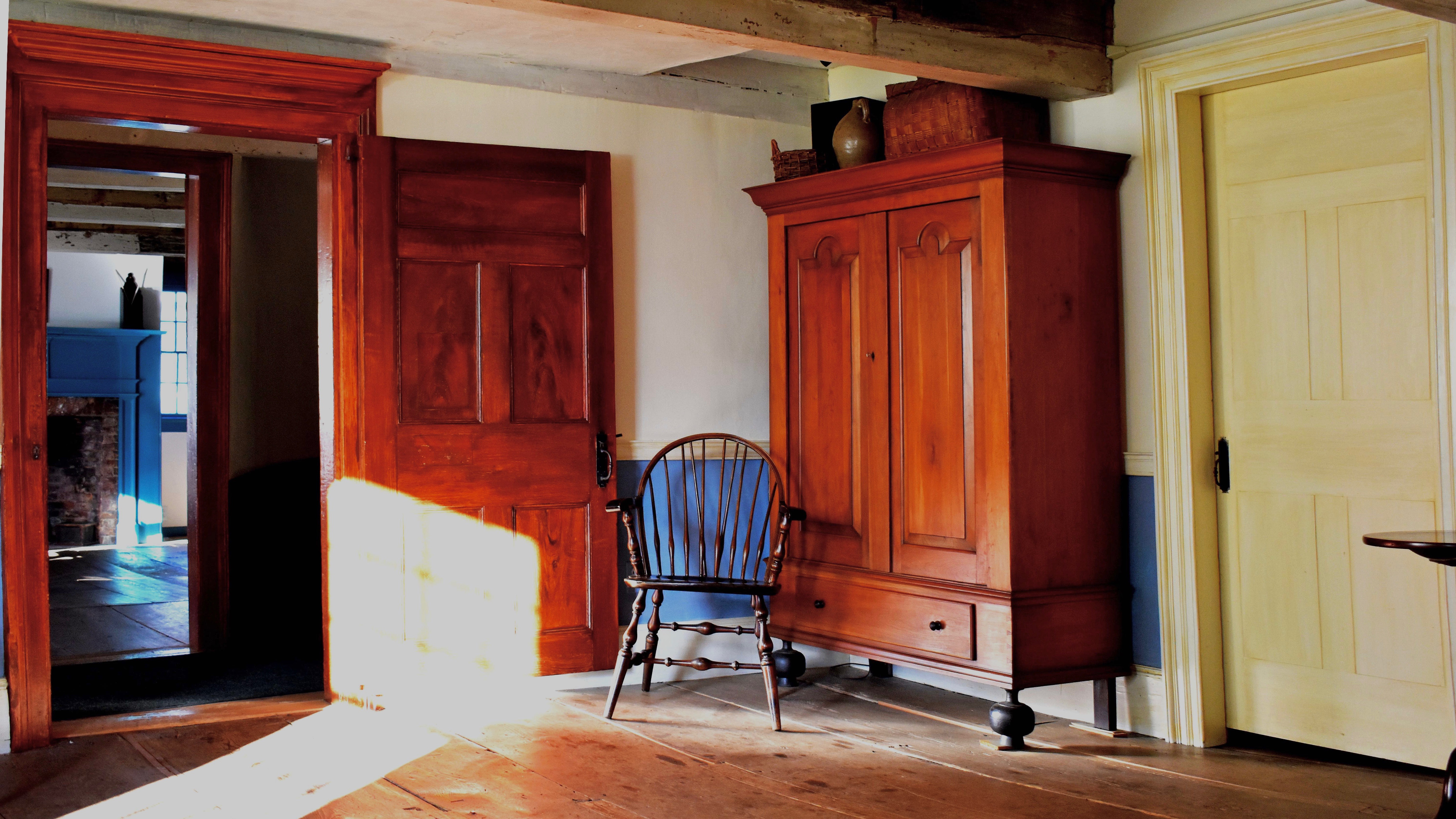
Small reception room, ground floor.

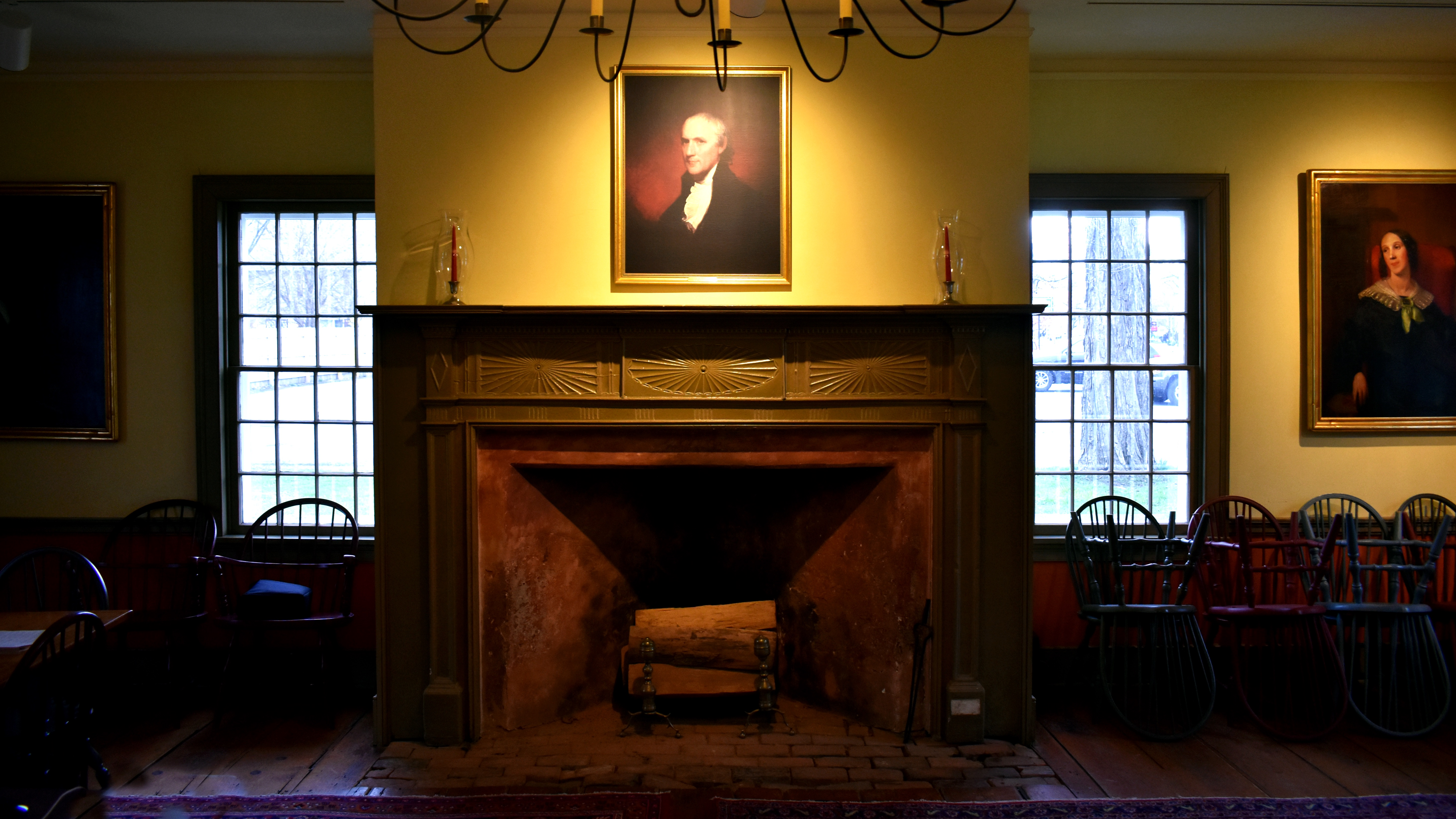
Large reception room, ground floor.

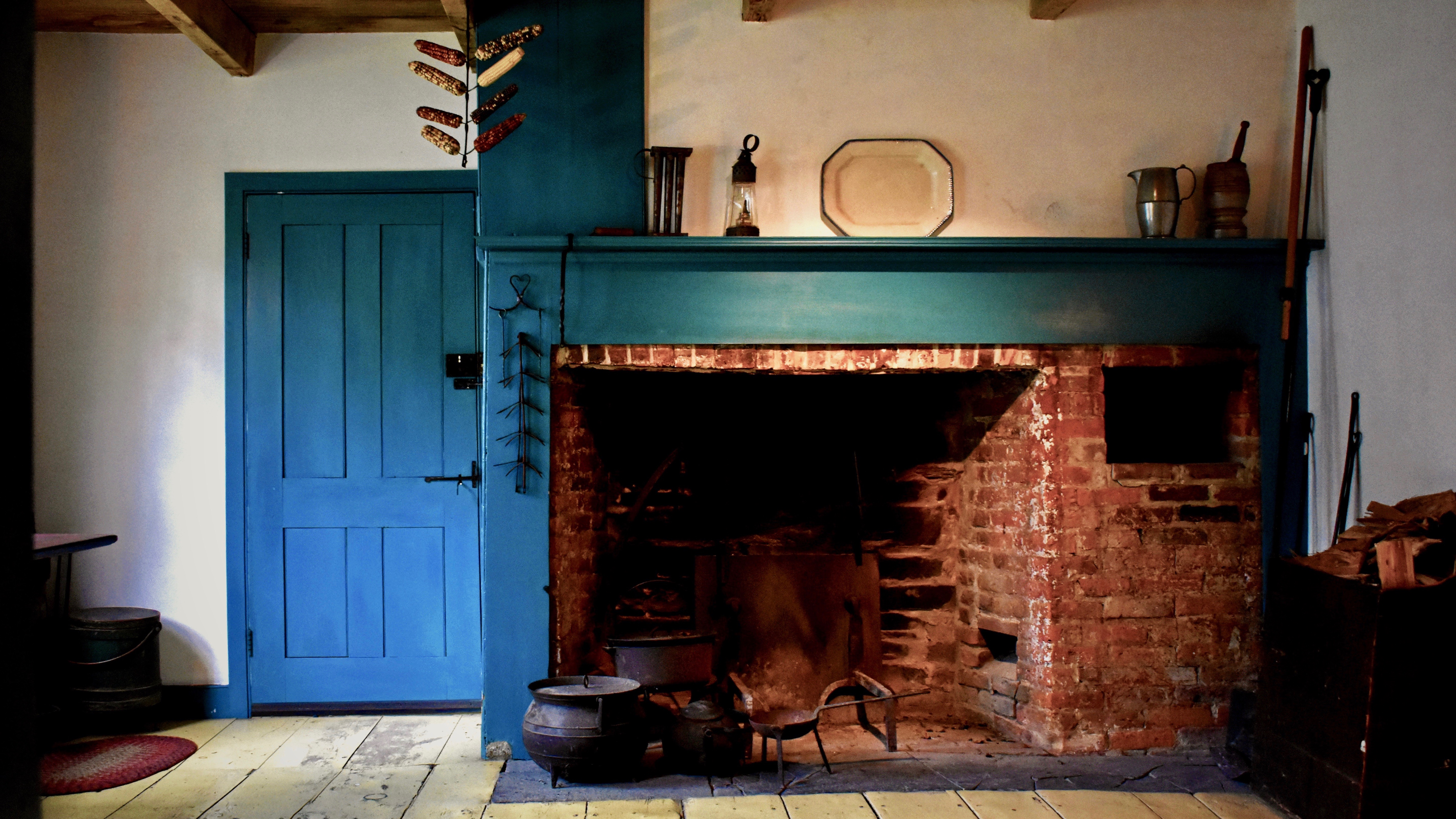
Kitchen fireplace with beehive oven.

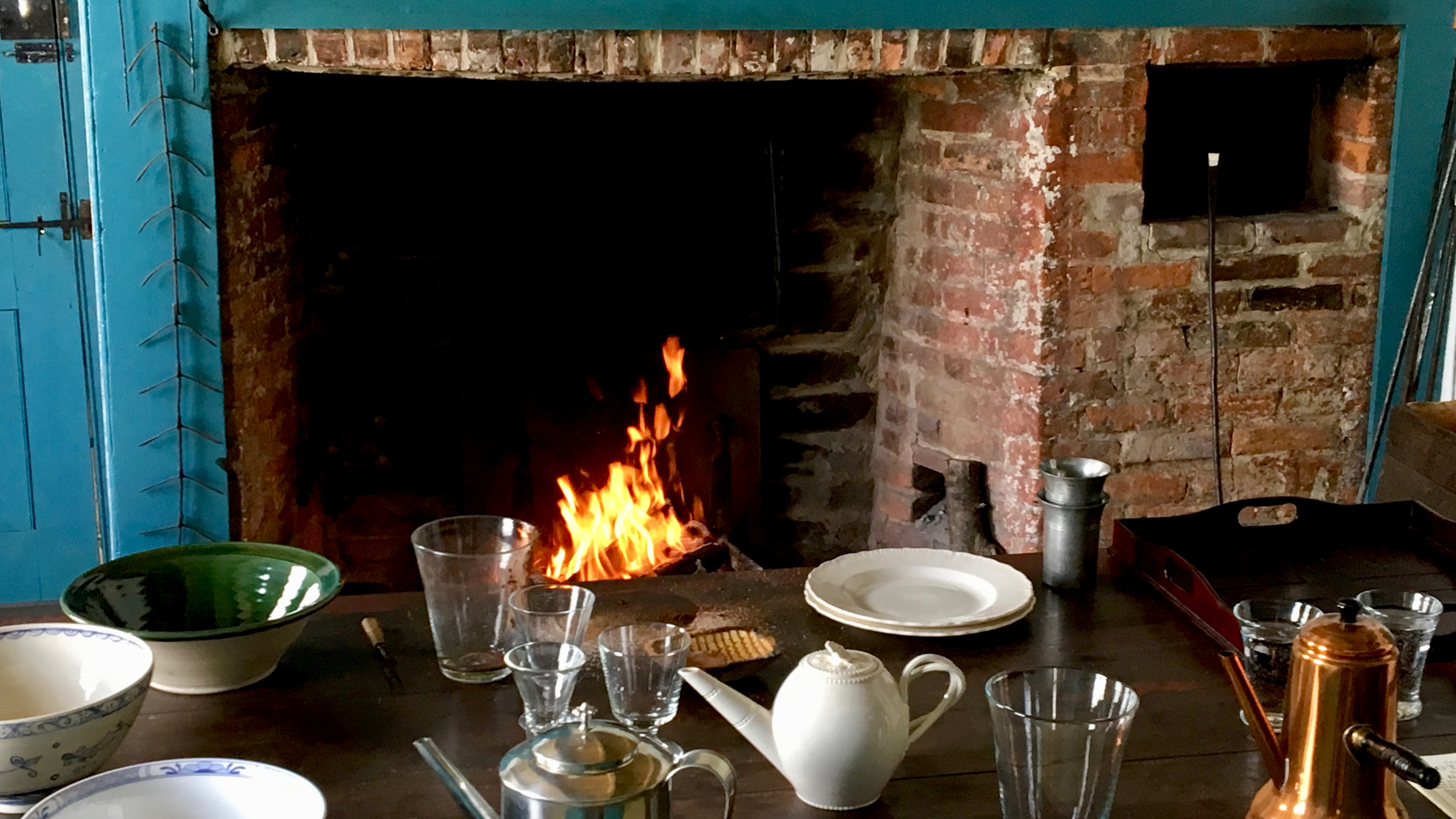
Kitchen fireplace and oven in use.

== History ==
Records of property ownership and improvements in 18th-century Red Hook are scant because most of the land in the village was leased from local landowner Henry Beekman. The village did not even incorporate until 1894, after a fire had destroyed many older buildings, further complicating historical research. The mid–18th-century construction date has been established instead by close examination of its architecture and the contemporaneous leasing of many surrounding properties.

For most of the 18th century Red Hook was just the inn and a few houses, serving travelers on the Albany Post Road (now Route 9), where it became a regular stop in 1785. It seems to have gone through several owners, and is first noted as Elmendorph's Inn on a 1797 map. By 1811 it was known as Loop's Hotel, after owner Jacob Loop, whose deed for 12.5 acres (5.1 ha) is the first indication of ownership of the property.

The Red Hook Town Board met there for the first time in 1815, the first of many recorded meetings at the inn. The first Dutchess County Fair was held on the grounds. When Loop died in 1819, a George Ring bought the inn. He opened a store as well in 1820, but this effort failed so thoroughly that the entire property was sold at a sheriff's sale five years later. The buyer flipped it the same day to Peter DeReimer, who himself sold it to a Jacobus Eckhart in 1827.

Sometimes during the 1830s, the inn was expanded in both the north and south directions to its present size. The original gambrel roof was covered over to create its present gabled appearance. The interior was also refurbished in the Federal style; many of those improvements remain.

The next owner, David Wager, lived there for a while before buying the inn in 1835. Town Board meetings continued until 1842. Three years later Wager gave some of the land on the east end of the parcel to the local Methodist Episcopal Society for use as a cemetery. He sold the property to Augustus Martin, a state assemblyman and town supervisor, shortly before his death in 1854.

It was the Martin family who ended the building's commercial use and converted it to a two-family residence. Edward Martin, a descendant, later operated a school in the building that, at least during the 1890s, had kindergarten classes. It remained in his family's hands until 1933. At that point the lot was subdivided and sold, with only the inn's half-acre (2,000 m^{2}) remaining. Heating and plumbing were added to the building during the 20th century.

In 1977 it had fallen into disrepair and was on the verge of being demolished. It was acquired by a group called Friends of Elmendorph, which renovated it to its present appearance over the next 12 years. A front porch that was on the building in 1978 when it was listed on the Register has since been removed, and shingled siding removed to reveal the original clapboard.

The building is now home to Historic Red Hook, a membership 501(c)(3) non-profit volunteer organization committed to collecting, preserving and promoting Red Hook's history. The group maintains the historic Elmendorph Inn as a community center, creating dynamic public programs and partnering with community organizations.
