= Jerry O'Mahony Diner Company =

American roadside diner manufacturer

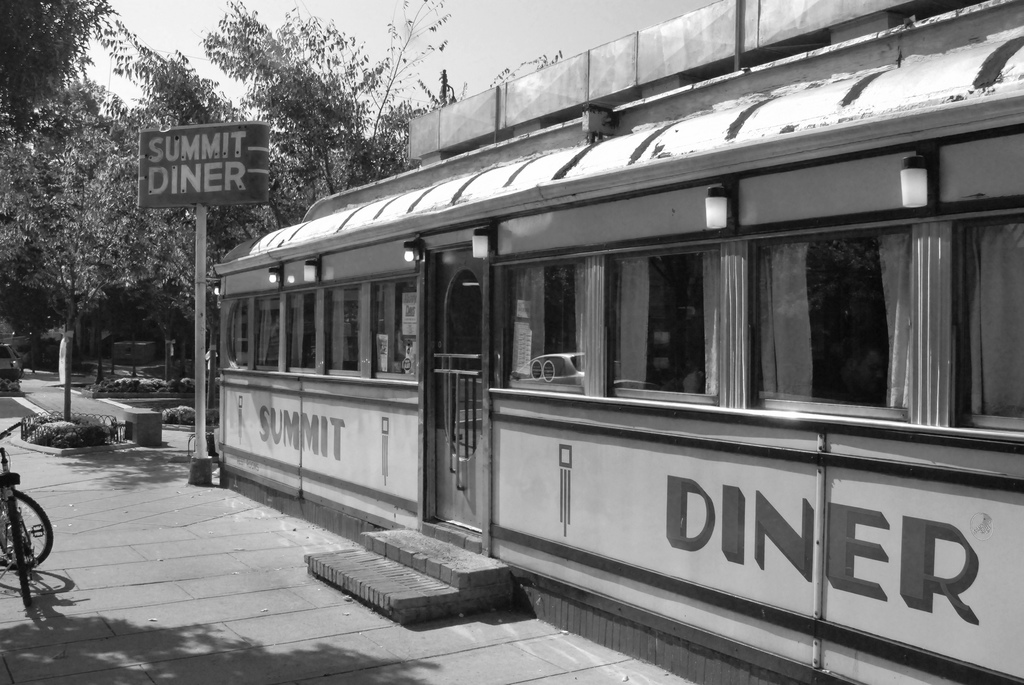
The Summit Diner in Summit, New Jersey, is a prototypical "rail car" style diner. Built by the O'Mahony Company in 1938.

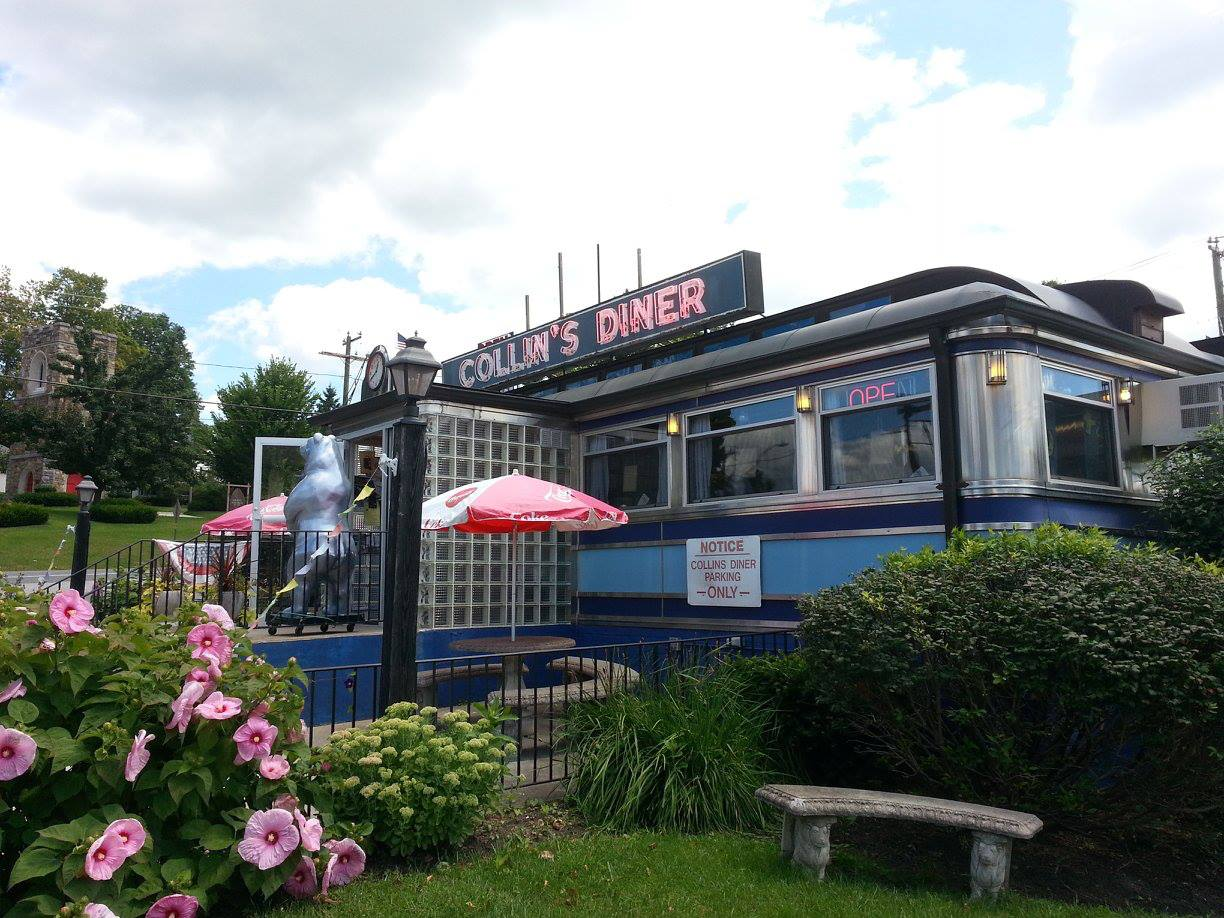
Collin's Diner, North Canaan, Connecticut, US

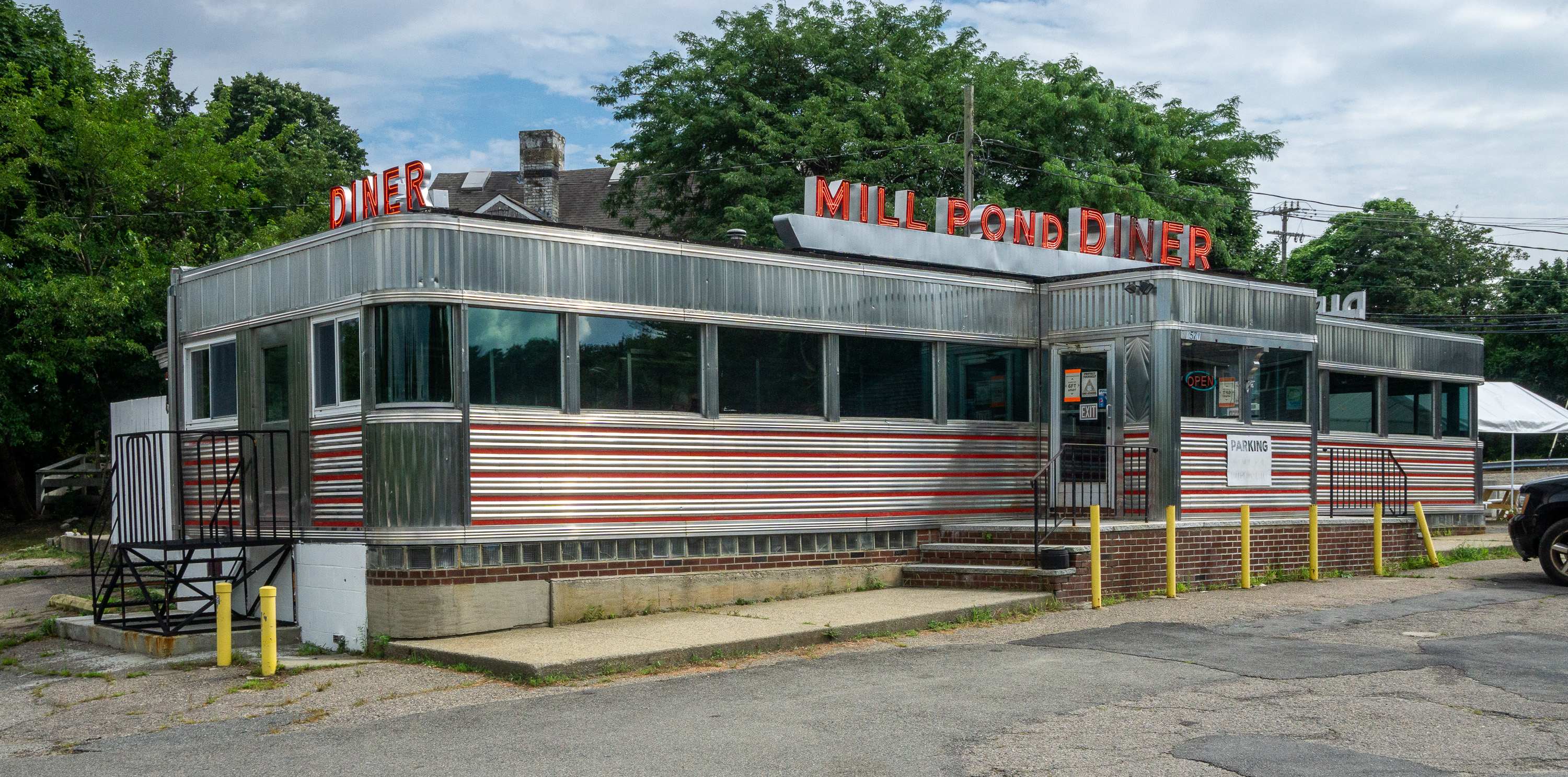
Mill Pond Diner, Wareham, Massachusetts

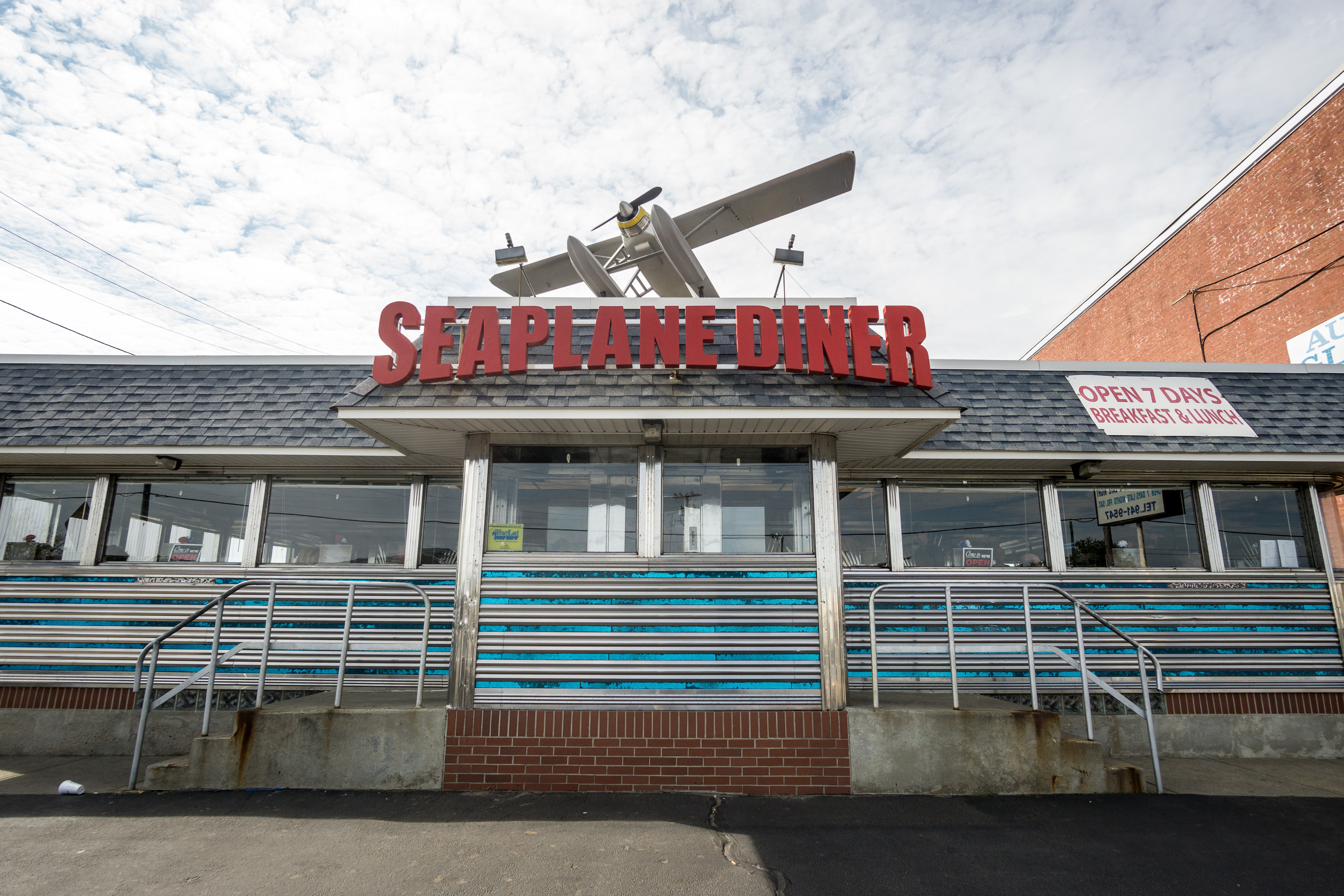
Seaplane Diner, Providence, Rhode Island

The Jerry O'Mahony Diner Company of Elizabeth, New Jersey, was a manufacturer of roadside diners from 1917 to 1952. The company produced some 2,000 of the long, narrow, primarily metal buildings, perhaps more than any other firm. Prefabricated in a factory and trucked to their locations, the diners resemble and are often confused with railroad rolling stock. The company's motto was "In our line, we lead the world".

== History ==
Jerry O'Mahony (1890–1969) of Bayonne, New Jersey, is credited by some to have made the first "diner". In 1912, the first lunch wagon built by Jerry and Daniel O'Mahoney and John Hanf was bought for $800 by restaurant entrepreneur Michael Griffin and operated at Transfer Station in Hudson County, New Jersey. The wagon helped spark New Jersey's golden age of diner manufacturing.

It is estimated that about 20 remain in the United States as of 2022.

== Examples ==
=== United States ===
- Miss Wakefield, originally Pat & Bob's in Albany, New York, is the northernmost O'Mahony Diner in the United States. It was built in 1949, rescued from a junkyard there, and trucked to a new home in Sanbornville, New Hampshire.
- Dolly's Diner, 1956 Model, relocated from the Gateway Diner Monroeville Pa (1956 to 1978). Now located in North Apollo, Pennsylvania.
- Summit Diner, a 1938 model, is in Summit, New Jersey.
- Hillsville Diner in Carroll County, Virginia is believed to be the oldest Southern diner (non–stainless-steel style).
- Triangle Diner, a 1948 stainless steel O'Mahony original model, is in the old town of Winchester, Virginia. The oldest stainless-steel-style O'Mahony diner in Virginia, it is being restored to its original appearance.
- Tommy's Deluxe Diner was moved in 2007 from Middletown, Rhode Island, to Oakley, Utah, where it opened as the Road Island Diner.
- Miss America, Jersey City, New Jersey, a 1942 classic stainless steel model, sits next to the New Jersey City University campus.
- Shawmut Diner of New Bedford, Massachusetts, was donated in 2014 to the Bristol County House of Corrections in Dartmouth, Massachusetts, where it serves as a training facility for inmates.
- TJ's (formerly the Point Diner) in Tamaqua, Pennsylvania, is a 1940 O’Mahony diner, although its exterior has been renovated and no longer has the stainless-metal look. The diner is in the Tamaqua Historic District.
- Palace diner 1923, in Gloversville, New York.
- Mill Pond Diner, in Wareham, Massachusetts, formerly operated as Earnshaw's Diner in Fall River, Massachusetts
- Kelly's Diner, Somerville, Massachusetts, built 1953. Formerly located in New Castle, Delaware
- Tilt'n Diner, Tilton, New Hampshire, built 1953. Formerly operated as the Monarch Diner in Waltham, Massachusetts.
- Seaplane Diner, moved to Providence, Rhode Island in 1973 from its former location in Woonsocket. Dates from either the 1940s or 1950s.
- Zip's Diner, Dayville, Connecticut
- Mickey's Diner, in downtown Saint Paul, Minnesota, United States. It has been in continuous operation at the same location since 1939.
- Joni's Diner, Lake Geneva, Wisconsin Originally the DeCoven Diner for 51 years in Duncannon, Pennsylvania, the L-shaped diner was moved to Walworth County in 2016.

==== Closed ====
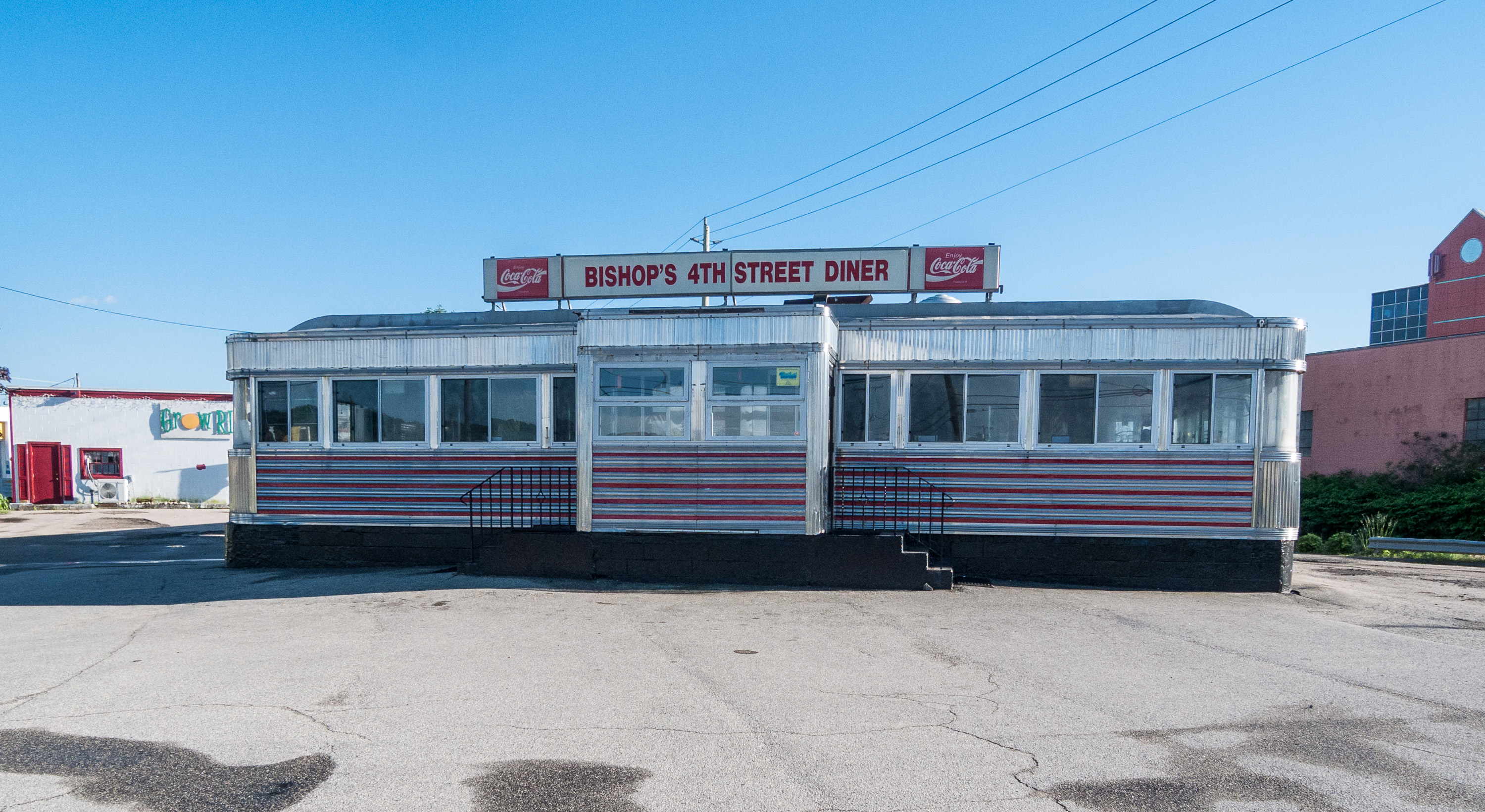
Bishop's 4th Street Diner, Newport Rhode Island, closed in 2022.

- Bishop's 4th Street Diner, in Newport, Rhode Island, was in continuous use in Newport from 1967 to 2022. Previously located on Route 6 in Swansea, Massachusetts, as "The Princeton Diner." It was moved to Admiral Kalbfus Road in Newport in 1967 as "The Galley Diner", then "The 4th Street Diner" (a tongue-in-cheek name, since no 4th Street exists in Newport). In 1998, renamed "Bishop's 4th Street Diner" after a new owner. The diner closed in 2022 to make way for a Seasons Market and gas station. After its closure, the diner was sold in October 2022 and moved to New Hampshire, where new owners plan to eventually reopen it as a restaurant.

=== Outside the United States ===
Overseas examples include:

- The former Murphy's Diner from Cambridge, Massachusetts, now the '50s American Diner in Swadlincote, South Derbyshire, in the United Kingdom.
- A 1947 model operated as The Excellent Diner in Westfield, New Jersey, until it closed in 1995; shipped to Germany, it now operates at Disneyland Paris as Café des Cascadeurs (Café of the Stuntmen).

== Pre-war Streamline Moderne–style diners ==
At least 26 pre-war Streamline Moderne–style O'Mahony diners (built between 1932 and 1941) still existed as of 2015. These include:

- The smaller 50' × 10' Mickey's Diner serial number 1067 in Saint Paul, Minnesota, which is one of several listed on the National Register of Historic Places;
- The 40' × 16' Collin's Diner serial number 1103 in North Canaan, Connecticut;
- The 1938 Summit Diner in Summit, New Jersey.
- The Road Island Diner (O'Mahony Dining Car #1107) was added to the National Register of Historic Places by the National Park Service on August 21, 2009.

== See also ==
- Franks Diner
- Frazer Diner
- Tastee Diner
- List of diners
