= Tastee Diner =

Chain of restaurants in suburban Washington, D.C.

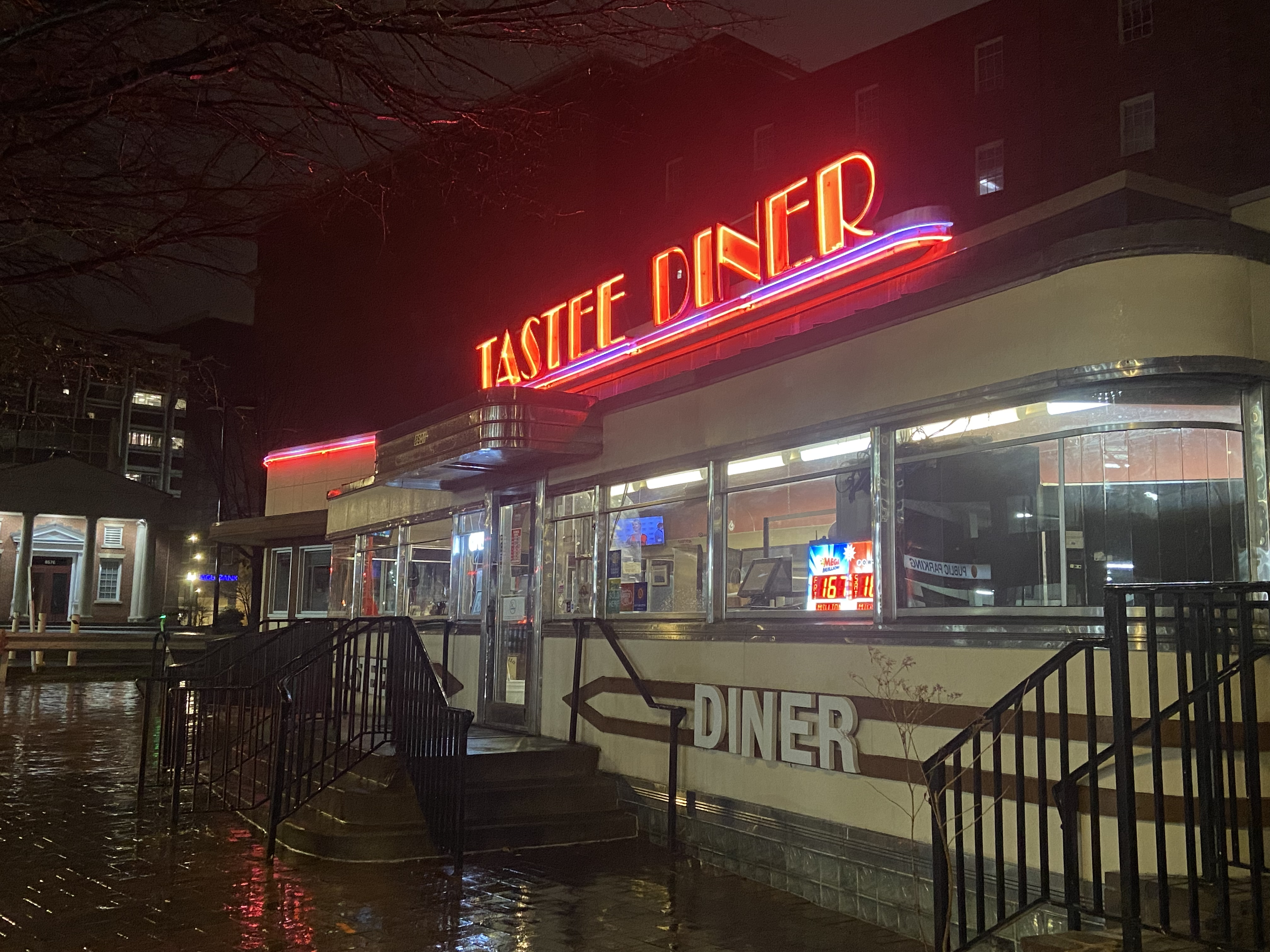
- Tastee Diner's Silver Spring restaurant
- Interactive map of Tastee Diner

Restaurant information
- Established: 1935
- Food type: American, diner
- Location: 7731 Woodmont Avenue (original location), Bethesda, Maryland, 20814, US
- Coordinates: 38°59′17.0″N 77°5′44.9″W
- Other locations: 118 Washington Blvd, Laurel, MD
- Website: www.tasteediner.com

Tastee Diner is a small franchise of diners in the suburban Washington, D.C. area established in 1935. There are two Tastee Diner locations in the US state of Maryland: Bethesda, and Laurel. Tastee Diner serves a wide variety of authentic American food, with a heavy emphasis on breakfast, and pie. Their restaurants are all open twenty-four hours a day, seven days a week.

The shuttered Silver Spring location was made an historic landmark in Montgomery County in 1994. It received national attention on June 17, 2000, when it was moved from its original location on Georgia Ave. to its new location on Cameron St. This was done in order to free up the land for use by Discovery Communications, which had purchased the property to serve as the site of their headquarters building.

Tastee Diner has been the subject of various news articles, including several from The Washington Post, which labeled it "The Most Famous Diner in Montgomery County."

== History ==
=== Bethesda location ===
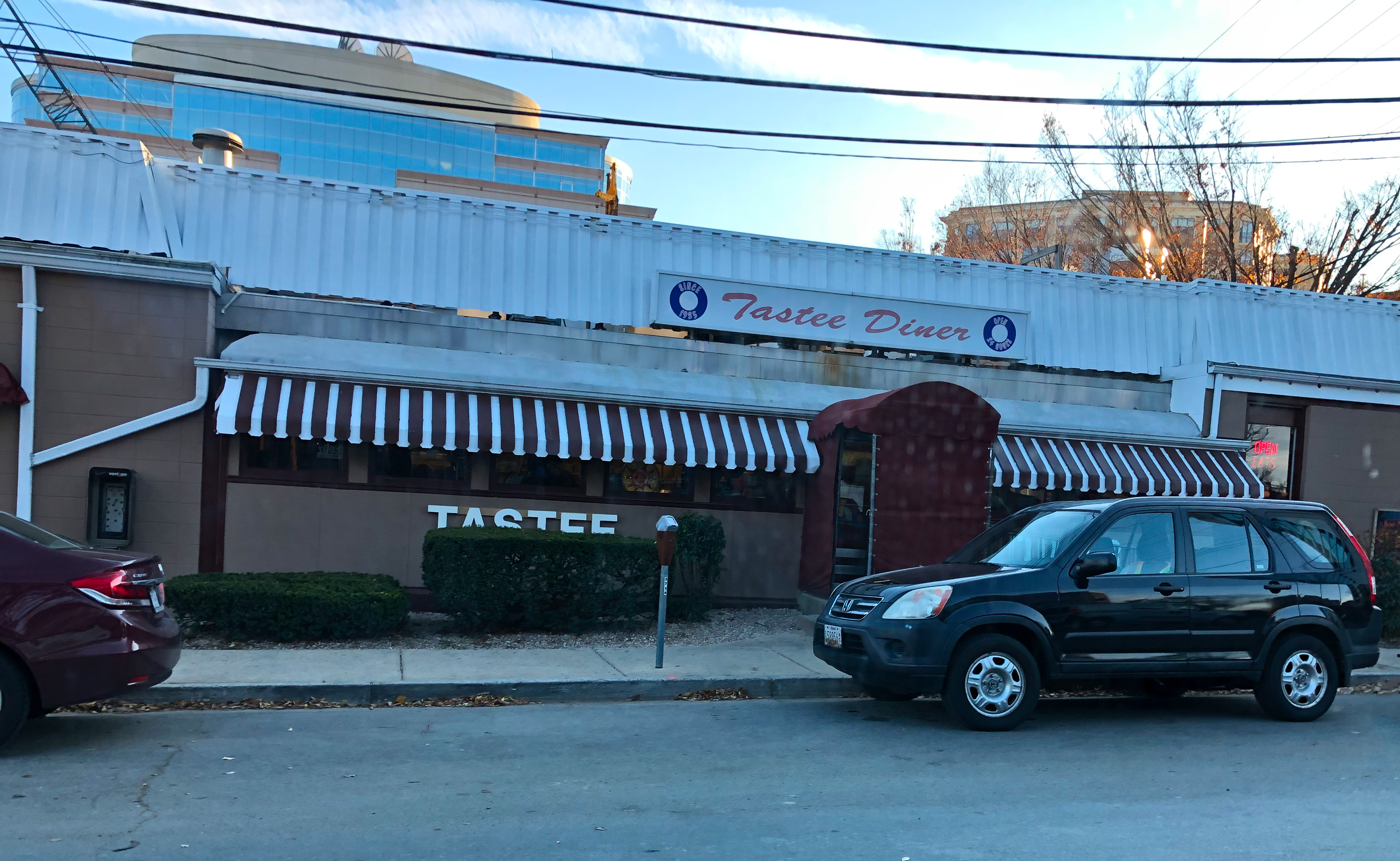
Bethesda Tastee Diner

The Bethesda location was the second to open, in 1939. The location was originally on Wisconsin Avenue, but in 1958, the diner car was picked up and moved to its current location on Woodmont Avenue. The original car only had six booths and the counter stools that can be found there today. The additions on both sides of the dining car were built in 1979. On June 21, 2002, it suffered extensive damage in a fire. The restaurant re-opened approximately two months later.

As of April 2017, owner Gene Wilkes had informal talks about selling the property to the developer of Marriott Hotels & Resorts's new $600 million headquarters, to be located on the same block.

=== Silver Spring location ===
The Silver Spring location was originally installed in 1935 at the corner of Wayne Ave. and Georgia Ave., and was built by the Jerry O'Mahony Diner Company. A new two-section O'Mahony Diner replaced the original barrel-roofed unit in 1946 and the original was moved to Rockville.

In June 2000, the front section of the diner was moved to a new location on Cameron St. in a scene immortalized in Bill Griffith's comic-strip, Zippy the Pinhead. The factory kitchen was demolished. The move was necessary to save the diner after Discovery Communications (owner of the Discovery Channel) purchased the land that Tastee Diner's owners had been leasing for over 50 years, but did not actually own.

Since the original building (not counting expansions built, over the years) was listed as an historic landmark in Montgomery County, local and state money was funneled into the construction of a new restaurant to which the original railcar module was attached.

The Silver Spring location closed on March 22, 2023.

=== Laurel location ===
The current Tastee Diner in Laurel was originally known as the Laurel Diner, constructed in 1951 by the Comac Diner Company, and was delivered by truck from Vineland, New Jersey. It is the third diner on the site, replacing an early 1930s model built by the Paterson Vehicle Company, moved to Baltimore where it was known as the State Diner. The building has a 3-bay structure, with its stainless steel rectangle attached to a yellow brick kitchen and service wing. Originally owned by three members of the S & T Realty Company, the diner was sold to M & W Tastee Foods in 1982. This property is said to be one of only four surviving Comac diners; the others are Jack's Diner in Albany, New York, Bayway Diner in Linden, New Jersey, and Daphne's Diner in Robbinsville, New Jersey. Of these, only Jack's and the Tastee Diner remain fully intact without significant structural modification.

In 2018, a marijuana dispensary company, Pure Hana Synergy, announced plans to put a cannabis dispensary on the site of the Laurel Tastee Diner, contingent on approval by the city. The Planning Commission, however, voted unanimously to recommend denial of Pure Hana's application; and at their Board of Appeals hearing, attorneys announced that they had withdrawn their application "out of respect for the community's wishes," after an outpouring of support to save the diner and designate it as a historic property. The diner owner said it had been on the market for five years. Diner supporters have called upon the City of Laurel to purchase the building and possibly relocate it to a vacant city-owned lot on Main Street, where it can benefit from becoming part of the Historic District.
