= Silk City Diners =

Silk City Diners was a division of the Paterson Wagon Company, later known as Paterson Vehicle Company, established by Everett Abbott Cooper and based in Paterson, New Jersey, which produced about 1,500 diners from 1926 until 1966. Each was tagged with the year and order in which it was built; for example, 5607 would be the seventh diner manufactured in 1956. Several have been listed on the National Register of Historic Places (NRHP).

== Known Silk City diners ==
Known Silk City diners
Image	Name	Location	Serial #	Year	Status	Notes
	1941 Silk City (George & Sally's Blue Moon Diner)	Gilmore Car Museum, Hickory Corners, MI		1941	Museum	Originally at 514 Center St, Meriden, CT; restored and moved to museum 2004; 42.44021°N 85.42008°W
	Airport Diner	Kutztown, Pennsylvania	6027	1960	Operating	Airport Diner has two surviving serial plates. 40.50634°N 75.78873°W
	Baby's Burgers & Shakes	State College, Pennsylvania	3071		Closed	Year uncertain; serial number decoding suggests 1930 but other sources indicate c. 1962. 40.79758°N 77.85630°W
	Besecker's Diner	Stroudsburg, Pennsylvania	5803	1958	Operating	The Diner Car has been encased in a building, and the car itself has new openings for the kitchen and extra dining. 41.00228°N 75.19931°W
	Biscuits and Barbecue	Mineola, NY		c. 1947	Closed	Closed June 2024; 40.74727°N 73.64747°W
	Chief Martindale Diner	Claverack, NY	5807	1958		NY23 x Taconic Parkway; 42.21665°N 73.70737°W
	Country Girl Diner	Chester, Vermont		1944 or 1948	Operating	Serial number disputed; diner's own sources cite both #48211/1948 and #178/1944; 43.26817°N 72.58965°W
	Deepwater Diner	Carneys Point, New Jersey	5809	1958	Operating	Exterior altered 2011; structure intact 39.71134°N 75.47263°W
	Deligan's Diner	Massachusetts	4824	1948	Private	Formerly the Blue Tone Diner. Formerly in Peekskill, NY; not operating as a diner 42.47417°N 73.15997°W
	Delta Diner	Delta, Wisconsin		1940	Operating	Originally from upstate New York; restored and reopened 2003; 46.45894°N 91.30188°W
	The Diner	Horseheads, New York		1941	Operating	Formerly Vic's Diner (Elmira, NY); moved to Horseheads 1974; 42.15641°N 76.82408°W
	Doyle's	Selbyville, Delaware	5092	1950	Operating	Originally Woody's Diner; brought from Paterson, NJ in 1950. Delaware historical marker SC-247. 38.45894°N 75.23415°W
	Exmore Diner	Exmore, Virginia	45103	1945		37.51905°N 75.82964°W
	Fezz's Community Diner	Coudersport, Pennsylvania	5413	1954		Originally Community Diner at Third & Broadway, South Bethlehem, PA. Reported closed June 2024; may have reopened under new ownership. 41.75456°N 77.95533°W
	Highspire Diner	Highspire, PA	5213	1952	Operating	More photos here 40.20834°N 76.78966°W
	Kims Classic Diner	Sabina, Ohio	4655	1946		NRHP listed 39.48914°N 83.63663°W
	Lawrence Park Dinor	Lawrence Park, Pennsylvania		1948	Operating	NRHP listed; original location 42.15063°N 80.01436°W
	Larry's 50's Diner	Woodbine, New Jersey	4502	1945	Operating	Exterior covered; Silk City car underneath 39.24178°N 74.81517°W
	Lincoln Diner	Gettysburg, Pennsylvania	5481	1954	Operating	Builder's plate shown 39.83199°N 77.23139°W
	Mary Lou's Diner	Fair Haven, NY	51112	1951	Restoration	Formerly known as the Daybreak in Marcy, NY; 43.305018990659235°N 76.717639559183°W
	Meadowbrook Diner	Brodheadsville, PA	5901	1959	Open	Currently only in use as the kitchen. Facebook Page; 40.92498°N 75.37859°W
	Miss Albany Diner	Albany, New York	4195	1941	Operating	Now Tanpopo Ramen and Sake Bar; NRHP listed. Serial painted on undercarriage beam. 42.66278°N 73.74472°W
	Monkey Thai Diner	Clark, New Jersey	5562	1955	Operating	Silk City car; operating as Thai restaurant 40.62821°N 74.30597°W
	Norm's Diner	Groton, Connecticut		1953	Operating	Formerly Paula's, and Tugboat Annie's; 41.35354°N 72.05981°W
	Roadside Diner	Wall, New Jersey	4932	1949	Operating	Reopened July 2025 by Nick and Maria Kallas. Featured on Bon Jovi's Cross Road album cover. 40.19711°N 74.11960°W
	Route 30 Diner	Ronks, Pennsylvania	5904	1959	Operating	Formerly Gehman's, Duke's, and Jennie's Diner; builder's plate shown 40.02621°N 76.16857°W
	Scratch Kitchen & Anthracite Room	Plains, Pennsylvania	5607	1956	Operating	Heavily modified interior; exterior largely intact. Approximately half the original counter removed for additional booths; no original stools or back counter fixtures remain. Expanded dining room added. 41.2907670°N 75.8434550°W
	Salem Oak Diner	Salem, New Jersey	5512	1955	Operating	Listed for sale 2026. HABS documented (NJ-1157). 39.57463°N 75.47732°W
	Silk City Diner, Lounge, and Garden	Philadelphia, Pennsylvania	5907	1959	Operating	Serial per builder's tag; business claims 1952; 39.96136°N 75.14610°W
	Tom's Diner	Ledgewood, New Jersey		1937	Demolished	Originally the Silver Dollar Diner; renamed by Tom Seretis in 1958. Cited as the second-oldest known Silk City diner; no serial tag remaining. Setting for Cyndi Lauper's "Time After Time" video. Demolished April 2021. 40.88650°N 74.66025°W
	Uncle Milty's	Glenmont, New York	3671	1936	Demolished	Serial documented via tag photo. Demolished 2021. 42.62005°N 73.78309°W
	Victoria Diner	Branchville, New Jersey		1950	Operating	250 US-206; 41.14717°N 74.75938°W
	Village Diner	Red Hook, New York	5113	1951	Operating	Also known as Halfway Diner or Historic Village Diner; NRHP listed. Retains original builder's plate. 41.99667°N 73.87417°W
	West Shore Diner	Lemoyne, Pennsylvania		1930s	Operating	One of the earliest surviving working Silk City diners; builder's plate shown 40.24102°N 76.90348°W

== See also ==
- Fodero Dining Car Company
- Jerry O'Mahony Diner Company
- Kullman Dining Car Company
- Mountain View Diners Company
- Worcester Lunch Car Company
