= Summit Diner =

Restaurant in Summit, New Jersey, U.S.

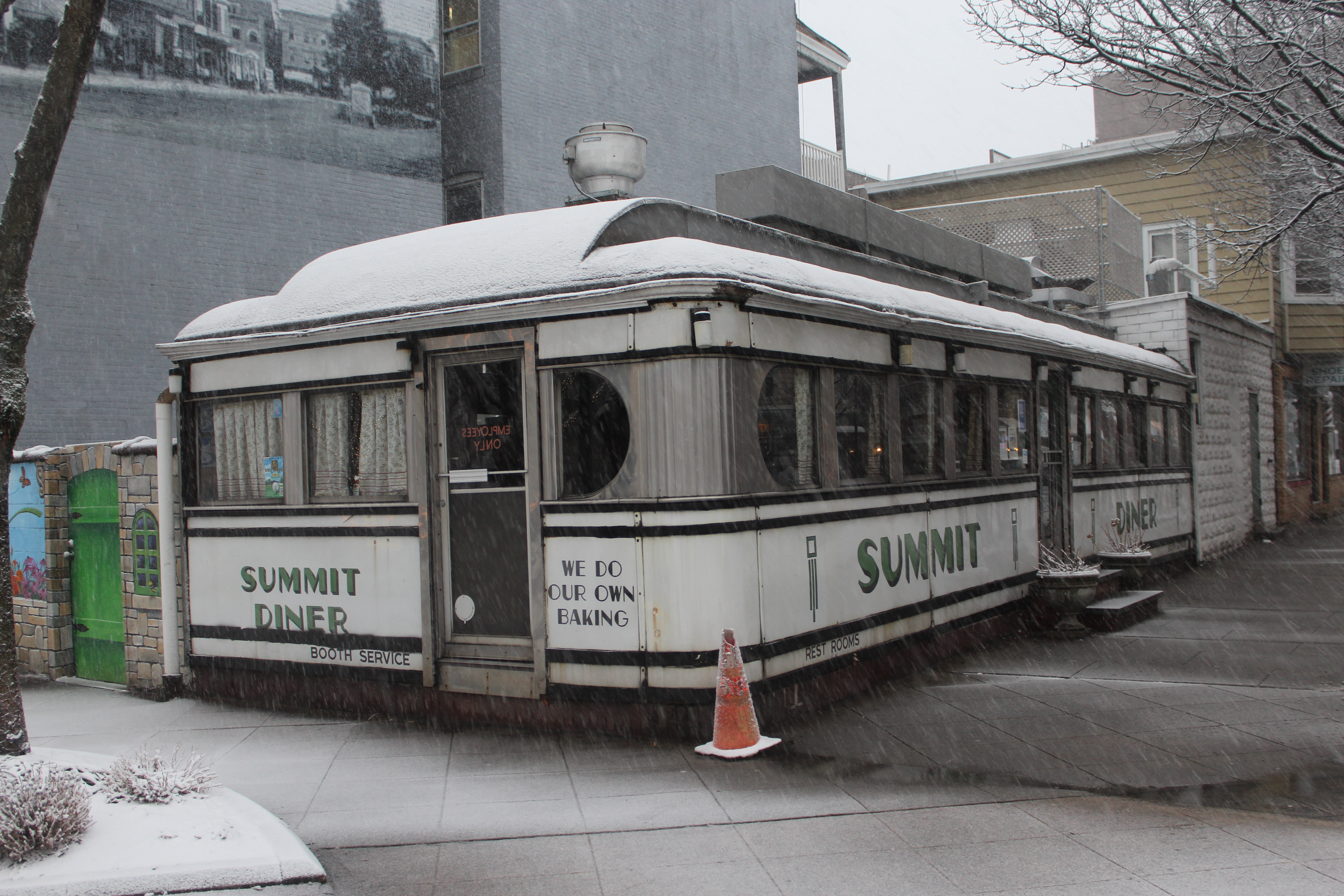
- Exterior of Summit Diner

- Location within New Jersey Location within the United States

Restaurant information
- Established: 1929
- Owner: Jim Greberis
- Food type: Comfort food
- Location: 1 Union Place, Summit, Union, New Jersey, 07901, United States
- Coordinates: 40.717018°N 74.356341°W
- Website: summitdinernj.com

Summit Diner is a diner located in Summit, New Jersey. The business opened in 1929. The original building was replaced with the current building constructed by the Jerry O'Mahony Diner Company in 1938. Food writer, Peter Genovese, considered Summit Diner a quintessential diner.

== History ==
There has been a Summit Diner at this location since 1929, and the current diner structure, built in 1938 is among the oldest diners in New Jersey. The current diner was constructed in Elizabeth by the Jerry O'Mahony Diner Company in 1938 and moved to its current location.

The Greberis family purchased the diner in 1964. Jim Greberis began working at Summit Diner in 1980. He purchased the diner from his father-in-law in 1985 and is the current owner. The head cooks are Vasilio Mazradis and Jimmy Michaelos. Michaelos makes the spinach pie. The restaurant does not offer a menu, only a board above the kitchen with a list of items.

Celebrities and politicians such as Jim Cramer and Jon Corzine have dined at Summit Diner. It has been rumored that Ernest Hemingway was a patron at the diner. Peter Genovese included the diner in the article "50 restaurants to choose from if it's your last meal in N.J." and recommended the pork roll, eggs and cheese sandwich.

Summit Diner was featured in the show The Food Dude in the first episode "Breakfast, Lunch and Dinner" as a breakfast location.

In 2017, Mike Lustig of NJ.com ranked Summit Diner's corned beef hash as the best in New Jersey.

== See also ==
- List of diners
