= Mickey's Diner =

Restaurant in Saint Paul, Minnesota, US

- U.S. National Register of Historic Places
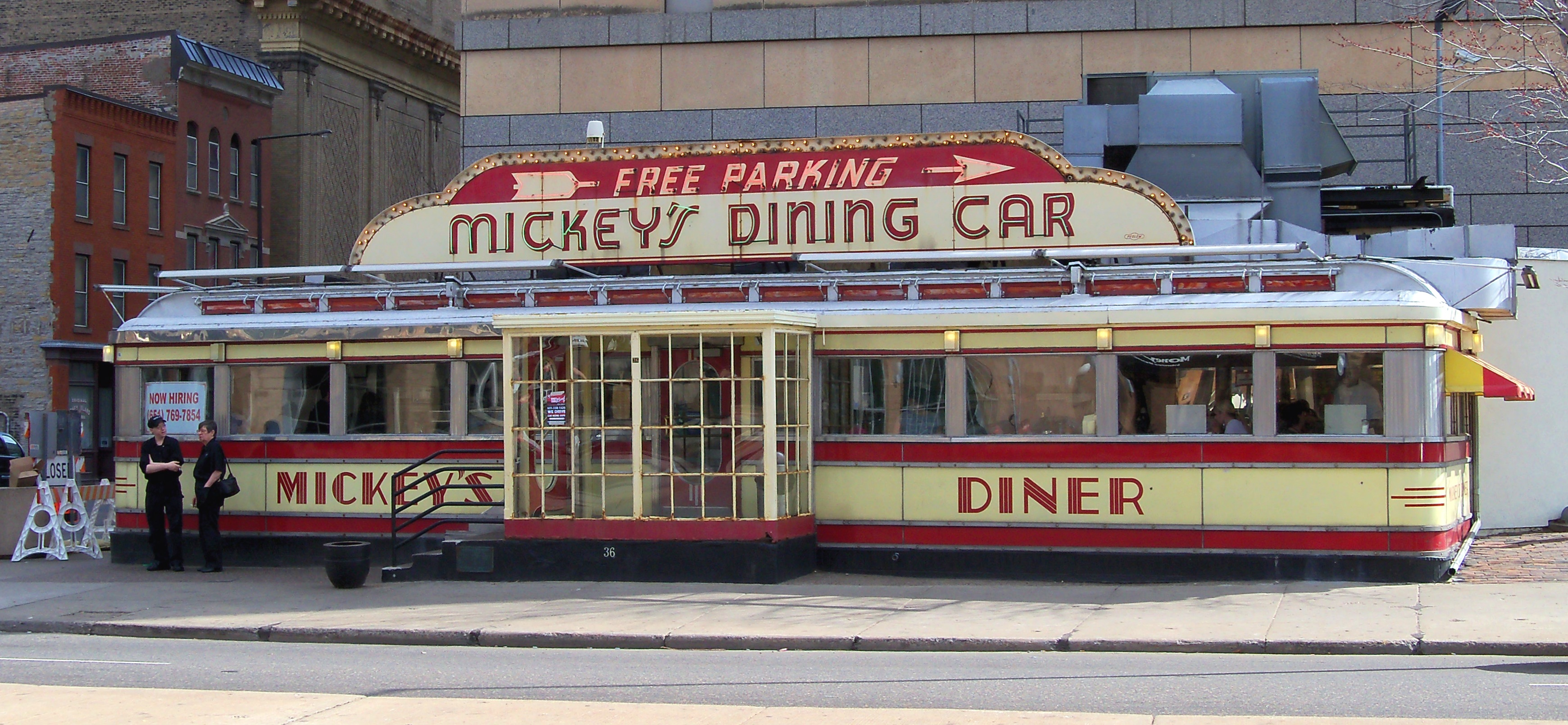
- Mickey's Diner from the northwest

- Location within Minnesota Location within the United States
- Location: 36 West 7th Street, Saint Paul, Minnesota
- Coordinates: 44°56′50.8″N 93°5′53.3″W
- Area: Less than one acre
- Built: 1937 (installed 1939)
- Architect: Jerry O'Mahony Diner Company
- Architectural style: Streamline Moderne
- NRHP reference No.: 83000936
- Designated: February 24, 1983

Mickey's Dining Car is a classic diner in downtown Saint Paul, Minnesota, United States. Designed to resemble a railroad dining car, the prefabricated building was constructed in 1937 by the Jerry O'Mahony Diner Company of Elizabeth, New Jersey, then shipped to Saint Paul by rail, opening in 1939. Its unusual architecture made it a local landmark. It was listed on the National Register of Historic Places in 1983 for having local significance in the themes of architecture and commerce. It was nominated for being "a beloved, longstanding and unique social institution," an unaltered example of railroad car-style diners, and one of the few surviving examples of its type in the American Midwest. The diner ran in continuous operation at the same location on West 7th Street from 1939 until the COVID-19 pandemic in 2020. The diner remained closed from this point until it reopened on the morning of October 3, 2024.

== Description ==
50 feet (15 m) long and 10 feet (3.0 m) wide, Mickey's has distinctive red and yellow porcelain-enameled steel panels and Art Deco-style lettering on the exterior. A row of 10 train-style windows graces the front. The interior features floor-mounted round stools along a well-worn counter.

Mickey Crimmons and Bert Mattson opened Mickey's Diner in 1939. Such diners had gained popularity early in the 20th century as inexpensive, often all-night, eateries. Mickey's Diner has been operating as a family-owned business since the year it opened.

Besides its architecture, Mickey's is known for its all-day (and all-night) breakfast menu. The menu features such staples as eggs, pancakes, and hash browns. It also includes Mickey's homemade mulligan stew, hamburgers, and ice cream floats, milkshakes, and malts.

== Media appearances ==
Mickey's is famous beyond Minnesota. It was named one of America's Top Ten Diners by Jane and Michael Stern in Gourmet magazine. It also has been featured on travel and food television series like Unwrapped, Roker on the Road, Rachael Ray's Tasty Travels, Feasting on Asphalt, and Man v. Food. The unusual diner has been showcased in magazines such as Smithsonian, National Geographic, and Sports Illustrated.

The diner also has appeared in movies that include The Mighty Ducks series of the 1990s and Jingle All the Way (1996). The opening and closing scenes of the 2006 Robert Altman film A Prairie Home Companion were shot at Mickey's.

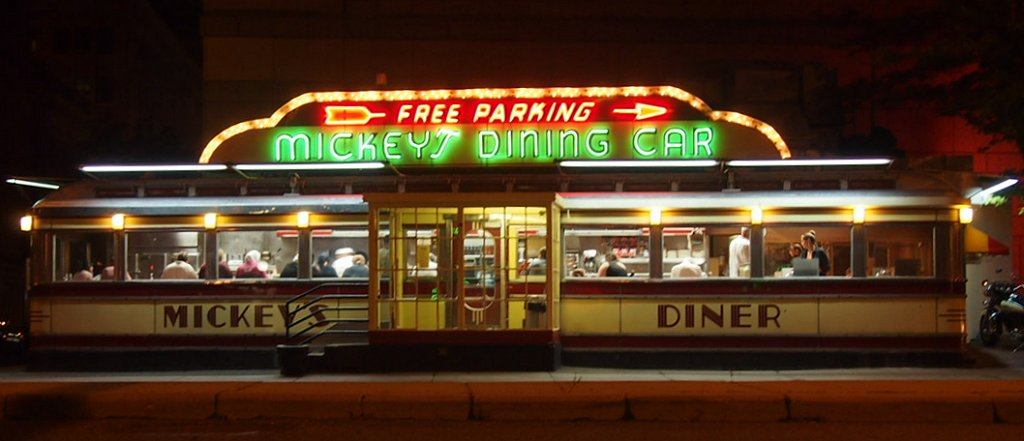
Mickey's Diner at night

The diner is also featured on the front and back cover of the 1985 self-titled debut album of R&B singer Alexander O'Neal, and appears in his 1985 music video for the song "Innocent". The diner also appears in the 1991 Pet Shop Boys music video for the song "Where the Streets Have No Name (I Can't Take My Eyes off You)".

During the 2008 Republican National Convention in Saint Paul, police confronted about 200 protesters in front of Mickey's Diner. They dispersed them with tear gas, pepper spray, and flash grenades.

== Mickey's by Willy ==
A distinct Mickey's restaurant location under different ownership is located at 1950 West 7th Street in Saint Paul's Sibley neighborhood, Mickey's by Willy. It is decorated in the manner of a 1950s-style diner rather than the original location which is representative of the Great Depression and World War II eras of the 1930s and 1940s. The secondary location opened in 1960. The menu differs at the second location though there are overlaps. At one time, there were twelve locations under the original ownership.

== See also ==
- List of diners
- National Register of Historic Places listings in Ramsey County, Minnesota
