= Oakley, Utah =

City in Utah, United States

- City
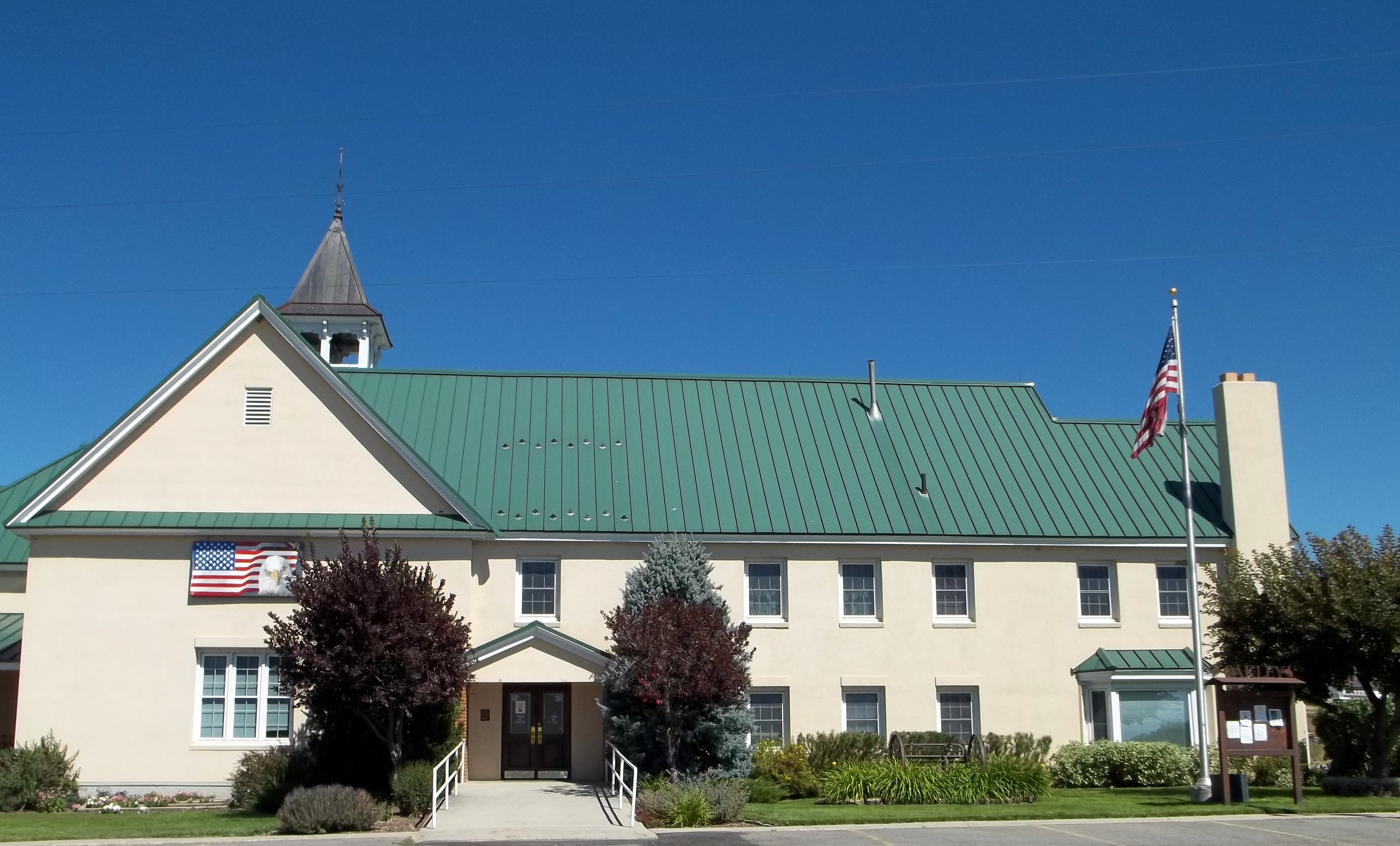
- Oakley Town Hall

- Location in Summit County and the state of Utah
- Coordinates: 40°43′40″N 111°16′17″W
- Country: United States
- State: Utah
- County: Summit
- Settled: 1868
- Incorporated: 1933
- Named for: Gambel oak

Area
  - Total: 7.09 sq mi (18.36 km^{2})
  - Land: 7.08 sq mi (18.35 km^{2})
  - Water: 0.0039 sq mi (0.01 km^{2})
- Elevation: 6,585 ft (2,007 m)

Population (2020)
  - Total: 1,588
  - Density: 245.7/sq mi (94.85/km^{2})
- Time zone: UTC-7 (Mountain (MST))
  - Summer (DST): UTC-6 (MDT)
- ZIP code: 84055
- Area code: 435
- FIPS code: 49-55650
- GNIS feature ID: 2411296
- Website: https://www.oakleyut.gov/

Oakley is a city in Summit County, Utah, United States. It is part of the Salt Lake City, Utah Metropolitan Statistical Area. The population was 1,588 at the 2020 census.

== Geography ==
Oakley is located 45 miles (72 km) east of Salt Lake City on SR-32, in the Kamas Valley. With an elevation of 6,500 feet (2,000 m), it is a gateway to the Uinta Mountains. Scenic route Weber Canyon Road follows the Weber River to its headwaters; it also follows the Smith and Morehouse Creek to its reservoir in its own scenic canyon 15 miles (24 km) from Oakley. The towns of Marion, Kamas, and Peoa are its neighbors, and the Weber River flows nearby.

According to the United States Census Bureau, the city has a total area of 6.3 square miles (16 km^{2}), all land.

=== Climate ===
This climatic region is typified by large seasonal temperature differences, with warm to hot (and often humid) summers and cold (sometimes severely cold) winters. According to the Köppen Climate Classification system, Oakley has a humid continental climate, abbreviated "Dfb" on climate maps.

== Demographics ==
Historical population
Census	Pop.	Note	%±
1900	335		—
1910	249		−25.7%
1920	365		46.6%
1930	371		1.6%
1940	305		−17.8%
1950	264		−13.4%
1960	247		−6.4%
1970	265		7.3%
1980	470		77.4%
1990	522		11.1%
2000	948		81.6%
2010	1,470		55.1%
2020	1,588		8.0%
U.S. Decennial Census

=== 2020 census ===
As of the 2020 census, Oakley had a population of 1,588. The median age was 36.8 years. 29.2% of residents were under the age of 18 and 13.0% of residents were 65 years of age or older. For every 100 females there were 95.3 males, and for every 100 females age 18 and over there were 94.0 males age 18 and over.

0.0% of residents lived in urban areas, while 100.0% lived in rural areas.

There were 500 households in Oakley, of which 40.2% had children under the age of 18 living in them. Of all households, 65.2% were married-couple households, 13.2% were households with a male householder and no spouse or partner present, and 16.4% were households with a female householder and no spouse or partner present. About 19.2% of all households were made up of individuals and 8.0% had someone living alone who was 65 years of age or older.

There were 593 housing units, of which 15.7% were vacant. The homeowner vacancy rate was 2.4% and the rental vacancy rate was 6.2%.

Racial composition as of the 2020 census
Race	Number	Percent
White	1,463	92.1%
Black or African American	1	0.1%
American Indian and Alaska Native	4	0.3%
Asian	8	0.5%
Native Hawaiian and Other Pacific Islander	2	0.1%
Some other race	44	2.8%
Two or more races	66	4.2%
Hispanic or Latino (of any race)	154	9.7%

=== 2000 census ===
In the 2000 census, Oakley had 948 people, 278 households, and 232 families residing within the city. The population density was 150.5 people per square mile (58.1/km^{2}). There were 330 housing units, with an average density of 52.4 housing units/sq mi (20.2/km^{2}). The racial makeup of the city was 96.41% White, 0.11% African American, 0.21% Native American, 0.21% Asian, 2.95% from other races, and 0.11% from two or more races. Hispanic or Latino of any race were 4.32% of the population.

Of the 278 households, 48.2% had children under the age of 18; 74.5% were married couples living together; 6.5% had a female as head of household with no husband present; and 16.5% were non-families. Of the city's households, 10.8% were individuals; and 4.3% were persons living alone who were 65 years of age or older. The average household size was 3.41, and the average family size was 3.74.

In the city, 36.8% of the population were under the age of 18; 8.3% from were from 18 to 24; 28.7% were from 25 to 44; 19.9% were from 45 to 64; and 6.2% were 65 or older. The median age was 32. For every 100 females, there were 107.9 males; for every 100 females 18 or over, there were 102.4 males.

The median household income in the 2000 census was $61,250; the median income for a family was $62,059. Males had a median income of $41,250, compared to $30,625 for females. The per capita income for the city was $21,855. About 1.6% of families and 2.3% of the population of the city were below the poverty line, including 2.6% of those under age 18 and none of those age 65 or over.

== History ==
The valley was inhabited by Ute Indians before the coming of Mormon pioneers. A historical monument erected in 1939 across the street from the current town hall by the Daughters of the Utah Pioneers, honors the habitation of the Utes. "INDIAN TRAIL This valley, settled by Thomas Rhoades in 1858, was a summer paradise for Indians who came to hunt, fish and gather wild fruit and sego bulbs. The Weber River Indian Trail skirted the east foothills to Oakley Canyon, crossed the river at the Old Kamas Ford, 3 1/2 miles east of here, running thence to Henry's Fork, and to Brush Creek, in the eastern Uinta Mountains. This trail was used by Indians, Scouts and Pioneers, and is marked in part by roads today."

A Mormon pioneer, Parley P. Pratt, was sent to this valley from Salt Lake City by Brigham Young in 1850 to check on the possibility of establishing settlements along the Weber River and the nearby Provo River. His report was, ". . . a good valley, abundant grass and plenty of water".

The first white man to winter there, in 1853, was Thomas Rhodes. An explorer, trapper, prospector, part-time farmer, and close friend of Brigham Young, he was occasionally called from his California prospecting by Brigham Young when there was a need for money for the church. Rhodes would disappear for a week or so into the Uinta Mountains and return with a supply of gold.

The first settlers in Oakley were William Stevens and wife, Emma Crowden Stevens; they moved there in 1868. Soon to follow were relatives and friends, among them the Fraziers, Johnsons, Hortins, Richards, Wildes and Gibbons, to name a few; all these names are still prominent in the town.

Oakley's original name was "Oak Creek", derived from the name of a creek that ran just east of the present town site and that was thickly overgrown with oak trees. The town changed its name to "Oakley" in late 1886 or early 1887; the new name was chosen from many names submitted by the settlers in a contest.

The current town hall was built as a LDS church in 1903, followed by a schoolhouse in 1904.

Incorporated in 1933 on land originally purchased from the Union Pacific Company by the early settlers in the land sale of the 1880s, Oakley has maintained its small town charm as primarily an agricultural community. At one time, it was a large producer of dairy products. More recently, it has focused on cattle- and horse-feeding, "haying", and still some dairy production. In addition, it is a base for recreational activities, which abound—hiking, fishing, horseback riding, camping, hunting, snowmobiling, and cross-country skiing—all within a very short distance from town.

Memories of early residents can give a real feeling for the town in its early days of the 20th century. Charles Reed Seymour, son of LDS Bishop John Heber Seymour, wrote the following:

Sometime around my sixth birthday, 1912, we moved to Oakley proper. Oakley was a very small community of some four or five hundred people. We had a lumber mill, a flour mill, an old-fashioned, all-purpose store grocery store, and a church. Our new home was a log frame house, two stories with a full basement.

The basement was of very little use, as it flooded every spring. This was to serve us but a short time, as my father had already contracted with John Salmon to build us a new eight-room concrete block house. Measured by the standards of that day, it was a rather commodious home-- five rather large rooms downstairs and three upstairs. The three rooms upstairs were framed but never finished while we lived there.

We, like everyone else, had outside plumbing and no running water. We always had a Sears Catalog and Montgomery Wards catalog (in the outhouse), which was a real good idea. We never had any money to buy anything from the catalog. For years, I thought the Sears and Montgomery Wards Catalogs were for that purpose only. Before I forget, I want to relate an event that took place while we were all living in our first home on Boulder Bench. My mother took us all to find the milk cow.

We were walking along a trail through the trees when suddenly just ahead there stood a grizzly bear, standing on its hind legs and in no friendly mood. You can imagine how my mother felt. I don't believe that any of us kids felt the danger like she did. I recall the incident but not the particulars. My mother, in relating the story, said that she told us not to move or make a sound. I am certain, knowing my mother, that her heart was reaching out to God for help. Soon the grizzly dropped down on all fours, turned and ambled away. There was no further attempt to find the cow that night.

It was not unusual to see bears in the early morning or late evening; in fact, mountain lions, bears, panthers and other wild animals were often to be seen, especially down in the meadows along the river.

My father was a farmer, but he was in demand for timber, road contract work, building irrigation systems, bridges. He was also the bishop of the Oakley Ward while I was growing up, until I was called to go on a mission. His two counselors were Tobias Rasmusen and Levi Person. I wasn’t baptized until I was ten. My father’s first counselor, Brother Rasmusen, baptized me in the Weber River and I was confirmed the next Sunday.

Lifelong resident Ken Woolstenhulme bought the small local grocery store then named The Merc in 1971 and ran it as Ken's Kash until selling it to Larry Devey in 2008. Then and now, the store is a gathering place for locals looking for the last ingredient for dinner. Those who grew up locally remember it fondly as one of the last places to offer penny candy. For a time, the store served as the local post office, but increased demand from summer homes up Weber Canyon led the federal government in 1985 to build the present post-office building across the street from the store.

Ken Woolstenhulme has been involved in all aspects of the town's life, including serving as postmaster, county commissioner, school board member and town mayor at various times in his life.

In 1998, Mayor Doug Evans and the town of Oakley discovered an underground aquifer containing water that had not seen the surface in at least 18,000 years, according to carbon testing. Found nearly 1900 feet below the surface in a layer of Mississippian limestone, the water proved among the purest ever tested, free of tritium and any other contamination from the nuclear age. Requiring little treatment, the water is free of pesticides and herbicides and the town now uses this water from the Humbug Well for its municipal water supply. Local businessmen have also bought the rights to bottle the water and sell it under different labels.

== Local attractions ==
Oakley is most famous for its annual rodeo, held each year on the Fourth of July weekend. This rodeo, sanctioned by the Professional Rodeo Cowboys Association, celebrated its 75th anniversary in 2005 with the opening of a $3 million, 6,000-seat arena. A large town park surrounds the rodeo grounds, hosting softball, baseball and soccer tournaments throughout the summer, with Ute League football in the fall and recreational soccer in the spring. Oakley has two eating establishments, the locally owned Polar King and the Road Island Diner, a former train car made into a restaurant that is on the U.S. National Register of Historic Places.

== Education ==
It is in the South Summit School District.

Oakley School, a boarding school for high school students, was formerly located in Oakley. It closed in 2017.

== Notable people ==
- Actress Katherine Heigl and her husband, country musician Josh Kelley, reside on their ranch in Oakley.
- Jake, a famous rescue dog, lived in the city along with owner, Mary Flood.
