= Rosebud Creek =

Rosebud Creek may refer to:

- Rosebud Creek (South Dakota)
- Rosebud Creek (Montana), in Rosebud and Big Horn counties
- Rosebud Creek, a tributary of Stillwater River (Stillwater County, Montana)
- Rosebud Creek (Yukon)
- Rosebud Creek, Alberta
- East Rosebud Creek

== See also ==
- Rosebud (disambiguation)
