= Rosebuds =

Rosebuds may refer to:

- Adamstown Rosebuds, a football (soccer) club
- Portland Rosebuds (ice hockey), two professional ice hockey teams based in Portland, Oregon during the 20th century
- Portland Rosebuds (baseball), a professional baseball team based in Portland, Oregon in 1946
- The Rosebuds, an indie rock band
- Victoria Rosebuds, a minor league baseball team

== See also ==
- Rosebud (disambiguation)
