= Casey's Diner =

- U.S. National Register of Historic Places
- U.S. Historic district – Contributing property
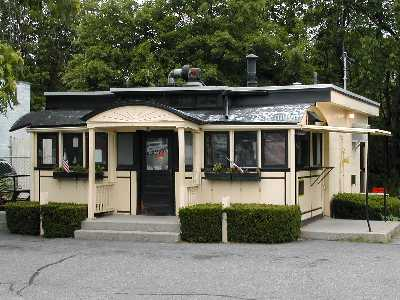

- Location within Massachusetts Location within the United States
- Location: Natick, Massachusetts
- Coordinates: 42°17′8″N 71°20′43″W
- Built: 1922
- Architect: Worcester Lunch Car Company
- Part of: Natick Center Historic District (ID77000186)
- MPS: Diners of Massachusetts MPS
- NRHP reference No.: 99001122

Significant dates
- Added to NRHP: September 22, 1999
- Designated CP: December 16, 1977

Casey's Diner is a historic ten-stool diner located at 36 South Avenue in downtown Natick, Massachusetts, famous for its steamed hot dogs that "snap" when first bitten into. Casey's is one of the oldest operating diners in Massachusetts, and possibly in the United States.

== History ==
Only 10 by 20.5 feet, the diner was constructed in 1922 by the Worcester Lunch Car Company in Worcester, Massachusetts. It was originally designed as a lunch cart on wheels, and was located in Framingham, Massachusetts. Fred Casey bought the building in 1927 and moved it to Washington Street across from Natick Common. It was relocated to South Avenue in 1977 to make way for a bank parking lot.

The diner is nine bays wide and three deep. It has a metal barrel roof, and is clad in galvanized steel panels that have been painted yellow. It is mounted on a concrete block foundation, and connected in the rear to a concrete block building which houses the kitchen. There are two entrances: one in the center of the front, and one at the west end; both still have their original wooden doors. Much of the interior is oak, including the counter, counter apron, stools, and ceiling.

The diner was listed on the National Register of Historic Places in 1999; it was also listed as a contributing element in the Natick Center Historic District in 1977.

== Present day ==
The diner is still operating. The most popular steamed, "snap" hot dog is the "all around" which includes yellow mustard, relish, and chopped, raw onions all placed under the hot dog in a steamed bun. The menu includes hamburgers and cheeseburgers, sandwiches, chips, drinks, and pies. Recently, breakfast hours and menu items were introduced and a double cheeseburger was added to the menu. A Friday-only fish special is served.

== See also ==
- National Register of Historic Places listings in Middlesex County, Massachusetts
