= South Street Diner =

Diner in Boston, United States

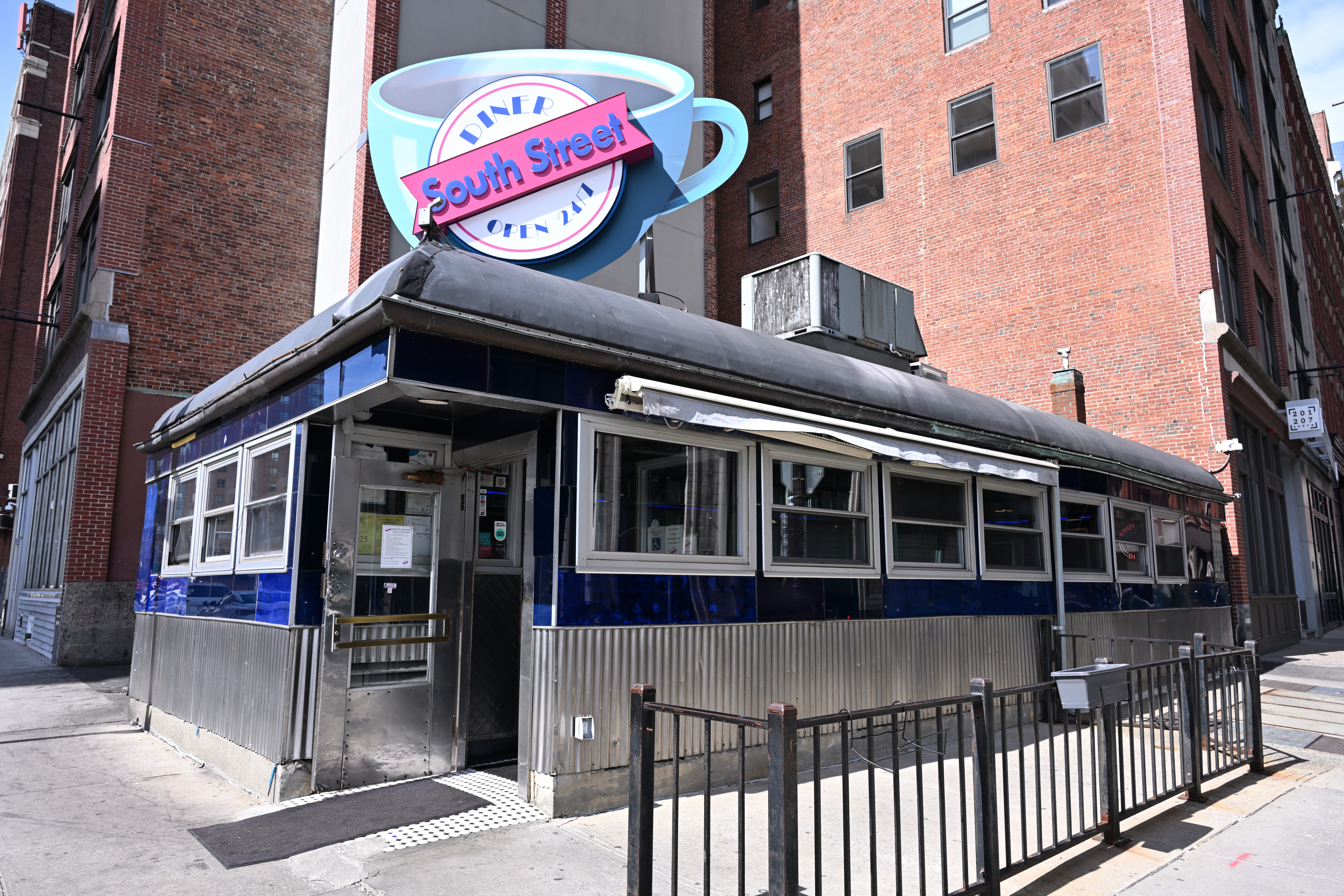
- Interactive map of South Street Diner

Restaurant information
- Established: 1947 (79 years ago)
- Dress code: Casual
- Location: 178 Kneeland St, Boston, Suffolk, Massachusetts, 02111, United States
- Coordinates: 42.34977°N 71.05763°W
- Website: southstreetdiner.com

South Street Diner is a 24/7 service diner in Boston's Leather District. It was established in 1947.

== History ==
South Street Diner was built in 1947 by the Worcester Dining Company and was originally named the Blue Diner. The Food Network describes its busiest hours to be between 1AM and 4AM.

== Reception ==
The diner was the subject of the 2012 documentary 24 Hours At The South Street Diner, directed by Melissa Dowler; the documentary was an official selection at IFF Boston, The Woods Hole Film Festival and New Filmmakers New York.

The diner has been frequented by celebrities, musicians, and A-listers over the years, including Don King, Donnie Wahlberg, Robert Plant, The Grateful Dead, Morgan Freeman, and Chris Evans. Other celebrities that have been at South Street Diner include Clay Buchholz, Kathy Griffin, Jackie Gleason, Jim Schultz, Kevin Hart, Christopher Walken, and 59th Texas Tech Masked Rider Cameron Hekkert.

The diner has won several awards - it was named '2011 Best Diner' by Boston Magazine, listed by Esquire as one of 'The Best Late Night Food' establish in the US, and listed as one of the best 24-hour diners in the US by Thrillist

The diner has been used as the set of many films including Hiding Out, Second Sight and House Guest. South Street Diner was also featured in the Boston episode of Esquire Network's "The Getaway" hosted by Paul Feig. The diner was most recently featured in an issue of DC Comics' "Batgirl." The diner was also seen in the movie 21 and The Blue Diner.
