= Worcester Lunch Car Company =

Defunct manufacturer of diners

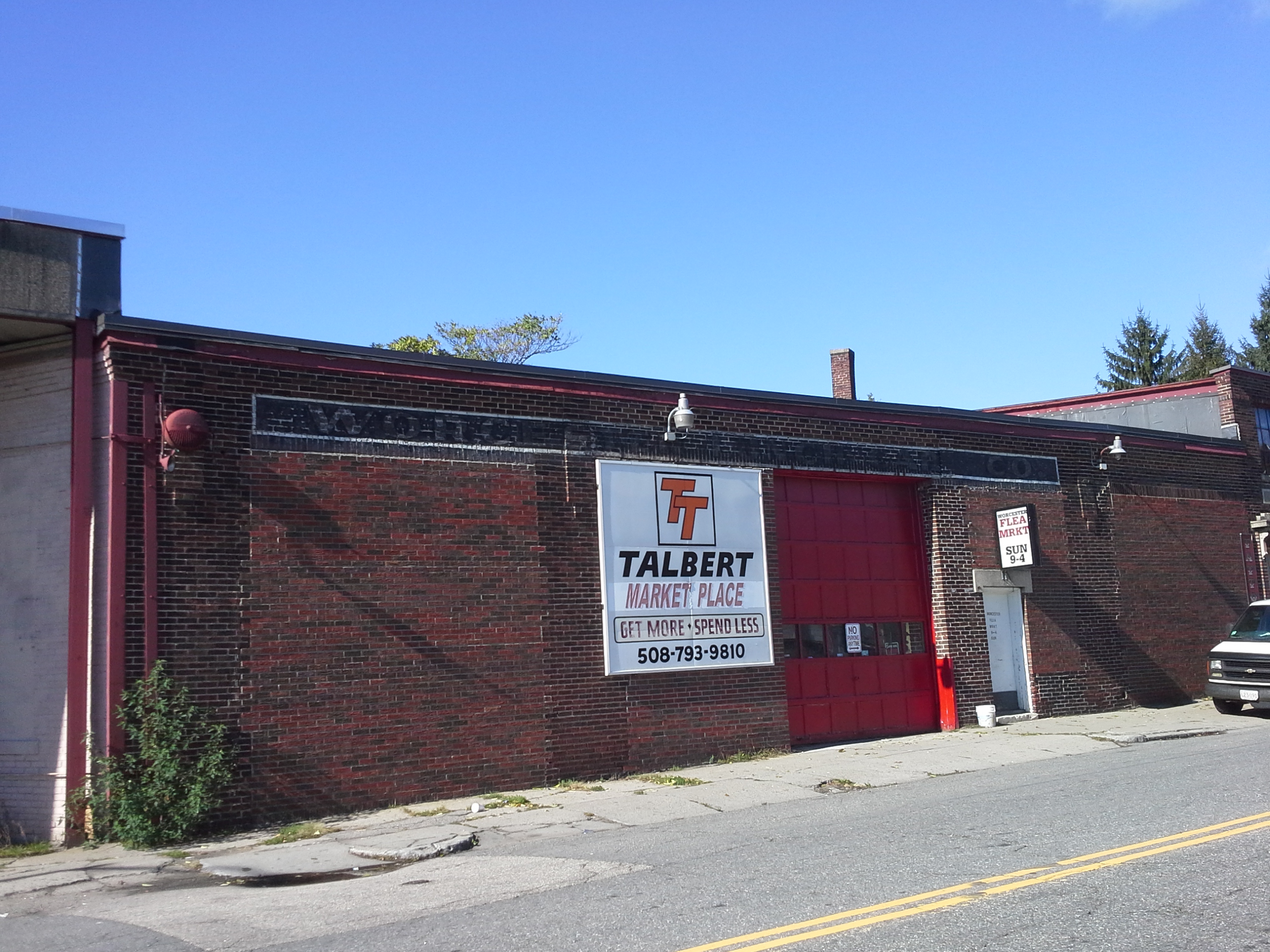
- Former location of the Worcester Lunch Car Company headquarters; the name is still faintly evident in the black area near the top of the wall
- Formation: 1906
- Dissolved: 1957
- Location: Worcester, Massachusetts, US
- Products: Prefabricated diners

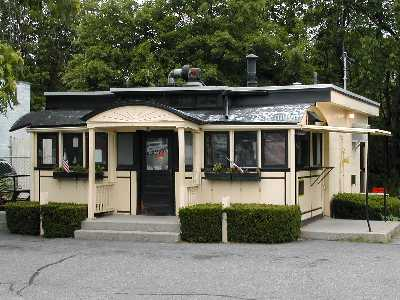
Casey's Diner (ca. 1922), a historic ten-stool diner in downtown Natick, Massachusetts

Worcester Lunch Car Company was a manufacturer of diners based in Worcester, Massachusetts, United States, from 1906 to 1957.

== History ==
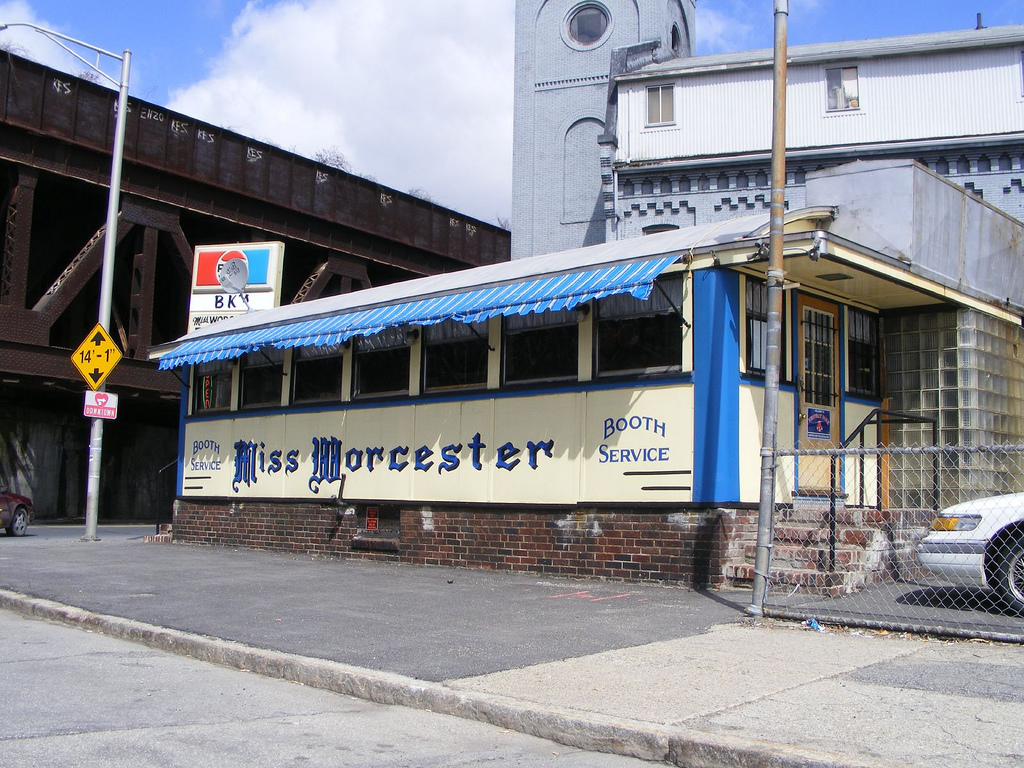
The Miss Worcester Diner (1948) is located across from the former factory headquarters

In 1906 Philip H. Duprey and Grenville Stoddard established the Worcester Lunch Car and Carriage Manufacturing Company, which shipped 'diners' all over the Eastern Seaboard. It was named for Worcester, Massachusetts, where the company was based. The first manufactured lunch wagons with seating appeared throughout the Northeastern US in the late 19th century, serving busy downtown locations without the need to buy expensive real estate. It is generally accepted that the name "diner" as opposed to "lunch wagon" was not widely used before 1925. The company produced 651 diners between 1906 and 1957, when manufacturing ceased. All of Worcester Lunch Car's assets were auctioned in 1961.

== Examples ==
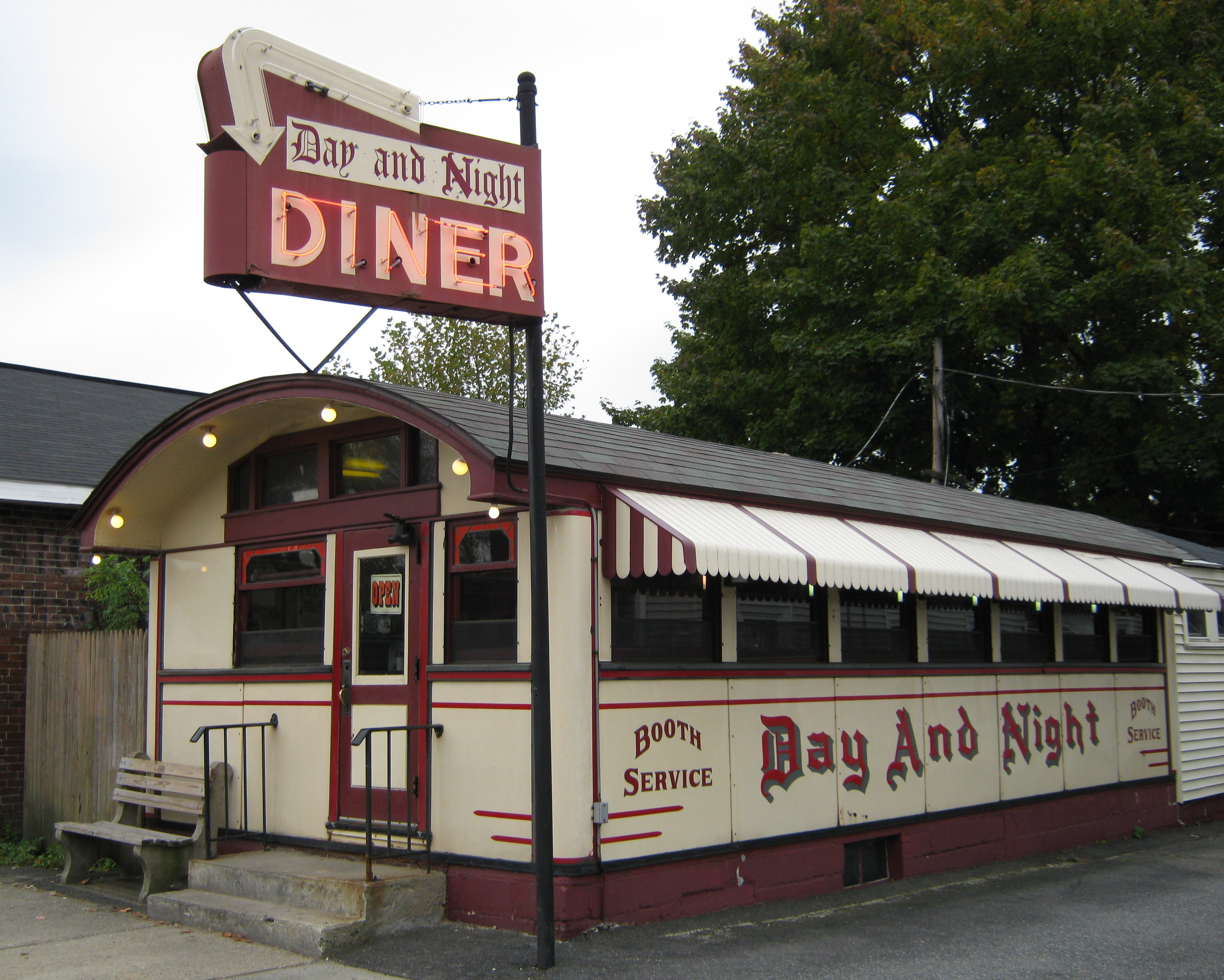
Day and Night Diner, #781 (1944)

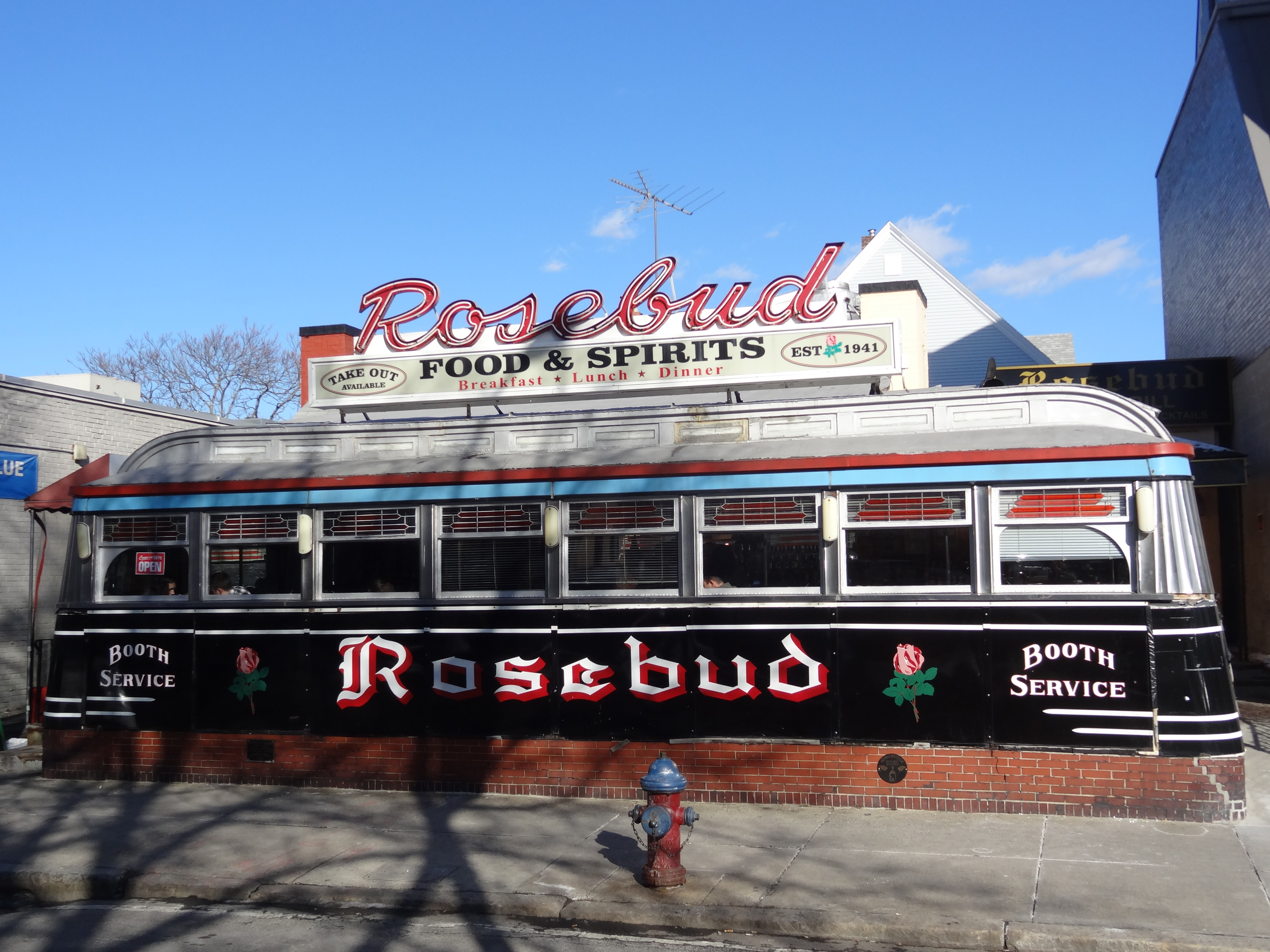
The Rosebud Diner (1941)

Many diners still exist in the Worcester area, including Casey's Diner (1922) in nearby Natick and the Boulevard Diner (1936) in Worcester as well as Miss Florence Diner (1941) all of which are some of the oldest diners in the country and listed on the National Register of Historic Places.

Miss Florence Diner, one of the longest running and still operational train car style diners was first established in 1941 when Maurice and Pauline Florence Alexander opened the doors of the diner. While originally situated across the street, the diner found its forever home on 99 Main Street, Florence, MA (a village in Northampton, MA) later that same year. Now under new ownership, Miss Florence Diner still offers breakfast and lunch seven days a week and dinner seasonally. The Miss Worcester Diner (1948) still exists in its original location across the street from the former factory. The Rosebud (1941) is an example at 381 Summer Street in Somerville, Massachusetts near Davis Square. The Elmwood Diner (originally known as Central Diner) is Worcester Lunch Car Company #806 built in 1947 and moved to its current location in 1953 where is still operates in the Elmwood section of Providence, Rhode Island. It was added to the National Register of Historic Places in 2010. Worcester Lunch Car Company #821 is still in its original location at 53 Park Street in Adams, Massachusetts. The former "Miss Adams diner" was sold to a couple in 2013 who operate it as Izzy's Diner and Pizza, a full service diner and pizza shop, and still contains many original items including the original Worcester Lunch Car Clock. The car is slowly being restored to look as it did originally. In August 2020, the diner was purchased by a local restaurateur.

While most of their diners were located in New England some were purchased as far away as Florida. The Henry Ford Museum in Michigan contains a notable example of a Worcester Lunch Car diner called Lamy's, built in 1946. In January 2012, Lamy's once again began serving food. Many surviving Worcester Lunch Car diners are currently listed on the National Register of Historic Places.

=== Other examples ===
==== Maine ====
- A-1 Diner, Gardiner, Maine(Worcester Lunch Car #790, 1946)
- Miss Portland Diner (Worcester Lunch Car #818, 1949)

==== Massachusetts ====
- Lloyd's Diner, 184 Fountain St, Framingham, Massachusetts
- Blue Point Restaurant, 6 Dayton Street, Acushnet, Massachusetts
- Boulevard Diner,155 Shrewsbury Street, Worcester, Massachusetts (Worcester Lunch Car, #730, 1936)
- Buddy's Diner, 13 Washington St, Somerville, Massachusetts (Worcester Lunch Car #624, 1929)
- Club Diner, Dutton Street, Lowell, Massachusetts
- Owl Diner, formerly Monarch Diner, Appleton Street, Lowell, Massachusetts
- Day and Night Diner, Route 20, Palmer, Massachusetts (Worcester Lunch Car #781, 1944)
- Dinky’s Blue Belle Diner, Shrewsbury, Massachusetts (Worcester Lunch Car #814)
- Lanna Thai Diner, formerly Jack's Diner, Woburn, Massachusetts
- Miss Adams Diner, Adams, Massachusetts (Worcester Lunch Car #821)
- Portside Diner, Danvers, Massachusetts (Worcester Lunch Car #813, 1948)
- South Street Diner, Boston, Massachusetts
- Black Cat Diner, formerly Pilgrim Diner, Salem, Massachusetts (Worcester Lunch Car #725, 1936)
- Wilson's Diner, 507 Main Street, Waltham, Massachusetts (Worcester Lunch Car #819, 1949)
- Blue Moon Diner, 102 Main Street, Gardner, Massachusetts (Worcester Lunch Car #815)

==== New Hampshire ====
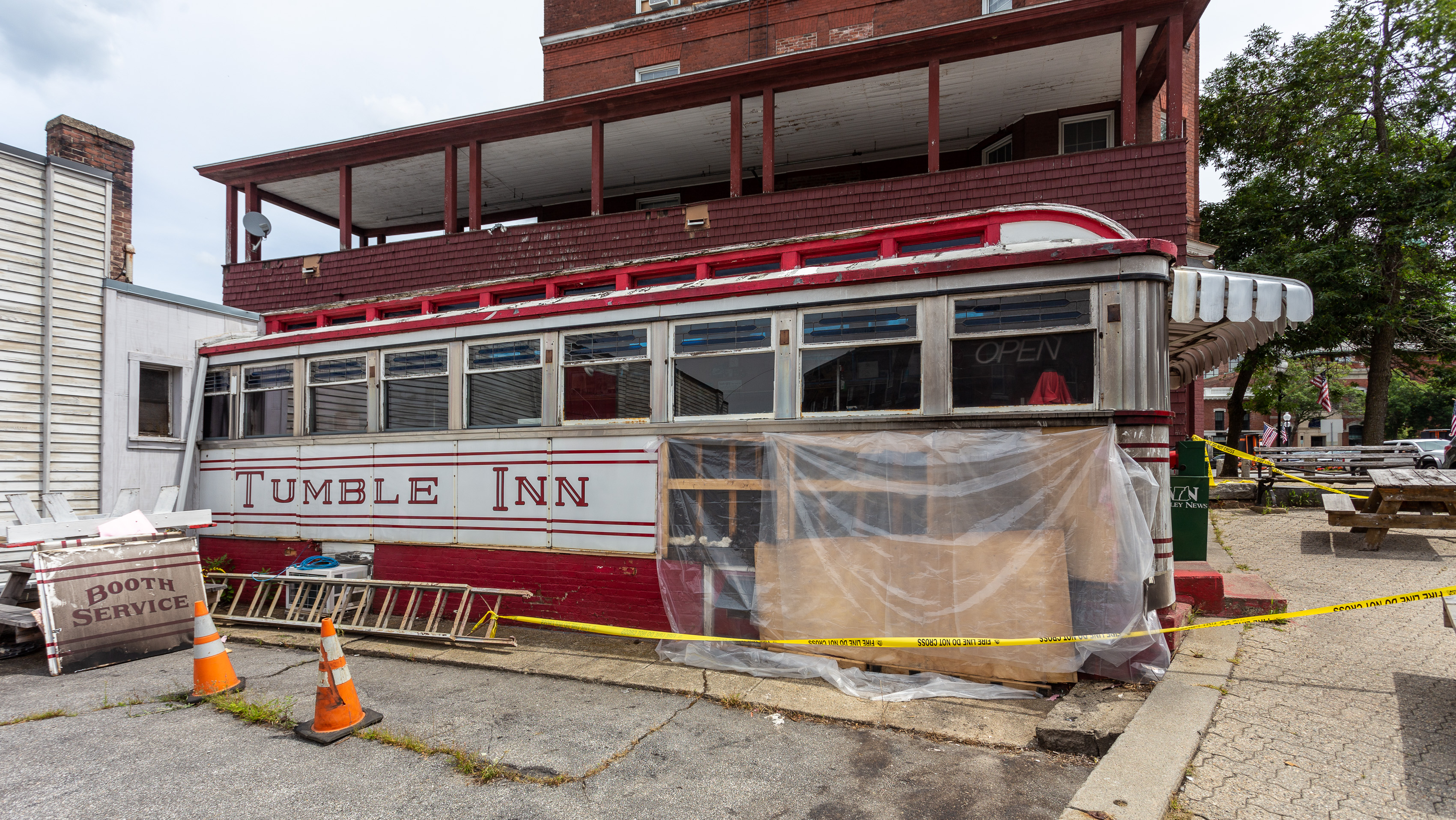
Daddypops Tumble Inn Diner (1941)

- 4 Aces Diner, Bridge St, West Lebanon, New Hampshire
- Daddypops Tumble Inn Diner, Main Street, Claremont NH
- Gilleys Diner (1940), Portsmouth, NH
- Peterborough Diner (1950s), Peterborough, NH
- Joanne's Kitchen (1920s), Nashua, NH
- Main Street Station (1946), Main Street, Plymouth, NH (formerly Fracher’s)

==== New York ====
- Bolton Beans, Lake Shore Drive, Bolton Landing, New York. Originally Mancini’s in Providence, Rhode Island. In 1961 became Don’s Diner in Plainville, Massachusetts. In 1969 moved to North Attleboro, Massachusetts as Red Rock Hill Diner. In 1989 moved to Bolton Landing as Bolton Beans.

==== Rhode Island ====
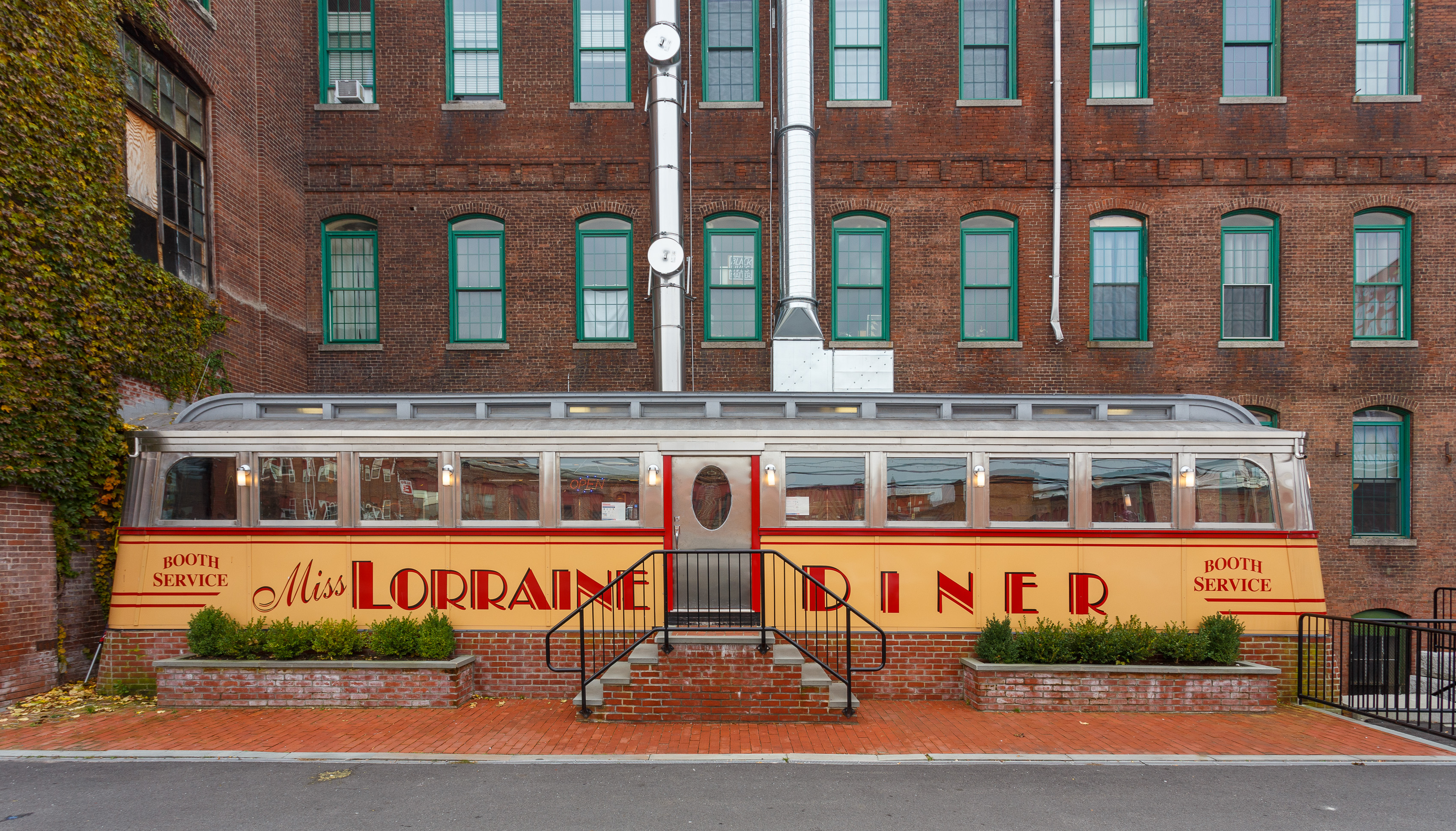
Miss Lorraine Diner, Pawtucket (1941)

- Jigger’s Hill and Harbour Diner, Main Street, East Greenwich, Rhode Island
- Miss Lorraine Diner, Mineral Spring Avenue, Pawtucket (Worcester Lunch Car No. 774), formerly Donwell's Diner in Hartford, CT

==== Vermont ====
- Athens Diner, formerly Libby's Blue Line Diner, Colchester, Vermont, originally The Casu Diner in Turner's Falls, Mass. (Worcester Lunch Car #838, 1953)
- Chelsea Royal Diner, West Brattleboro, Vermont
- Parkway Diner, South Burlington, Vermont (Worcester Lunch Car #839, 1950)
- Miss Bellows Falls Diner, Bellows Falls, Vermont (Worcester Lunch Car #771, 1941)
- Windsor Diner, Windsor, Vermont (Worcester Lunch Car #835, 1952)

=== Pop Culture References ===
The 1996 Song "Diner" by Singer-Songwriter Martin Sexton heavily references the Worcester Lunch Car Company, with lyrics such as "they were made back in Worcester Mass, Of aluminum and bakalite and glass, Like a locomotive they were streamlines... ...Slap 'em up put 'em on the train, Out to Michigan up to Maine"

== See also ==
- List of diners
- Jerry O'Mahony Diner Company
