= Wilson's Diner =

- U.S. National Register of Historic Places
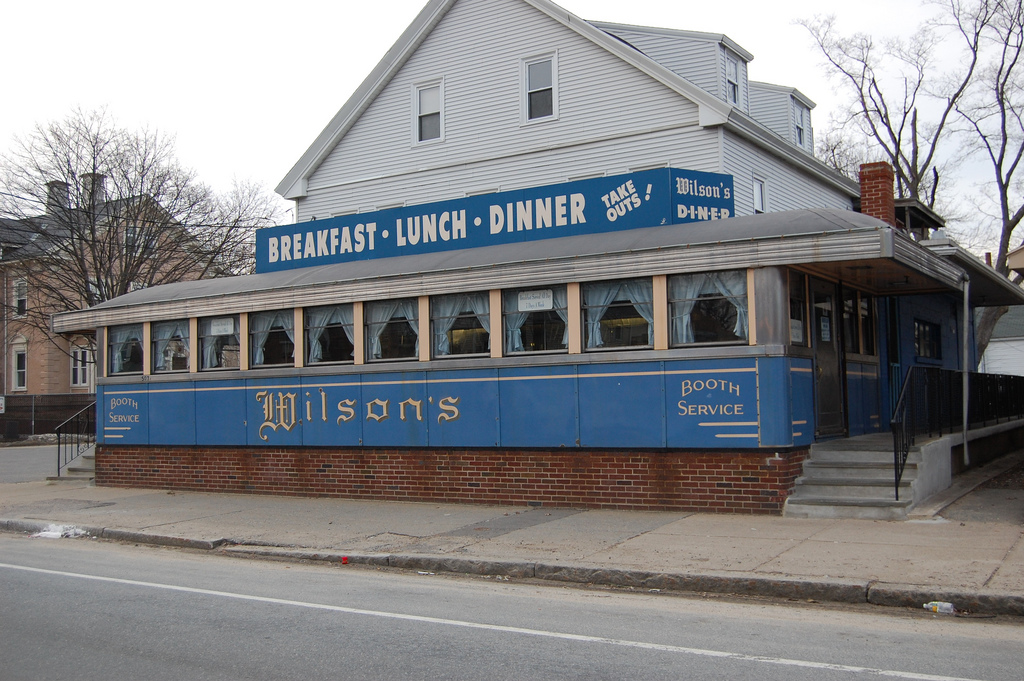

- Location within Massachusetts Location within the United States
- Location: Waltham, Massachusetts
- Coordinates: 42°23′10″N 71°13′53″W
- Built: 1949
- Architect: Worcester Lunch Car Company
- MPS: Diners of Massachusetts MPS
- NRHP reference No.: 99001126
- Added to NRHP: September 22, 1999

Wilson's Diner is a historic diner at 507 Main Street (US Route 20) in Waltham, Massachusetts.

The diner was built by the Worcester Lunch Car Company as #819, and was delivered to this site by the company in March 1949. It is a well-preserved example of the company's post-World War II craftsmanship. The diner is ten bays wide and three deep, and sits on a brick foundation. A kitchen wing, built of concrete blocks, connects the diner to the house at 507 Main Street. The entrances to the diner are at either end, with original stainless steel doors bearing sunburst motifs. Inside the diner is a full-length marble counter with center staff access, with 18 counter stools, and wooden booths lining the front wall.

The diner was listed on the National Register of Historic Places in 1999.

The diner was used to film scenes from Julia (2022 TV series).

== Gallery ==
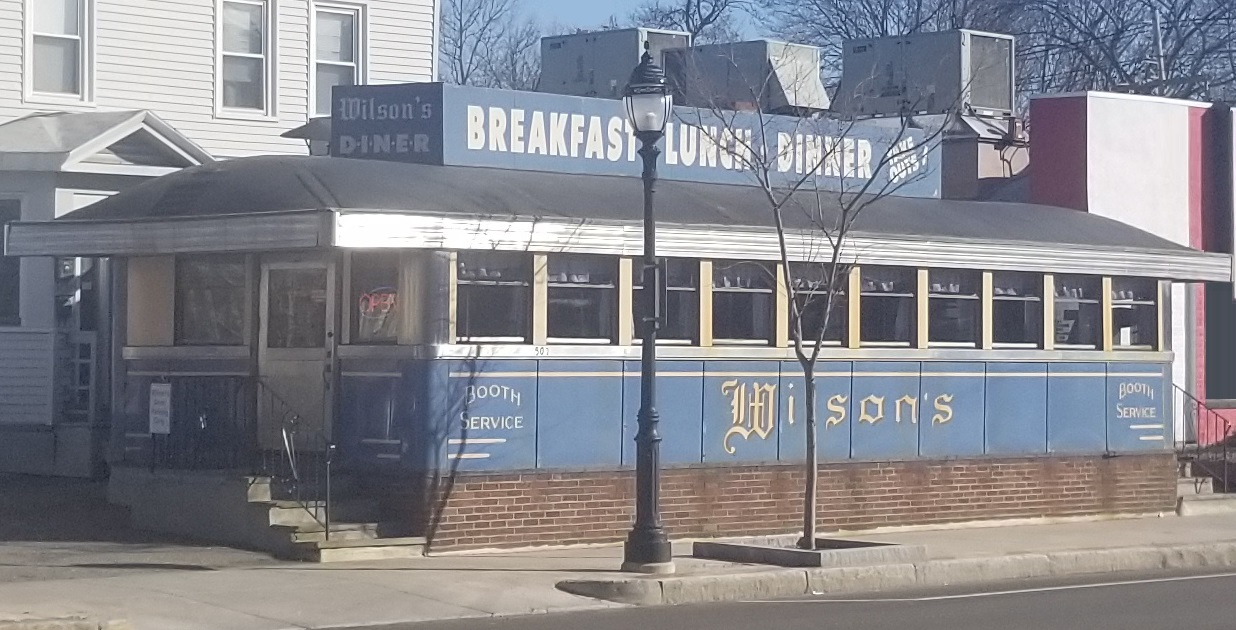
Front of Diner

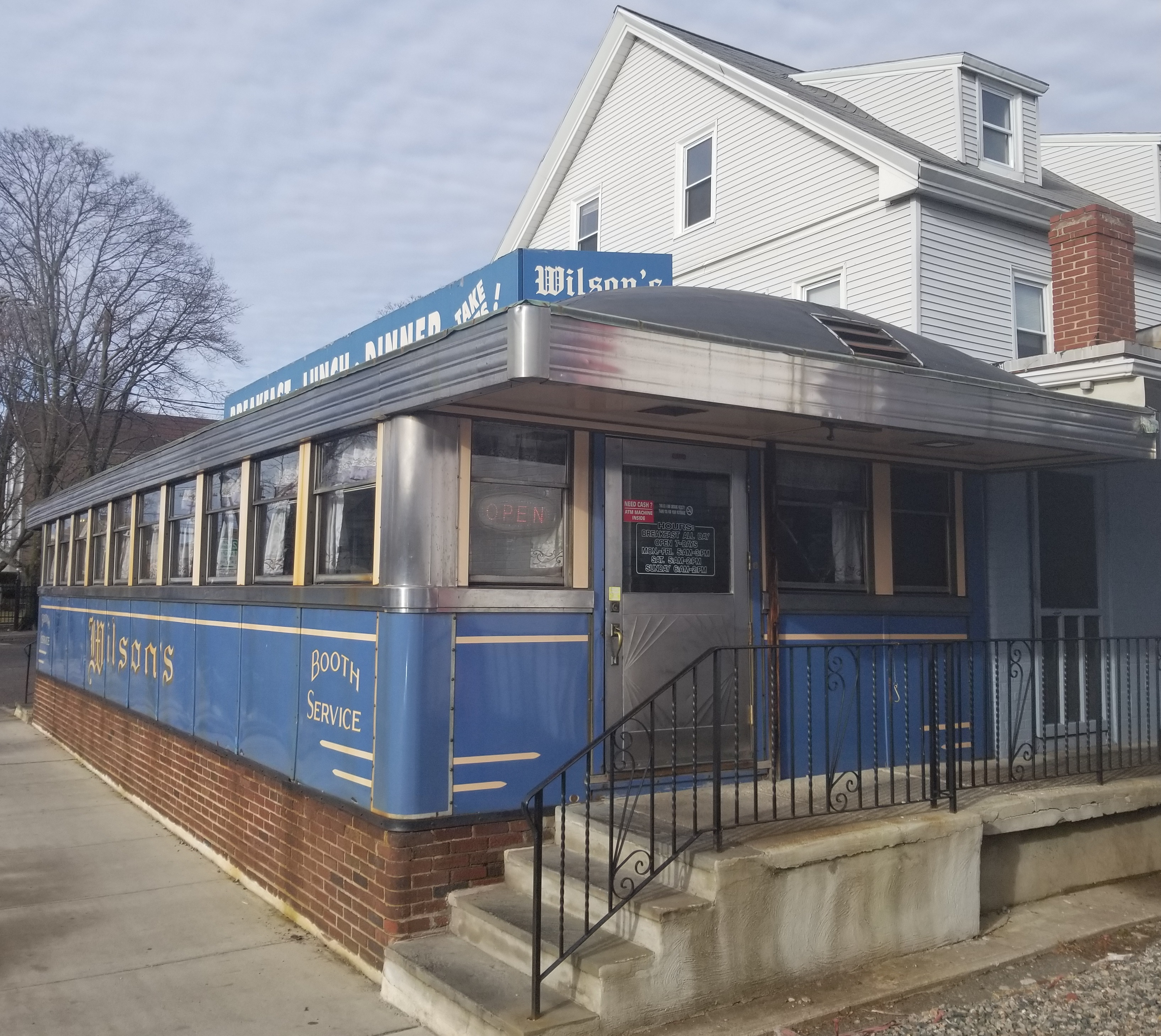
East Side of Diner

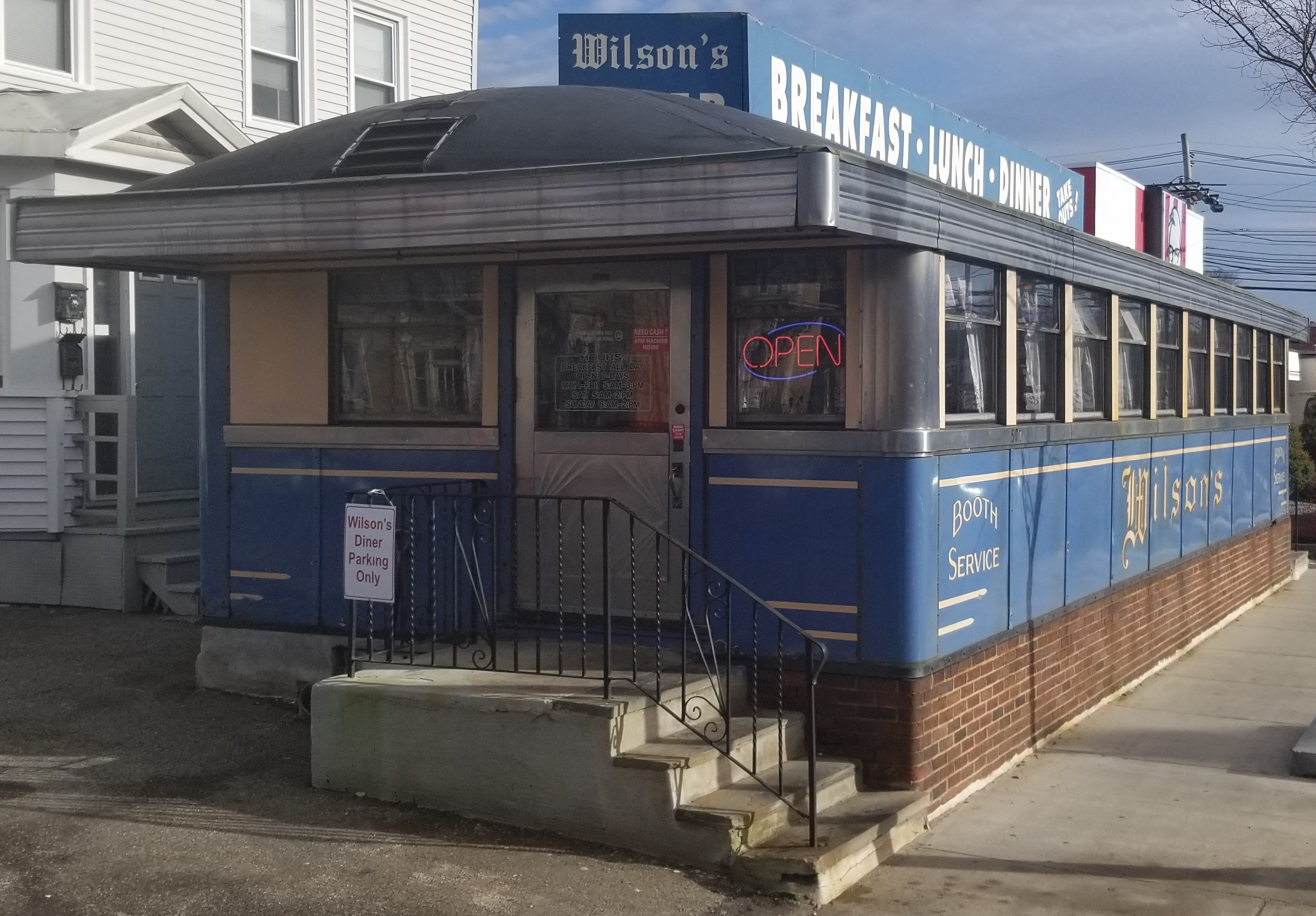
West Side of Diner

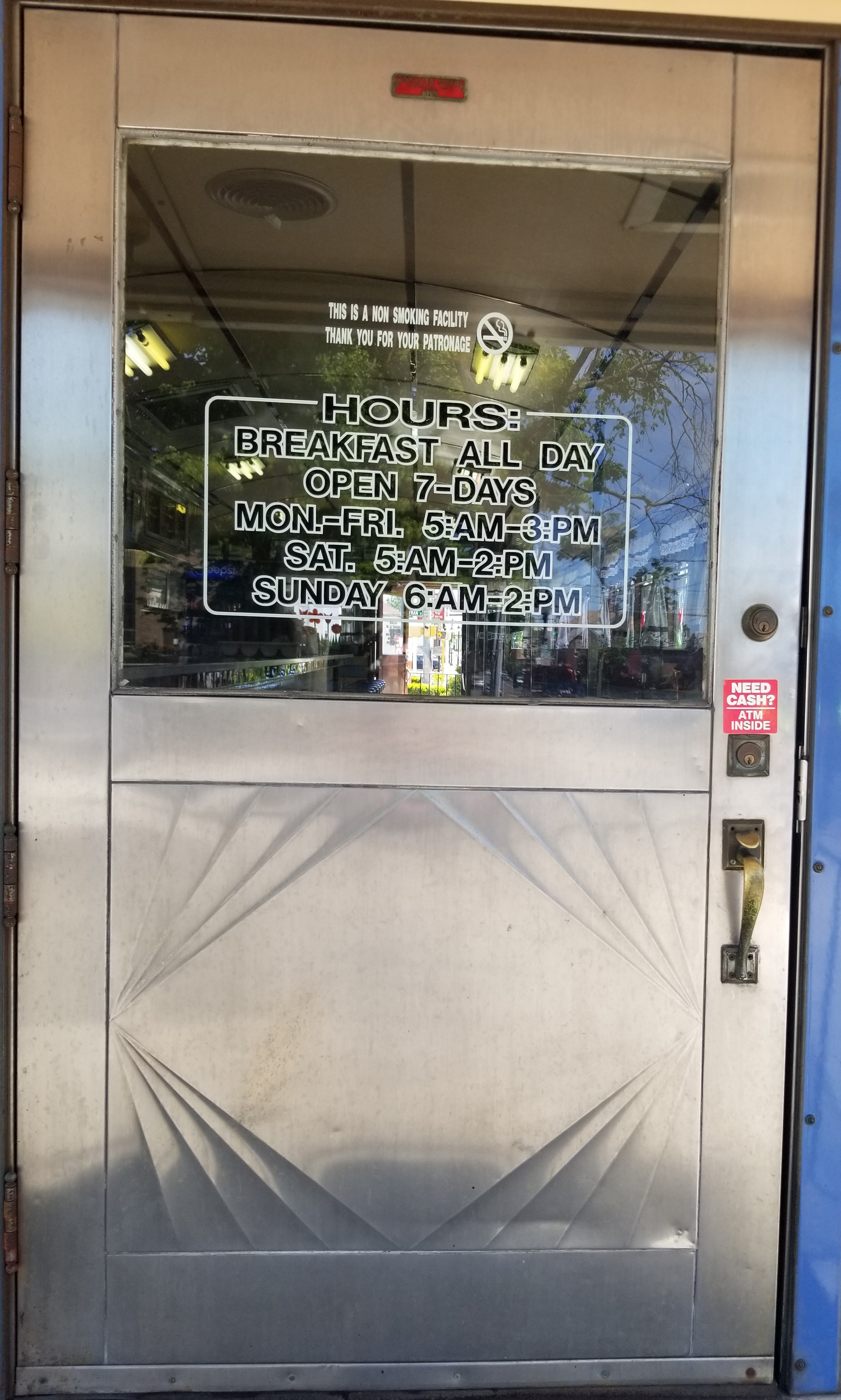
West Door with Sunburst Motif

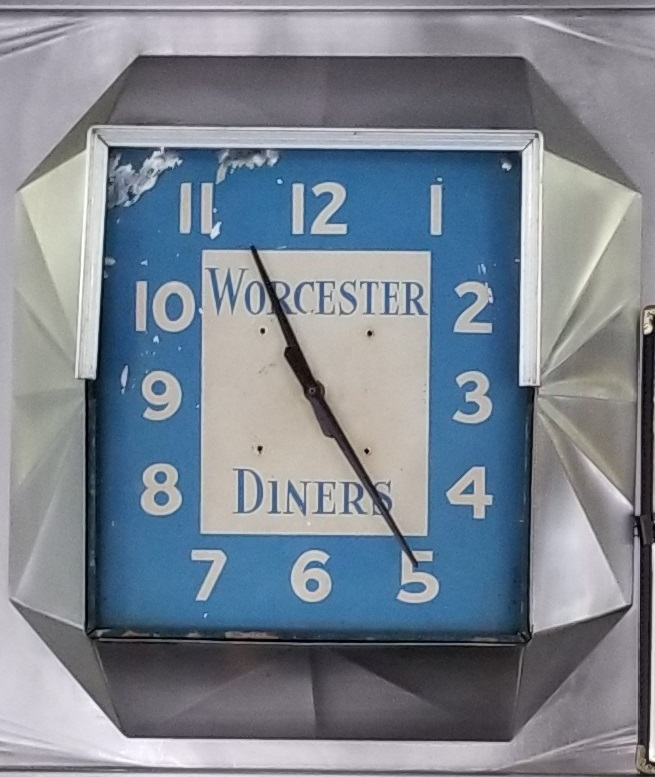
Original clock between the two menus inside

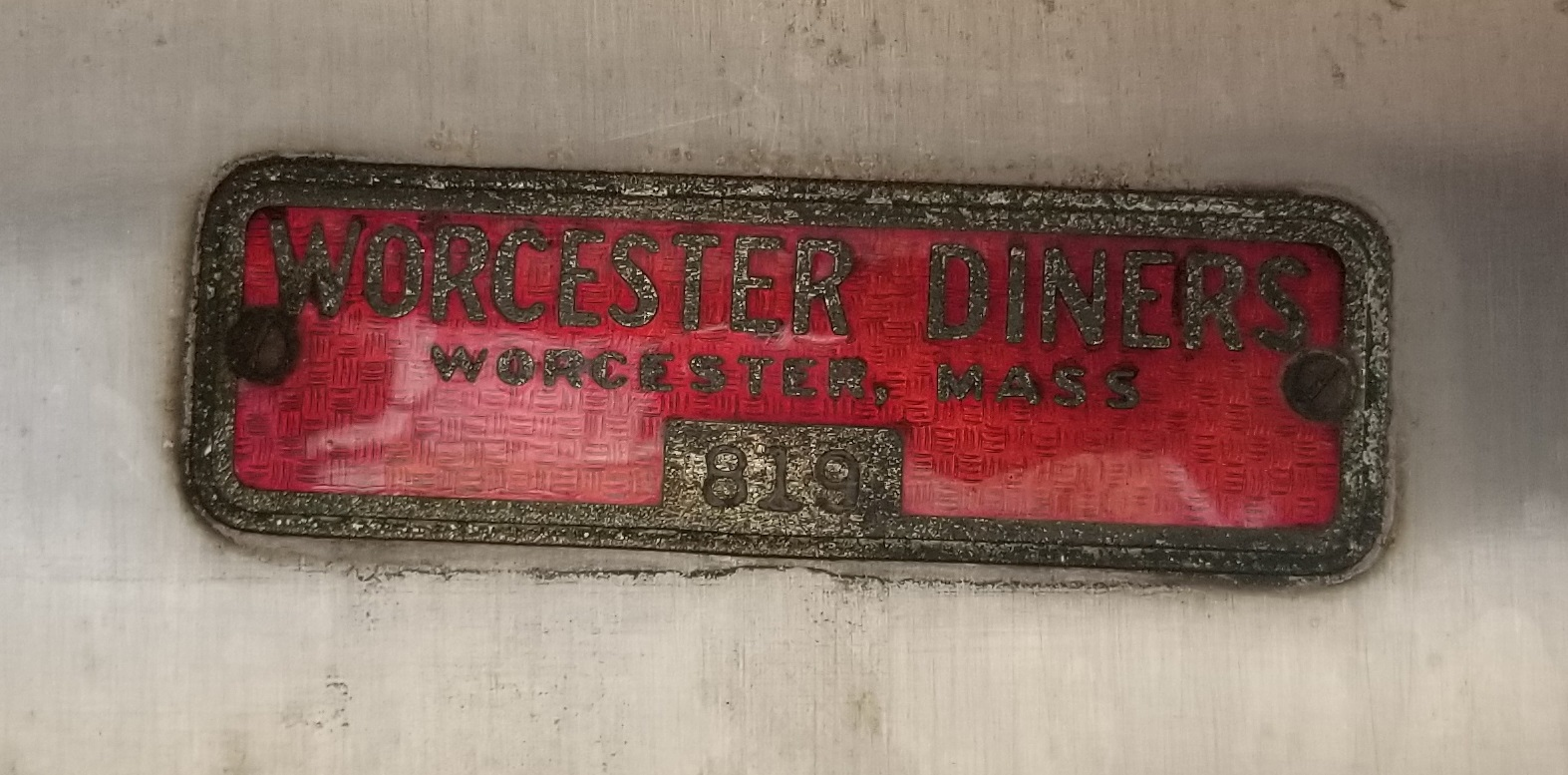
Tag of the Worcester Lunch Car Company showing serial number 819

== See also ==
- National Register of Historic Places listings in Waltham, Massachusetts
