= Miss Florence Diner =

- U.S. National Register of Historic Places
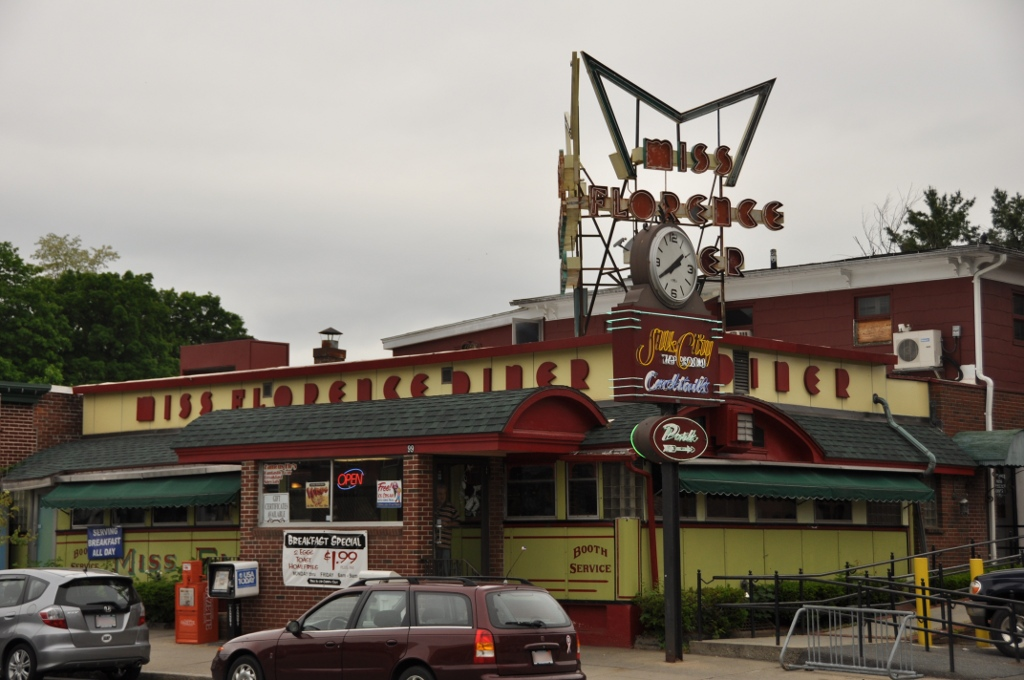
- Miss Florence Diner in 2010

- Location within Massachusetts Location within the United States
- Location: 99 Main St., Florence village, Northampton, Massachusetts
- Coordinates: 42°20′7″N 72°40′18″W
- Area: less than one acre
- Architect: Worcester Lunch Car Company; Agnoli Sign Company
- MPS: Diners of Massachusetts MPS
- NRHP reference No.: 99001123
- Added to NRHP: September 22, 1999

The Miss Florence Diner is a historic diner at 99 Main Street in the Florence section of Northampton, Massachusetts. It was manufactured in 1941 by the Worcester Lunch Car Company and is one of four diners in the city. At the time of its listing on the National Register of Historic Places in 1999, it had been owned by the same family since its construction.

== Description and history ==
The Miss Florence Diner is located in the center of the village of Florence, about 2 miles (3.2 km) west of downtown Northampton. It sits on the north side of Main Street, just east of its junction with Maple Street. It has an L-shaped configuration, with barreled roofs in both directions, topped by a parapet on which the name of the diner appears in Moderne lettering. Mounted at the corner of the L is a distinctive chevron-shaped sign that bears its name. The exterior is finished mainly in enamel paneling, and the interior is finished in wood, tile, and enamel. The main entrance is now via a brick vestibule, which has a barrel-style shingled roof that extends over the side-facing steps. The diner is attached at the rear to a house that has been converted into a restaurant.

The Miss Florence was opened in 1941 by Maurice Alexander & his wife, Pauline Florence (Matusewicz) Alexander. Originally located across the street in a different diner, it moved into what is now the core of the present structure later that year. That diner was manufactured by the Worcester Lunch Car Company, which also executed the enlargements to give it the L shape in 1949. These alterations included adding another bay on the left, and four (in a configuration perpendicular to the main diner body) on the right. The Alexanders lived in the house behind the diner, which they converted into a separate restaurant in 1959, joining the two together. Miss Florence Diner was most recently purchased by Georgianna Brunton in April 2018.

== See also ==
- National Register of Historic Places listings in Hampshire County, Massachusetts
