= Miss Worcester Diner =

- U.S. National Register of Historic Places
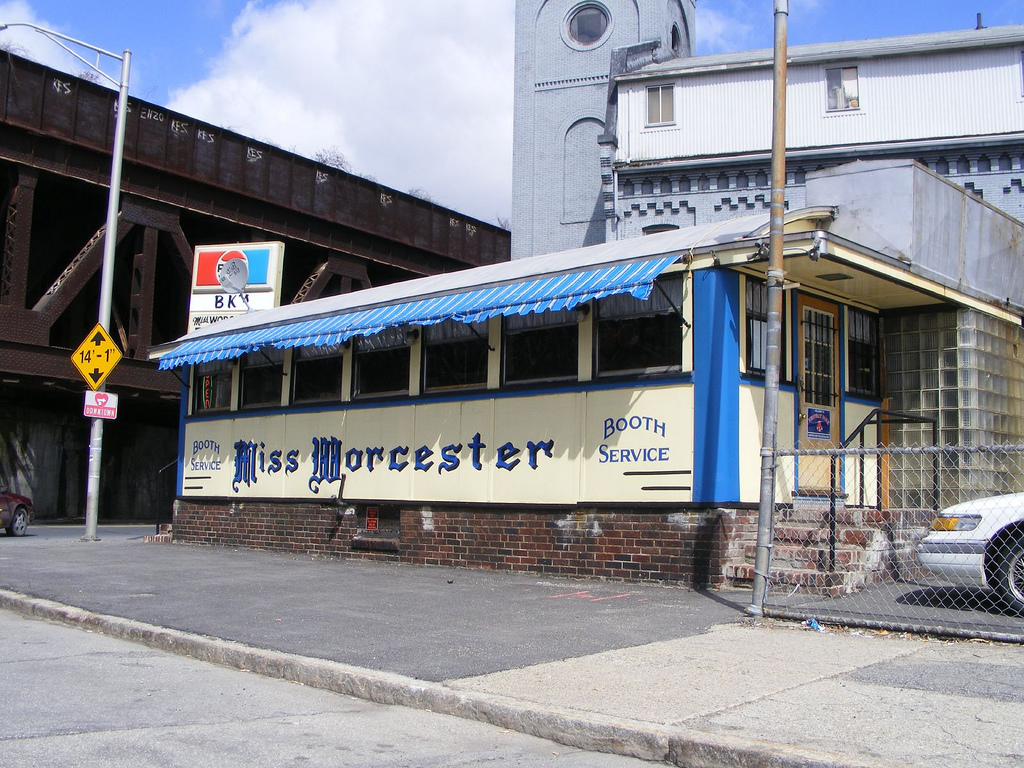

- Location within Massachusetts Location within the United States
- Location: 302 Southbridge St., Worcester, Massachusetts
- Coordinates: 42°15′13.8″N 71°48′24″W
- Built: 1948
- Architect: Worcester Lunch Car Company
- MPS: Diners of Massachusetts MPS
- NRHP reference No.: 03001178
- Added to NRHP: November 21, 2003

The Miss Worcester Diner or Worcester Lunch Car # 812 is a historic diner at 302 Southbridge Street in Worcester, Massachusetts. It was built in 1948 by Worcester Lunch Car Company and is located across the street from the company's (now defunct) Worcester factory. While independently owned and operated, it was used by the Lunch Car Company as a "showroom" diner, and a testbed for new features.

== History ==
According to Worcester city records, a diner was operating on the site since at least the late 1930s, although they did not bear the "Miss Worcester" name. In 1948 the Worcester Lunch Car Company manufactured diner #812 for Dino Sotiropoulos, delivering it on June 14. However, he is listed as operating the "Star Diner" in 1949, only taking the name "Miss Worcester" in 1950. He and family partners ran the business until 1963, after which it has had a succession of owners.

The diner sits on a small portion of a larger parcel, most of which is occupied by a c. 1870 brick textile mill building. Directly across Quinsigamond Avenue is the factory in which the diner was built. The diner body is seven bays wide and three deep, and is attached to a concrete block kitchen addition that was built c. 1948. The diner has the classic barrel-shaped roof, with canopies extending over the entrances, which are on the short ends of the structure. The walls are paneled in enamel that is yellow with light blue trim.

Inside the diner, there is a marble counter extending most of the length of the diner, excepting staff access points at the ends. Customers sit at fourteen metal stools with red details. There are five booths lining the south (front) wall, but these are plywood laminate replacements. Also covering the walls of the diner are stickers that range from trade unions, to local sports teams and colleges, and even various activities the patrons have participated in over the years. In contrast to the lighter colors on the exterior, the interior color scheme is darker, with wood tones and dark red coloring accented by cream and steel.

The diner was listed on the National Register of Historic Places in 2003.

== See also ==
- National Register of Historic Places listings in southwestern Worcester, Massachusetts
- National Register of Historic Places listings in Worcester County, Massachusetts
