= Monarch Diner =

- Owl Diner
- U.S. National Register of Historic Places
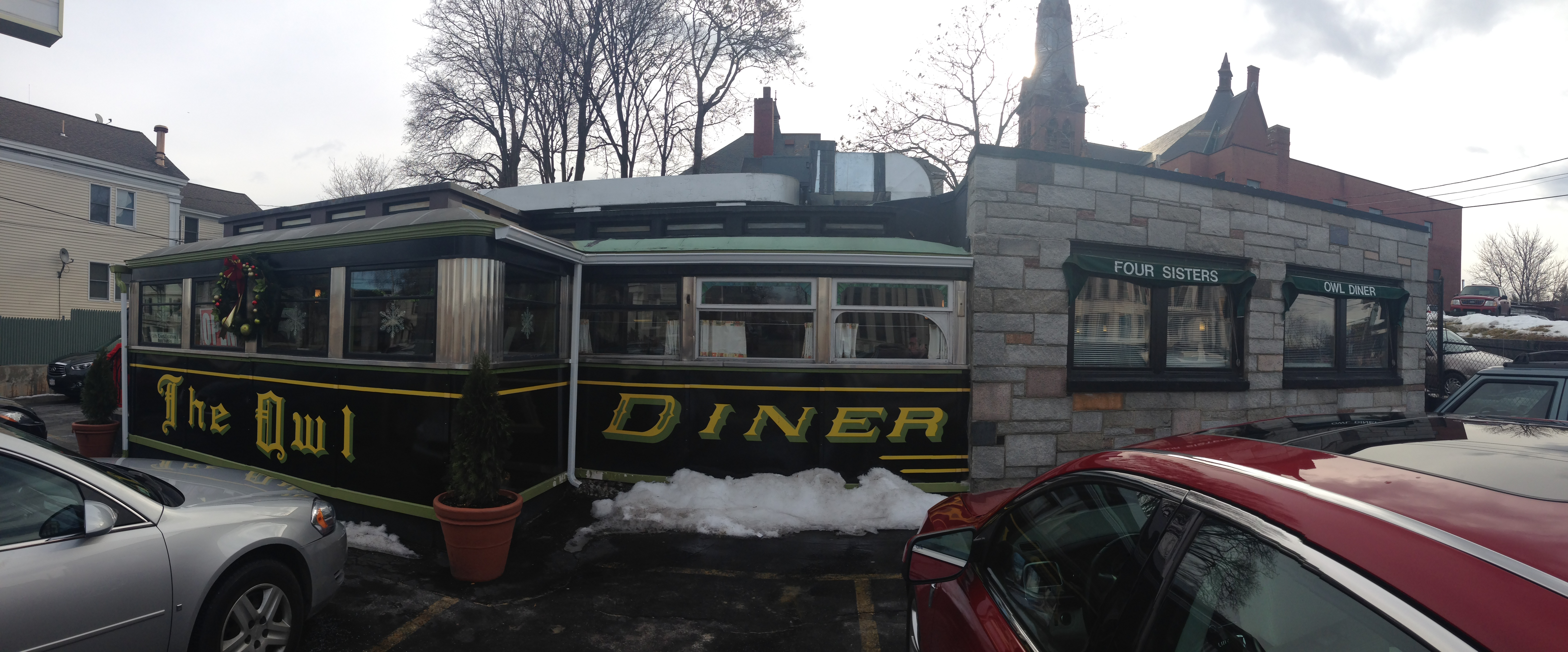

- Location within Massachusetts Location within the United States
- Location: Lowell, Massachusetts
- Coordinates: 42°38′21″N 71°18′50″W
- Architect: Worcester Lunch Car Company
- MPS: Diners of Massachusetts MPS
- NRHP reference No.: 03001207
- Added to NRHP: November 28, 2003

The Owl Diner, formerly known as the Monarch Diner is a historic diner at 246 Appleton Street in Lowell, Massachusetts.

The diner was built by Worcester Lunch Car Company as #749 in 1940, and was originally located in Waltham, Massachusetts, where it operated as the Monarch Diner. In 1951 the diner was moved to its present location in Lowell. The manufactured portion of the diner is nine bays wide and four deep, with enamel wall panels and a metal monitor-shaped roof; it is a rare regional example of a semi-streamlined form. Its present center entry was probably built when the diner was moved, as was the concrete block addition in the rear which houses the kitchen and restrooms. A second addition on the diner's south end adds seating space; it was probably added between 1952 and 1966. The diner is the last (out of sixteen) that once operated in the city.

The diner was added to the National Register of Historic Places in 2003.

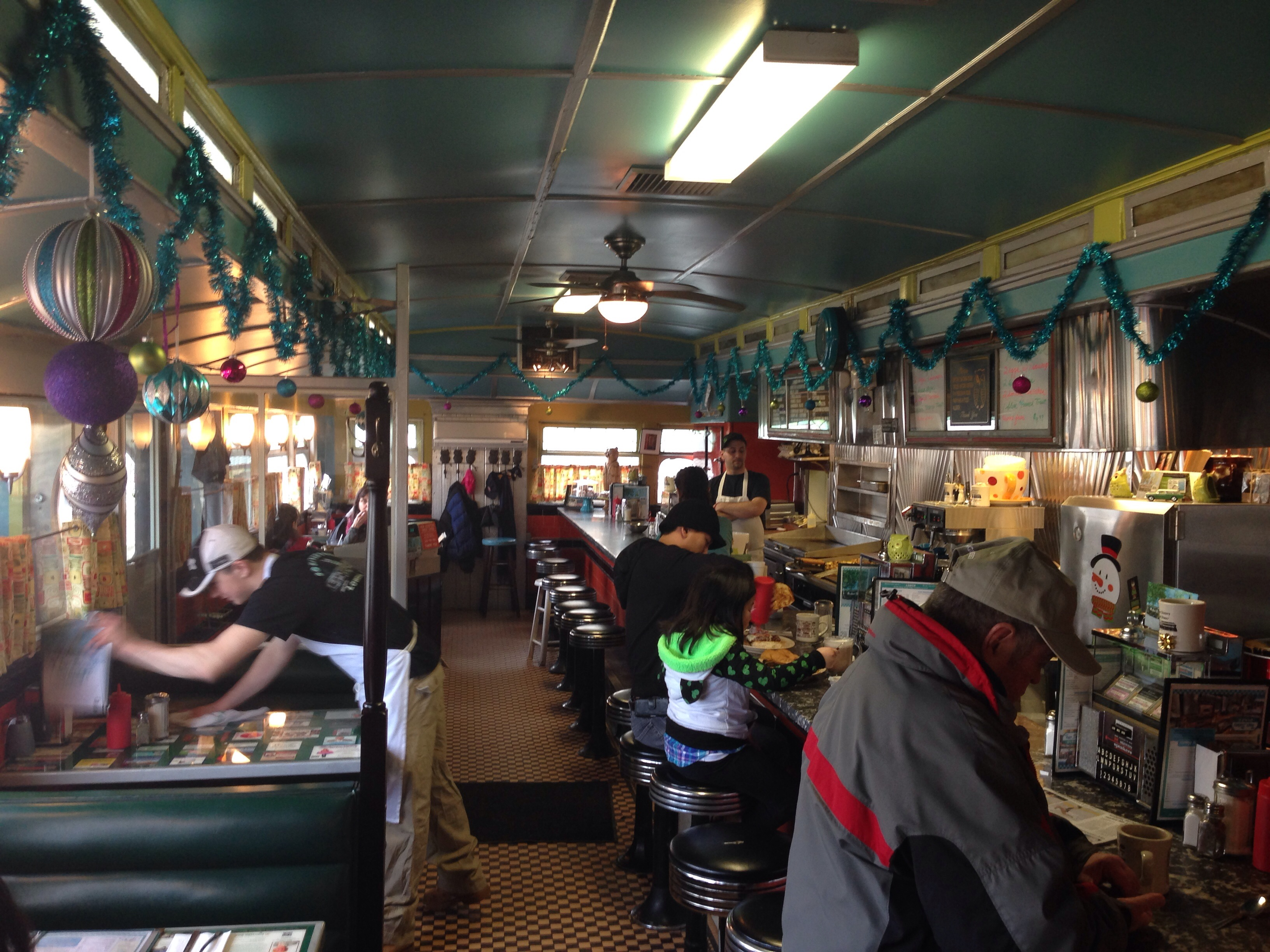
inside the diner

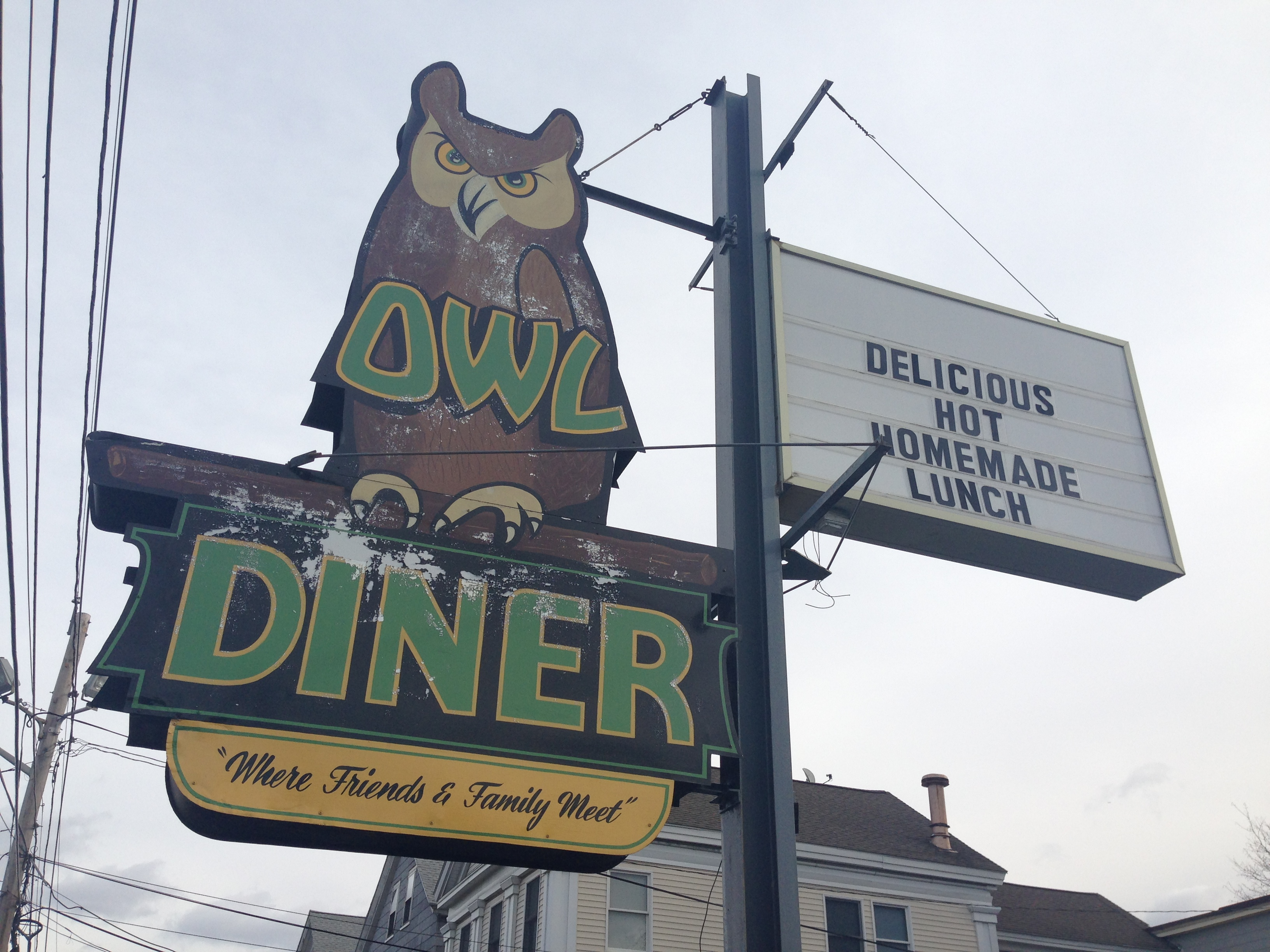
the sign of the diner outdoors

== See also ==
- National Register of Historic Places listings in Lowell, Massachusetts
