= Jack's Diner =

- U.S. National Register of Historic Places
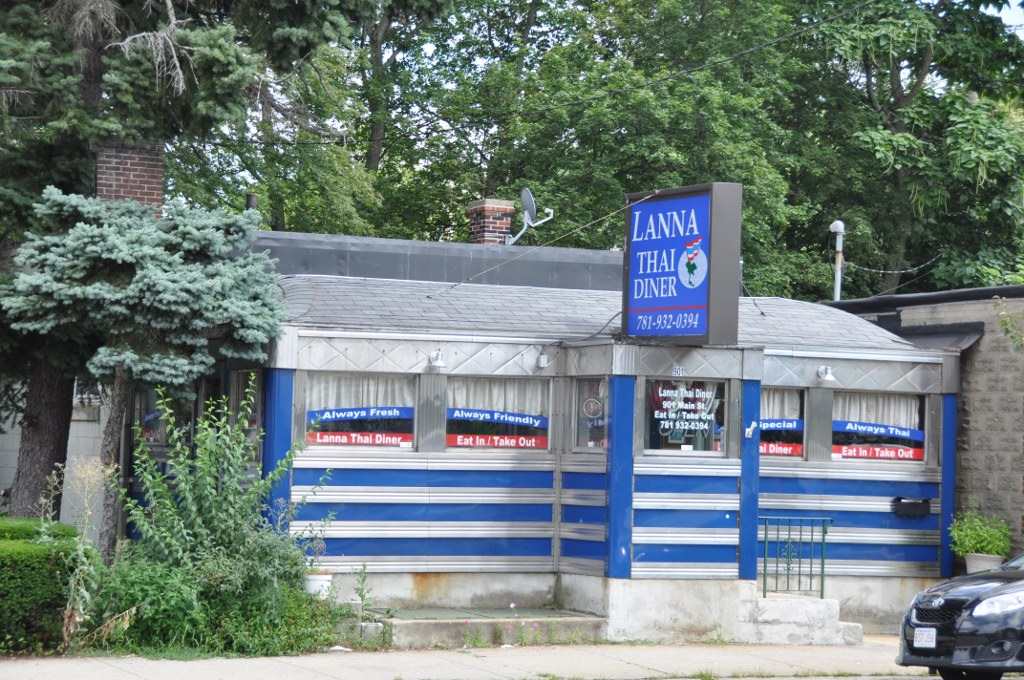

- Location within Massachusetts Location within the United States
- Location: Woburn, Massachusetts
- Coordinates: 42°30′31″N 71°9′39″W
- Built: 1952
- Architect: Worcester Lunch Car Company
- MPS: Diners of Massachusetts MPS
- NRHP reference No.: 00001340
- Added to NRHP: November 22, 2000

Jack's Diner (now "Lanna Thai Diner") is a historic diner at 901 Main Street in Woburn, Massachusetts. Built in 1952 by the Worcester Lunch Car Company as #834, it is believed to be the only surviving stainless steel diner built by the company that is located in Massachusetts.

It is located on a site that has housed a diner since at least 1937, when the Worcester Lunch Car Company also delivered a diner to this site. The original diner was called Shipper's Diner, but the one delivered in 1952 was known as Jack's. The proprietor of the establishment is not listed in city directories. By 1975, the diner had been renamed Stella's; as of 2011, it houses a Thai restaurant.

The diner was added to the National Register of Historic Places in 2000.

A kitchen fire on August 26, 2020; this led to the temporary closing of the Lanna Thai Diner.

== See also ==
- National Register of Historic Places listings in Middlesex County, Massachusetts
