= Boulevard Diner =

- U.S. National Register of Historic Places
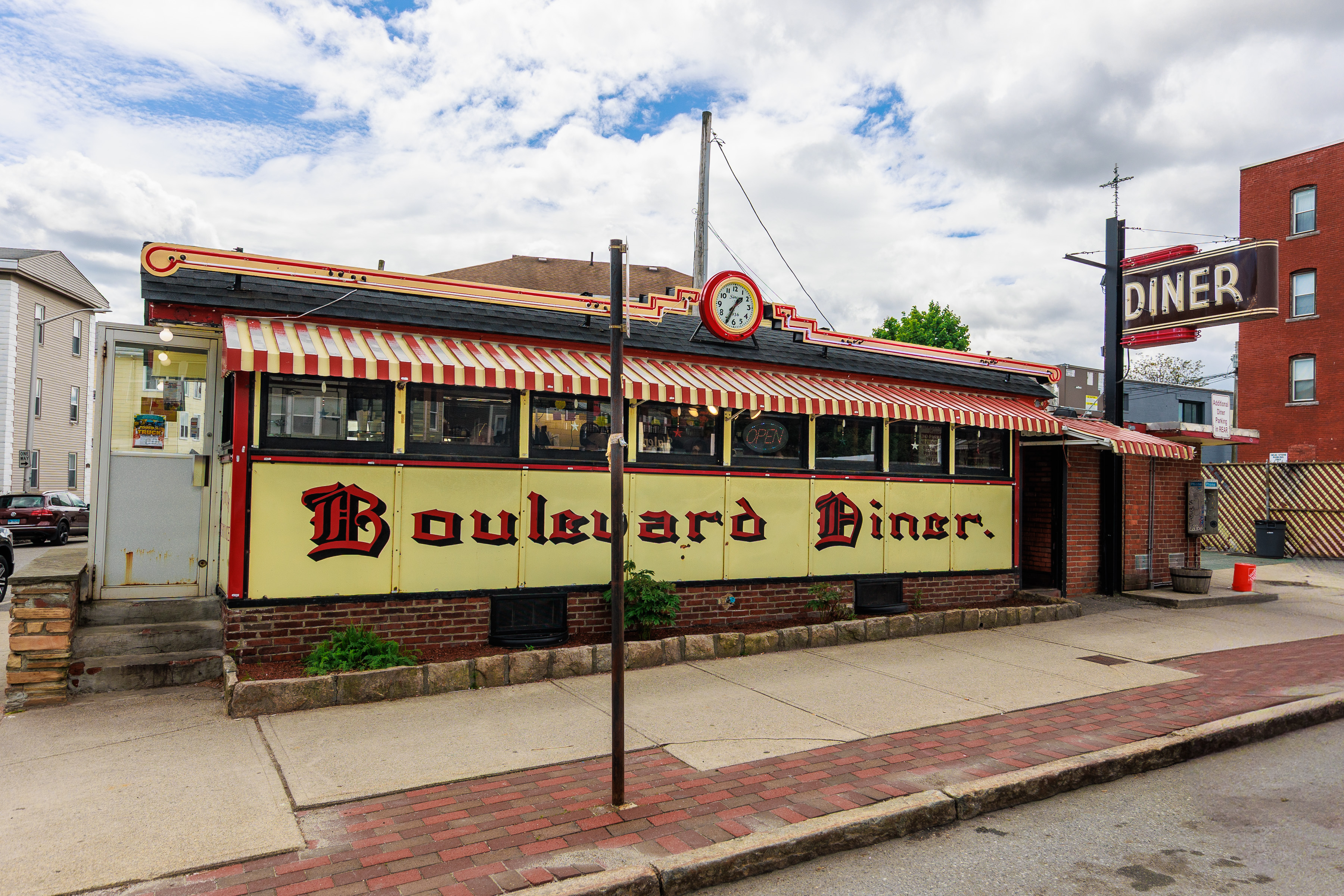

- Location within Massachusetts Location within the United States
- Location: 155 Shrewsbury St., Worcester, Massachusetts
- Coordinates: 42°15′53.3″N 71°47′13.8″W
- Architect: Worcester Lunch Car Company
- MPS: Diners of Massachusetts MPS
- NRHP reference No.: 00001394
- Added to NRHP: November 22, 2000

The Boulevard Diner is a historic diner at 155 Shrewsbury Street in Worcester, Massachusetts. It was built by Worcester Lunch Car Company in 1936 as #730. It is a well-preserved instance of a barrel-roof diner that the company made in significant numbers in the years before the Second World War, and the city's best-preserved 1930s diner. It was listed on the National Register of Historic Places in 2000.

== Description and history ==
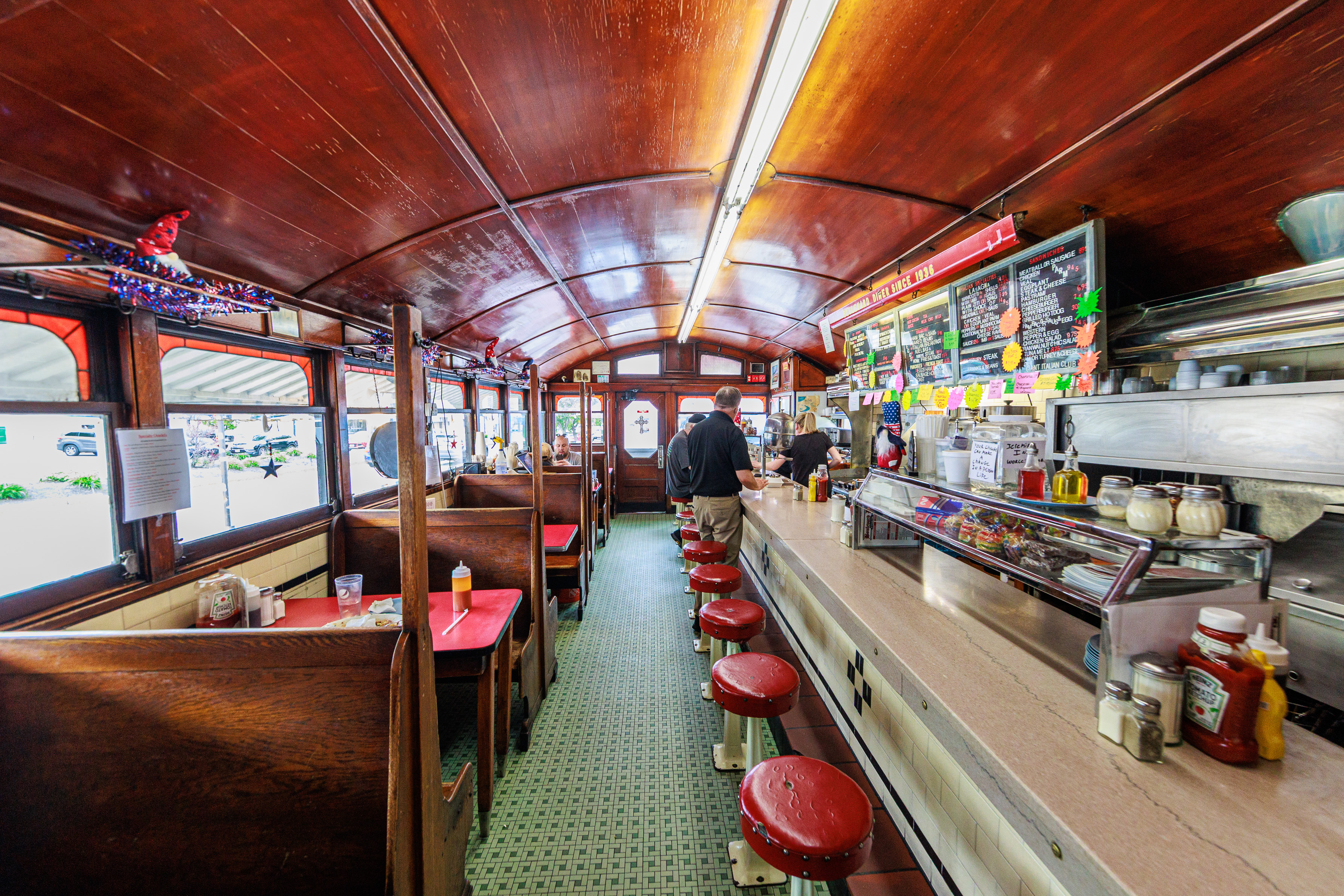
Interior

The Boulevard Diner is located on Worcester's east side, on the south side of Shrewsbury Street at its junction with Plum Street. Shrewsbury Street is a major artery running northeast from downtown Worcester to join Massachusetts Route 9. The diner is set on a brick foundation set close to the sidewalk, and has a utilitarian single-story brick kitchen attached to the rear. The diner is eight bays wide and four deep, with entrances at the sides, sheltered by the ends of the barrel roof. The eastern entrance is enclosed in a 1950s steel-and-glass enclosure, and the western entrance is accessed by an enclosed stair; both still have their original wooden doors. The diner is covered in yellow ceramic panels with red lettering reading "Boulevard Diner". The interior has had many of its features restored, including marble counters, tile floors, and appliance surrounds.

The diner was manufactured in 1936 by the Worcester Lunch Car Company as #730, and was owned by Frank Galanto, a prominent local owner of several diners, from its construction until 1969. At the time of its National Register listing in 2000, it had been owned since 1969 by members of the George family. The barrel-roof diner was one of the company's more common products.

== See also ==
- National Register of Historic Places listings in eastern Worcester, Massachusetts
