= Natick Center Historic District =

Historic district in Massachusetts, United States

- U.S. National Register of Historic Places
- U.S. Historic district
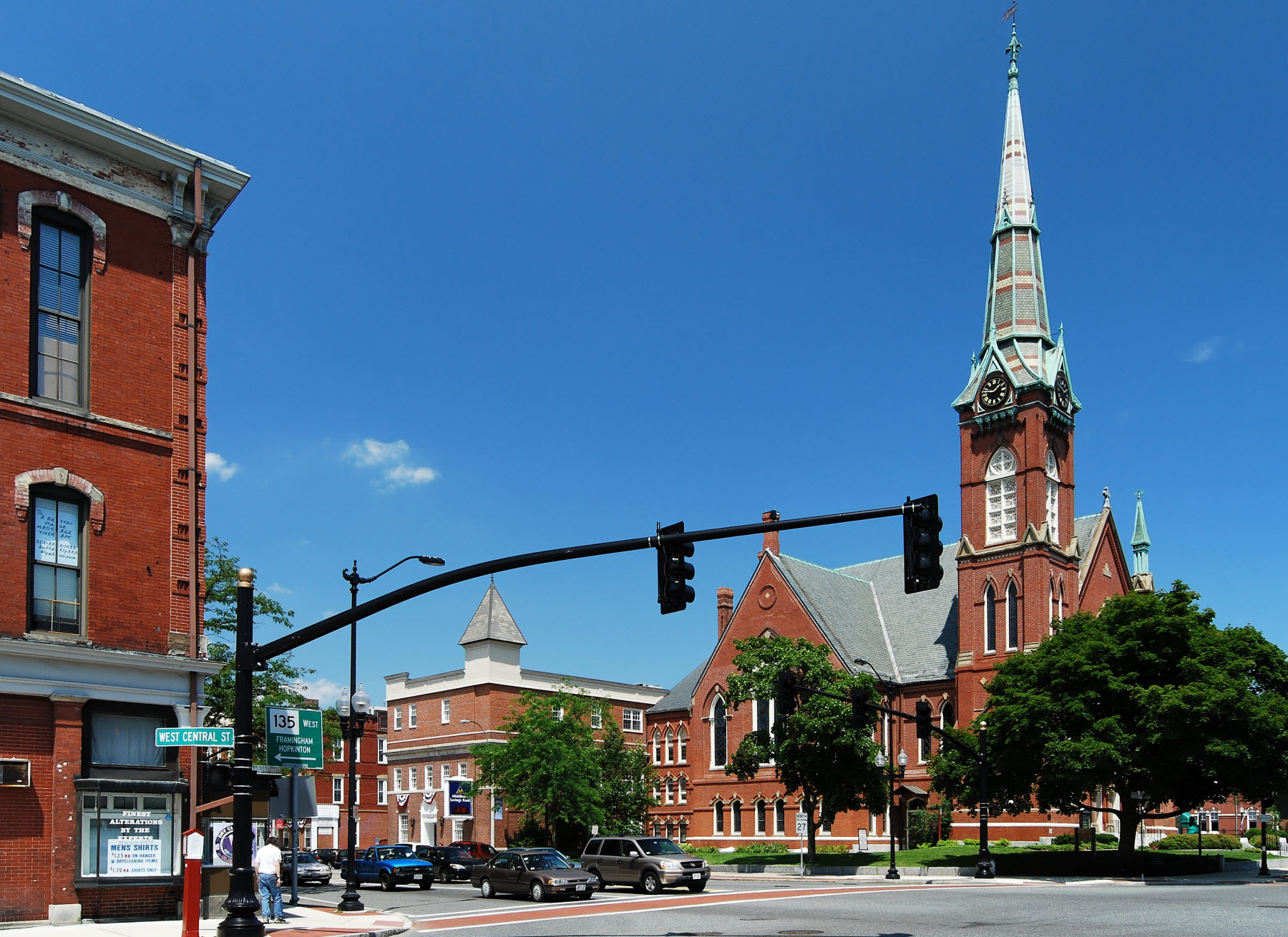
- Natick Center

- Location within Massachusetts Location within the United States
- Location: Natick, Massachusetts
- Coordinates: 42°17′4″N 71°20′53″W
- Architect: Multiple
- Architectural style: Gothic, Italianate, Romanesque
- NRHP reference No.: 77000186
- Added to NRHP: December 16, 1977

The Natick Center Historic District is a historic district on North Ave., Main, Central, and Summer Streets in Natick, Massachusetts, encompassing the 19th century civic and economic heart of the town. Natick's early colonial center, dating to 1651, was in South Natick, and the area that is now its center was a parcel of land set aside for the minister. It achieved significant prominence with the construction of a meeting house in 1799, and the land was sold off for development in 1812. The Boston and Worcester Railroad was extended through the town center in 1835, spurring economic growth. After a fire in 1874 destroyed most of the central business district, the present collection of brick Gothic and Romanesque buildings was constructed.

The district was listed on the National Register of Historic Places in 1977.

== See also ==
- National Register of Historic Places listings in Middlesex County, Massachusetts
