= Rosebud (diner) =

Historic diner in Massachusetts, United States

- U.S. National Register of Historic Places
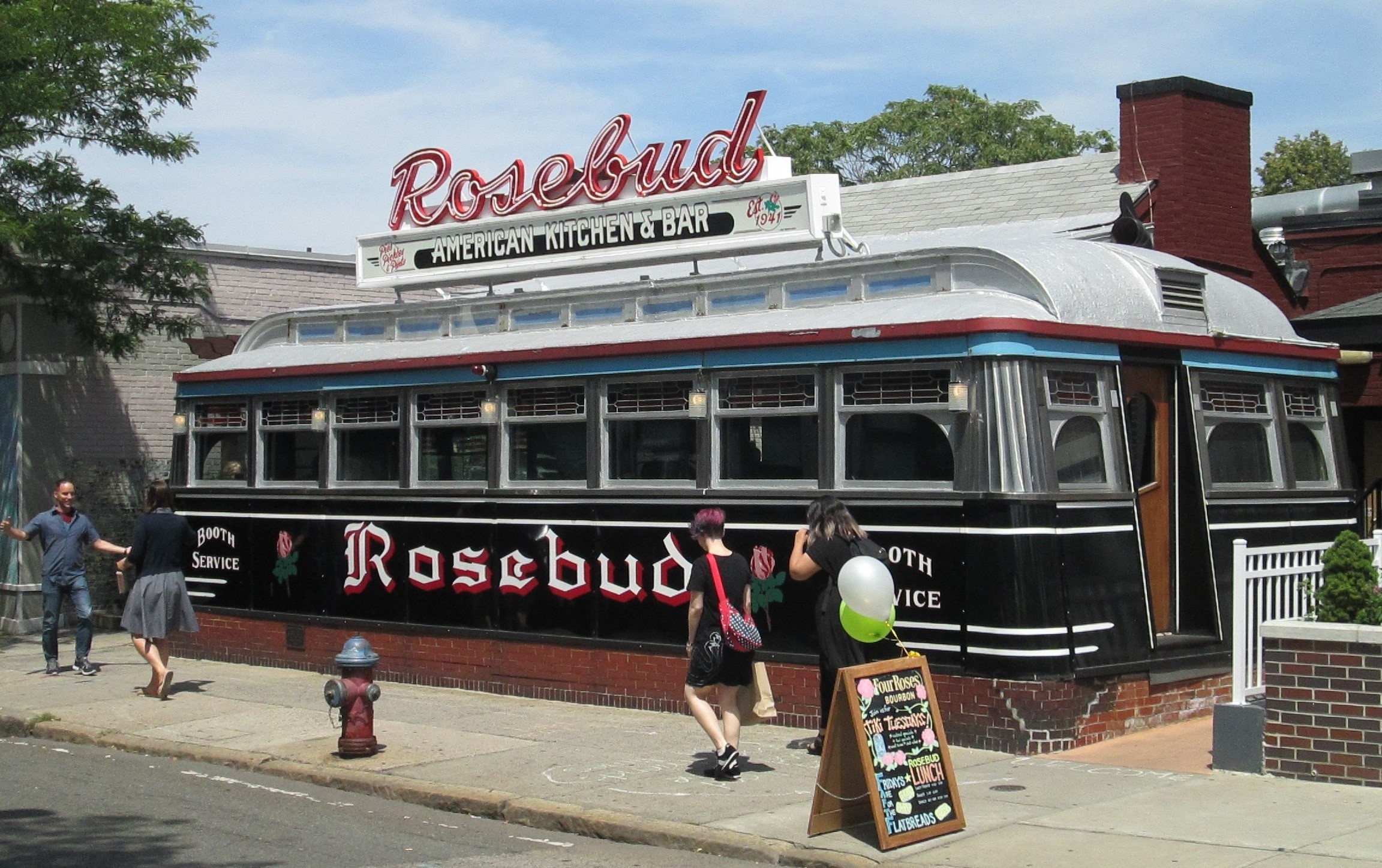
- (2017)

- Location within Massachusetts Location within the United States
- Location: 381 Summer Street; Somerville, Massachusetts
- Coordinates: 42°23′39.80″N 71°7′15.13″W
- Built: 1941
- Architect: Worcester Lunch Car Company
- MPS: Diners of Massachusetts MPS
- NRHP reference No.: 99001125
- Added to NRHP: September 22, 1999

Rosebud is a historic diner building at 381 Summer Street in Somerville, Massachusetts, near Davis Square.

The diner was built in 1941 by the Worcester Lunch Car Company for the Nichols and Perivolaris families. It was added to the National Register of Historic Places in 1999.

The original lunch car was 400 square feet. At some point, an addition of over 3000 square feet was made to the back containing a full kitchen (as opposed to the original small grill area behind the counter) and additional seating.

== Recent history ==
In 2013, after 40 years of Nichols family ownership, Evangelos Nichols sold the Rosebud to Martin Bloom. Bloom, the founder of a chain of Italian restaurants called Vinny Testa's and owner of the Mission Oak Grill, promised to leave the exterior untouched. However, the original interior was completely removed and the business name changed to "Rosebud American Kitchen and Bar", reflecting the shift from a diner-style business model to a mid-tier table service restaurant. The restaurant was operated by the Alpine Restaurants Group, owners of two other restaurants within two blocks of Rosebud, "Posto", a wood-fired pizzeria; and "The Painted Burro", a Mexican restaurant.

Alpine decided to put more focus into their other restaurant concepts, and in June 2023, Rosebud was sold to investor Koushik “Babu” Koganti's Bindas Concepts for $800K. It abruptly closed in late September with staff given less than two weeks' notice, and reopened a few weeks later as the "Rosebud Bar & Kitchen" with some repairs having been made to the building and a menu that included a fusion of Indian influences with American diner food.

== In popular culture ==
In 2019, the diner made an appearance as the "Rose Diner" in an episode of the German TV series Katie Fforde.

The diner's likeness makes a brief appearance at the end of season 2 episode 10 of Japanese animated series Blood Blockade Battlefront.

== See also ==
- National Register of Historic Places listings in Somerville, Massachusetts
