= Rosebud Creek (South Dakota) =

Stream in South Dakota, U.S.

Coordinates: 43°16′03″N 100°53′39″W

Rosebud Creek is a stream in the U.S. state of South Dakota. It takes its name from the nearby Rosebud Indian Reservation.

== See also ==
- List of rivers of South Dakota
