= Rosebud =

Rosebud may refer to:

- Rose bud, the bud of a rose flower

== Arts ==
- The name of Jerry Garcia's guitar from 1979 until his death in 1995
- In the 1941 film Citizen Kane, the last words of Charles Foster Kane and an overall plot device
- "Rosebud" (The Simpsons), an episode of the television comedy The Simpsons, parodying Citizen Kane
- Rosebud (band), a folk-rock band circa 1970, featuring Judy Henske and Jerry Yester
- Rosebud (Fabergé egg)
- Rosebud (1975 film), an American film
- Rosebud (2019 film), a South Korean film
- In the Columbo episode How to Dial a Murder "Rosebud" was used as a special trigger word for dogs to attack.
- The Rosebuds, an indie-rock band
- "Rosebud", a song by Ryan Adams from the album Cold Roses
- "Rosebud", a song by Sparks from their 1986 album Music That You Can Dance To
- "Rosebud" (song), a song by Manic Street Preachers
- Rosebud, a Splicer model in the video game BioShock
- Rosebud the Basselope, a character in the comic strip Bloom County

== Places ==
=== Australia ===
- Rosebud, Victoria, Australia

=== Canada ===
- Rosebud, Alberta, Canada
- Rosebud River, Canada

=== United States ===
- Rosebud Indian Reservation, a Sioux reservation in South Dakota, U.S.
  - Battle of the Rosebud, a battle on June 17, 1876 between the Lakota (Sioux) and Cheyenne Indian tribes and the U.S. and their Indian allies, the Shoshone and Crow tribes
- Rose Bud, Arkansas
- Rosebud, Alabama
- Rosebud, Georgia
- Rosebud, Missouri
- Rosebud, Montana
- Rosebud, North Carolina
- Rosebud, South Dakota
- Rosebud, Texas
- Rosebud County, Montana

== People ==
- Sasha Obama, daughter of U.S. President Barack Obama, by U.S. Secret Service codename
- Mary Ong, money launderer and police informant who used Rosebud as a codename
- Rosebud Denovo (died 1992), street activist killed by police in Berkeley, California, U.S.
- Rosebud the Basselope, a character in the comic strip Bloom County

== Other uses ==
- PZ 87 The Rosebud, the fishing vessel that sailed to London in 1937 to protest the Newlyn Clearances
- The Rosebud (diner), a diner in Somerville, Massachusetts
- Rosebud Formation, a geological unit in Nebraska and South Dakota
- Rosebud (Schooner) that ran aground in Port Phillip Bay
- Rosebud, a euphemism for small buttplug with sparkling jewelry at bottom
- Rose-bud torch, a type of oxy-gas torch; see oxy-fuel welding and cutting
- Rosebud Releasing Corporation, a former American studio company that produced Evil Dead II
