= Malvern Road School =

- U.S. National Register of Historic Places
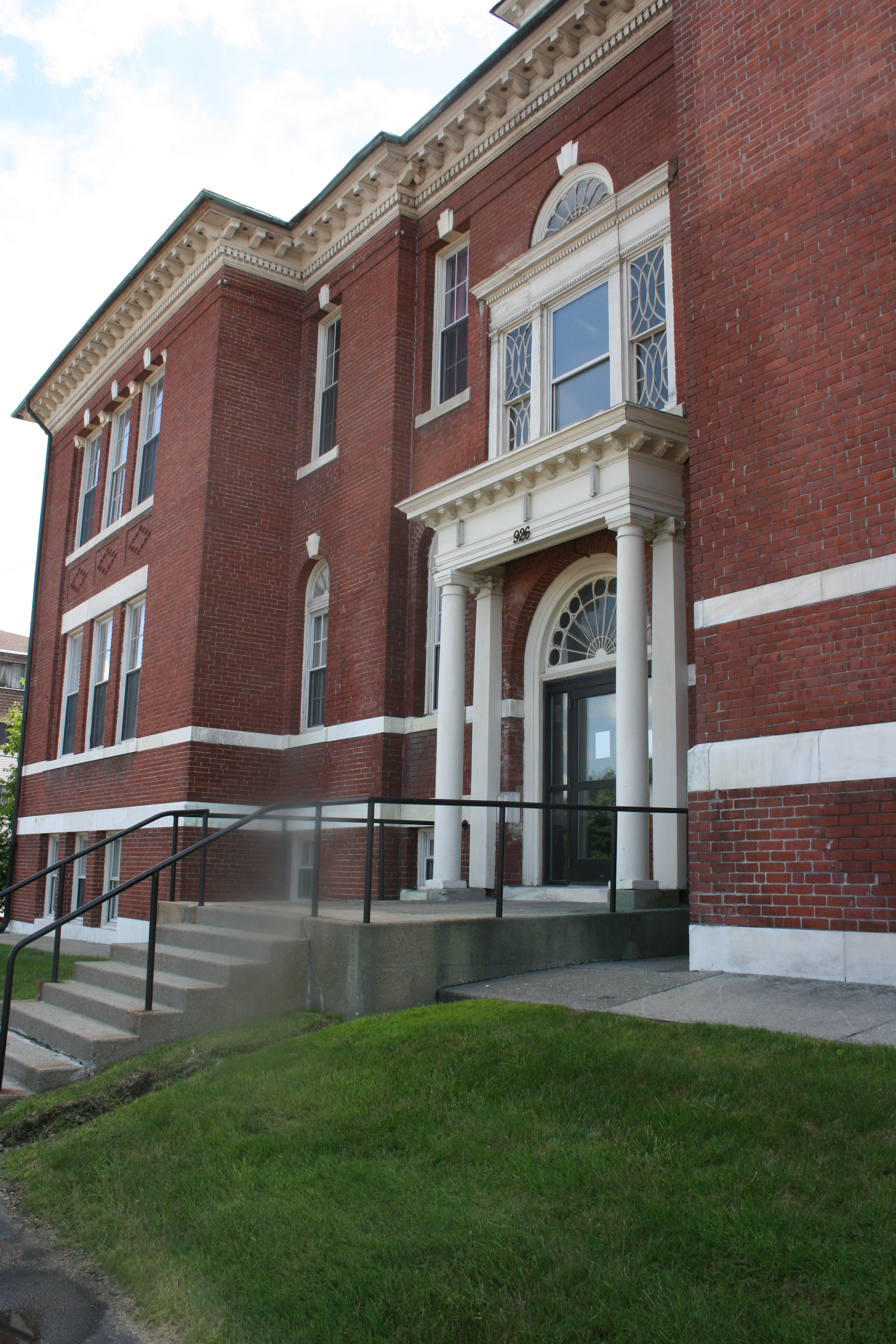

- Location within Massachusetts Location within the United States
- Location: Malvern Rd. and Southbridge St., Worcester, Massachusetts
- Coordinates: 42°14′07″N 71°48′59″W
- Built: 1896
- Architect: Fuller & Delano
- Architectural style: Renaissance
- MPS: Worcester MRA
- NRHP reference No.: 84000096
- Added to NRHP: October 04, 1984

The Malvern Road School is a historic school building on Malvern Road and Southbridge Street in Worcester, Massachusetts. Built in 1896 and enlarged in 1907, it is a high quality example of Beaux Arts and Renaissance Revival architecture. It is also significant as a well-preserved work of the local architectural firm Fuller & Delano. The building was listed on the National Register of Historic Places in 1984. The building has been converted to residential condominiums.

== Description and history ==
The Malvern Road School is set prominently overlooking the junction of Malvern Road and Southbridge in southern Worcester. It is a two-story masonry structure, built out of red brick with wooden and marble trim. Its main facade is symmetrical, with a central section flanked by slightly projecting wings. The entrance is at the center, sheltered by a porch with Ionic columns and entablature. The entrance is topped in the second level by a Palladian window. Marble stringcourses run below and above the basement windows, and at the base of the first floor windows. The main roof cornice projects significantly and is adorned with modillion blocks.

The school was designed by prominent local architects Fuller & Delano, and its western two-thirds, housing two classrooms and offices, were built in 1896. The building was enlarged in 1907 to its present extent (four classrooms), in a scheme of planned enlargement used in other Worcester school designs of the period. The school was one of ten schools built in the city in 1896-97, and was located in an area that was at the time relatively sparsely developed. The building now houses condominium residences.

== See also ==
- National Register of Historic Places listings in eastern Worcester, Massachusetts
