= Charles Magnuson Three-Decker =

- U.S. National Register of Historic Places
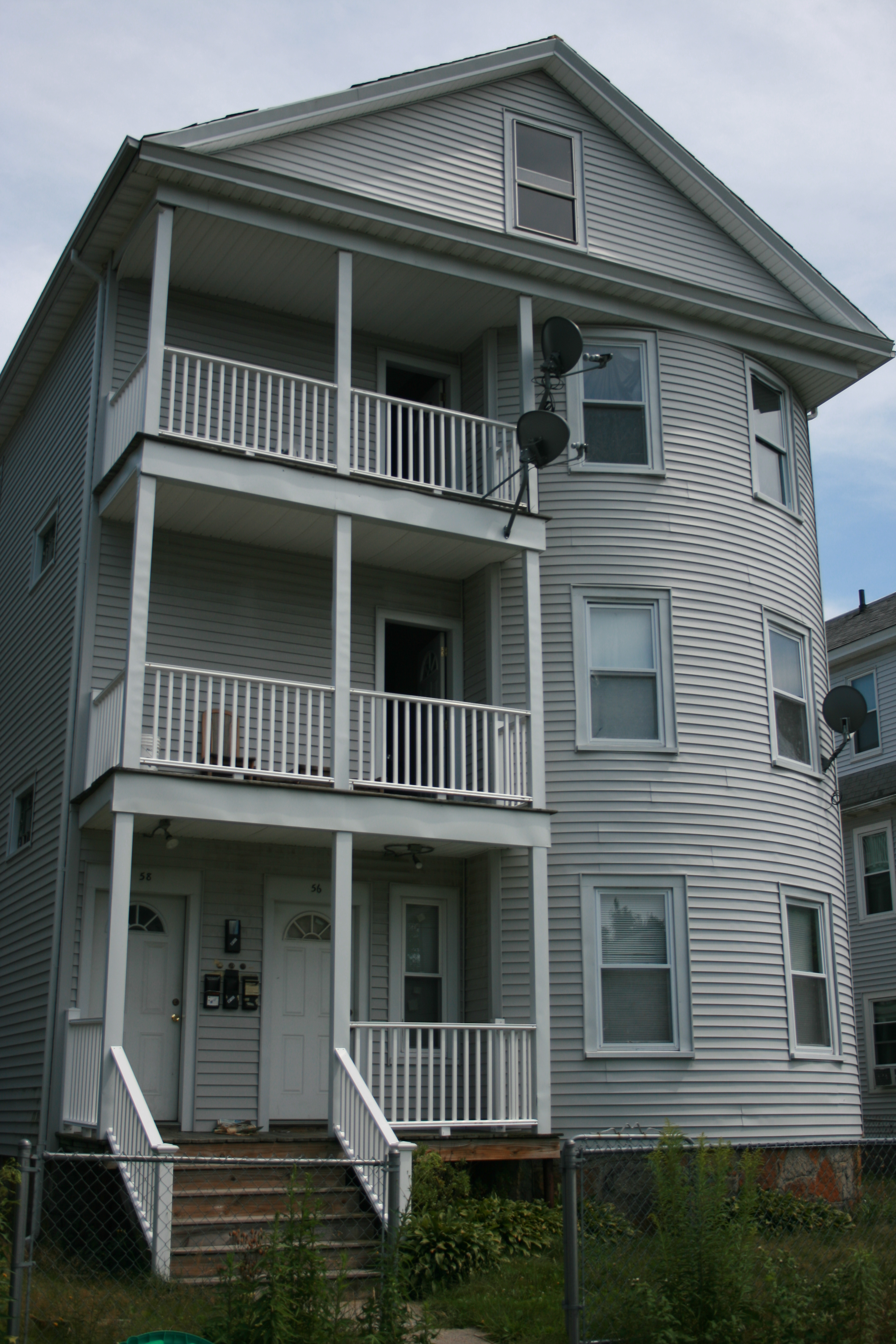

- Location within Massachusetts Location within the United States
- Location: 56–58 Olga Ave., Worcester, Massachusetts
- Coordinates: 42°16′27″N 71°47′3″W
- Area: less than one acre
- Built: c. 1912
- Architectural style: Colonial Revival
- MPS: Worcester Three-Deckers TR
- NRHP reference No.: 89002434
- Added to NRHP: February 9, 1990

The Charles Magnuson Three-Decker is a historic triple decker in Worcester, Massachusetts. Built about 1912, it is a good example of a Colonial Revival triple decker, built during a local housing construction boom. The house was listed on the National Register of Historic Places in 1990.

== Description and history ==
The Charles Magnuson Three-Decker is located in Worcester's eastern Belmont Street neighborhood, on the east side of Olga Street near its northern end. It is three stories in height, with a gabled roof and exterior finished in modern siding. The asymmetrical main facade has a three-tier porch on the right, supported by square posts, and a rounded projecting window bay on the left, which has two sash windows on each level. The gable end is fully pedimented; the roof cornice once had brackets, but these have been lost. Other lost feature included rounded posts on the porches, and the use of wooden shingles in the bands between the windows of the rounded bay. A polygonal window bay projects from one side.

The house was built c. 1912, late in the triple-decker housing boom on Belmont Hill. Most of the housing in this area was built for mainly Swedish and Finnish immigrants working in Worcester's northern steel and wire factories. Charles Magnuson, the first owner, was a foreman in a metal goods plant. Early tenants included a machinist, cabinetmaker and bookkeeper.

== See also ==
- National Register of Historic Places listings in eastern Worcester, Massachusetts
