= George Gale House (Worcester, Massachusetts) =

Historic house in Massachusetts, United States

- U.S. National Register of Historic Places
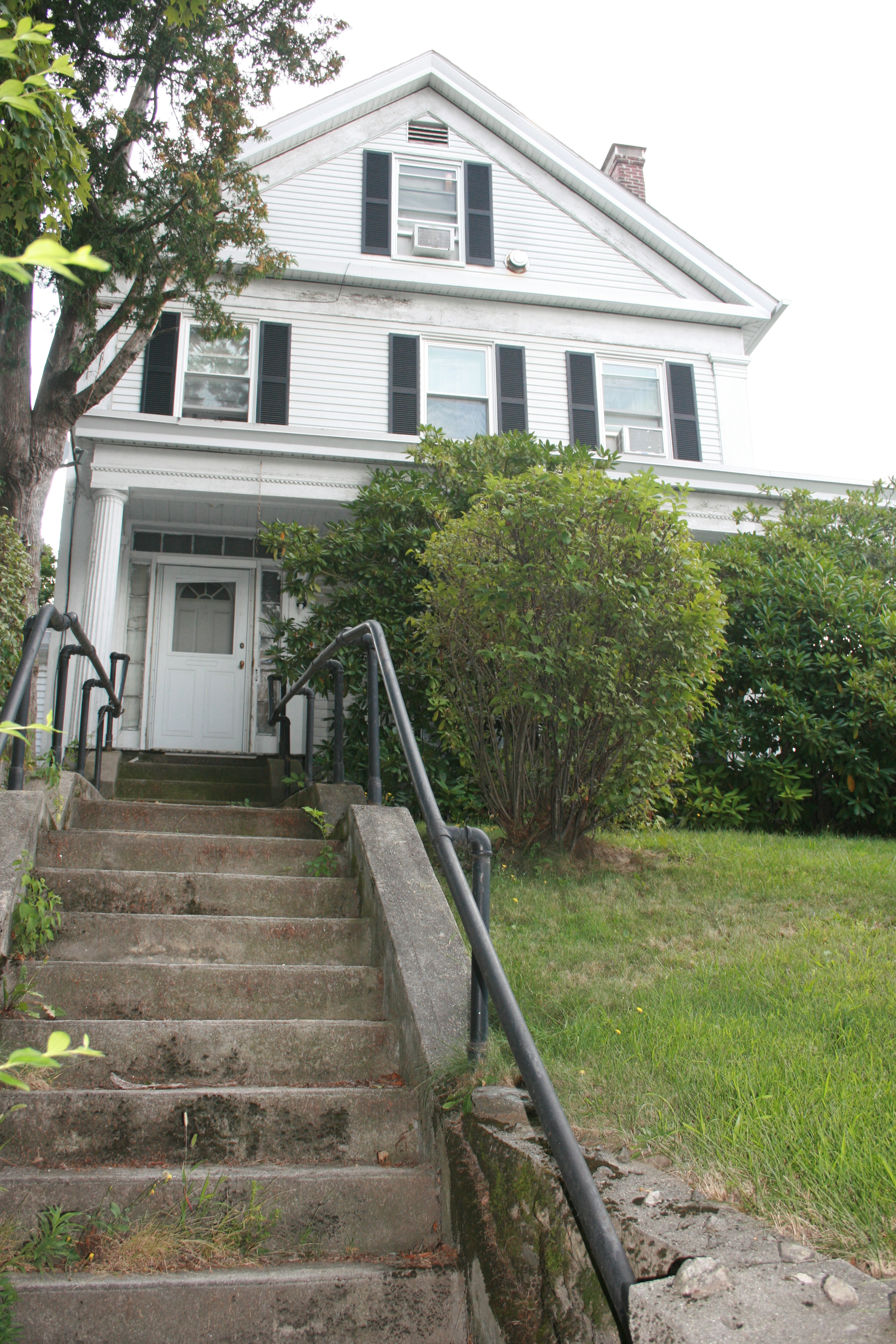

- Location within Massachusetts Location within the United States
- Location: 15 Elizabeth St., Worcester, Massachusetts
- Coordinates: 42°16′15″N 71°47′27″W
- Area: less than one acre
- Built: 1848
- Architectural style: Greek Revival
- MPS: Worcester MRA
- NRHP reference No.: 80000561
- Added to NRHP: March 05, 1980

The George Gale House is a historic house at 15 Elizabeth Street in Worcester, Massachusetts. Built in 1848–49, it is an excellent example of a modest side-hall plan Greek Revival house, a once-common house type of the city's early residential areas. The house was listed on the National Register of Historic Places in 1980.

== Description and history ==
The George Gale House is located in a predominantly residential area of Chandler Hill east of downtown Worcester, at the northeast corner of Elizabeth and Farwell Streets. It is a 2 1/2-story wood-frame structure, with a gabled roof and clapboarded exterior. The house has a single-story porch wrapping around two sides, supported by fluted round Doric columns. Windows sheltered by the porch are longer than normal, a typical Greek Revival feature. The building corners have pilasters, which rise to an entablature that encircles the building. The main gable end is fully pedimented, with a sash window at its center. The interior of the house follows a side hall plan.

The house was built 1848–49 by Joel Flagg, who occupied until his death in 1854. These types of houses were once common in the Chandler Hill area, which was developed as an early residential suburb of downtown Worcester; this is one of a small number of houses left in the neighborhood which date to that period. The house was bought in 1859 by George Gale, a paper manufacturer, who lived here for most of the later 19th century.

== See also ==
- National Register of Historic Places listings in eastern Worcester, Massachusetts
