= Addison Prentiss House =

Historic house in Massachusetts, United States

- U.S. National Register of Historic Places
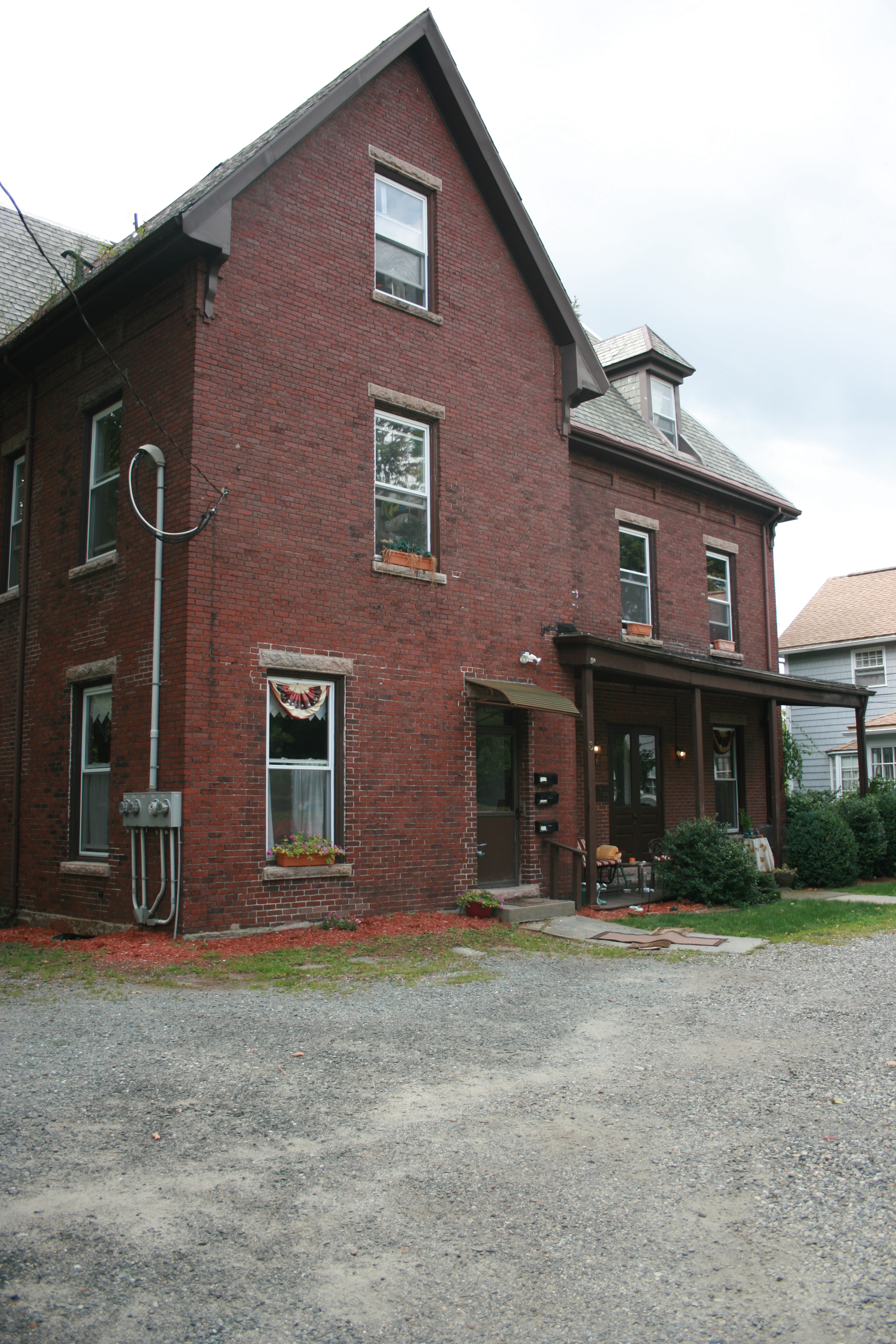

- Location within Massachusetts Location within the United States
- Location: 3 Channing Way, Worcester, Massachusetts
- Coordinates: 42°16′26″N 71°47′36″W
- Area: less than one acre
- Built: c. 1877
- Architectural style: Gothic
- MPS: Worcester MRA
- NRHP reference No.: 80000558
- Added to NRHP: March 5, 1980

The Addison Prentiss House is a historic house in Worcester, Massachusetts. The house was built c. 1877, and is one of the city's finer Gothic Revival houses built in brick. It was listed on the National Register of Historic Places in 1980.

== Description and history ==
The Addison Prentiss House is located east of downtown Worcester, at the end of Channing Way, a stub street off Channing Street in the city's Bell Hill neighborhood. It is a 2 1/2-story brick building with an L-shaped configuration and gabled roof. It is oriented facing south toward Kendall Street. The main facade is dominated by a 3 1/2-story tower, and a porch that extends across the full width of the front. Other elevations are asymmetrical, with varying gables and porches. Windows are generally set in rectangular openings, with rustically cut granite sills and lintels. A wood frame porch extends across the northern facade, which appears to have served as the building's principal entry.

Addison Prentiss, the first owner, was a printer, book dealer, and publisher. He came to the city about 1852, and is known for publishing one of the first bird's-eye views of the city in 1851. Charles Hanson, the next owner, is believed to be the city's first Swedish immigrant; he was a piano tuner who eventually opened a music shop downtown. Hanson was also active in civic affairs and organizations that aided further Swedish settlement.

== See also ==
- National Register of Historic Places listings in eastern Worcester, Massachusetts
