= Morris Levenson Three-Decker =

- U.S. National Register of Historic Places
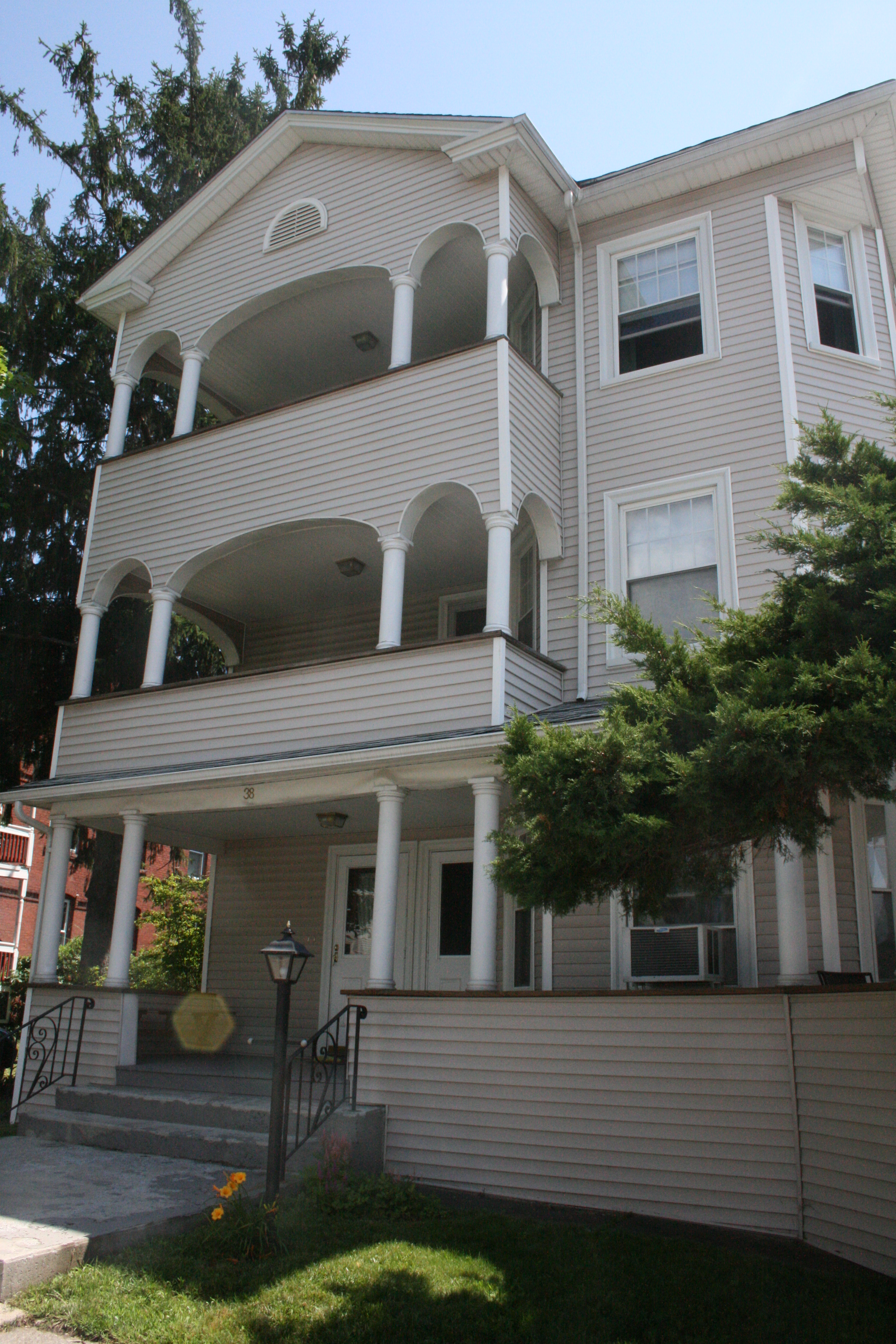

- Location within Massachusetts Location within the United States
- Location: 38 Plantation St., Worcester, Massachusetts
- Coordinates: 42°15′12″N 71°46′56″W
- Area: less than one acre
- Built: c. 1920
- Architectural style: Colonial Revival
- MPS: Worcester Three-Deckers TR
- NRHP reference No.: 89002446
- Added to NRHP: February 9, 1990

The Morris Levenson Three-Decker is a historic triple decker in Worcester, Massachusetts. The house was built c. 1920, and is an excellent local example of Colonial Revival style. It was listed on the National Register of Historic Places in 1990.

== Description and history ==
The Morris Levenson Three-Decker is located in a residential area in southeastern Worcester, on the east side of Plantation Street. It is a three-story wood-frame structure, with a hipped roof and synthetically sided exterior. Its main facade is asymmetrical, with a three-story porch stack on the left and polygonal window bay on the right. Its porches are supported by multiple slender columns, which are spaced to form arches of varying dimensions on the upper floors. The ground-floor porch extends across the full front, and beyond it to the right to an octagonal pavilion. Other details present when the house was listed on the National Register of Historic Places in 1990, including modillion blocks in the eaves and balustraded porch fronts, have been obscured or lost due to the application of siding (see photo).

The house was built in about 1920, a period when residential three-decker development was being pushed further east from the city center. The building's first documented owner was Morris Levenson, a clothing merchant, and the second, Felix Shimkus, was a chef.

== See also ==
- National Register of Historic Places listings in eastern Worcester, Massachusetts
