= Philip Duke Three-Decker =

- U.S. National Register of Historic Places
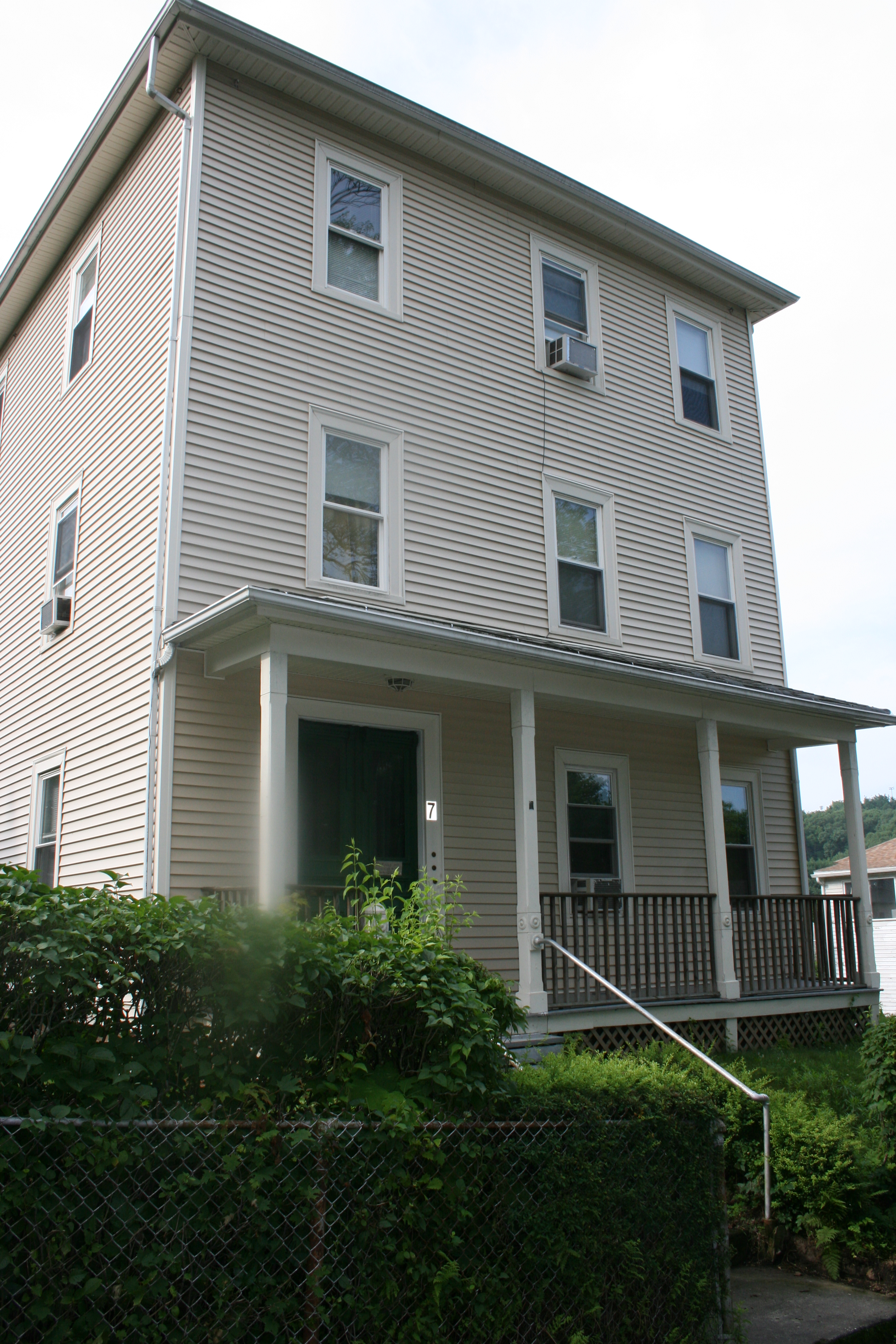

- Location within Massachusetts Location within the United States
- Location: 7 Maxwell St., Worcester, Massachusetts
- Coordinates: 42°14′25″N 71°47′59″W
- Area: less than one acre
- Built: c. 1888
- Architectural style: Italianate
- MPS: Worcester Three-Deckers TR
- NRHP reference No.: 89002425
- Added to NRHP: February 9, 1990

The Philip Duke Three-Decker is a historic triple decker house in Worcester, Massachusetts. Built c. 1888, the house is an early representative of triple-decker development in the Vernon Hill area of southern Worcester. It was listed on the National Register of Historic Places in 1990, but has lost some of the architectural elements important to its listing since then.

== Description and history ==
The Philip Duke Three-Decker stands in the southern Worcester residential area called Vernon Hill, on the east side of Maxwell Street at its junction with Maxwell Court. It is a three-story wood-frame structure, with a hip roof and exterior finished in synthetic siding. A single-story porch extends across its three-bay front facade, supported by square posts. At the time of its National Register listing, it was more elaborately finished, with Italianate brackets in the eaves, turned porch posts with brackets at the top, and rope moulding on the window headers of the front facade. These have been lost or obscured by subsequent exterior residing (see photo).

The house was built about 1888, a relatively early date in the development of triple deckers as features of residential development in southern Worcester. Almost all of the early residents of the building were laborers who were likely employed in the steel plants and factories of southern Worcester. This trend continued into the mid-20th century, although the city's 1930 census lists one resident as a chauffeur.

== See also ==
- National Register of Historic Places listings in eastern Worcester, Massachusetts
