= Henry Bousquet Three-Decker =

- U.S. National Register of Historic Places
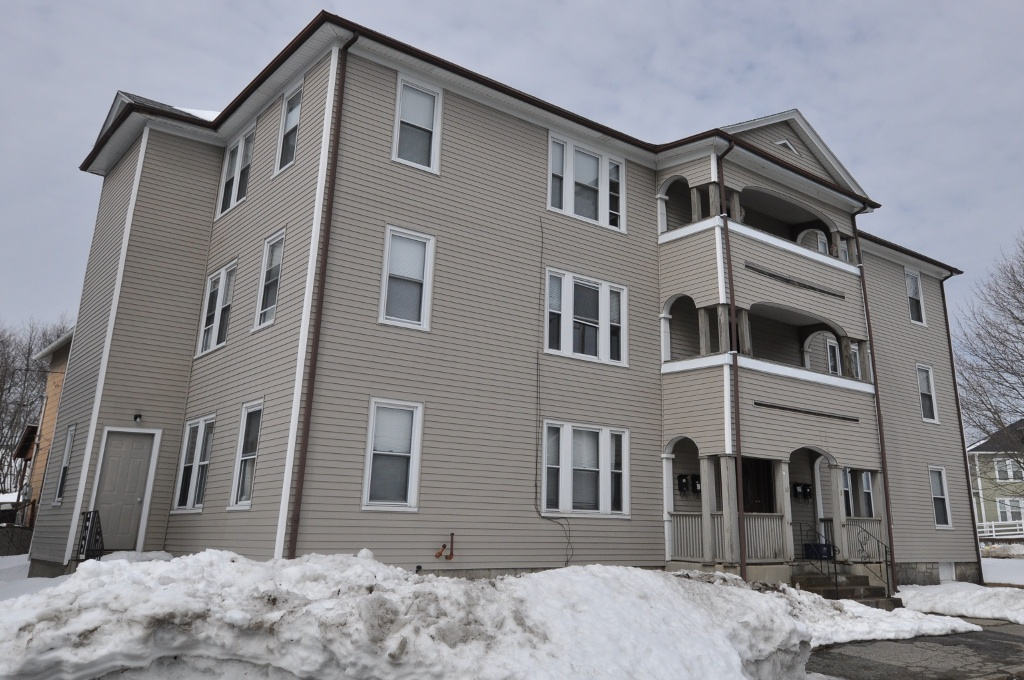

- Location within Massachusetts Location within the United States
- Location: 8–10 Fairmont Ave., Worcester, Massachusetts
- Coordinates: 42°15′38″N 71°46′50″W
- Area: less than one acre
- Built: c. 1928
- Architect: Henry Bousquet
- Architectural style: Colonial Revival
- MPS: Worcester Three-Deckers TR
- NRHP reference No.: 89002360
- Added to NRHP: February 9, 1990

The Henry Bousquet Three-Decker is a historic triple decker in Worcester, Massachusetts, United States. Built circa 1928, it is an uncommon survivor of the late period of triple decker construction, and is also rare as a "double" triple decker with six units. It was listed on the National Register of Historic Places in 1990.

== Description and history ==
The Henry Bousquet Three-Decker stands in Worcester's eastern Franklin Plantation neighborhood, on the west side of Fairmont Avenue near its junction with Plantation Street. It is a three-story wood frame structure, with a hip roof and an artificially sided exterior. The main facade is five bays wide, with symmetrically arranged picture and sash windows on either side of a three-story stack of porches. Despite the recent application of siding, some of the building's Colonial Revival features have been retained. These features include the triangular vent in the gable over the porches, and the arched porch openings.

The building was built about 1928, a relatively late date for the construction of triple deckers. It is an unusual example of the form in the city, for its six-unit configuration, and for its Colonial Revival features. It was probably built by Henry Bousquet, a carpenter who was its first documented owner. Early tenants of the building were mainly working class laborers, who took streetcars (and later automobiles) to reach jobs in the city's industrial facilities. The neighborhood in which it stands was mostly developed in the 1910s and early 1920s.

== See also ==
- National Register of Historic Places listings in eastern Worcester, Massachusetts
