= Greendale Village Improvement Society Building =

- U.S. National Register of Historic Places
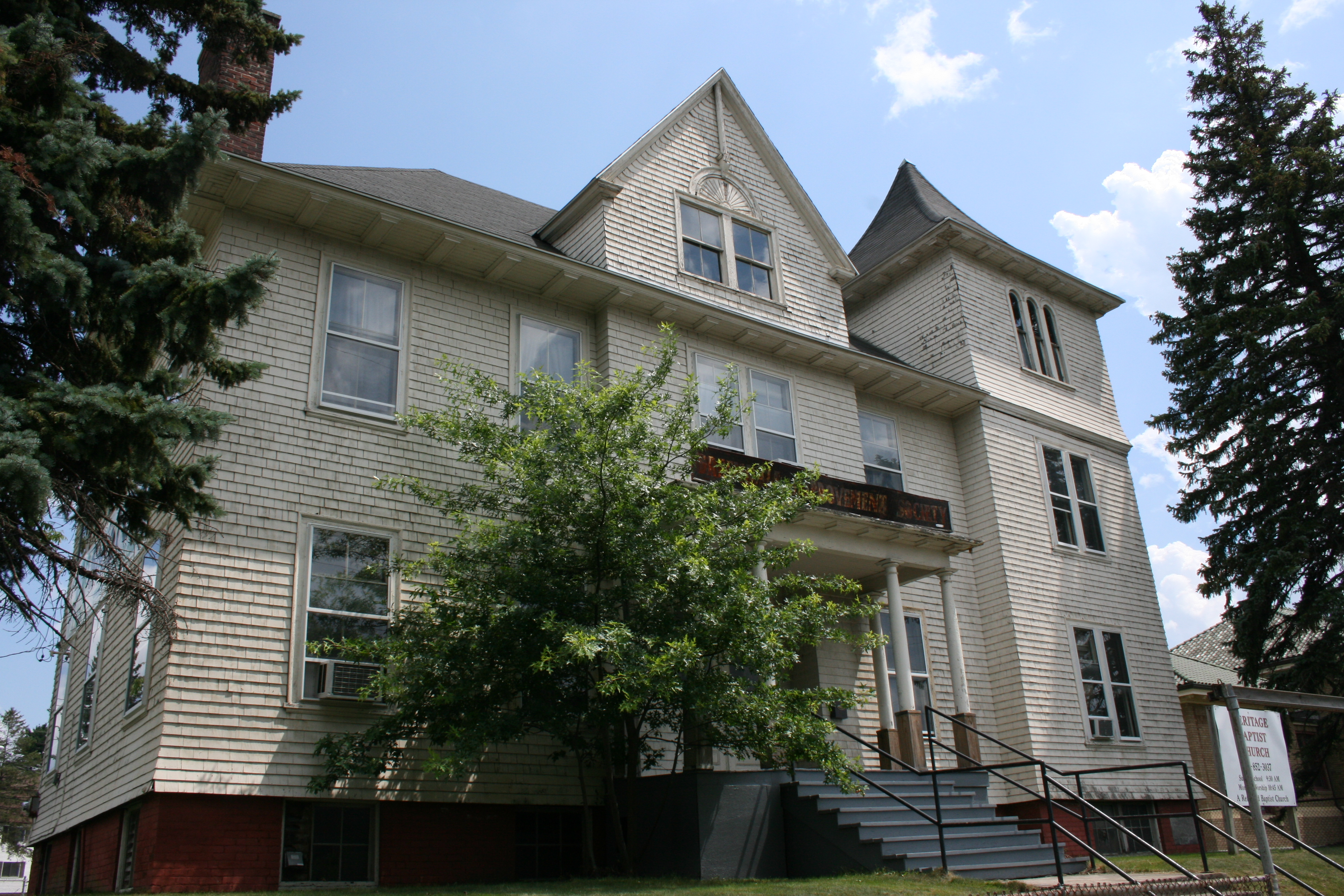

- Location within Massachusetts Location within the United States
- Location: 480 W. Boylston St., Worcester, Massachusetts
- Coordinates: 42°18′27″N 71°47′59″W
- Area: less than one acre
- Built: 1897
- MPS: Worcester MRA
- NRHP reference No.: 76000949
- Added to NRHP: November 07, 1976

The Greendale Village Improvement Society Building is a historic building at 480 W. Boylston Street in Worcester, Massachusetts. Built in 1897, it is an important reminder of the role community organizations played in making civic improvements in the late 19th and early 20th centuries. It was listed on the National Register of Historic Places in 1976.

== Description and history ==
The Greendale Village Improvement Society Building stands on the east side of West Boylston Street in northeastern Worcester, between Airlie Street to the north and the Frances Perkins Branch Library. It is a 2-1/2 story wood frame structure, with a hip roof and clapboarded exterior. A three-story square tower rises to a flared pyramidal roof at its southwestern corner, and a large gable is set above the central bay of the west-facing front facade. At the center of that gable are a pair of sash windows, with a half-round fan above. The bay below the gable also projects slightly, with an entrance porch projecting further. The interior of the building is laid out with a kitchen and dining room in the basement, a small meeting space and library on the ground floor, and a large meeting hall on the second floor.

The Greendale Improvement Society was founded in 1895 as a community vehicle to improve conditions in Worcester's Greendale neighborhood. In 1897, it was rechartered as the Greendale Village Improvement Society, and was given land by the Kendrick family on which to build a meeting house. The society raised funds and had this building erected in 1900. The society was a significant presence in the local community, building, maintaining, and plowing roads in the community in its early years, lobbying the city for fire protection, and providing for trash removal. After the Second World War, the building was used to house veterans organizations.

== See also ==
- National Register of Historic Places listings in eastern Worcester, Massachusetts
