= Millbury Street Head Start =

- Ward Street School-Millbury Street Schoolhouse #4
- U.S. National Register of Historic Places
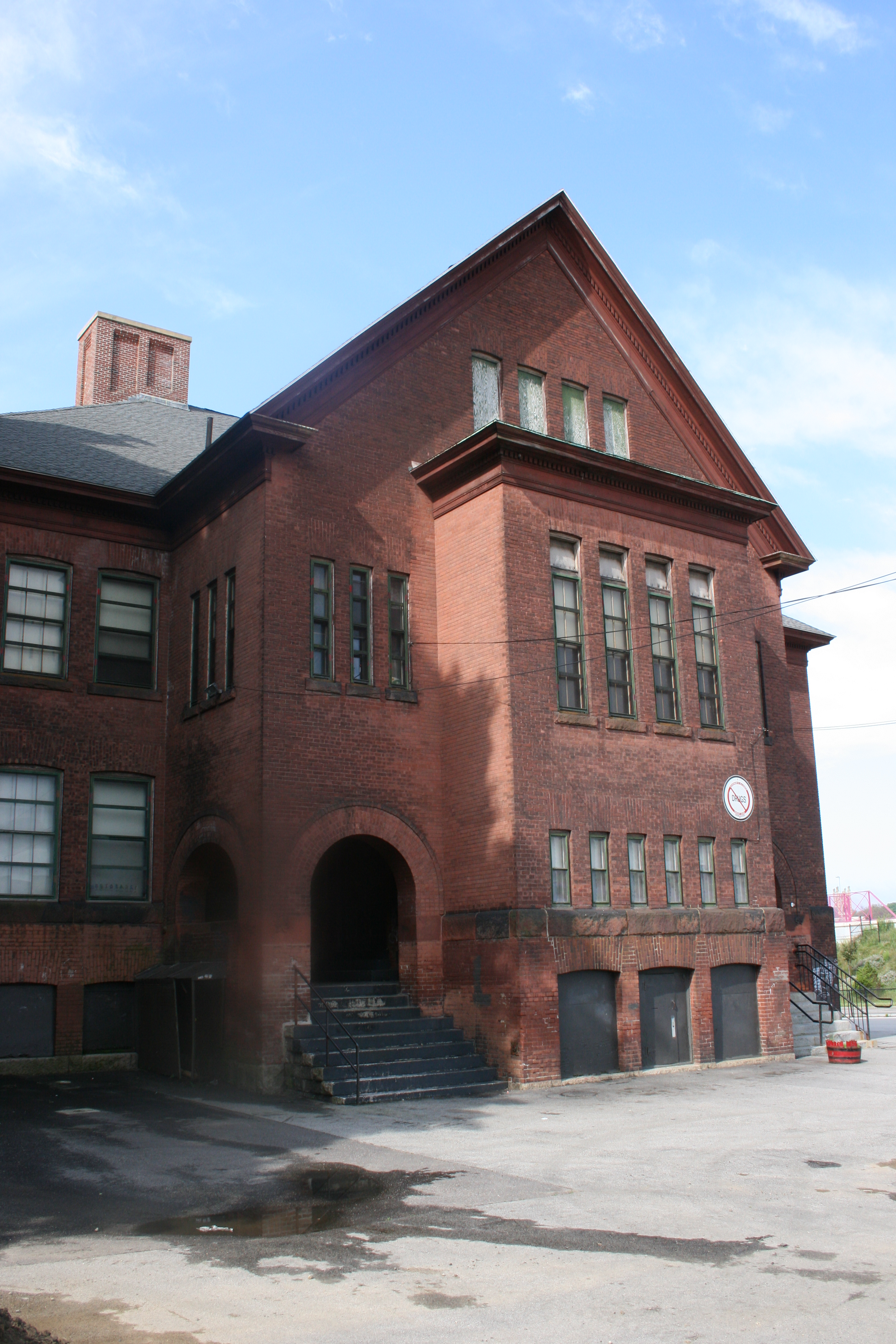

- Location within Massachusetts Location within the United States
- Location: 389 Millbury St., Worcester, Massachusetts
- Coordinates: 42°14′43″N 71°48′6″W
- Area: less than one acre
- Built: 1898
- Architect: J.W. Patston
- Architectural style: Romanesque
- MPS: Worcester MRA
- NRHP reference No.: 80000488
- Added to NRHP: March 5, 1980

The Millbury Street Head Start is a historic school building at 389 Millbury Street in Worcester, Massachusetts. The building, a Romanesque brick structure built in 1898-99, was originally called Millbury Street Schoolhouse #4 and was later known as the Ward Street School. Designed by J.W. Patston, it was listed on the National Register of Historic Places in 1980. It now houses Head Start programs run under the auspices of the Worcester Public Schools.

== Description and history ==
The Millbury Street School is located southeast of downtown Worcester, on the east side of Millbury Street at Harlem Street in the Vernon Hill neighborhood. It is a 2-1/2 story brick building, built out of red brick and covered by a hipped roof. The roof has wide side dormers, and a central projecting gable-ended section projects to the north (toward Harlem Street). At either end of the projecting section, rounded archways shelter recessed entrances. The building foundation is rock-faced granite, and it has sandstone trim elements.

The building was designed by J. W. Patston and was built in 1898-99. It is the last of four similar schools to be built at the time in the city, and is the least altered of those that survive. At the time of its construction, the parcel on which it was built had three other schools on it, all of which were subsequently demolished by encroaching residential and highway development (the building is just east of Interstate 290.

== See also ==
- National Register of Historic Places listings in eastern Worcester, Massachusetts
