= Charles Miles House =

Historic house in Massachusetts, United States

- U.S. National Register of Historic Places
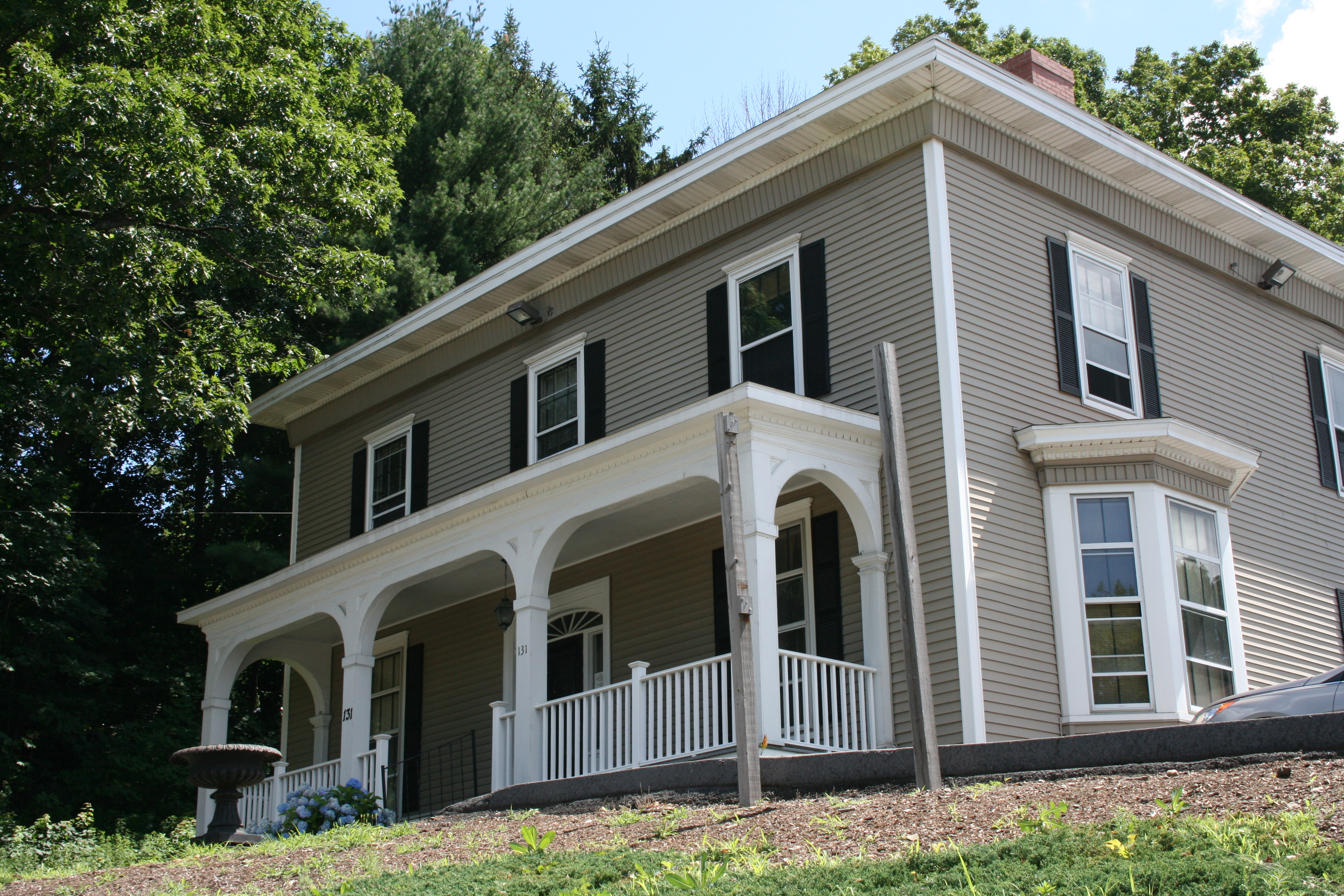

- Location within Massachusetts Location within the United States
- Location: 131 Lincoln St., Worcester, Massachusetts
- Coordinates: 42°16′41″N 71°47′39″W
- Area: less than one acre
- Built: c. 1850
- Architectural style: Italianate
- MPS: Worcester MRA
- NRHP reference No.: 80000527
- Added to NRHP: March 05, 1980

The Charles Miles House is a historic house at 131 Lincoln Street in Worcester, Massachusetts. Built about 1850, it was one of the city's finest surviving Italianate residences when it was listed on the National Register of Historic Places in 1980. Many of its exterior features have been lost due to the application of modern siding (see photo).

== Description and history ==
The Charles Miles House is located in Worcester's northeastern Brittan Square neighborhood, on the east side of Lincoln Street (Massachusetts Route 70) at its corner with Forestdale Road. It is a two-story wood-frame house, three bays wide, with a hip roof and modern siding. A single-story hip-roofed porch extends across its front façade, with square posts rising to arched openings. The porch roof eave is lined with dentil molding, a detail repeated in a projecting polygonal window bay on the right side.

When listed on the National Register, the building was described as one of Worcester's finest Italianate residences, with corner quoining, a modillioned cornice, and a widow's walk. Windows were capped by lintels set on consoles. All of these features have since been lost to exterior alteration.

The house was built c. 1850 by Charles Miles, a clerk working the city's treasury department. The house was occupied by Dr. Thomas P Coyle from June 16, 1960, until August 1983, who restored much of the first floor interior.

Since 2017 The Charles Miles House has been owed by 131 Lincoln Street, LLC, and has been converted to professional office space. The main tenant of the building is Kovacs Law, P.C.

== See also ==
- National Register of Historic Places listings in eastern Worcester, Massachusetts
