= Fay Street Historic District =

Historic district in Massachusetts, United States

- U.S. National Register of Historic Places
- U.S. Historic district
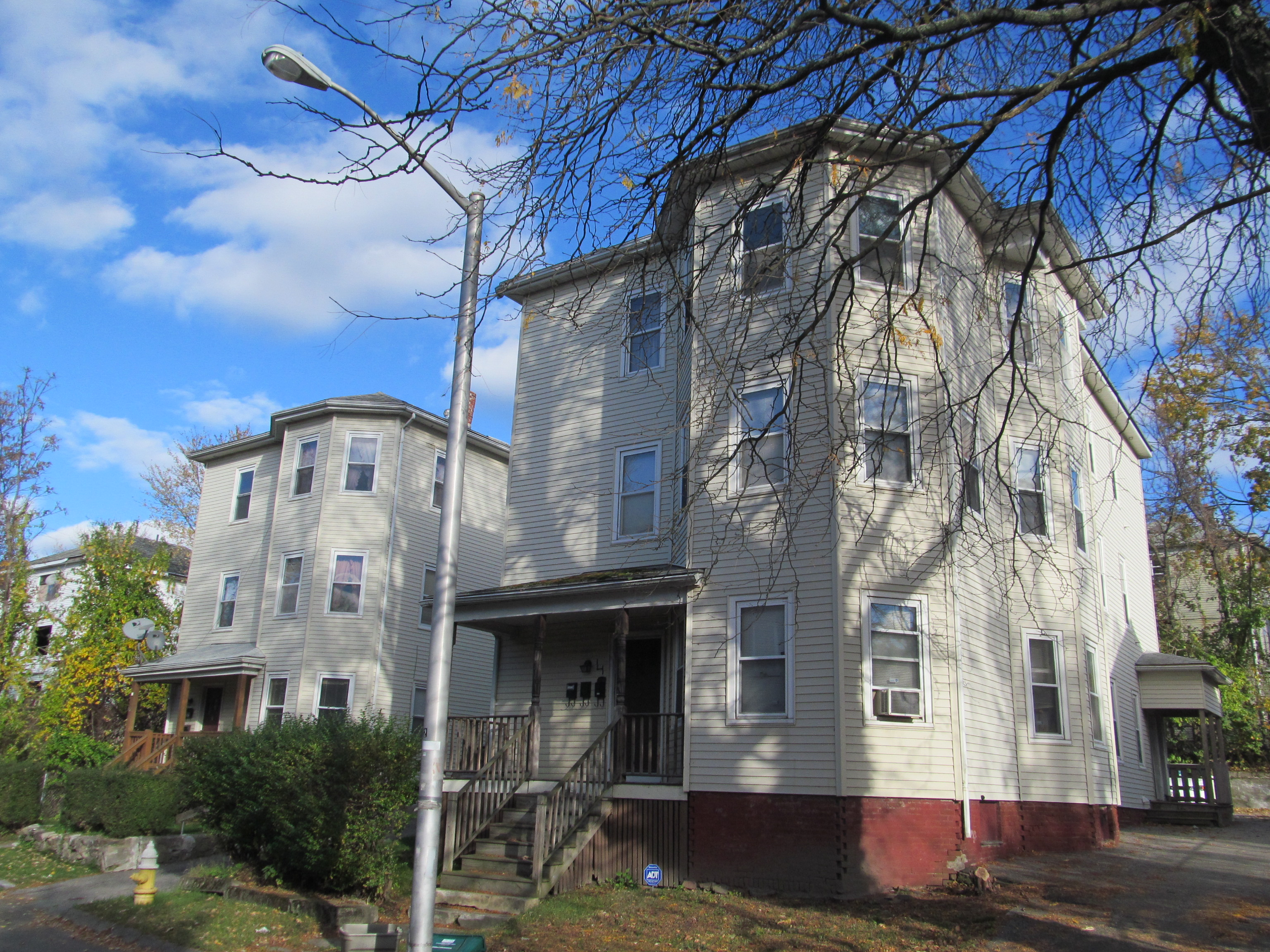
- 4 and 6 Fay Street

- Location within Massachusetts Location within the United States
- Location: 4–6 Fay St., Worcester, Massachusetts
- Coordinates: 42°15′25″N 71°47′16″W
- Area: less than one acre
- Built: 1896
- Architectural style: Queen Anne
- MPS: Worcester Three-Deckers TR
- NRHP reference No.: 89002372
- Added to NRHP: February 9, 1990

The Fay Street Historic District a small residential historic district encompassing two related triple decker houses in Worcester, Massachusetts. Built about 1896, they were noted for the preservation of their Queen Anne styling, which has since been removed. They were listed on the National Register of Historic Places in 1990.

== Description and history ==
Fay Street is located southeast of downtown Worcester; it is a short dead-end residential street on the north side of Grafton Street west of its junction with Hamilton Street. Numbers 4 and 6 stand side by side at the far end of the street, on the east side. They are nearly identical in their construction: both are three stories in height, with a hip roof. They have asymmetrical facades, with a three-story projecting polygonal window bay on the right, and a single-story porch on the left. There is a second projecting window bay about midway down the long right side of each one, and a porch at the back of that side.

When the district was listed on the National Register of Historic Places in 1990, the two triple deckers, built c. 1896, were noted for the preservation of their Queen Anne styling, including porches with turned balusters and brackets, with similar decorative bracketing in the roof eaves. 4 Fay Street was also noted for having decorative pendants hanging from the roof line near the side projection. Since then, the buildings have been resided and their porches rebuilt with simpler styling (see photo).

== See also ==
- National Register of Historic Places listings in eastern Worcester, Massachusetts
