= Houghton Street Historic District =

Historic district in Massachusetts, United States

- U.S. National Register of Historic Places
- U.S. Historic district
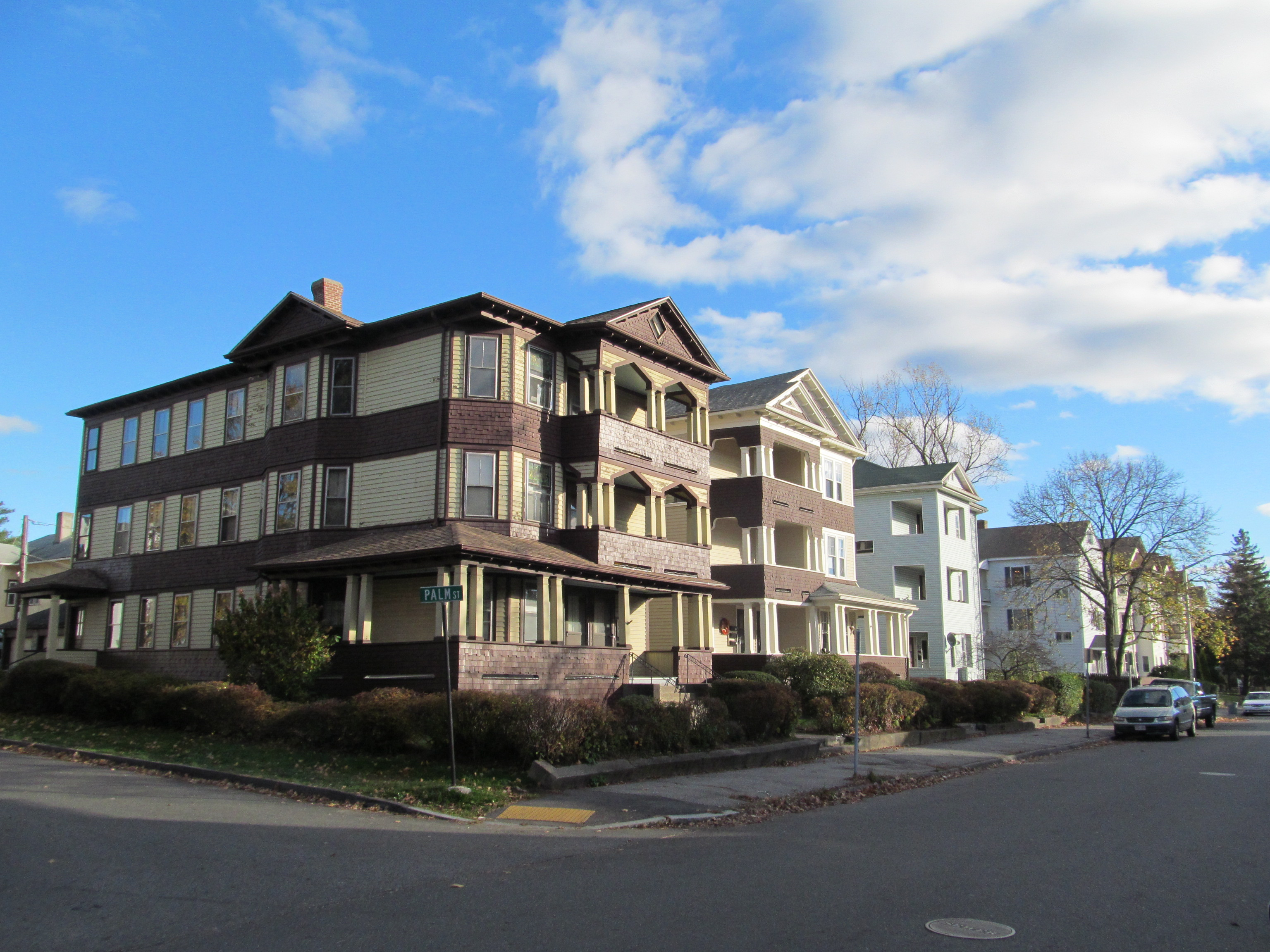
- Corner of Palm and Houghton

- Location within Massachusetts Location within the United States
- Location: Houghton St. between Palm and Dorchester Sts., Worcester, Massachusetts
- Coordinates: 42°15′10″N 71°47′8″W
- Area: 1.13 acres (0.46 ha)
- Architectural style: Colonial Revival
- MPS: Worcester Three-Deckers TR
- NRHP reference No.: 89002371
- Added to NRHP: February 9, 1990

The Houghton Street Historic District is a historic district in Worcester, Massachusetts. It consists of seven triple-decker residences (six on the odd-numbered side of Houghton Street and one on Dorchester Street) and three period garages, all built between 1920 and 1926. The buildings represent a well-preserved and cohesive collection of Colonial Revival residences. The district was listed on the National Register of Historic Places in 1990. Some of the buildings have lost historic integrity since the listing.

== Description and history ==
Houghton Street is a north–south street in Worcester's southeastern Oak Hill area, and is basically residential in character. This historic district encompasses one side of a single city block, the east side of the street between Palm and Dorchester Streets. Located on this block are seven triple decker houses, six of them facing Houghton Street, and the southernmost one facing Dorcester Street. All were built between 1920 and 1926, a period when triple-decker construction had pushed west from its earliest concentrations on the west side of Grafton Hill. The area was populated by a mix of blue- and white-collar lower- and middle-class residents, who were ethnically diverse. The first houses to be built were 61, 63 and 65 Houghton Street, which were followed by 147 Dorchester Street, and lastly by 49, 53, and 57 Houghton.

The northernmost house, 49 Houghton, has a hip roof and a typical asymmetrical facade, with a polygonal projecting bay on the left side, and a stack of porches on the right, with the first-floor porch wrapping around the left side. The porch columns are grouped square columns, and the front-facing porch openings have peaked shape. The porch stack is topped by a fully pedimented gable with a diamond window at the center.

The adjacent house, 53 Houghton, has porches on the left of the facade and bands of tripled sash windows on the right. The porches are once again supported by grouped square columns, and are capped by a gabled pediment that matches the main roof gable in having a triangular louver at its center. 57 Houghton also has tripled windows instead of a bay, and had porches supported by Tuscan columns, but they have since been rebuilt and the house resided with modern siding.

The last three houses on Houghton Street have all been compromised by the application of modern siding, and the enclosure of their front porches. 147 Dorchester Street is unusual in having a mostly symmetrical facade, with polygonal bays flanking a central porch stack which is topped by a modillioned and pedimented gable. The porch is supported by fluted square columns, with modillioned overhangs.

== See also ==
- National Register of Historic Places listings in eastern Worcester, Massachusetts
