= National Register of Historic Places listings in eastern Worcester, Massachusetts =

There are 98 properties and historic districts on the National Register of Historic Places in Worcester, Massachusetts, east of I-190 and the north-south section of I-290, which are listed below. Two listings overlap into other parts of Worcester: one of the 1767 Milestones is located in northwestern Worcester, and the Blackstone Canal Historic District traverses all three sections of the city.

The locations of National Register properties and districts (at least for all showing latitude and longitude coordinates below) may be seen in an online map by clicking on "Map of all coordinates".

This National Park Service list is complete through NPS recent listings posted March 20, 2026.

== Current listings ==
	Name on the Register	Image	Date listed	Location	Description
1	1767 Milestones	1767 Milestones	April 7, 1971 (#71000084)	Various locations between Springfield and Boston; 42°16′41″N 71°47′40″W	Milestone 47 is in eastern Worcester; Milestone 48 is in northwestern Worcester.
2	Arad Alexander House	Arad Alexander House	March 5, 1980 (#80000544)	53 Waverly St. 42°15′24″N 71°47′33″W	
3	Ludwig Anderson Three-Decker	Ludwig Anderson Three-Decker	February 9, 1990 (#89002355)	4 Fairbanks St. 42°14′41″N 71°47′42″W	
4	Peter Baker Three-Decker	Peter Baker Three-Decker	February 9, 1990 (#89002445)	90 Vernon St. 42°14′54″N 71°47′42″W	
5	Richard Barker Octagon House	Richard Barker Octagon House	March 5, 1980 (#80000592)	312 Plantation St. 42°16′11″N 71°46′16″W	
6	George Bentley House	George Bentley House	March 5, 1980 (#80000560)	9 Earle St. 42°16′16″N 71°47′29″W	
7	Blackstone Canal Historic District	Blackstone Canal Historic District	August 15, 1995 (#95001004)	Sites along the historic route of the Blackstone Canal; 42°13′24″N 71°47′15″W	Listing extends into other parts of Worcester, as well as Sutton, Grafton, Millbury, Northbridge, Uxbridge, Millville, Blackstone; the Rhode Island section of the canal is the subject of a separate listing (#91001536).
8	Lydia Blodgett Three-Decker	Lydia Blodgett Three-Decker	February 9, 1990 (#89002417)	167 Eastern Ave. 42°16′29″N 71°47′18″W	
9	Bloomingdale Firehouse	Bloomingdale Firehouse	March 5, 1980 (#80000593)	676 Franklin St. 42°16′02″N 71°46′27″W	
10	Bloomingdale School	Bloomingdale School	March 5, 1980 (#80000562)	327 Plantation St. 42°16′15″N 71°46′15″W	
11	Borden-Pond House	Borden-Pond House	March 5, 1980 (#80000590)	40 Laurel St. 42°16′08″N 71°47′34″W	
12	Eric Bostrom Three-Decker	Eric Bostrom Three-Decker	February 9, 1990 (#89002414)	152 Eastern Ave. 42°16′26″N 71°47′21″W	
13	Boulevard Diner	Boulevard Diner	November 22, 2000 (#00001394)	155 Shrewsbury St. 42°15′53″N 71°47′14″W	
14	Henry Bousquet Three-Decker	Henry Bousquet Three-Decker	February 9, 1990 (#89002360)	8-10 Fairmont Ave. 42°15′39″N 71°46′48″W	
15	Eric Carlson Three-Decker	Eric Carlson Three-Decker	February 9, 1990 (#89002415)	154 Eastern Ave. 42°16′27″N 71°47′20″W	
16	Chadwick-Brittan House	Chadwick-Brittan House	March 5, 1980 (#80000518)	309 Lincoln St. 42°17′11″N 71°47′25″W	
17	Frederick Daniels House	Frederick Daniels House	March 5, 1980 (#80000526)	148 Lincoln St. 42°16′43″N 71°47′39″W	
18	Dartmouth Street School	Dartmouth Street School	March 5, 1980 (#80000546)	13 Dartmouth St. 42°15′28″N 71°46′53″W	
19	Rodney Davis Three-Decker	Rodney Davis Three-Decker	February 9, 1990 (#89002398)	62 Catharine St. 42°16′27″N 71°47′16″W	
20	Mary Dean Three-Decker	Mary Dean Three-Decker	February 9, 1990 (#89002390)	130 Belmont St. 42°16′19″N 71°47′29″W	Demolished.
21	Louis Delsignore Three-Decker	Louis Delsignore Three-Decker	February 9, 1990 (#89002396)	12 Imperial Rd. 42°16′18″N 71°46′37″W	
22	Philip Duke Three-Decker	Philip Duke Three-Decker	February 9, 1990 (#89002425)	7 Maxwell St. 42°14′25″N 71°47′59″W	
23	David Dworman Three-Decker	David Dworman Three-Decker	February 9, 1990 (#89002430)	159 Providence St. 42°14′41″N 71°47′30″W	
24	East Worcester School-Norcross Factory	East Worcester School-Norcross Factory	March 5, 1980 (#80000618)	10 E. Worcester St. 42°15′45″N 71°47′26″W	
25	Elizabeth Street School	Elizabeth Street School	March 5, 1980 (#80000589)	31 Elizabeth St. 42°16′12″N 71°47′29″W	
26	Knut Erikson Three-Decker	Knut Erikson Three-Decker	February 9, 1990 (#89002438)	19 Stanton St. 42°16′24″N 71°47′09″W	
27	Euclid Avenue-Montrose Street Historic District	Euclid Avenue-Montrose Street Historic District	February 9, 1990 (#89002357)	Along Euclid Ave. and Montrose St., between Vernon St. and Perry Ave. 42°14′46″N 71°47′52″W	
28	Fay Street Historic District	Fay Street Historic District	February 9, 1990 (#89002372)	4-6 Fay St. 42°15′25″N 71°47′16″W	
29	Amos Flagg House	Amos Flagg House	March 5, 1980 (#80000515)	246 Burncoat St. 42°18′11″N 71°47′24″W	
30	Benjamin Flagg House	Benjamin Flagg House	March 5, 1980 (#80000620)	136 Plantation St. 42°15′35″N 71°46′52″W	
31	George Fontaine Three-Decker	George Fontaine Three-Decker	February 9, 1990 (#89002447)	141 Vernon St. 42°14′40″N 71°47′47″W	
32	Forest Hill Cottage	Forest Hill Cottage	March 5, 1980 (#80000529)	22 Windsor St. 42°16′40″N 71°47′27″W	
33	Andrew Friberg Three-Decker	Andrew Friberg Three-Decker	February 9, 1990 (#89002387)	26 Ames St. 42°14′33″N 71°47′43″W	
34	George Gale House	George Gale House	March 5, 1980 (#80000561)	15 Elizabeth St. 42°16′15″N 71°47′27″W	
35	Thomas Giguere Three-Decker	Thomas Giguere Three-Decker	February 9, 1990 (#89002356)	18 Fairhaven Rd. 42°18′32″N 71°47′52″W	
36	Goddard House	Goddard House	March 5, 1980 (#80000555)	12 Catharine St. 42°16′31″N 71°47′39″W	House demolished. Now a parking lot for an Oak Ave. business.
37	Goldberg Building	Goldberg Building	November 19, 2007 (#07001202)	97-103 Water St. 42°15′23″N 71°47′46″W	
38	Grafton Street School	Grafton Street School	March 5, 1980 (#80000545)	311 Grafton St. 42°15′23″N 71°47′15″W	
39	Green Hill Park Shelter	Green Hill Park Shelter	March 5, 1980 (#80000522)	Green Hill Parkway; 42°16′54″N 71°46′58″W	
40	Greendale Branch Library	Greendale Branch Library	March 5, 1980 (#80000511)	470 W. Boylston St. 42°18′26″N 71°47′59″W	
41	Greendale Village Improvement Society Building	Greendale Village Improvement Society Building	November 7, 1976 (#76000949)	480 W. Boylston St. 42°18′27″N 71°47′59″W	
42	Evert Gullberg Three-Decker	Evert Gullberg Three-Decker	February 9, 1990 (#89002388)	18 Ashton St. 42°16′58″N 71°47′27″W	
43	Higgins Armory Museum	Higgins Armory Museum	March 5, 1980 (#80000514)	100 Barber Ave. 42°17′50″N 71°47′57″W	
44	College of the Holy Cross	College of the Holy Cross	March 5, 1980 (#80000491)	Holy Cross College Campus; 42°14′21″N 71°48′30″W	This listing encompasses only Fenwick and O'Kane Halls.
45	Houghton Street Historic District	Houghton Street Historic District	February 9, 1990 (#89002371)	Houghton St. between Palm and Dorchester Sts. 42°15′10″N 71°47′08″W	
46	David Hunt Three-Decker	David Hunt Three-Decker	February 9, 1990 (#89002412)	26 Louise St. 42°14′28″N 71°47′46″W	
47	Ingleside Avenue Historic District	Ingleside Avenue Historic District	February 9, 1990 (#89002369)	218-220 and 226-228 Ingleside Ave. 42°15′05″N 71°46′48″W	
48	John and Edward Johnson Three-Decker	John and Edward Johnson Three-Decker	February 9, 1990 (#89002416)	31 Louise St. 42°14′29″N 71°47′46″W	
49	John Johnson Three-Decker	John Johnson Three-Decker	February 9, 1990 (#89002408)	140 Eastern St. 42°16′23″N 71°47′22″W	
50	Paul Johnson Three-Decker	Paul Johnson Three-Decker	February 9, 1990 (#89002437)	7 Stanton St. 42°16′23″N 71°47′10″W	
51	Erick Kaller Three-Decker	Erick Kaller Three-Decker	February 9, 1990 (#89002413)	146 Eastern Ave. 42°16′24″N 71°47′22″W	
52	Erick Kaller Three-Decker	Erick Kaller Three-Decker	February 9, 1990 (#89002411)	148 Eastern Ave. 42°16′25″N 71°47′22″W	
53	Larchmont	Larchmont	March 5, 1980 (#80000492)	36 Butler St. 42°14′06″N 71°47′58″W	
54	Swan Larson Three-Decker	Swan Larson Three-Decker	February 9, 1990 (#89002443)	12 Summerhill Ave. 42°18′20″N 71°47′56″W	
55	Morris Levenson Three-Decker	Morris Levenson Three-Decker	February 9, 1990 (#89002446)	38 Plantation St. 42°15′12″N 71°46′56″W	
56	Charles Lundberg Three-Decker	Charles Lundberg Three-Decker	February 9, 1990 (#89002399)	67 Catharine St. 42°16′27″N 71°47′16″W	
57	Charles Magnuson Three-Decker	Charles Magnuson Three-Decker	February 9, 1990 (#89002434)	56/58 Olga Ave. 42°16′27″N 71°47′03″W	
58	Malvern Road School	Malvern Road School	October 4, 1984 (#84000096)	Malvern Rd. and Southbridge St. 42°14′07″N 71°49′01″W	
59	Anthony Massad Three-Decker	Anthony Massad Three-Decker	February 9, 1990 (#89002380)	14 Harlow St. 42°17′01″N 71°47′39″W	
60	Patrick McGrath Three-Decker	Patrick McGrath Three-Decker	February 9, 1990 (#89002407)	40 Dorchester St. 42°15′05″N 71°47′40″W	
61	Patrick McGuinness Three-Decker	Patrick McGuinness Three-Decker	February 9, 1990 (#89002439)	25 Suffield St. 42°14′59″N 71°47′50″W	
62	Frank McPartland Three-Decker	Frank McPartland Three-Decker	February 9, 1990 (#89002436)	61 Paine St. 42°16′54″N 71°47′40″W	
63	Charles Miles House	Charles Miles House	March 5, 1980 (#80000527)	13 Lincoln St. 42°16′41″N 71°47′39″W	
64	Jesse Moore House	Jesse Moore House	March 5, 1980 (#80000557)	25 Catharine St. 42°16′32″N 71°47′32″W	
65	Sarah Munroe Three-Decker	Sarah Munroe Three-Decker	February 9, 1990 (#89002432)	11 Rodney St. 42°16′23″N 71°47′15″W	Also spelled "Monroe".
66	Patrick Murphy Three-Decker	Patrick Murphy Three-Decker	February 9, 1990 (#89002404)	31 Jefferson St. 42°15′13″N 71°47′38″W	
67	Christina Nelson Three-Decker	Christina Nelson Three-Decker	February 9, 1990 (#89002391)	45 Butler St. 42°14′03″N 71°48′00″W	
68	Richard O'Brien Three-Decker	Richard O'Brien Three-Decker	February 9, 1990 (#89002441)	43 Suffolk St. 42°15′30″N 71°47′15″W	
69	Odd Fellows' Home	Odd Fellows' Home	March 5, 1980 (#80000513)	40 Randolph Rd. 42°17′56″N 71°47′51″W	Building was torn down to make way for construction of an alzheimer's/dementia facility.
70	Timothy Paine House	Timothy Paine House	April 30, 1976 (#76000948)	140 Lincoln St. 42°16′41″N 71°47′42″W	
71	Perry Avenue Historic District	Perry Avenue Historic District	February 9, 1990 (#89002367)	45-55 Perry Ave. 42°14′53″N 71°47′54″W	
72	Lars Petterson-Adolph Carlson Three-Decker	Lars Petterson-Adolph Carlson Three-Decker	February 9, 1990 (#89002358)	76 Fairhaven Rd. 42°18′32″N 71°47′43″W	
73	Lars Petterson-Fred Gurney Three-Decker	Lars Petterson-Fred Gurney Three-Decker	February 9, 1990 (#89002368)	2 Harlow St. 42°17′00″N 71°47′33″W	
74	Lars Petterson-Silas Archer Three-Decker	Lars Petterson-Silas Archer Three-Decker	February 9, 1990 (#89002359)	80 Fairhaven Rd. 42°18′32″N 71°47′40″W	
75	Lars Petterson-James Reidy Three-Decker	Lars Petterson-James Reidy Three-Decker	February 9, 1990 (#89002376)	4 Harlow St. 42°17′00″N 71°47′35″W	
76	Addison Prentiss House	Addison Prentiss House	March 5, 1980 (#80000558)	3 Channing Way; 42°16′26″N 71°47′32″W	
77	Providence Street Firehouse	Providence Street Firehouse	March 5, 1980 (#80000553)	98 Providence St. 42°15′04″N 71°47′36″W	
78	Providence Street Historic District	Providence Street Historic District	February 9, 1990 (#89002381)	127-145 Providence St. 42°14′47″N 71°47′32″W	
79	Arthur Provost Three-Decker	Arthur Provost Three-Decker	February 9, 1990 (#89002444)	30 Thorne St. 42°15′27″N 71°47′04″W	
80	Quinsigamond Branch Library	Quinsigamond Branch Library	March 5, 1980 (#80000494)	812 Millbury St. 42°14′03″N 71°47′47″W	
81	Quinsigamond Firehouse	Quinsigamond Firehouse	March 5, 1980 (#80000495)	15 Blackstone River Rd. 42°14′01″N 71°47′44″W	
82	Ezra Rice House	Ezra Rice House	March 5, 1980 (#80000507)	1133 W. Boylston St. 42°20′04″N 71°47′24″W	
83	Catharine Roynane Three-Decker	Catharine Roynane Three-Decker	February 9, 1990 (#89002397)	18 Ingalls St. 42°15′15″N 71°47′44″W	Also spelled "Ronayne".
84	Draper Ruggles House	Draper Ruggles House	March 5, 1980 (#80000556)	21 Catharine St. 42°16′32″N 71°47′35″W	
85	Shaarai Torah Synagogue	Shaarai Torah Synagogue	May 7, 1990 (#90000729)	32 Providence St. 42°15′21″N 71°47′38″W	
86	Bridget Shea Three-Decker	Bridget Shea Three-Decker	February 9, 1990 (#89002400)	21 Jefferson St. 42°15′13″N 71°47′43″W	
87	Soho Cottage	Soho Cottage	March 5, 1980 (#80000528)	21 Windsor St. 42°16′40″N 71°47′28″W	
88	Edna Stoliker Three-Decker	Edna Stoliker Three-Decker	February 9, 1990 (#89002449)	41 Plantation St. 42°15′13″N 71°46′57″W	
89	Leonard Sturtevant House	Leonard Sturtevant House	March 5, 1980 (#80000591)	84 Mulberry St. 42°16′02″N 71°47′32″W	
90	D. Wheeler Swift House	D. Wheeler Swift House	March 5, 1980 (#80000559)	22 Oak Ave. 42°16′23″N 71°47′37″W	
91	Upsala Street School	Upsala Street School	March 5, 1980 (#80000493)	36 Upsala St. 42°14′30″N 71°47′44″W	
92	View Street Historic District	View Street Historic District	February 9, 1990 (#89002361)	7-17 and 8-16 View St. 42°14′49″N 71°47′50″W	
93	Ward Street School-Millbury Street	Ward Street School-Millbury Street	March 5, 1980 (#80000488)	389 Millbury St. 42°14′43″N 71°48′06″W	
94	Woodford Street Historic District	Woodford Street Historic District	February 9, 1990 (#89002365)	34-39 and 38-40 Woodford St. 42°14′36″N 71°47′26″W	
95	Worcester Academy Historic District	Worcester Academy Historic District	March 5, 1980 (#80000478)	Worcester Academy Campus; 42°15′10″N 71°47′30″W	District includes Walker Hall, the Megaron, Adams Hall, Dexter Hall, Kingsley Laboratories, and Daniels Gymnasium.
96	Worcester Asylum and related buildings	Worcester Asylum and related buildings	March 5, 1980 (#80000530)	305 Belmont St. 42°16′39″N 71°46′25″W	Now known as the Worcester State Hospital.
97	Worcester State Hospital Farmhouse	Worcester State Hospital Farmhouse	July 3, 2017 (#100001262)	361 Plantation St. 42°16′32″N 71°46′02″W	
98	Anthony Zemaitis Three-Decker	Anthony Zemaitis Three-Decker	February 9, 1990 (#89002401)	35 Dartmouth St. 42°15′28″N 71°46′46″W	

== See also ==
- National Register of Historic Places listings in Worcester, Massachusetts
- National Register of Historic Places listings in northwestern Worcester, Massachusetts
- National Register of Historic Places listings in southwestern Worcester, Massachusetts
- National Register of Historic Places listings in Worcester County, Massachusetts
