= Andrew Friberg Three-Decker =

- U.S. National Register of Historic Places
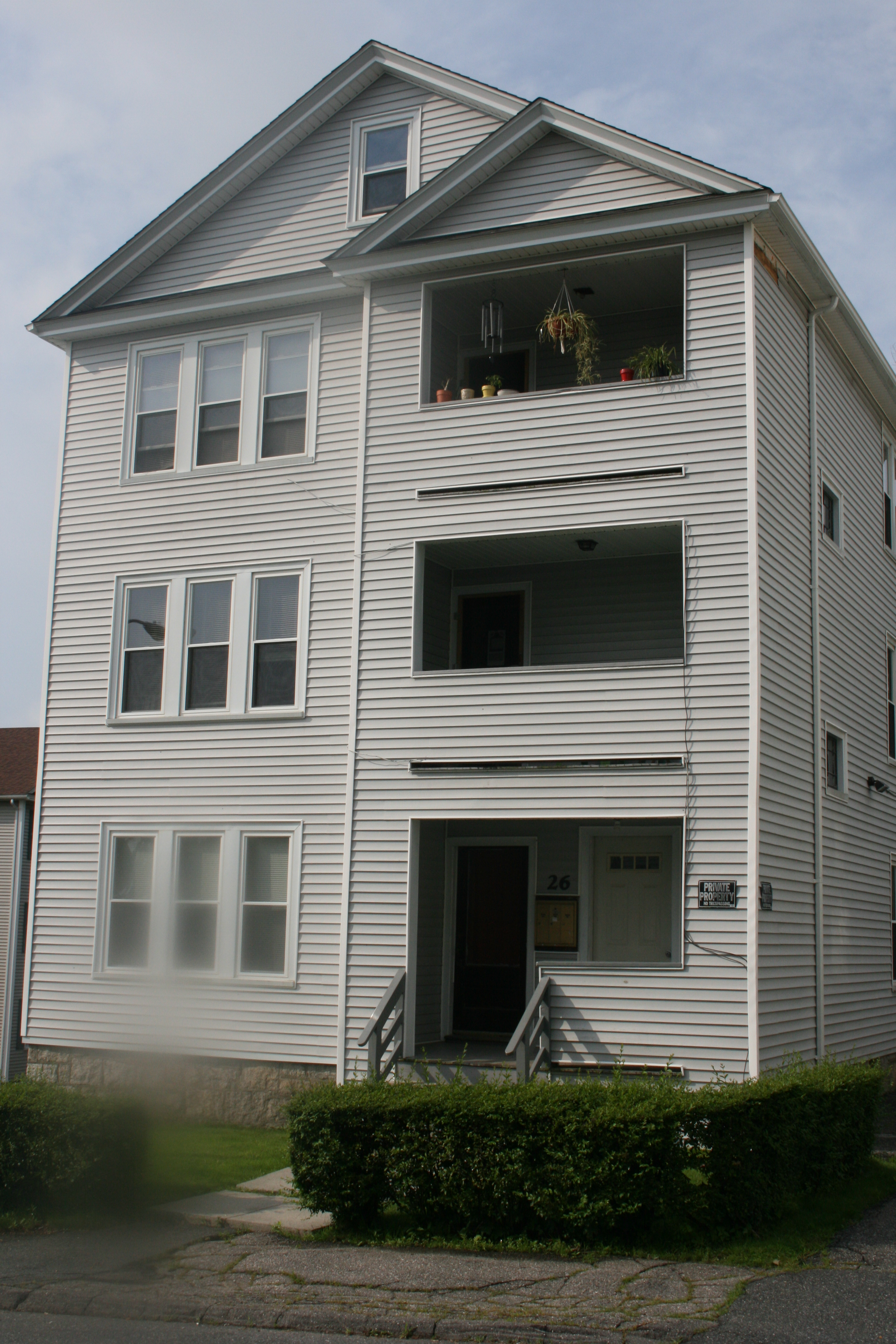

- Location within Massachusetts Location within the United States
- Location: 26 Ames St., Worcester, Massachusetts
- Coordinates: 42°14′33″N 71°47′43″W
- Area: less than one acre
- Built: c. 1928
- Architectural style: Colonial Revival
- MPS: Worcester Three-Deckers TR
- NRHP reference No.: 89002387
- Added to NRHP: February 9, 1990

The Andrew Friberg Three-Decker is a historic triple decker in Worcester, Massachusetts, United States. Built about 1928, it was listed on the National Register of Historic Places in 1990, noted for its Colonial Revival styling. These details have been lost or obscured by later exterior siding installation (see photo).

== Description and history ==
The Andrew Friberg Three-Decker is located in Worcester's southeastern Vernon Hill neighborhood, at the southwest corner of Ames and Stockton Streets. It is a three-story wood frame structure, covered by a gabled roof and finished with synthetic siding. Its main facade is asymmetrical, with bands of three sash windows on the left side, and a projecting stack of porches on the right. Both the main roof and the porch projection have fully pedimented gables.

The house was built about 1928, during the last major phase of development in the Vernon Hill area. It is differentiated from earlier triple-deckers by the lack of a projecting polygonal bay, the usual accompaniment to the porch stack. A band of three windows is also found on the building's side, where earlier triple-deckers also often had a projecting bay. When the building was listed on the National Register of Historic Places in 1990, it was noted for its Colonial Revival styling, including porches supported by Tuscan columns and banded decorative shingling between the floors. Andrew Friberg, the building's first owner, was a Swedish immigrant laborer who also lived here. Other early residents were of Swedish and Irish origin.

== See also ==
- National Register of Historic Places listings in eastern Worcester, Massachusetts
