= Bloomingdale School (Massachusetts) =

- U.S. National Register of Historic Places
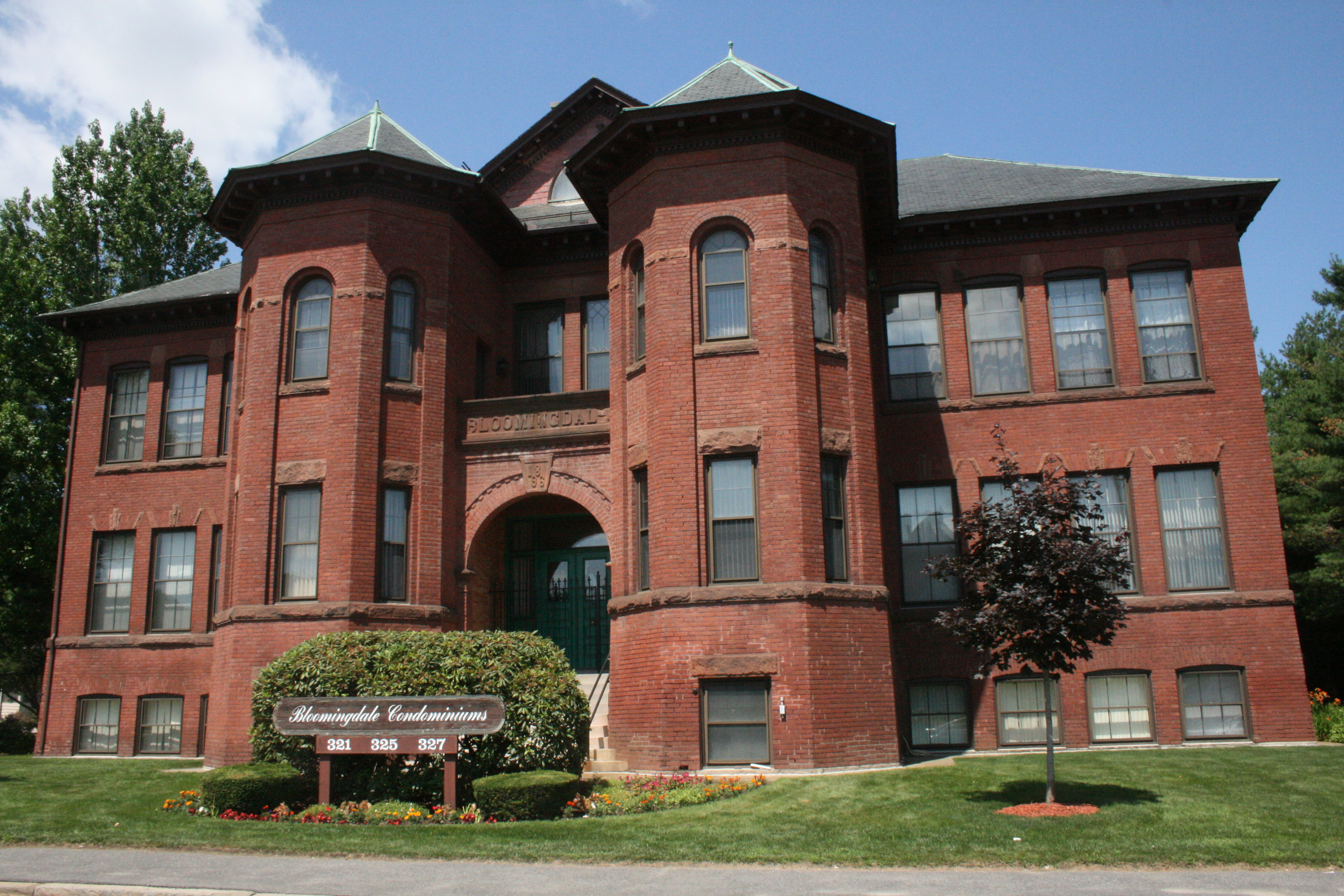

- Location within Massachusetts Location within the United States
- Location: 327 Plantation St., Worcester, Massachusetts
- Coordinates: 42°16′14″N 71°46′17″W
- Built: 1896
- Architectural style: Romanesque
- MPS: Worcester MRA
- NRHP reference No.: 80000562
- Added to NRHP: March 05, 1980

The Bloomingdale School is a historic former school building at 327 Plantation Street in Worcester, Massachusetts. Built in 1896, it is a notable local example of Richardsonian Romanesque architecture. It was used as a school until 1982, after which it was converted into residences. The building was listed on the National Register of Historic Places in 1980.

== Description and history ==
The former Bloomingdale School stands at the northwest corner of Plantation Street and Tampa Street in central Worcester. It is a large 2-1/2 story brick building with a hip roof and a high basement, which is separated from the first floor by a rusticated brownstone water table. Its main facade, facing roughly east, is dominated by a pair of projecting octagonal bays, which flank the main entrance, which is recessed under an archway. Tall sash windows line the walls on either side of these bays, with flat lintels on the first level, and either round-arch or segmented-arch tops on the second level.

The building was built in 1896; its architect is not known. Originally housing just four classrooms, the building was enlarged in 1916, using plans laid for such an expansion at the time of its initial construction. A second school building was added to the rear of the property (facing Tampa Street) in 1928. The building served as a school until 1982, and was after converted into residential condominiums. The second school building was only used until the 1930s, and stood vacant for many years, before also being renovated into residences.

== See also ==
- National Register of Historic Places listings in eastern Worcester, Massachusetts
