= Edna Stoliker Three-Decker =

- U.S. National Register of Historic Places
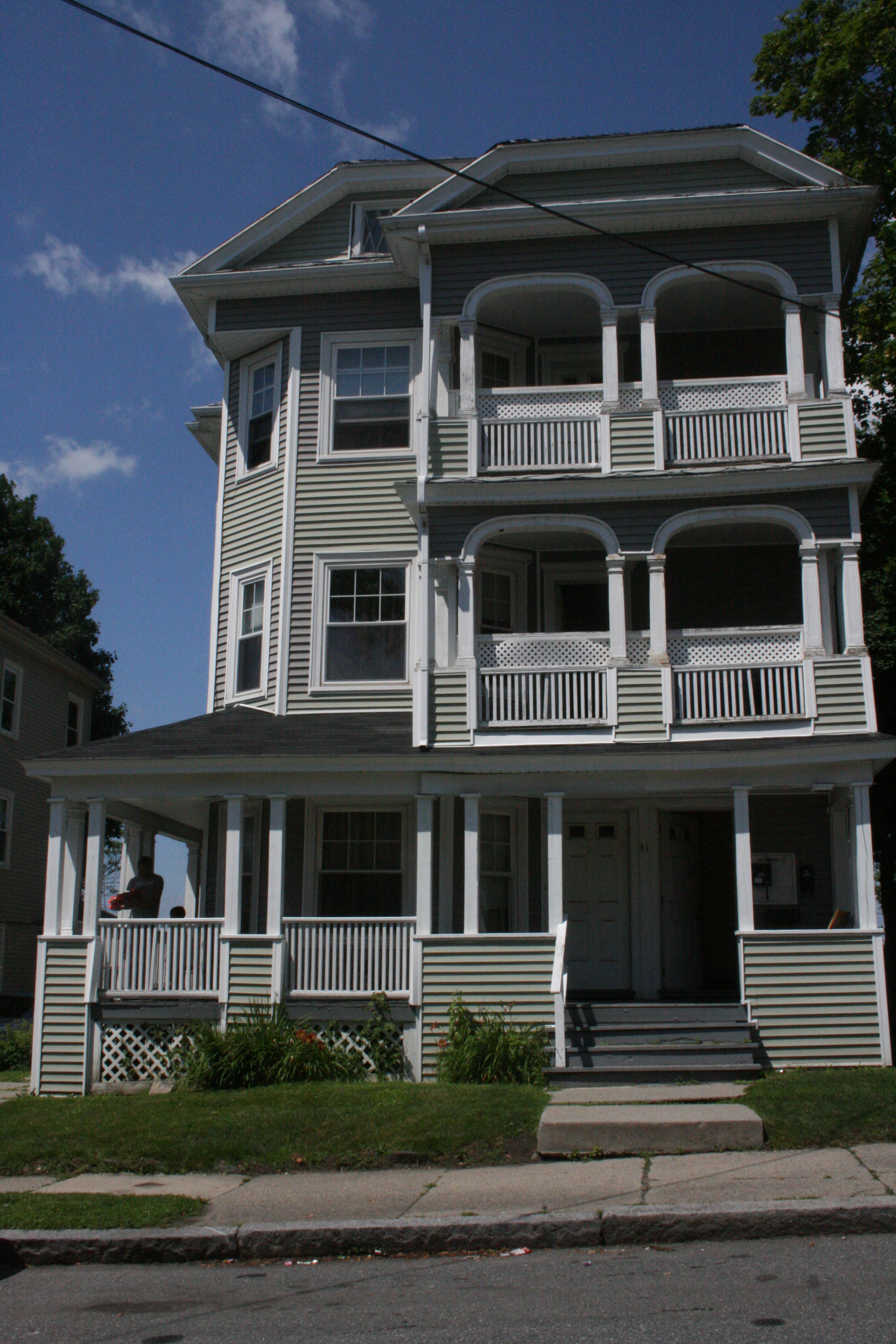

- Location within Massachusetts Location within the United States
- Location: 41 Plantation St., Worcester, Massachusetts
- Coordinates: 42°15′13″N 71°46′57″W
- Area: less than one acre
- Built: 1916
- Architectural style: Colonial Revival
- MPS: Worcester Three-Deckers TR
- NRHP reference No.: 89002449
- Added to NRHP: February 9, 1990

The Edna Stoliker Three-Decker is a historic triple decker in Worcester, Massachusetts. Built c. 1916, it is a well-preserved local example of Colonial Revival styling. It was listed on the National Register of Historic Places in 1990.

== Description and history ==
The Edna Stoliker Three-Decker is located in a residential part of southeastern Worcester, on the west side of Plantation Street near its junction with Cohasset Street. It is a three-story wood frame structure, with a hip roof and exterior clad mostly in modern siding. It has a typical side-hall plan, but is distinctive in that its projecting bays vary in style, and that its first-floor porch wraps around to the side. The porch is supported by heavy square columns either singly or in pairs, and the smaller upper-level porches have arched openings. The porches are covered by a truncated hip roof with a deep pediment, and the main roof gable has a square window with original tracery. Features lost due to the application of modern siding include shingle bands between the floors of the projecting window bay, and modillion blocks in the porch's eave.

The house was built about 1916, during a major real-estate development phase in the city's southeast. Edna Stoliker, the first owner, was also resident here; early tenants included a teamster, homemaker, policeman, and railroad conductor.

== See also ==
- National Register of Historic Places listings in eastern Worcester, Massachusetts
