= National Register of Historic Places listings in Worcester, Massachusetts =

The city of Worcester, Massachusetts, has 289 properties and districts listed on the National Register of Historic Places.

== Current listings ==
Because of the large number of listings, the list has been split into three sections. Eastern Worcester is all of the city east of the north-south route of I-190 and I-290. Northwestern Worcester is the part of the city west of those highways and north of Massachusetts Route 122. Finally, southwestern Worcester covers the area south of Route 122 and west of the highways.

Two historic districts have boundaries that cover portions of more than one section of the city: milestones that make up the 1767 Milestones are found in the northwestern and eastern sections, and the Blackstone Canal Historic District extends through all three sections.

Contents: Counties in Massachusetts

Barnstable | Berkshire | Bristol | Dukes | Essex | Franklin | Hampden | Hampshire | Middlesex | Nantucket | Norfolk | Plymouth | Suffolk | Worcester

This National Park Service list is complete through NPS recent listings posted March 20, 2026.

Area	Image	First Date listed	Last Date listed	Count
Eastern		May 7, 1971	July 3, 2017	98
Northwestern		November 24, 1968	August 22, 2023	112
Southwestern		March 5, 1980	May 20, 2024	82
Duplicates				(3)
Total				292
