= Amos Flagg House =

Historic house in Massachusetts, United States

- U.S. National Register of Historic Places
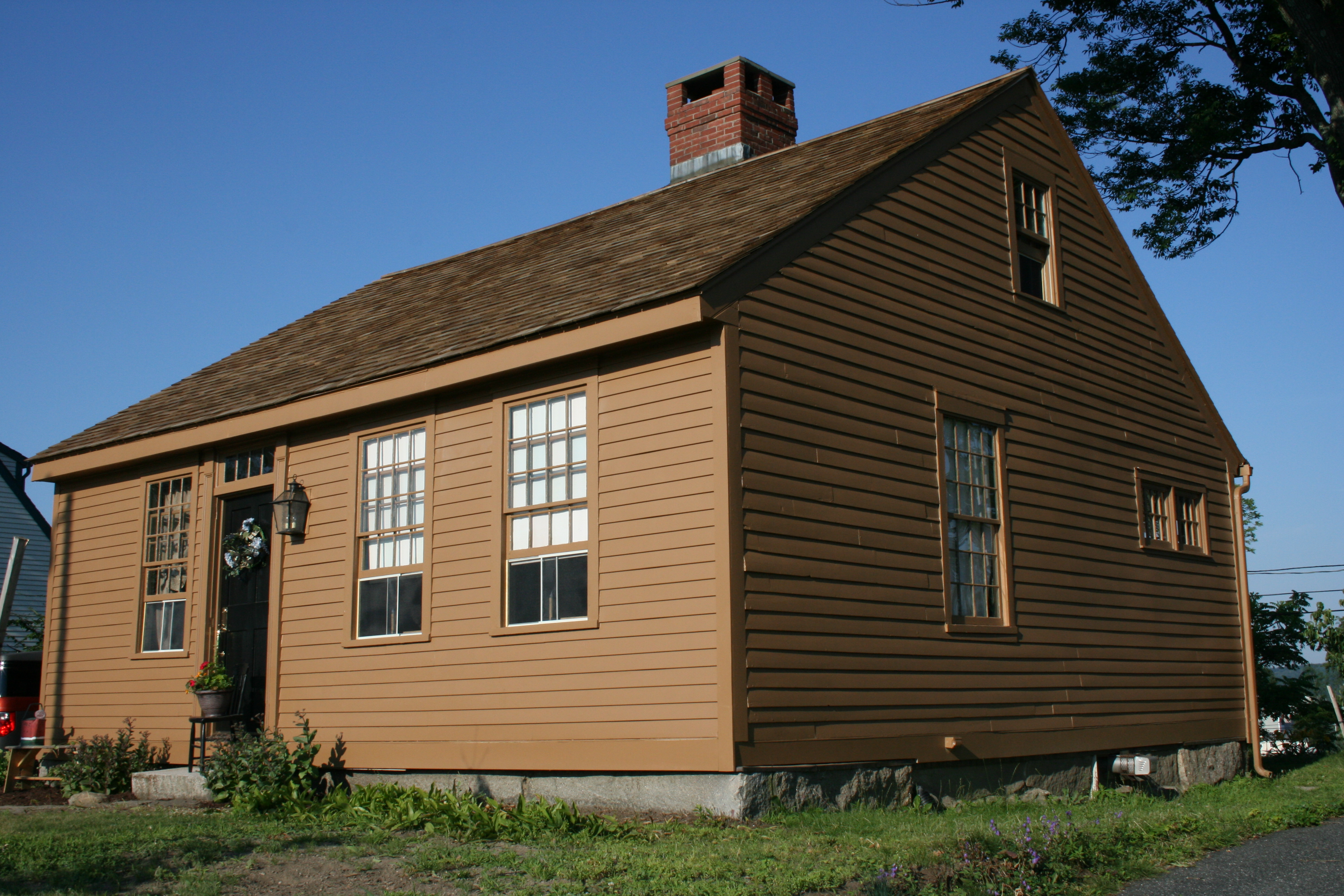

- Location within Massachusetts Location within the United States
- Location: 246 Burncoat St., Worcester, Massachusetts
- Coordinates: 42°18′11″N 71°47′24″W
- Area: less than one acre
- Built: c. 1748
- MPS: Worcester MRA
- NRHP reference No.: 80000515
- Added to NRHP: March 5, 1980

The Amos Flagg House is a historic colonial-era house at 246 Burncoat Street in Worcester, Massachusetts. Built about 1748, it is one of the city's few surviving 18th-century buildings. The house was listed on the National Register of Historic Places in 1980.

== Description and history ==
The Amos Flagg House is located in a predominantly residential area of northeastern Worcester, on the west side of Burncoat Street opposite its junction with Monterey Road. It is a 1 1/2-story timber-frame structure, with a side gable roof, central chimney, and clapboarded exterior. It has an asymmetrical facade, four bays wide, with the entrance in the center-left bay. Its front door is slightly recessed, with a four-pane transom window above. Single-story ells extend to the rear of the original main block.

The early history of the house is not known, due to a lack of documentation about the area, which is remote to the center of Worcester and remained rural into the 20th century. The house was probably built by Alan Flagg, on a 50-acre (20 ha) parcel sold or mortgaged to Jonas Gale in 1748. In 1816, the property came into the hands of Alan's son Amos, around the time of his marriage. In 1825 the property was taken over by Jonathan White, who married Flagg's widow. The property remained in White family hands until 1914, when it was subdivided for residential development.

== See also ==
- National Register of Historic Places listings in eastern Worcester, Massachusetts
