= View Street Historic District =

Historic district in Massachusetts, United States

- U.S. National Register of Historic Places
- U.S. Historic district
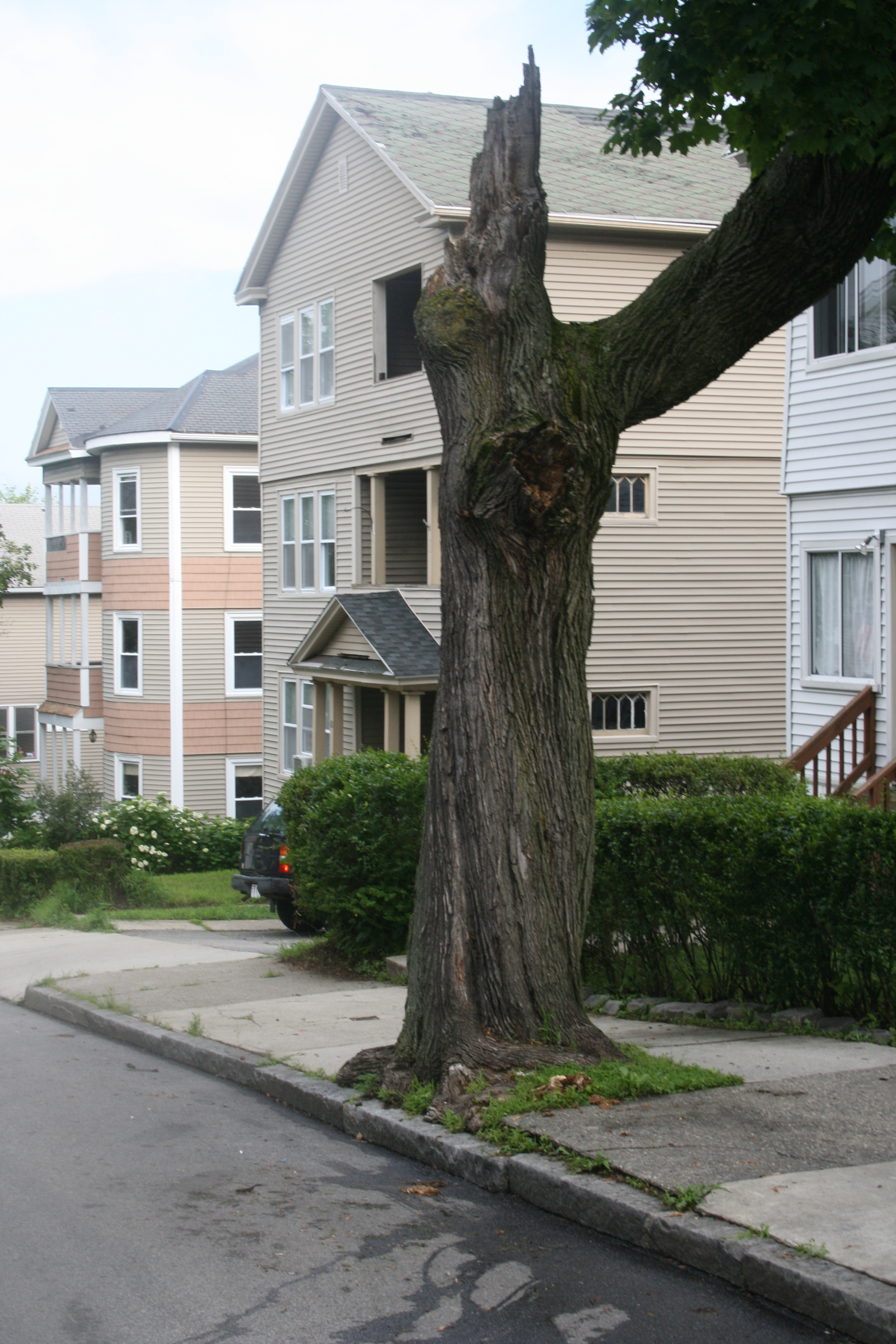

- Location within Massachusetts Location within the United States
- Location: 7–17 View Street, Worcester, Massachusetts
- Coordinates: 42°14′49″N 71°47′50″W
- Area: 1.77 acres (0.72 ha)
- Architectural style: Colonial Revival
- MPS: Worcester Three-Deckers TR
- NRHP reference No.: 89002361
- Added to NRHP: February 9, 1990

The View Street Historic District is a residential historic district in Worcester, Massachusetts. It contains eleven triple decker houses, nine of which are particularly well preserved. They were built between 1916 and 1930, during the late phase of triple decker construction in the Vernon Hill area, and have Colonial Revival styling. The district was listed on the National Register of Historic Places in 1990.

View Street was laid out in the 1910s, as development of Worcester's east side pushed into the steeper terrain of Vernon Hill. The area was attractive to the working classes, for it had good views, and the streetcar that ran on Vernon Street provided ready access to the city center and factories. 8 View Street, among the first houses to be built c. 1916, has a gambrel roof and a two-level porch supported by slender Tuscan columns. The houses at 9 and 16 View Street have had synthetic siding applied, compromising their historic styling. Those at 10, 11, 14 and 15 View Street are relatively simple rectangular blocks with gable roofs and recessed two-level porches with a simple rectangular opening at the third level. 7 View Street differs from the others in being clad completely in shingles, where the others are generally clapboarded. The porch at 12 View Street is capped by a projecting gabled pediment, and its cornice features regularly spaced brackets. Early occupants of these buildings were typically skilled laborers or lower-class office and commercial workers.

== See also ==
- National Register of Historic Places listings in eastern Worcester, Massachusetts
