= Leonard Sturtevant House =

Historic house in Massachusetts, United States

- U.S. National Register of Historic Places
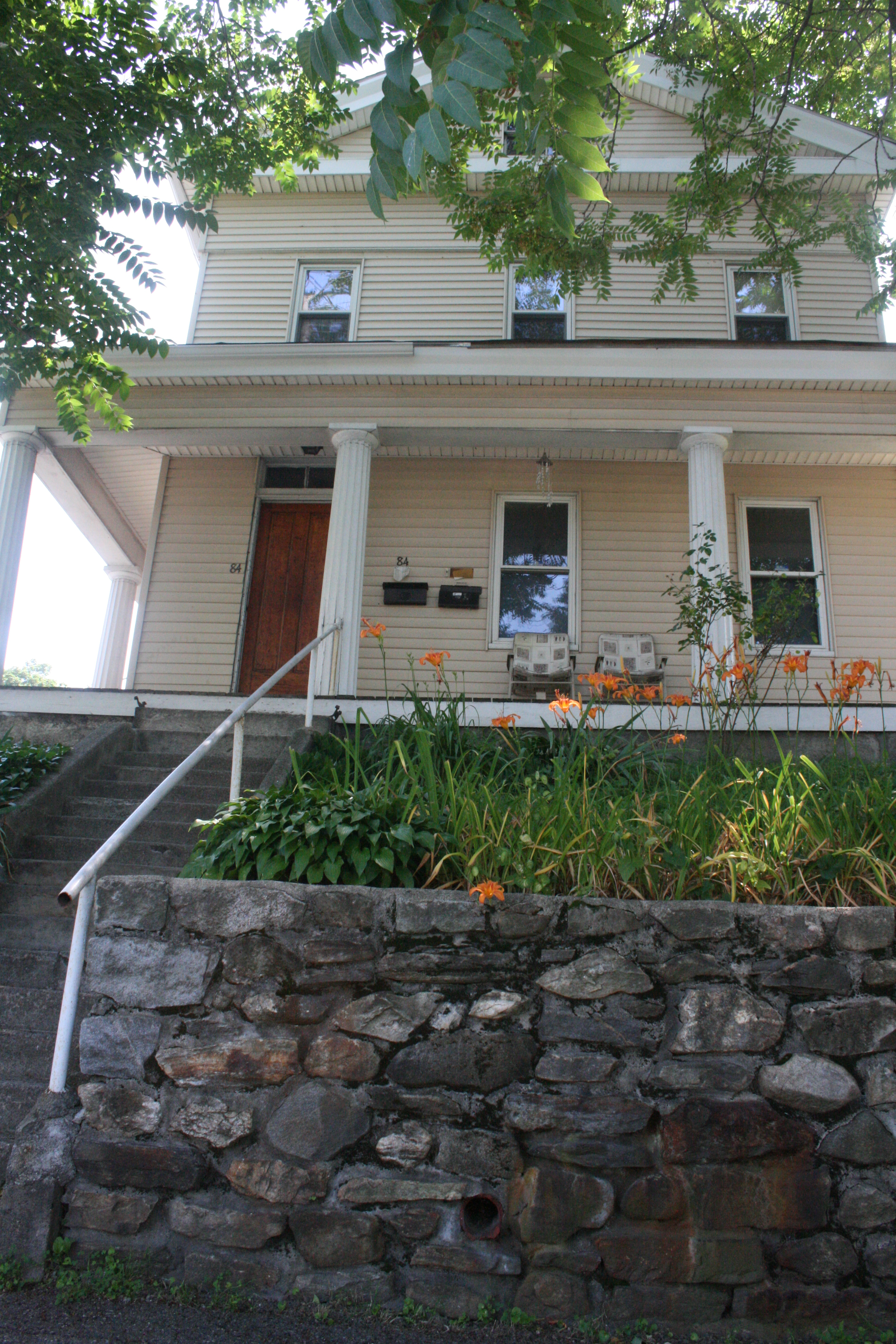

- Location within Massachusetts Location within the United States
- Location: 84 Mulberry St., Worcester, Massachusetts
- Coordinates: 42°16′12″N 71°47′35″W
- Area: less than one acre
- Built: c. 1849
- Architectural style: Greek Revival
- MPS: Worcester MRA
- NRHP reference No.: 80000591
- Added to NRHP: March 05, 1980

The Leonard Sturtevant House is a historic house at 84 Mulberry Street in Worcester, Massachusetts. Built c. 1849, it is a locally distinctive variant of Greek Revival styling, and a rare surviving element of the early development of the city's Belmont Hill area. It was listed on the National Register of Historic Places in 1980.

== Description and history ==
The Leonard Sturtevant House is located southeast of downtown Worcester, at the southeast corner of Mulberry and Prospect Streets near the base of Belmont Hill. It is a 2 1/2-story wood-frame structure, with a gabled roof and exterior clad in modern siding. The house has a T shape, with projecting rectangular sections on each side. Both the front gable and the gables of the projections are fully pedimented; the main gable has an arched window in the tympanum, while the side gables have small octagonal windows. The cross of the T is topped by a square cupola. An open porch supported by Doric columns wraps around to the sides of the house. Portions of the house's originally more elaborate Greek Revival design have been obscured or lost by the application of modern siding.

The house was built about 1849, a period when Belmont Hill saw a brief boom of middle-class housing set on spacious lots. This period did not last, because of the area's close proximity to industrial sites and a notoriously problematic immigrant quarter, and was largely redeveloped with more dense lower-class worker housing later in the 19th century. Leonard Sturtevant, the first documented owner, was a tailor who lived here in the late 19th century.

== See also ==
- National Register of Historic Places listings in eastern Worcester, Massachusetts
