= Louis Delsignore Three-Decker =

- U.S. National Register of Historic Places
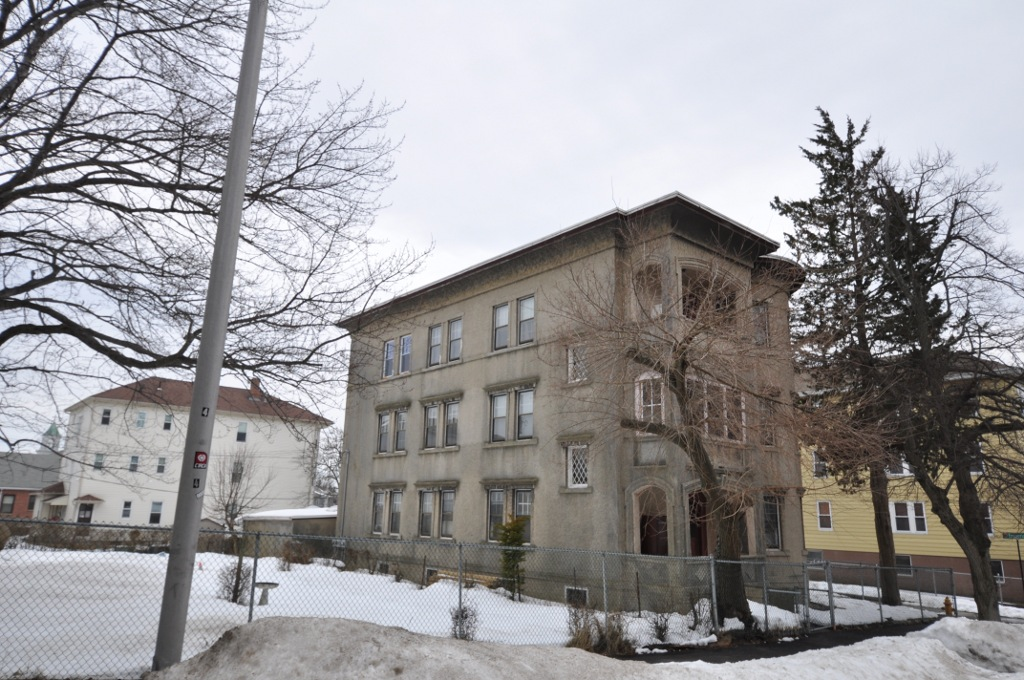

- Location within Massachusetts Location within the United States
- Location: 12 Imperial Rd., Worcester, Massachusetts
- Coordinates: 42°16′17″N 71°46′39″W
- Area: less than one acre
- Built: c. 1916
- MPS: Worcester Three-Deckers TR
- NRHP reference No.: 89002396
- Added to NRHP: February 9, 1990

The Louis Delsignore Three-Decker is a historic triple decker in Worcester, Massachusetts. Built about 1916, it is the only stuccoed triple decker in the city, and is a symbol of the city's eastward growth fueled by the arrival of Italian immigrants. It was listed on the National Register of Historic Places in 1990.

== Description and history ==
The Louis Delsignore Three-Decker is located in Worcester eastern Shrewsbury Street residential area, on the east side of Imperial Road at its junction with Imperial Place. It is a three-story frame structure, with a flat roof that has a deep projecting cornice. The exterior is finished in stucco, believed to be the only triple-decker in the city finished in that way. The front facade is asymmetrical, with a porch stack on the left, and a projecting window bay on the right. Its porch openings have distinctive hood moulds, and the window bays are rounded rather than the more usual polygon shape. A second projecting window bay, shallower than that on the front, is found on the right side. A small garage, also finished in stucco, is set at the back of the property.

Built about 1916, its first documented owner was Louis Delsignore, a mason who may have been responsible for its stucco finish. The building's early owners and occupants were Italian immigrants, a population that was expanding into southeastern Worcester in the first two decades of the 20th century.

== See also ==
- National Register of Historic Places listings in eastern Worcester, Massachusetts
