= Chadwick-Brittan House =

Historic house in Massachusetts, United States

- U.S. National Register of Historic Places
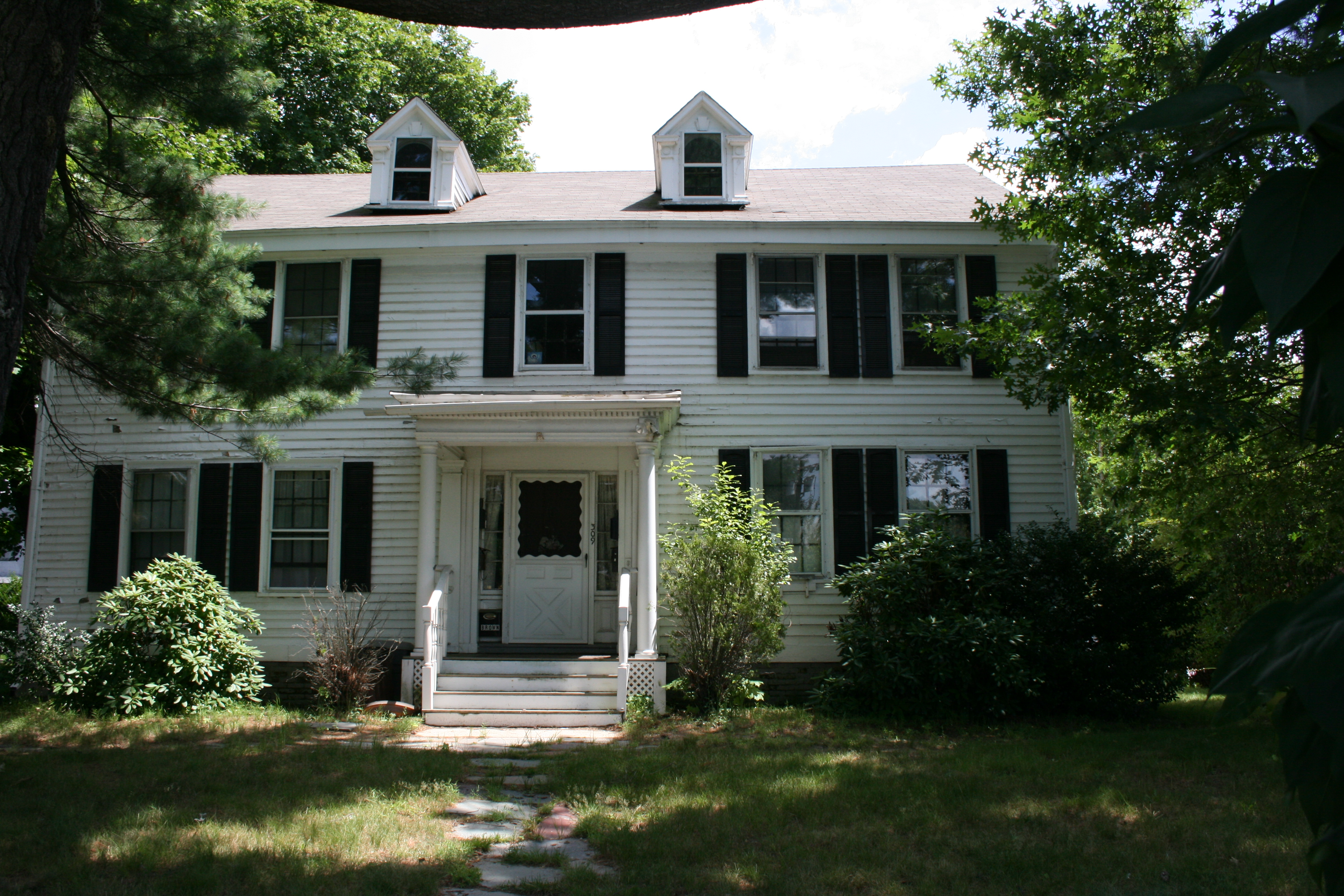

- Location within Massachusetts Location within the United States
- Location: 309 Lincoln St., Worcester, Massachusetts
- Coordinates: 42°17′11″N 71°47′25″W
- Area: less than one acre
- Built: c. 1797
- Architectural style: Federal
- MPS: Worcester MRA
- NRHP reference No.: 80000518
- Added to NRHP: March 05, 1980

The Chadwick-Brittan House is a historic house at 309 Lincoln Street in Worcester, Massachusetts. It is estimated to have been built c. 1797, and is one of the few surviving Federal-style houses in the city. It was listed on the National Register of Historic Places in 1980.

== Description and history ==
The Chadwick-Brittan House is located in a mixed residential-commercial area northeast of downtown Worcester, on the east side of Lincoln Street (Massachusetts Route 70) at Shaffner Street. It is a 2 1/2-story wood-frame structure, with a gabled roof, two interior chimneys, and a clapboarded exterior. It has a five-bay center entrance facade, typical of the period, although the entry has been given Greek Revival treatment, with sidelight windows and a portico supported by round columns. The dormers in the roof are a c. 1900 Colonial Revival addition. A two-story ell extends to the rear of the main block.

The house has an uncertain early history, owing to a lack of period documentation. It is believed to have been in use as a tavern named the Chadwick Hotel c. 1800, but was in private ownership by 1833. In the mid-19th century it was owned by Josiah Brittan, a major local landowner and operator of a brickyard. In the late 19th century most of the land previously associated with the house was sold off for residential development. At that time, the house may have been moved slightly to make way for the laying out of Shaffner Street.

== See also ==
- National Register of Historic Places listings in eastern Worcester, Massachusetts
