= Bridget Shea Three-Decker =

- U.S. National Register of Historic Places
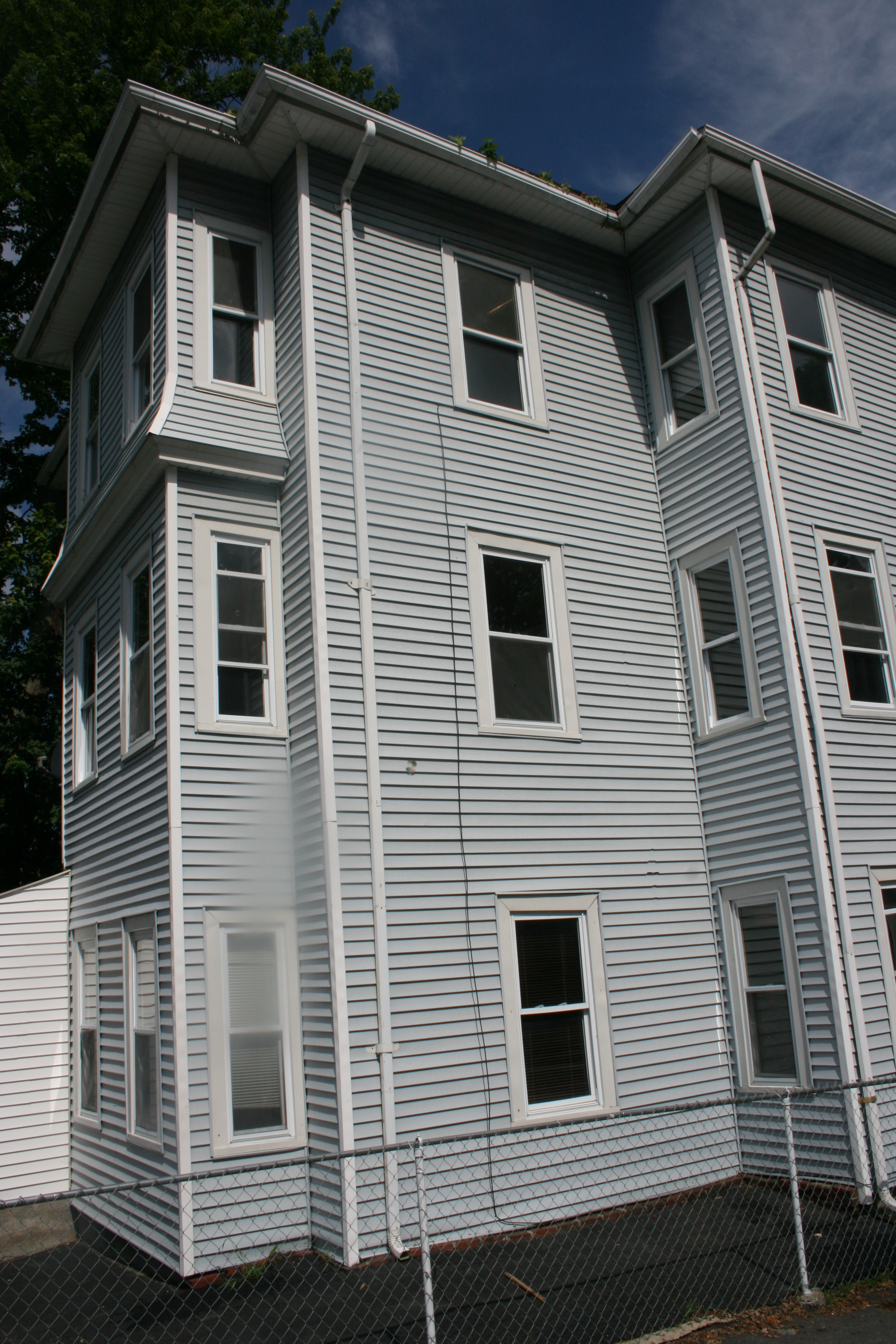

- Location within Massachusetts Location within the United States
- Location: 21 Jefferson St., Worcester, Massachusetts
- Coordinates: 42°15′13″N 71°47′43″W
- Area: less than one acre
- Built: c. 1888
- Architectural style: Queen Anne
- MPS: Worcester Three-Deckers TR
- NRHP reference No.: 89002400
- Added to NRHP: February 9, 1990

The Bridget Shea Three-Decker is a historic triple decker house in Worcester, Massachusetts. Built c. 1888, the house was described as a well-preserved Queen Anne structure when it was listed on the National Register of Historic Places in 1990. It has since lost many of its period details (see photo).

== Description and history ==
The Bridget Shea Three-Decker is located in Worcester's southeastern Oak Hill neighborhood, at the northwest corner of Jefferson and Fox Streets. It is a three-story wood frame structure, covered by a hip roof and finished modern siding. The main facade is asymmetrical, with a projecting rectangular bay on the right side and the main entrance on the left. The entrance is sheltered by an enclosed vestibule with a shed roof. The right side bay houses two windows on the front face and single windows on the sides. The second and third floors of the bay are separated by a flared skirt.

The house was built about 1888, during the early phase of development in the Oak Hill area. Many of its period details, including corner braces and cut shingle sheathing, have been lost or obscured by subsequent siding work (see photo). The early owners and tenants of the house were mainly Irish immigrants, who moved to this part of Worcester in large numbers in the late 19th century. The Shea family, who were its first documented owners, included two machinists; other early residents included a weaver, watchman, and clerk.

== See also ==
- National Register of Historic Places listings in eastern Worcester, Massachusetts
