= Goldberg Building =

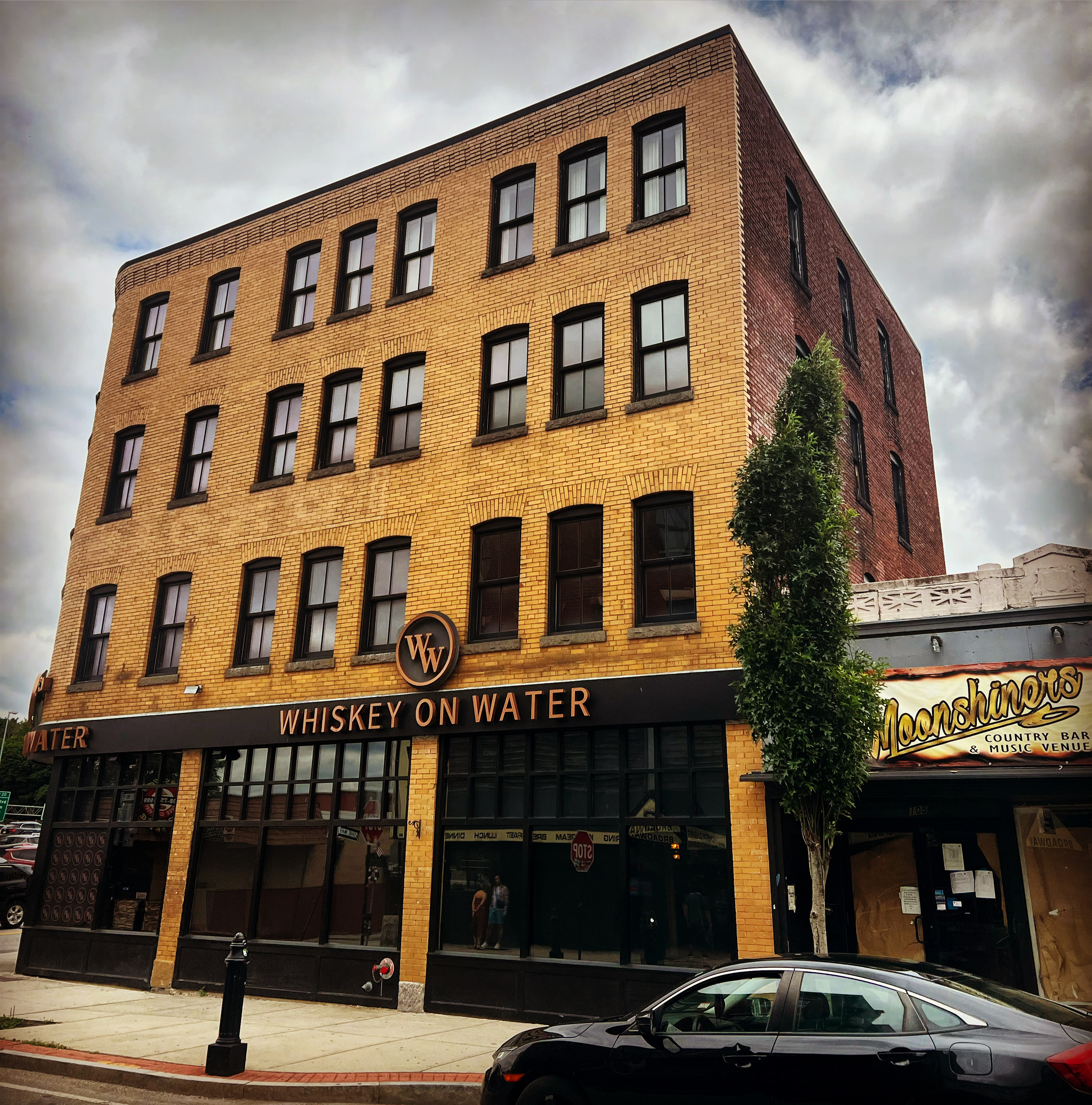

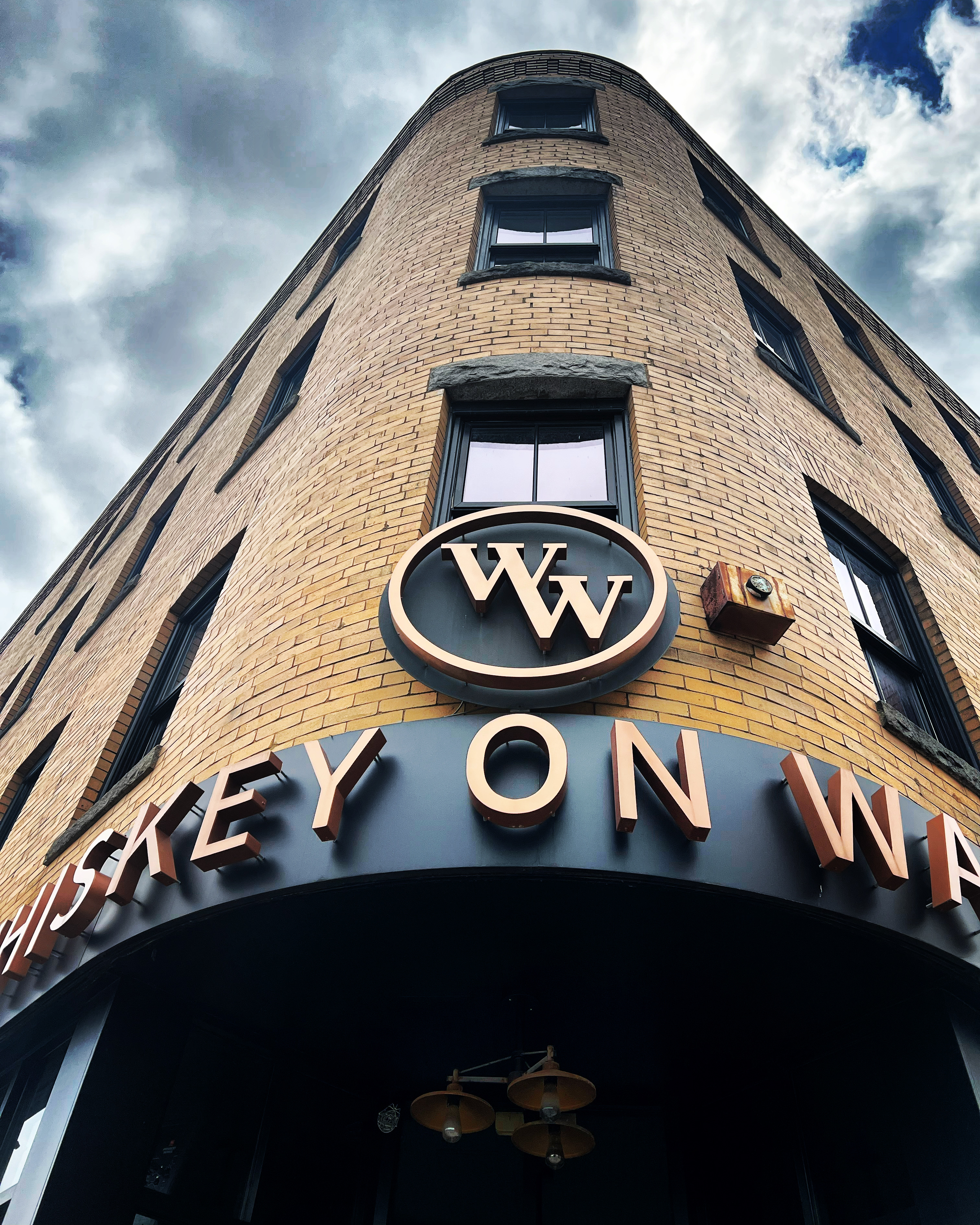

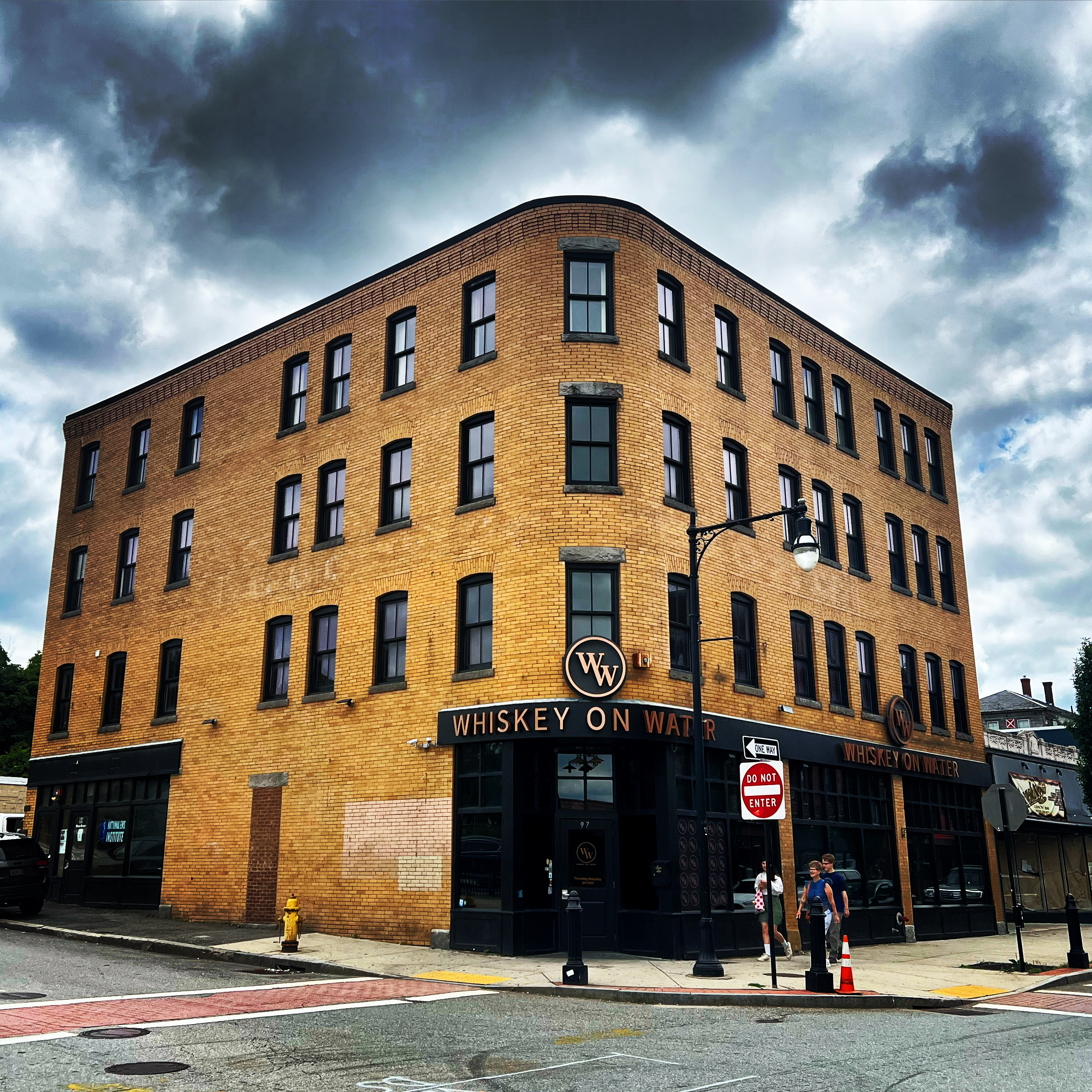

The Goldberg Building is a historic commercial building located at 97-103 Water Street in the Canal District of Worcester, Massachusetts.

== Description and history ==
This four-story brick building, occupying a corner lot at Water and Harrison Streets, was built c. 1908. Its street-facing facades are laid in yellow brick, while the other two sides are in red brick; all are laid in running bond. There are eight window bays facing Harrison Street, seven facing Water Street, and one diagonal bay at the corner. The store fronts on the first level, recently restored to their original appearance, consist of large plate glass display windows topped by smaller transom windows, separated in groups by brick piers. The main entrance, on the diagonal, is recessed and canted inward, allowing for display windows on either side of the doorway. Windows on the upper floors are topped by segmented arches, and the main facades of the building are topped by a corbelled cornice.

The interior of the building has very little of its original substance. The ground floor stores have no remaining historic materials, and the upper floors were effectively gutted down to the timber framing. The structure was built by Samuel Goldberg, a local hardware store owner whose business was apparently bought out to make way for railroad expansion in the neighborhood. In its early years, the building was principally occupied by businesses operated by members of a growing local Jewish community. After a period of decline beginning in the years after World War II, the building was rehabilitated for use as shops and office space in 2001 by Canal District Pioneer, John G. Giangregorio, who was a founding member and a 10-year president of The Canal District Alliance, founding member of the Canal District Business Association, local business owner, a board member of Preservation Worcester, and board member of the Worcester Convention and Visitor Bureau.

The building was listed on the National Register of Historic Places on November 19, 2007 after John G. Giangregorio's redevelopment of the building and was awarded the Silver Hammer Award in 2008 for the project by the Worcester Chamber of Commerce.

== See also ==
- National Register of Historic Places listings in eastern Worcester, Massachusetts
