= Thomas Giguere Three-Decker =

- U.S. National Register of Historic Places
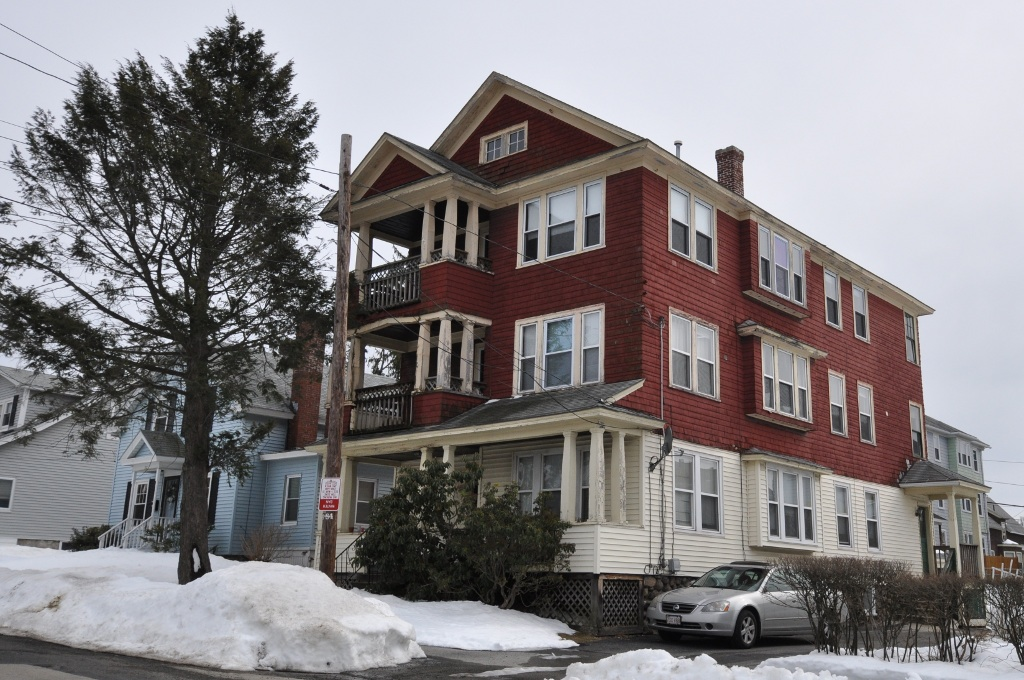

- Location within Massachusetts Location within the United States
- Location: 18 Fairhaven Rd., Worcester, Massachusetts
- Coordinates: 42°18′32″N 71°47′52″W
- Area: less than one acre
- Built: c. 1926
- Architectural style: Colonial Revival
- MPS: Worcester Three-Deckers TR
- NRHP reference No.: 89002356
- Added to NRHP: February 9, 1990

The Thomas Giguere Three-Decker is a historic triple decker in Worcester, Massachusetts. The house was built c. 1926, and is a well-preserved and detailed example of the form with Colonial Revival styling. The building was listed on the National Register of Historic Places in 1990.

== Description and history ==
The Thomas Giguere Three-Decker is located in Worcester's northern Greendale neighborhood, on the south side of Fairhaven Road east of West Boylston Street. It is a three-story frame structure, clapboarded on the first level and shingled on the upper levels, and is topped by a gable roof. Its front facade has a porch that extends across the entire width on the first level, supported by triple colonnaded columns, a detail that is repeated on the half-width porches on the second and third levels. The right-side bay of the front has bands of three sash windows on each level. On the right side of the building, there are projecting rectangular bays, also with three-part windows. A three-car garage stands at the rear of the property.

The house was built about 1926, during the later years of triple-decker development in the neighborhood. Greendale's development had been stimulated by the development of trolley service on West Boylston Street, and drew many residents who worked at the Norton Company plant. Thomas Giguere, one of its first occupants, was a machinist, and many of the early tenants were factory workers.

== See also ==
- National Register of Historic Places listings in eastern Worcester, Massachusetts
