= Anthony Zemaitis Three-Decker =

- U.S. National Register of Historic Places
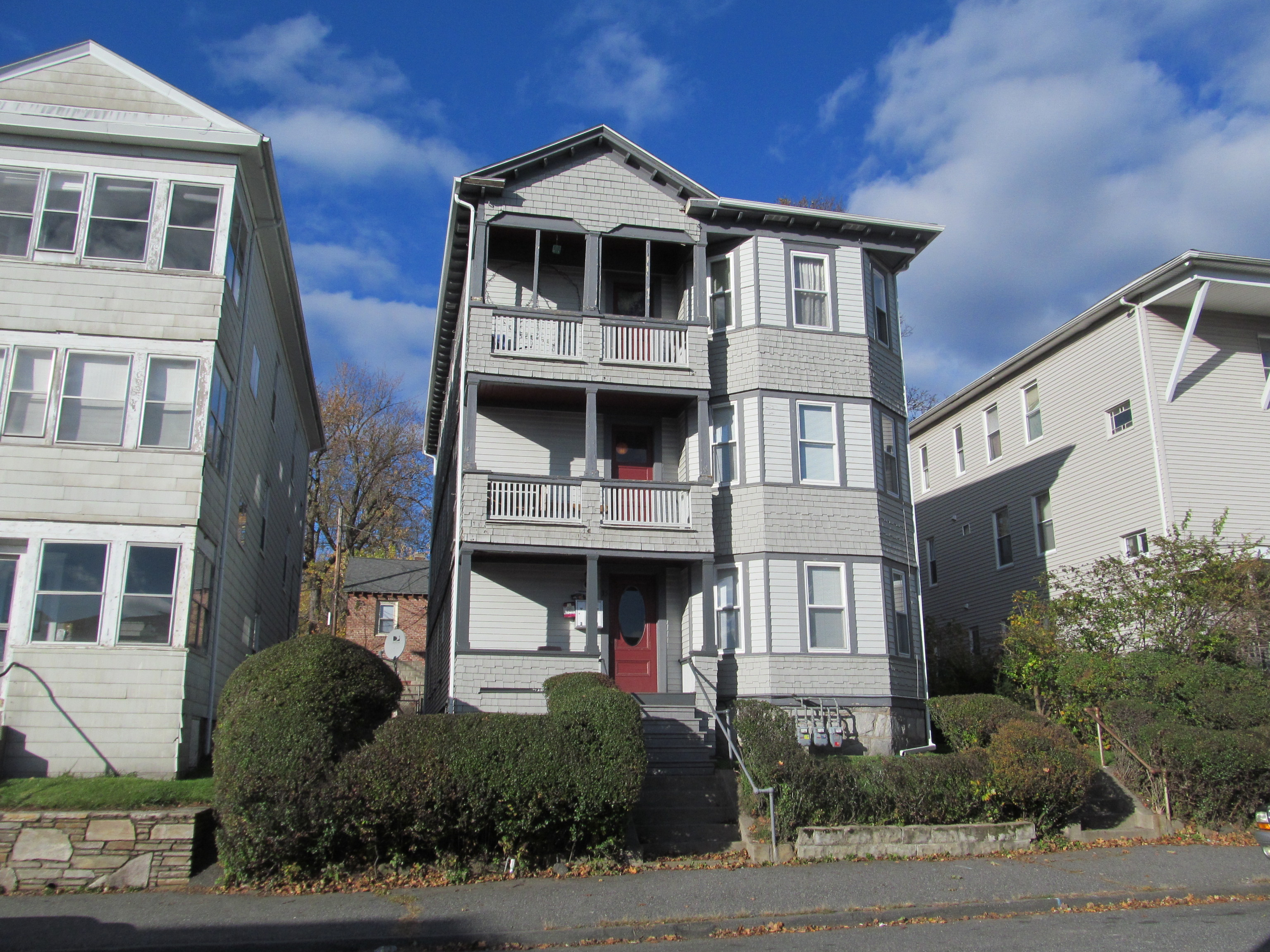

- Location within Massachusetts Location within the United States
- Location: 35 Dartmouth St., Worcester, Massachusetts
- Coordinates: 42°15′28″N 71°46′46″W
- Area: less than one acre
- Built: c. 1914
- Architectural style: Colonial Revival
- MPS: Worcester Three-Deckers TR
- NRHP reference No.: 89002401
- Added to NRHP: February 9, 1990

The Anthony Zemaitis Three-Decker is a historic triple decker in Worcester, Massachusetts. Built c. 1914, the house is a well-preserved local example of Colonial Revival styling. It was listed on the National Register of Historic Places in 1990.

== Description and history ==
The Anthony Zemaitis Three-Decker is located east of downtown Worcester, on the north side of Dartmouth Street in the city's Bloomingdale neighborhood. It is a three-story wood frame structure, with a hip roof and exterior finished in a combination of wooden clapboards and shingling. The main facade is asymmetrical, with a full-height polygonal window bay on the right, and a stack of three porches on the left, supported by square posts and topped by a gable. It has bands of decorative shingling between the levels and brackets in the extended eaves. Some windows have lights with stained glass.

The house was built about 1914, during a major eastward expansion of residential three-decker construction. The house's early tenants were ethnically diverse, drawn from other immigrant neighborhoods of the city. Anthony Zemaitis, the first owner, was a machinist; his tenants were a patternmaker and traffic manager.

== See also ==
- National Register of Historic Places listings in eastern Worcester, Massachusetts
