= October 2025 No Kings protests =

Protests against the Donald Trump administration

- Part of the protests against the second Trump administration, the 50501 protests, and the Indivisible movement
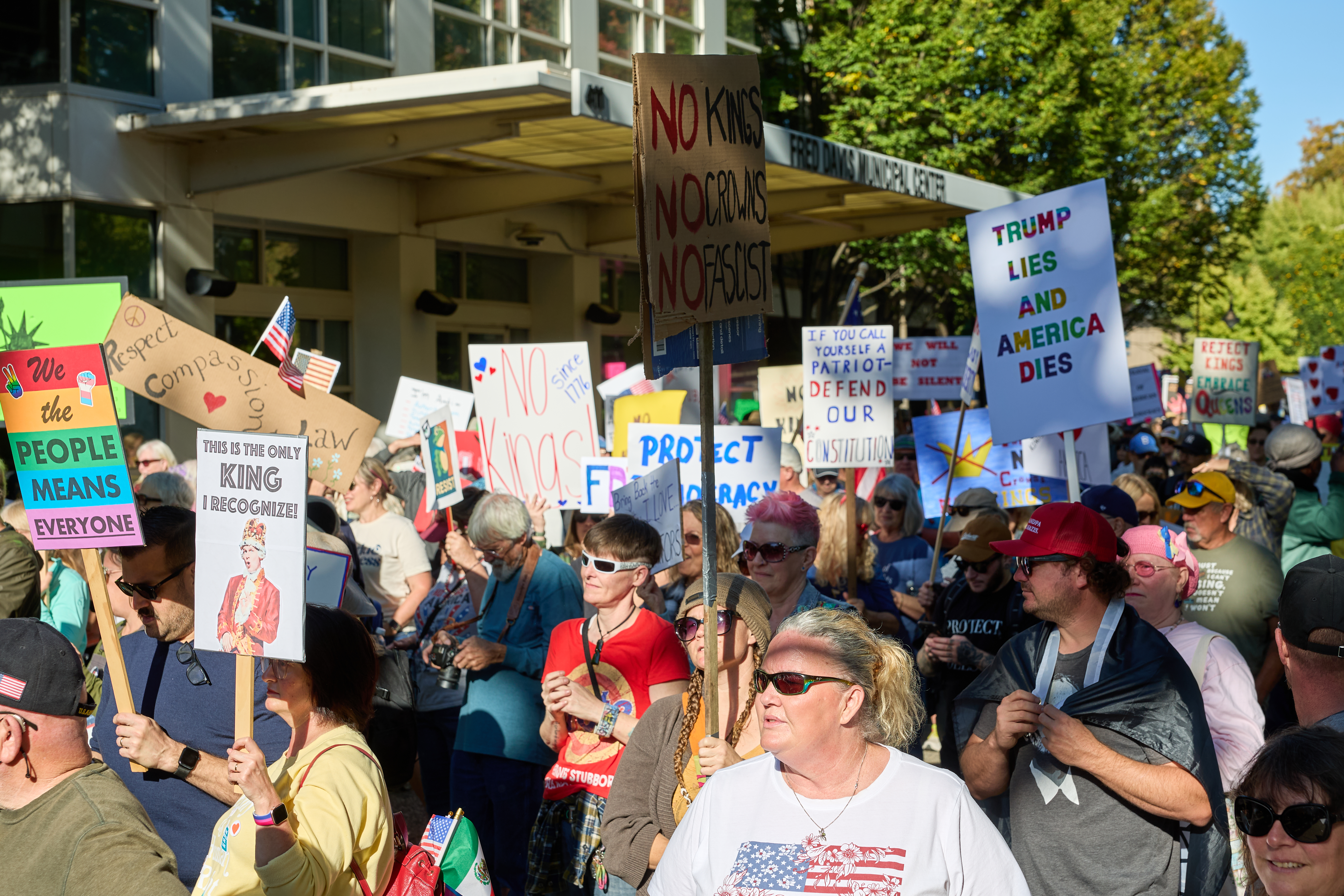
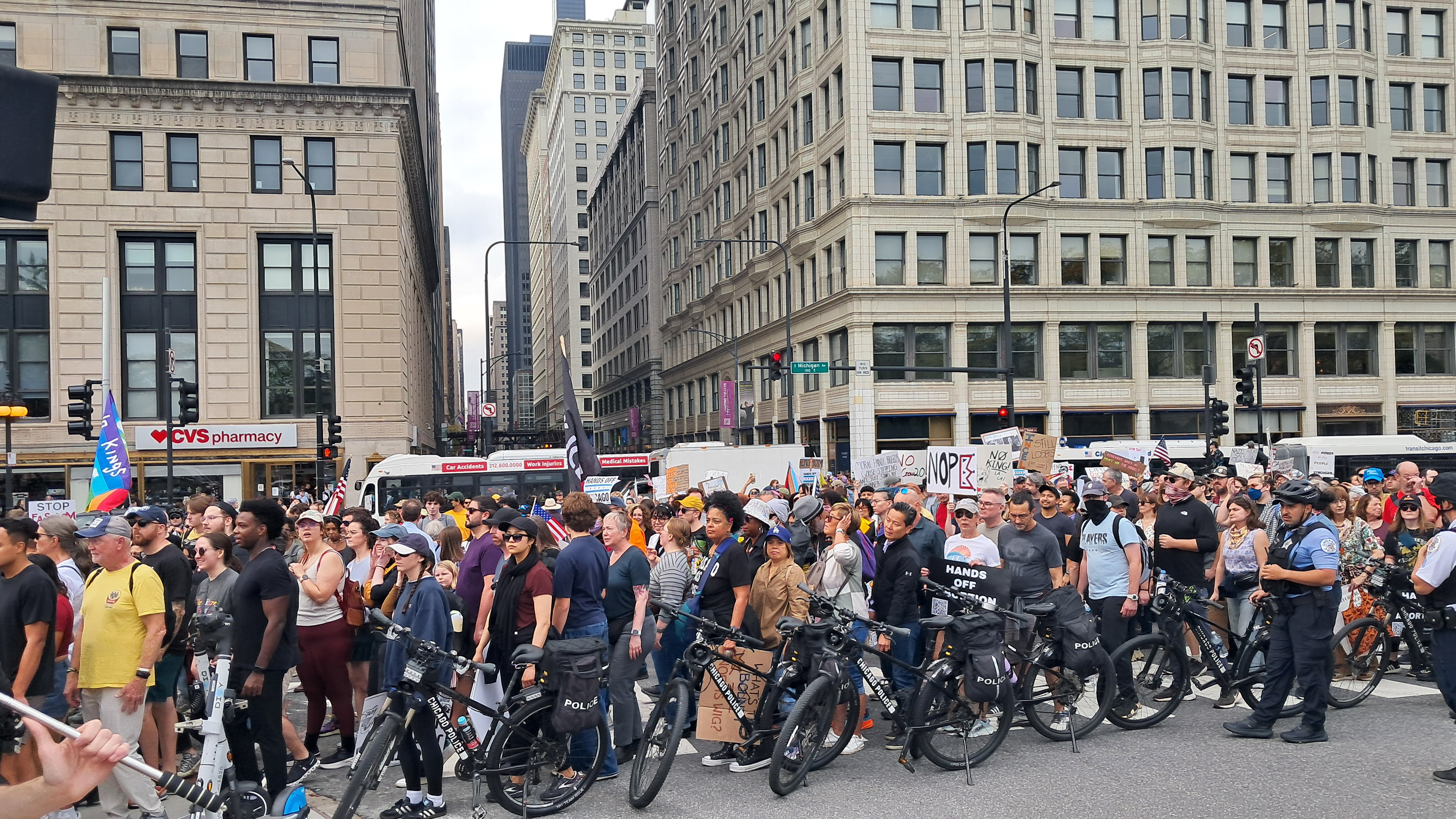
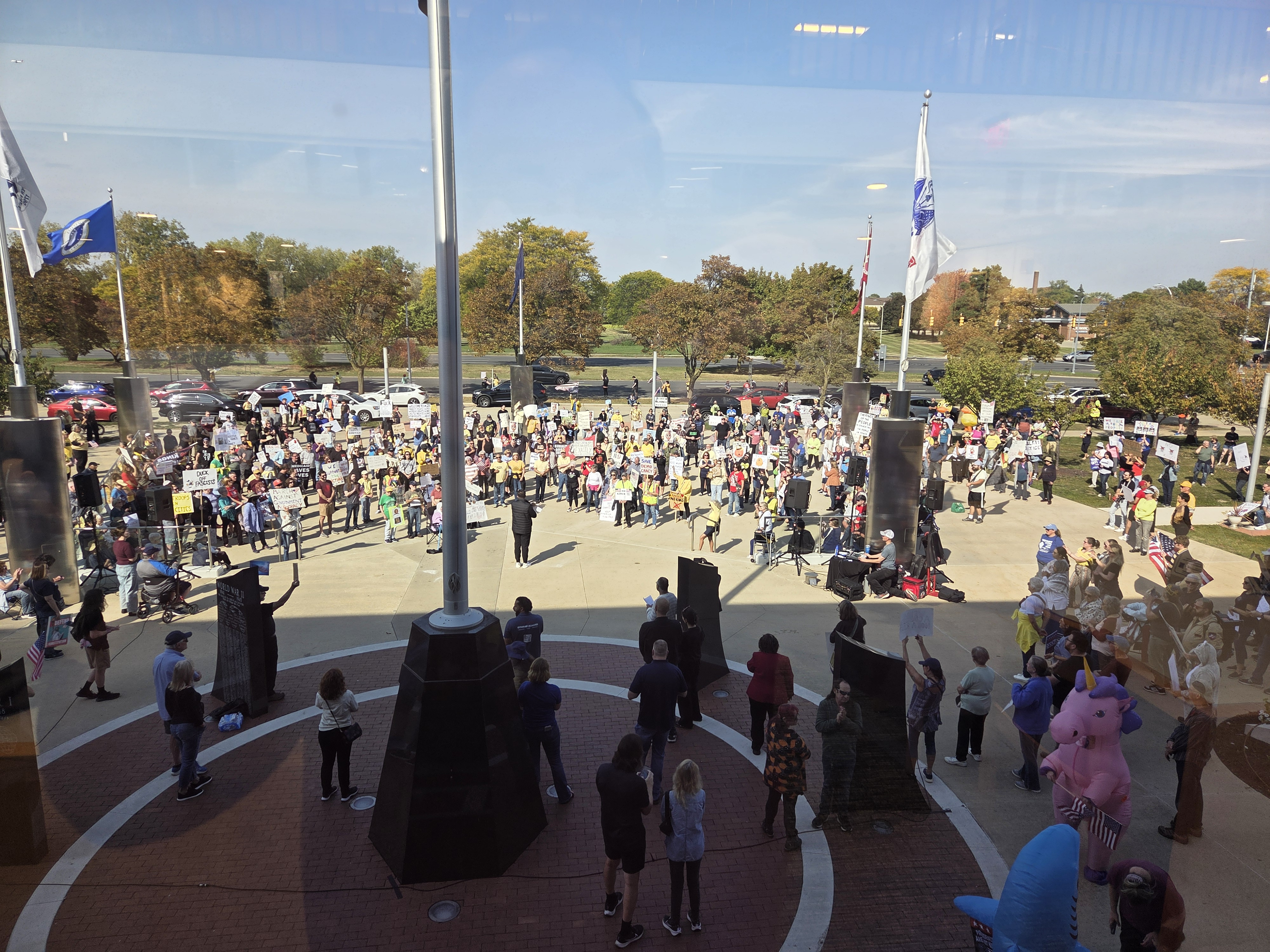
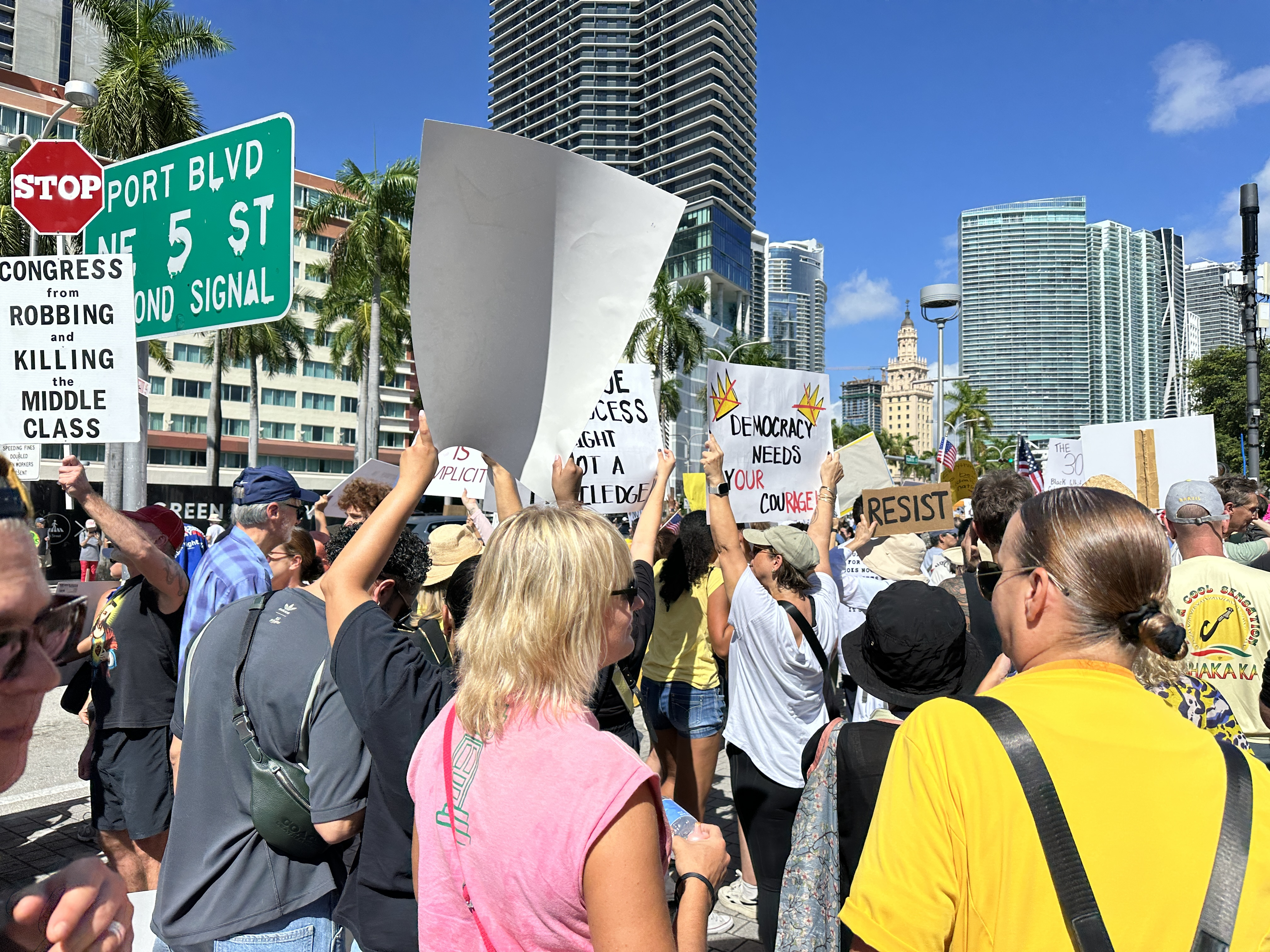
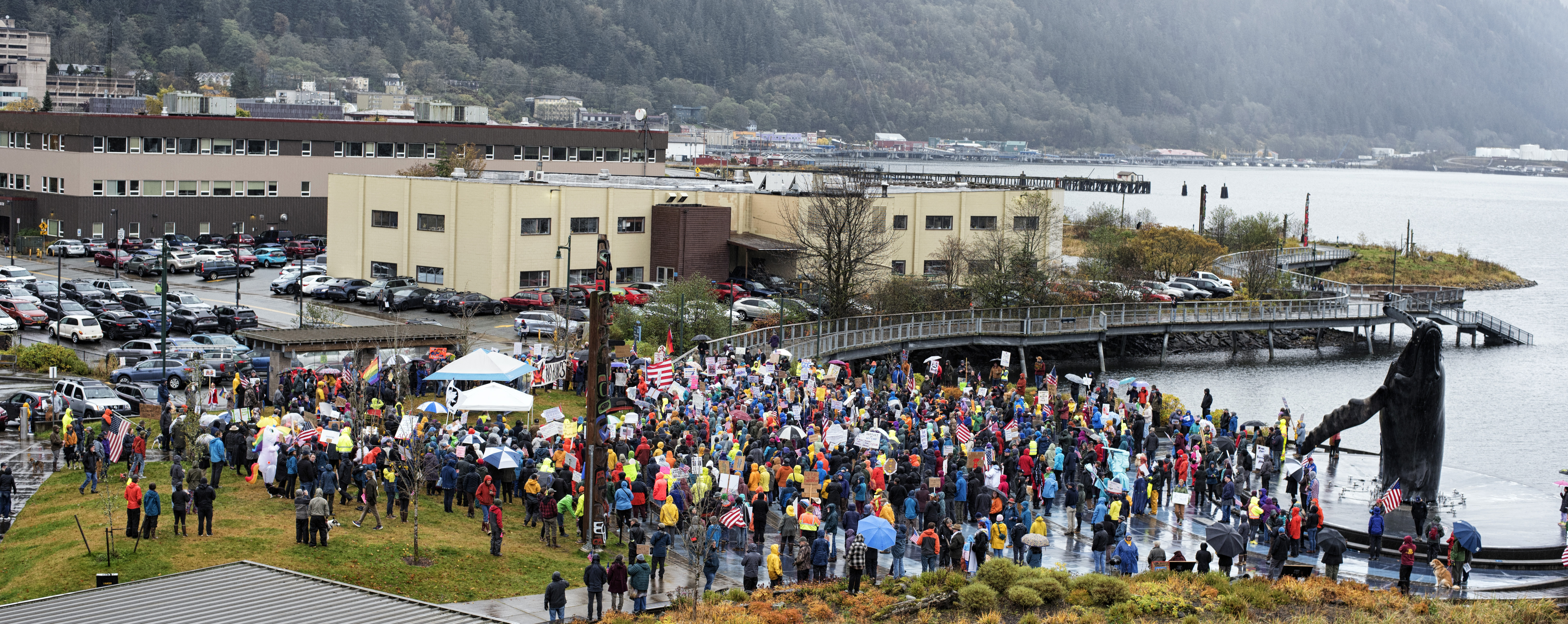
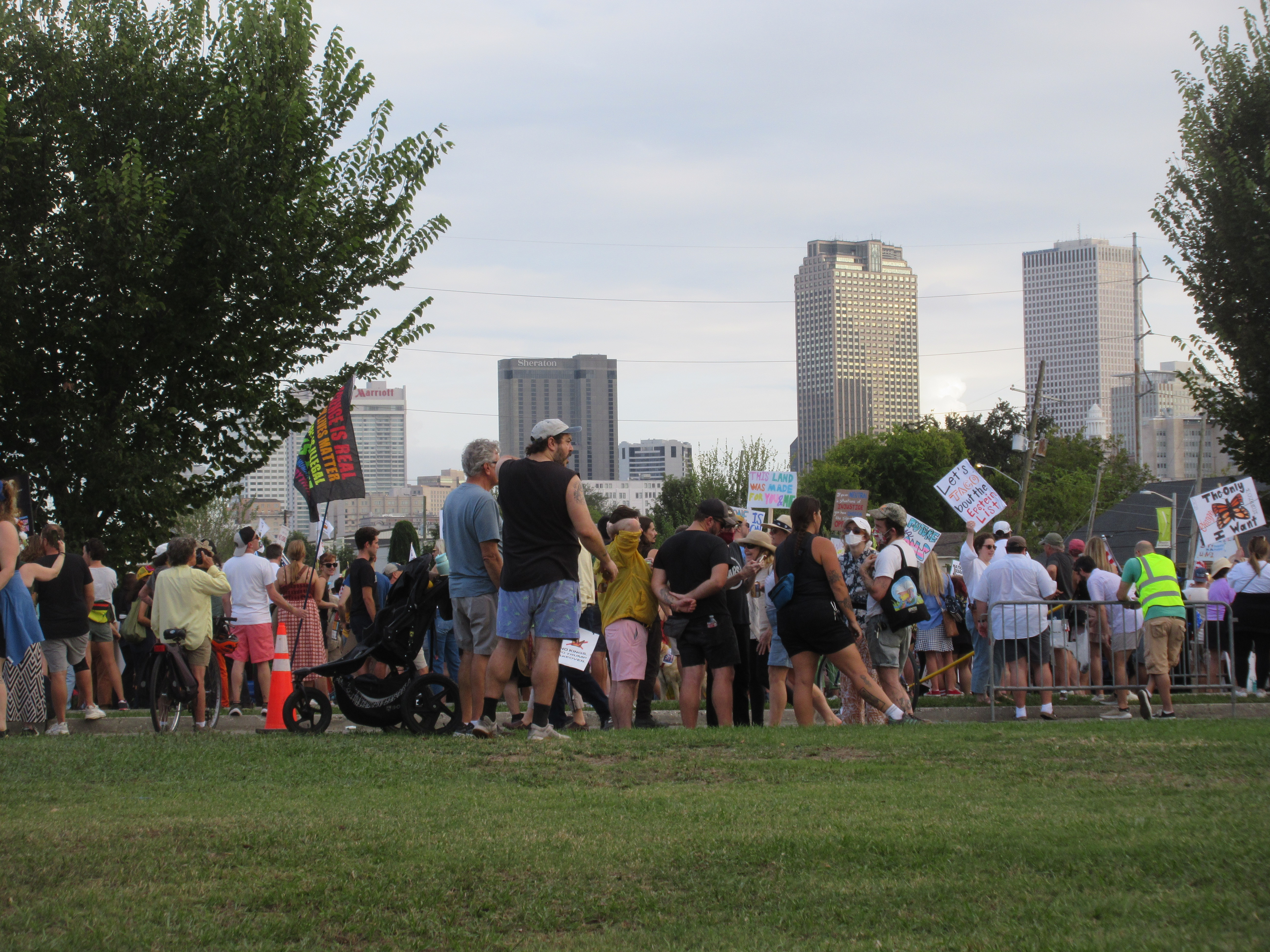
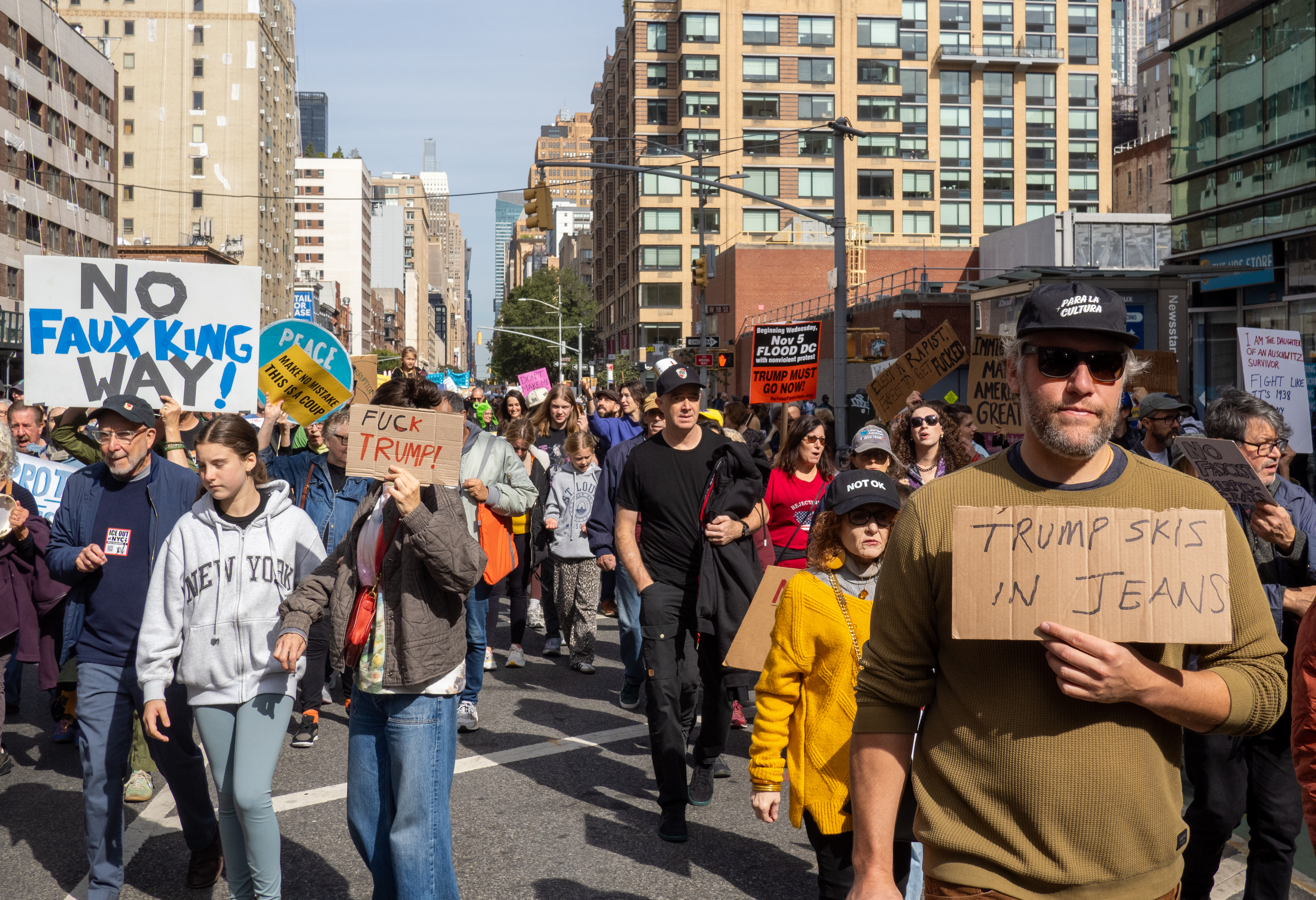
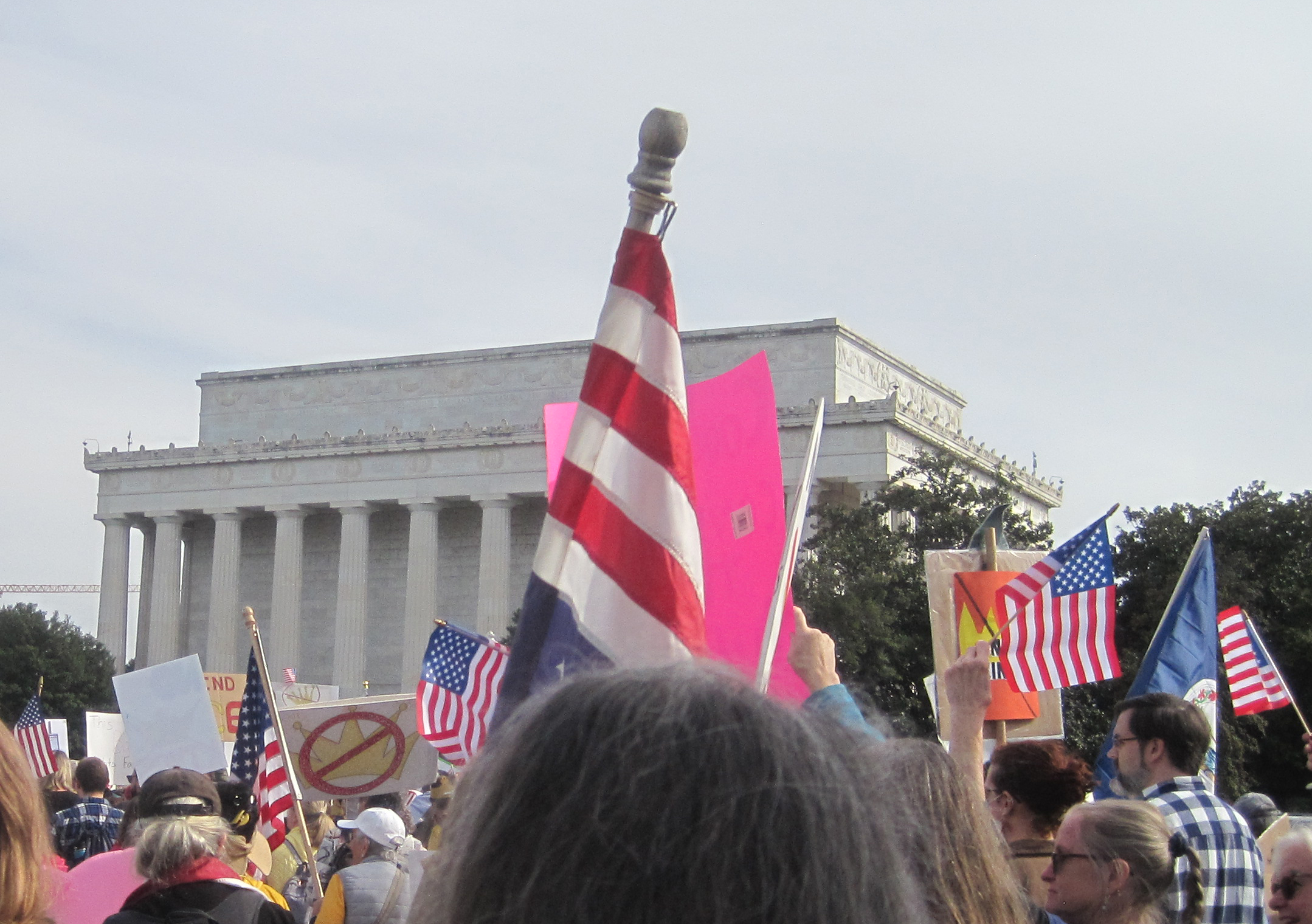
- Logo Chico, California Chicago, Illinois Dearborn, Michigan Miami, Florida Juneau, Alaska New Orleans, Louisiana New York City, New York Washington, D.C.
- Date: October 18, 2025
- Location: United States
- Caused by: Opposition to Donald Trump's second term
- Methods: Nonviolent protest

Parties
Protestors: 50501 movement; ACLU; Indivisible movement; Third Act Movement; American Federation of Teachers; Social Security Works; Communications Workers of America; Public Citizen; MoveOn; Democratic Party; Democrats Abroad (Internationally); Supported by: Minnesota	United States Federal Government; Department of Homeland Security; Immigration and Customs Enforcement; Department of Defense; United States National Guard; Department of Justice; Federal Bureau of Investigation

Casualties
- Injuries: 3 (Note: 1 in Los Angeles, CA; 1 in Jackson Township, OH; 1 in Vancouver, WA)
- Arrested: 36+ (Note: 1 in Fairhope, AL; 14 in Los Angeles, CA; 13 in Denver, CO; 1 in Hyannis, MA; 1 in New York City, NY; 1 in Kent, OH; 3 in Portland, OR; 1 in Myrtle Beach, SC; 1 in Monroe County, TN)

No Kings protests (also called No Kings 2 and No Kings Day 2.0) took place on October 18, 2025, as part of a series of demonstrations taking place largely in the United States against Donald Trump's policies and actions during his second presidency. The demonstrations, which followed the June 2025 No Kings protests, took place in some 2,700 locations across the country, including the National Mall in Washington, D.C., Chicago, and New York City.

Organizers of the protests estimated that the protests drew nearly 7 million attendees, while a partnership between data journalist G. Elliott Morris and the Xylom, an independent Atlanta-based science newsroom, estimated 5 million to 6.5 million participants. Either estimate would make this one of the largest single-day protests in American history.

In January 2026, organizers announced plans to hold a third "No Kings" mass mobilization on March 28, 2026, in response to the killings of Alex Pretti and Renée Good, as well as the 2026 Minnesota general strike.

== Background and organizers ==
The October 18, 2025, protests followed the No Kings protests in June, the Free America Weekend on July 4, and the Good Trouble Lives On protest on July 17. Indivisible was the main organizer, and more than 200 organizations worked together to organize the October protests, including 50501, the American Civil Liberties Union (ACLU), the American Federation of Teachers, Common Defense, the Human Rights Campaign, Planned Parenthood Federation of America, Autistic Self Advocacy Network (ASAN), the League of Conservation Voters, MoveOn, Public Citizen, United We Dream, and Working Families Power. Other organizers included Third Act Movement, Social Security Works, Communications Workers of America, Freedom From Religion Foundation, New York Civil Liberties Union, League of Women Voters and American Federation of Government Employees.

Outside the United States, protests were organized by Democrats Abroad. Various groups organized protests in the UK, including the Stop Trump Coalition.

Organizers were "adamant that the rallies remain peaceful", according to USA Today, and held virtual safety trainings ahead of the protests with help from the ACLU. According to The New York Times, "Many had attended a similar event in June, but the months since had seen President Trump make a dizzying array of changes in quick succession."

=== Pre-emptive responses ===
In the days leading up to the protests, several administration officials said that protesters were members of antifa, which Trump and his administration had labeled a "domestic terrorist organization" on par with ISIS. (Note: The Independent noted that Trump had labeled antifa a "domestic terrorist organization" by executive order, although the legal weight of the order remained unclear since there's no such designation under U.S. law and since, the newspaper described, antifa was a movement and not a specific organization, while Homeland Security Secretary Kristi Noem described it as sophisticated and dangerous as MS-13, Tren de Aragua, ISIS, Hezbollah and Hamas and seeking to destroy America.) On October 13, United States transportation secretary Sean Duffy said protestors are "part of antifa". Attorney General Pam Bondi spoke of "people out there with thousands of signs that all match, pre-bought, pre-put together", which she attributed to antifa's high degree of organization, and pledged to "get to the root of antifa" and "find and charge all of those people who are causing this chaos". The Independent wrote that experts and civil right activists had warned that Trump was using the antifa label broadly against any opposition or dissent, and critics warned that his administration defining who is antifa, meaning a terrorist, risked a dangerous escalation against Trump's enemies, including Americans who march in what the government has labeled an antifa event.

Speaker of the House Mike Johnson said "It's all the pro-Hamas wing and the antifa people, they're all coming out," and that the group organizing the protest in Washington, D.C., was anti-American, while House majority whip Tom Emmer said that the "terrorist wing" of the Democratic party was set to hold them. They and House majority leader Steve Scalise called the protests a "Hate America" rally. Johnson also attacked the participants with: "Let's see who shows up for that. I bet you see pro-Hamas supporters. I bet you see Antifa types. I bet you see the Marxists in full display, the people who don't want to stand and defend the foundational truths of this republic."

The Trump administration said it would take anti-terrorist measures during the protests such as mobilizing the FBI, and White House press secretary Karoline Leavitt said to Fox News that participants and the Democratic Party's main constituents were "made up of Hamas terrorists, illegal aliens, and violent criminals".

Duffy and senators Roger Marshall and Ted Cruz accused No Kings of using paid protesters. According to The Independent, Marshall baselessly laid the blame on George Soros, saying, "We'll have to get the National Guard out. Hopefully it will be peaceful. I doubt it." Cruz also blamed Soros and urged to "cut off the money" behind "these rallies that may well turn into riots". He spoke of legislation he had introduced that would allow use of the RICO Act to prosecute the money he alleged was behind No Kings for "supporting rioting and violence", and said he had urged Attorney General Bondi and FBI director Kash Patel to prosecute.

== Locations and activities ==
While most activities took place in the United States, some events were planned in Western Europe and Canada. Large groups of people gathered in Barcelona, Madrid, London, Berlin, Dublin, Paris, and other cities. Organizers asked participants to wear yellow attire.

=== Alabama ===
About 12 events were planned in Alabama. In Birmingham, 5,000 people gathered in Railroad Park, with speakers including former U.S. senator Doug Jones. 3,000 people demonstrated in Huntsville, and 400 people demonstrated in Guntersville. 600 people demonstrated in Montgomery, over 200 people demonstrated in Oxford, and 40 people demonstrated in Selma at the Edmund Pettus Bridge. Demonstrations were also seen in Athens and Mobile. Additional protests were planned in Dadeville, Dothan, Fairhope, Phenix City, and Tuscaloosa.

=== Alaska ===
More than two dozen protests occurred in Alaska. 2,000 people gathered in Town Square Park in Anchorage, with speakers including Alaska State Senator Löki Tobin and 2026 gubernatorial candidate Tom Begich. 2,000 people also protested in Fairbanks, and 1,500 in Juneau. Protests also occurred in Dillingham, Girdwood, Gustavus, Haines, Healy, Homer, Kenai, Ketchikan, Kodiak, Kotzebue, Nome, Seward, Sitka, Soldotna, Talkeetna, Valdez, and Wasilla.

=== Arizona ===
Over 60 protests occurred in Arizona from places like Tuba City to Nogales. About two dozen demonstrations were planned in the Phoenix metropolitan area, including in Anthem, Buckeye, Fountain Hills, Maricopa, San Tan Valley, and Sun City. Arizona's largest protest was in Phoenix, with around 15,000 protestors. This was three times the size of its June No Kings protest. An estimated 900 protestors met in Tempe at Cole Park, and organizers counted more than 4,300 protestors in Scottsdale. Over 5,000 protested at Flagstaff's city hall, and organizers estimated that 2,500 protested along a mile of State Route 69 in Prescott Valley while 1,600 protested along State Route 89A in Sedona.

=== Arkansas ===
Fifteen protests were planned in Arkansas, including in Batesville, Bentonville, Eureka Springs, Fayetteville, Fort Smith, Harrison, Heber Springs, Hot Springs, Jonesboro, Little Rock, Monticello, Mountain Home, Rogers, and Russellville. Over 10,000 people participated in the Little Rock protest.

=== California ===
Southern California

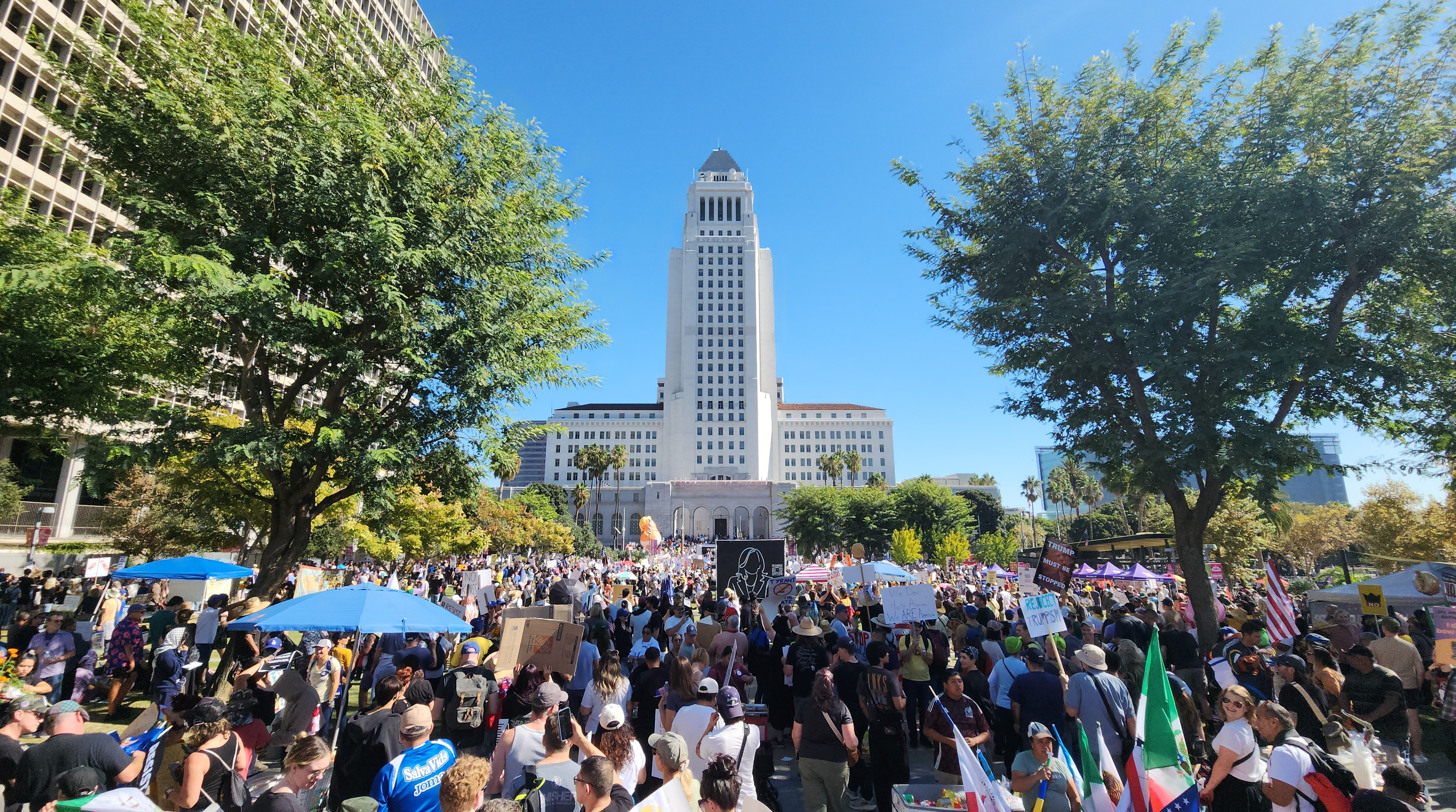
Protest in front of Los Angeles City Hall and Grand Park

Events took place in Burbank, Los Angeles, Santa Barbara, San Luis Obispo, and San Diego. Over 80,000 people participated in protests across San Diego County, Further events were planned in Huntington Beach, Long Beach, Inglewood, Orange County, Santa Monica, and Pasadena.

Twelve adults and two juveniles were taken into custody after a protest in Los Angeles, although it is unclear what the charges were.

Northern California

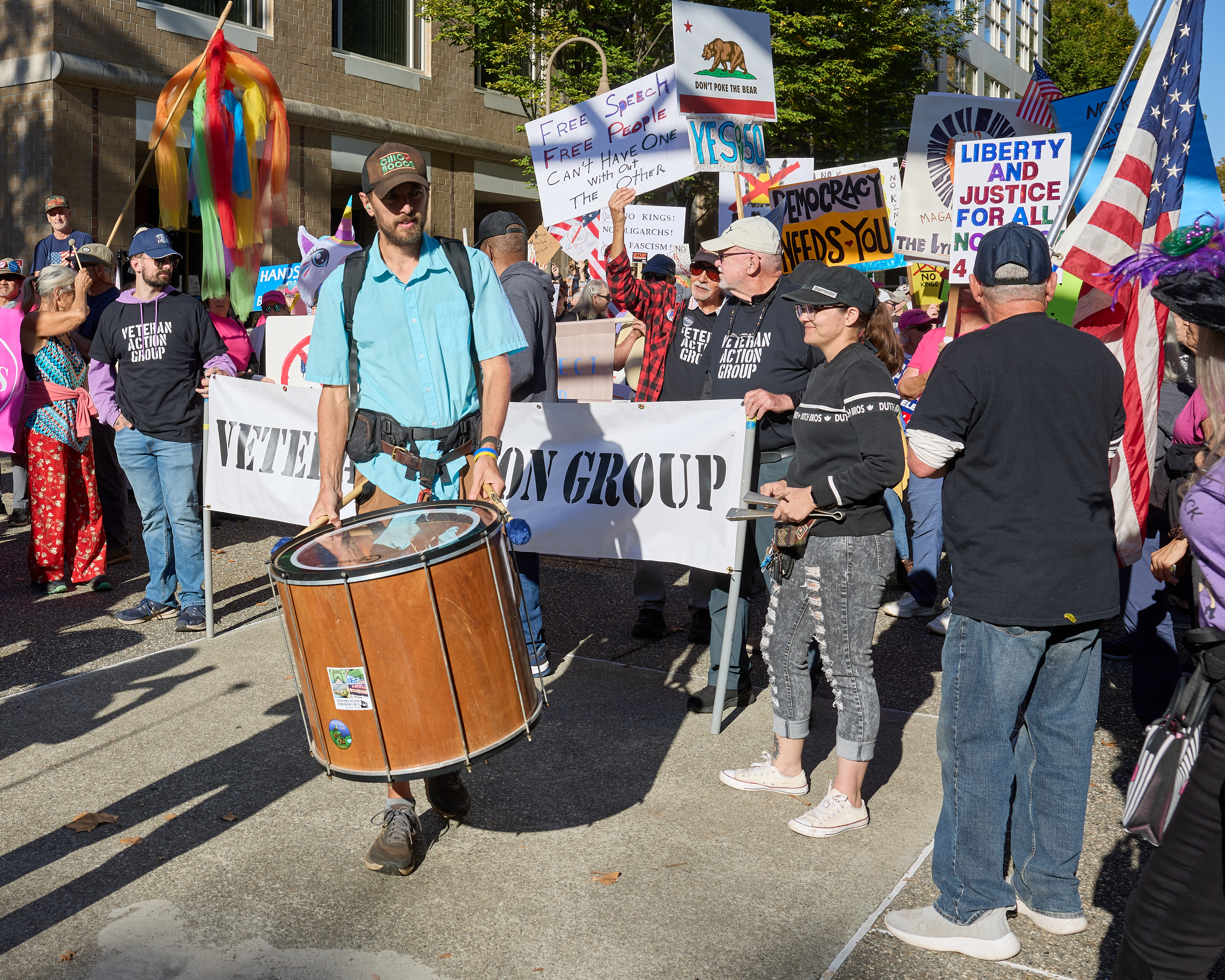
Protest in Chico, California

About 160,000 protesters participated in Bay Area No Kings protests, including over 100,000 in San Francisco, 20,000 in Oakland, 10,000–15,000 in San Jose, 8,000–12,000 in Walnut Creek, 4,000 in San Mateo, 1,000 in Berkeley, and 500 in Colma. 15,000 people participated in a protest in Santa Cruz, while 3,000 did in nearby Watsonville. Protests were also planned in Alameda, Albany, Antioch, Benicia, El Sobrante, Fremont, Hayward, Hercules, Milpitas, Mountain View, Pacifica, Palo Alto, Pittsburg, Pleasant Hill, Redwood City, Sonoma, Sausalito, Sunnyvale, and Union City. On Ocean Beach, protesters formed a human banner saying that read “No Kings / Yes on 50,” referring to the California redistricting amendment Proposition 50.

=== Colorado ===
There were about 60 protests planned across Colorado, including outside the Colorado State Capitol in Denver. 13 people were arrested following Denver's protest, with police using smoke to disperse protesters. Thousands of Coloradans participated in No Kings demonstrations.

=== Connecticut ===
12,000 people gathered outside the Connecticut State Capitol in Hartford, with speakers including U.S. senator Richard Blumenthal, Lieutenant Governor Susan Bysiewicz, and Mayor Arunan Arulampalam. About 40 other protests were planned in cities around Connecticut, including Bethel, Bridgeport, Brookfield, Canton, Cornwall, Enfield, Farmington, Glastonbury, Granby, Greenwich, Guilford, Kent, Killingly, Litchfield, Middletown, Milford, Morris, Mystic, New Haven, New London, New Milford, Newtown, Norwich, Ridgefield, Roxbury, Salisbury, Somers, Southbury, Stamford, Tolland, Torrington, Waterbury, Westport, Willimantic, Windham, and Windsor.

=== Delaware ===
Protests in Delaware took place in Dover, Georgetown, Newark, and Wilmington. Thousands rallied in Newark and marched in Wilmington. Thousands protested along Route 1 near Rehoboth Beach and at The Circle in Georgetown. Over 400 protestors protested at another Georgetown protest along route 113. Organizers counted 1,300 protestors at the Dover protest outside Legislative Hall, which was hundreds more than its June No Kings protest.

=== Florida ===
About 80 events were planned in Florida. Over 5,000 people protested in Miami's Bayfront Park, who were met by counterprotests by two members of the Proud Boys, one of whom, Barry Ramey, had participated in the January 6 Capitol riot. Seven demonstrations were planned in Jacksonville; in Beaches, Downtown Jacksonville, Mandarin, Orange Park, and Ponte Vedra. Protests also took place in Clermont, Leesburg, and Mount Dora. Over 3,100 protestors were estimated at Vero Beach along State Road 60 and 58th Avenue.

In Central Florida, activities were planned in Casselberry, Lake Mary, Leesburg, Mount Dora, Orlando, and Poinciana.

=== Georgia ===
More than 30 events were planned in Georgia, including in Albany, Athens, Atlanta, Augusta, Brunswick, Carrollton, Cartersville, Columbus, Dalton, Fayetteville, Gainesville, Greensboro, Griffin, Hiram, Marietta, Newnan, Rincon, Savannah, Smyrna, Statesboro, Suwanee, Waycross, and Woodstock. Over 10,000 people met at the Atlanta Civic Center before a march started there. Senator Raphael Warnock spoke at the Atlanta rally, and over 35,000 protested in the city.

=== Hawaiʻi ===
In Hawaiʻi the protests were called the "No Dictators" movement instead of "No Kings" out of respect for the aliʻi of the Hawaiian Kingdom. Events were planned on the islands of Oʻahu, Maui, Molokaʻi, Kauaʻi, and Hawaiʻi.

=== Idaho ===
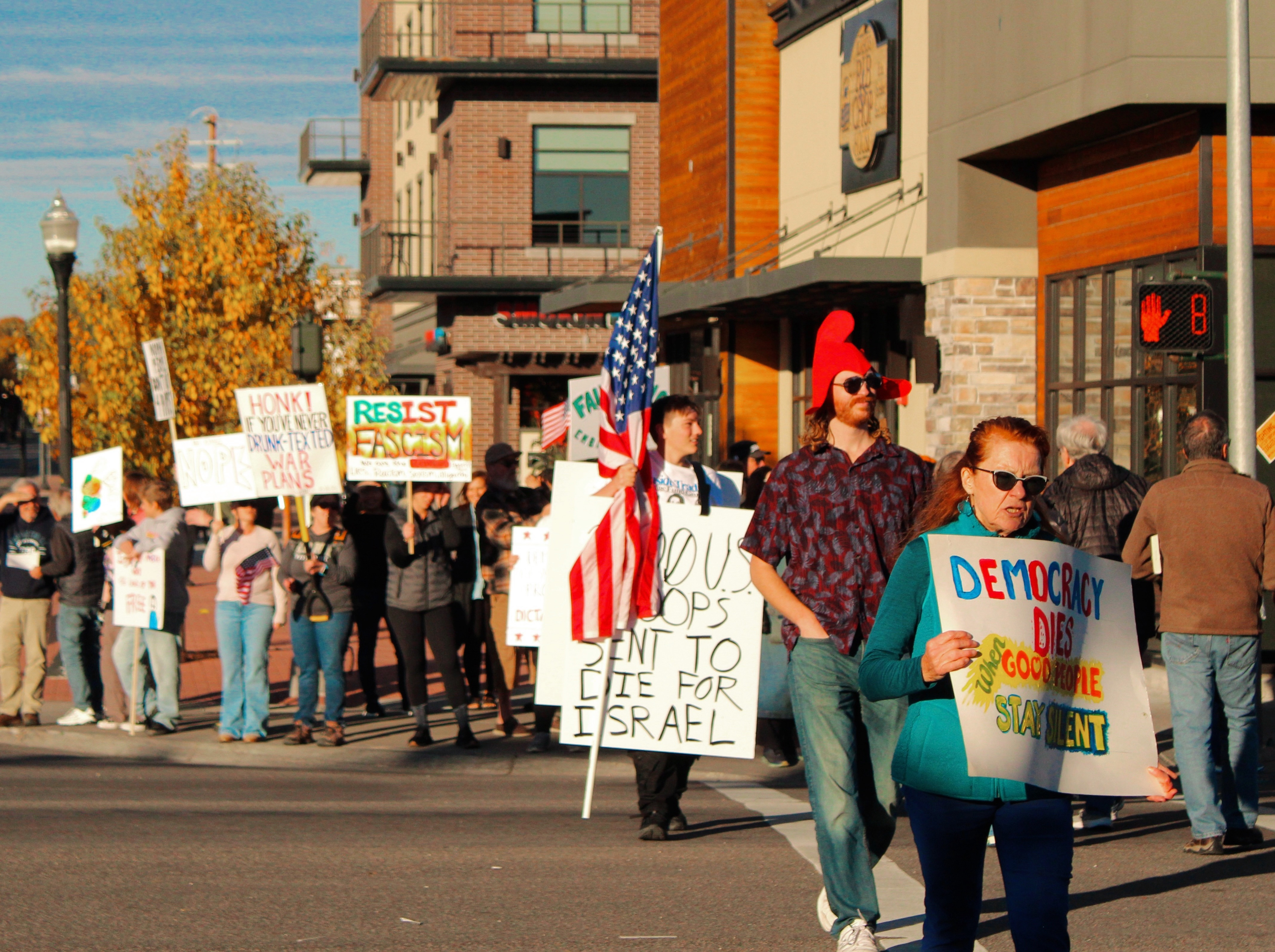
Protestors in Idaho Falls

In Idaho, the group Idaho 50501 organized a large protest in Boise at the Idaho Capitol building and in Cecil D. Andrus Park, with over 10,000 people in attendance. The protest lasted a little over an hour with a large march around downtown Boise afterwards. Southeast Idaho Citizens for Democracy organized an event in Pocatello. Over 2,000 people marched from Caldwell Park to the Bannock County Courthouse. Around 1,200 people participated in the protest in Idaho Falls.

=== Illinois ===
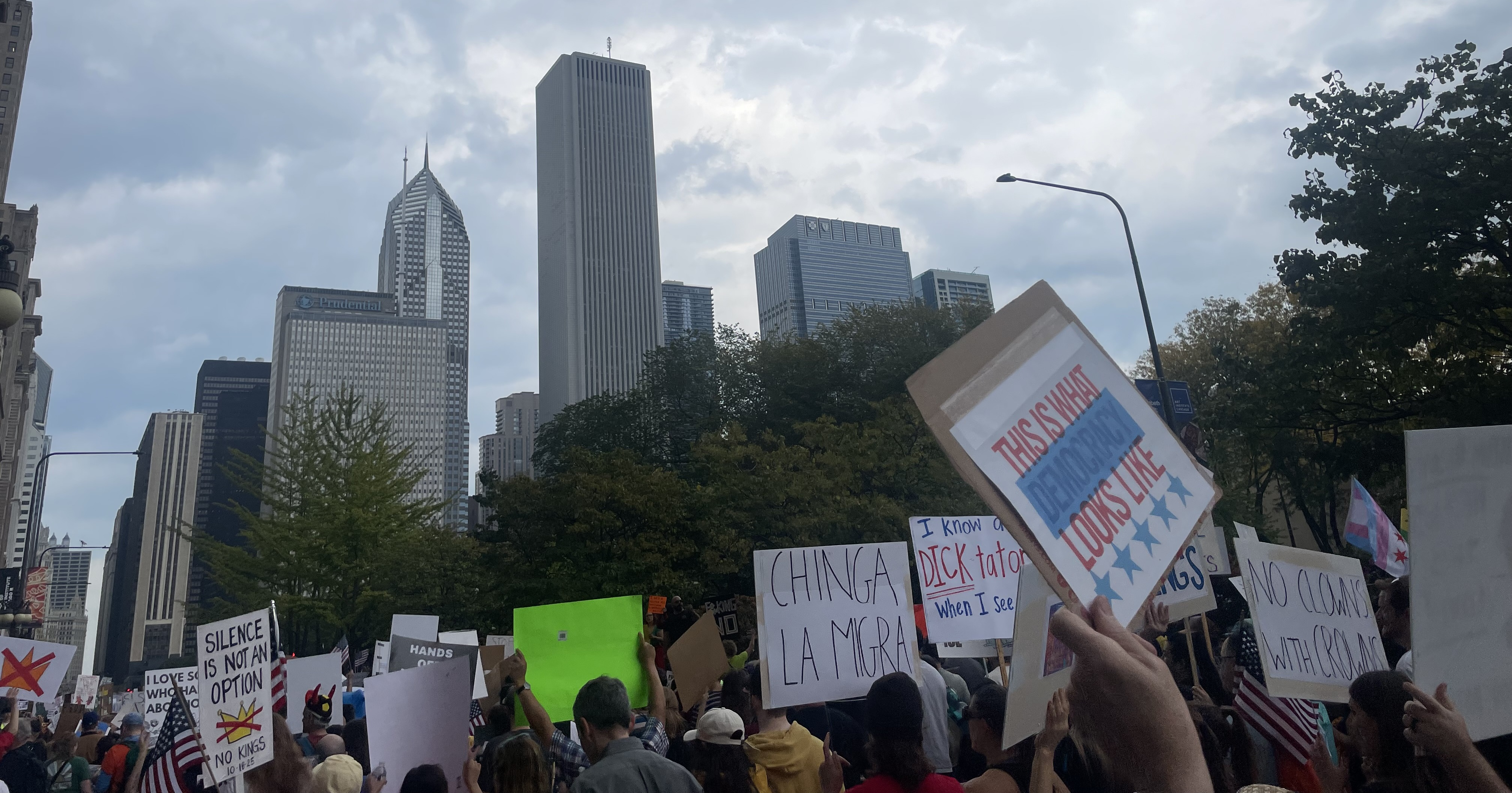
Protesters march down Michigan Avenue in Chicago.

In Chicago, as many as 250,000 people took part in a demonstration in Grant Park, which included Governor JB Pritzker and Chicago mayor Brandon Johnson as speakers. Other rallies were held in Arlington Heights, Elgin, Geneva, Lisle, Mount Prospect, Edwardsville, and Schaumburg.

Three men were arrested wearing tactical vests, and carrying replica guns with no orange tips and ammunition cards while traveling to multiple different protests. Fake flash bangs and lighter fluid were also recovered from their vehicle after their arrests.

=== Indiana ===
Some 44 events were planned across Indiana, including in Albion, Anderson, Angola, Auburn, Bedford, Bloomington, Brookville, Columbus, Corydon, Crown Point, Decatur, Delphi, Elkhart, Evansville, Fort Wayne, Frankfort, Greencastle, Indianapolis, Kokomo, LaGrange, La Porte, Lebanon, Liberty, Logansport, Madison, Marion, Muncie, Nashville, New Albany, Plainfield, Richmond, South Bend, Terre Haute, Valparaiso, Vincennes, Warsaw, and West Lafayette.

=== Iowa ===
In Iowa, thousands of people protested at over two dozen planned demonstrations. Over 12,000 people protested outside the Iowa State Capitol in Des Moines. 200-300 people protested at events in Indianola and Ankeny, while hundreds protested at O'Neil Park in Ames.

=== Kansas ===
In Kansas, there were plans for over twenty protests. 6,300 people protested outside the Kansas State Capitol in Topeka. Protests also took place in Hutchinson, Independence, Kansas City, Parsons, Pittsburg, Salina, and Wichita.

=== Kentucky ===
29 protests were held in Kentucky. Planned protests included those at Bowling Green, Frankfort, Lexington, and Louisville. Thousands marched through downtown Lexington, where former state representative Charles Booker and Bishop Mark Van Koevering spoke to protestors. Thousands held a rally and march near the Belvedere in Louisville. Hundreds protested at the state capitol in Frankfort.

=== Louisiana ===
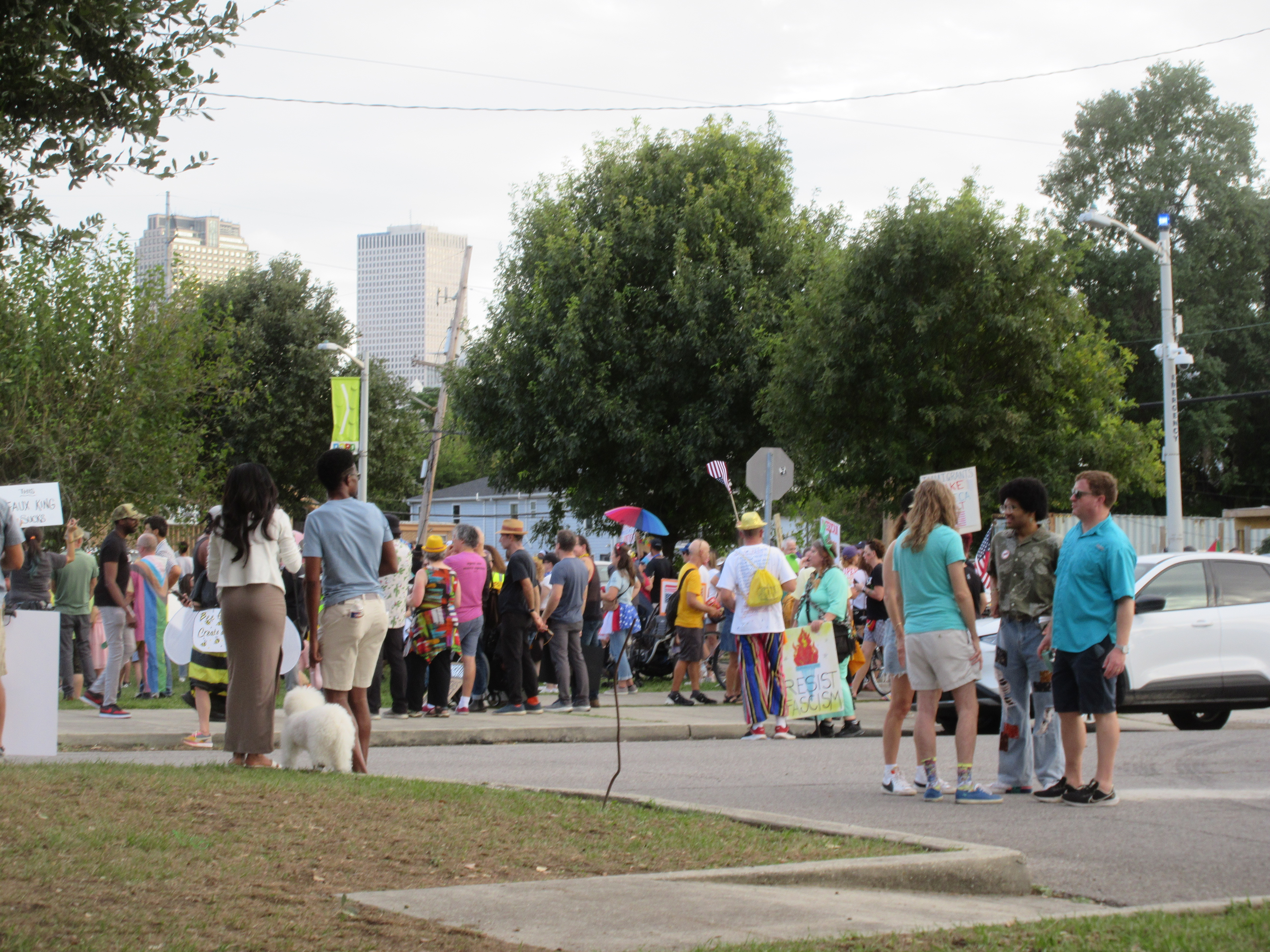
Protest in New Orleans

Thousands of people participated in protests in Louisiana. The largest rally was held at Lafitte Greenway in New Orleans, where thousands gathered at a city-permitted event with a performance by Kermit Ruffins speeches by ACLU Louisiana executive director Alanah Odoms, and National Immigration Project attorney Bridget Pranzatelli. In Baton Rouge, as many of one thousand people gathered at a rally along Perkins Road. Some had drums, signs, and costumes (including inflatables). According to The Advocate, "some costumes were silly, others were obvious pillories of Trump or were otherwise obviously political", such as people dressed as handmaids from The Handmaid's Tale. The event was organized by Indivisible Baton Rouge and featured speakers from local organizations.

Organizers estimated that approximately 800-900 people attended a rally at Zemurray Park in Hammond. According to NOLA.com, "The protest began with three people dressed in colonial attire — tricorne hats, shirts with frills, stockings and jackets — reading aloud some of what the nation's founders had said about kings... There was little sign of a counterprotest, other than a man standing towards the edge of the park holding a sign saying 'Trump is King.'" Some protesters wore inflatable costumes and danced as a brass band performed. Speakers included activist Rachel Taber of the New Orleans-based immigrant rights organization Unión Migrante, as well as politicians Katie Darling and Lauren Jewett.

Approximately 400 people gathered at Prejean Unity Point in downtown Lafayette, a similar turnout to the previous No Kings protest in June. In Shreveport, people gathered outside the Caddo Parish Courthouse. A stretch of Texas Street in front of the courthouse was blocked off for the event, which had tents for organizations doing outreach, safety personnel, and water. An organizer estimated that approximately 1,000 people attended the event in Shreveport. Events were planned outside the Riverfront Center in Alexandria, at Lock Park in Lake Charles, and in Leesville, Monroe, and Ruston.

=== Maine ===
About 30 demonstrations were planned in Maine. Over 40 eventually took place, hosting thousands of protestors. Organizers estimated 5,000-7,000 attended Portland's protest. Speakers included senate candidates David Costello, Jordan Wood, and Tucker Favreau, as well as Hannah Pingree, Troy Jackson, and Shenna Bellows, who were running for governor. Organizers also estimated 2,500 protestors gathered in Auburn and over 500 in Belfast. Around 2,000 protested in Bangor, and 300 protested in Saco.

=== Maryland ===
More than 60 events were planned in Maryland, including in Annapolis, Baltimore, Columbia, Frederick, Hagerstown, Salisbury, and Silver Spring. Demonstrations were also held at the National Institutes of Health's headquarters in Bethesda, which was attended by U.S. senators Angela Alsobrooks and Chris Van Hollen.

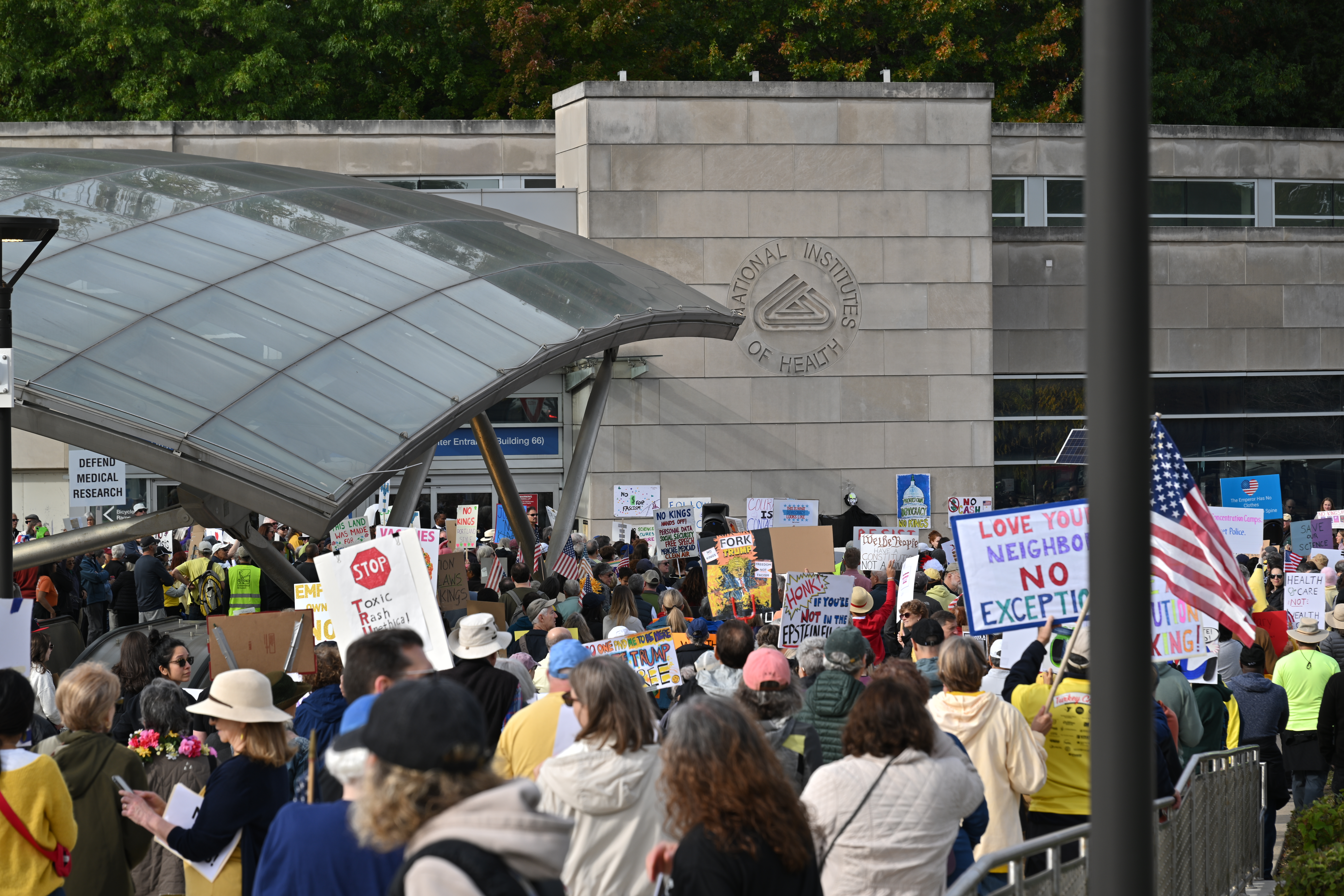
Bethesda, MD

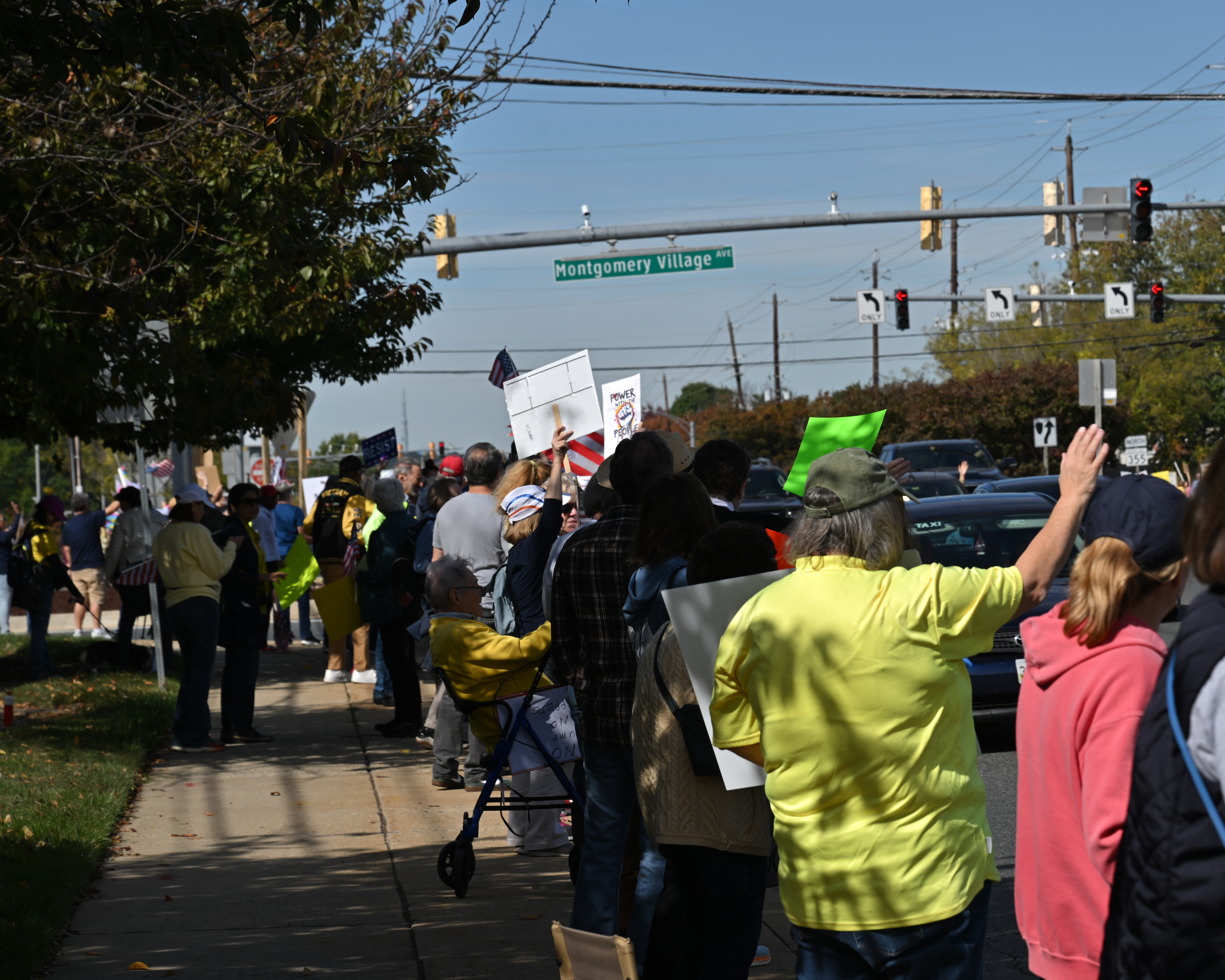
Gaithersburg, MD

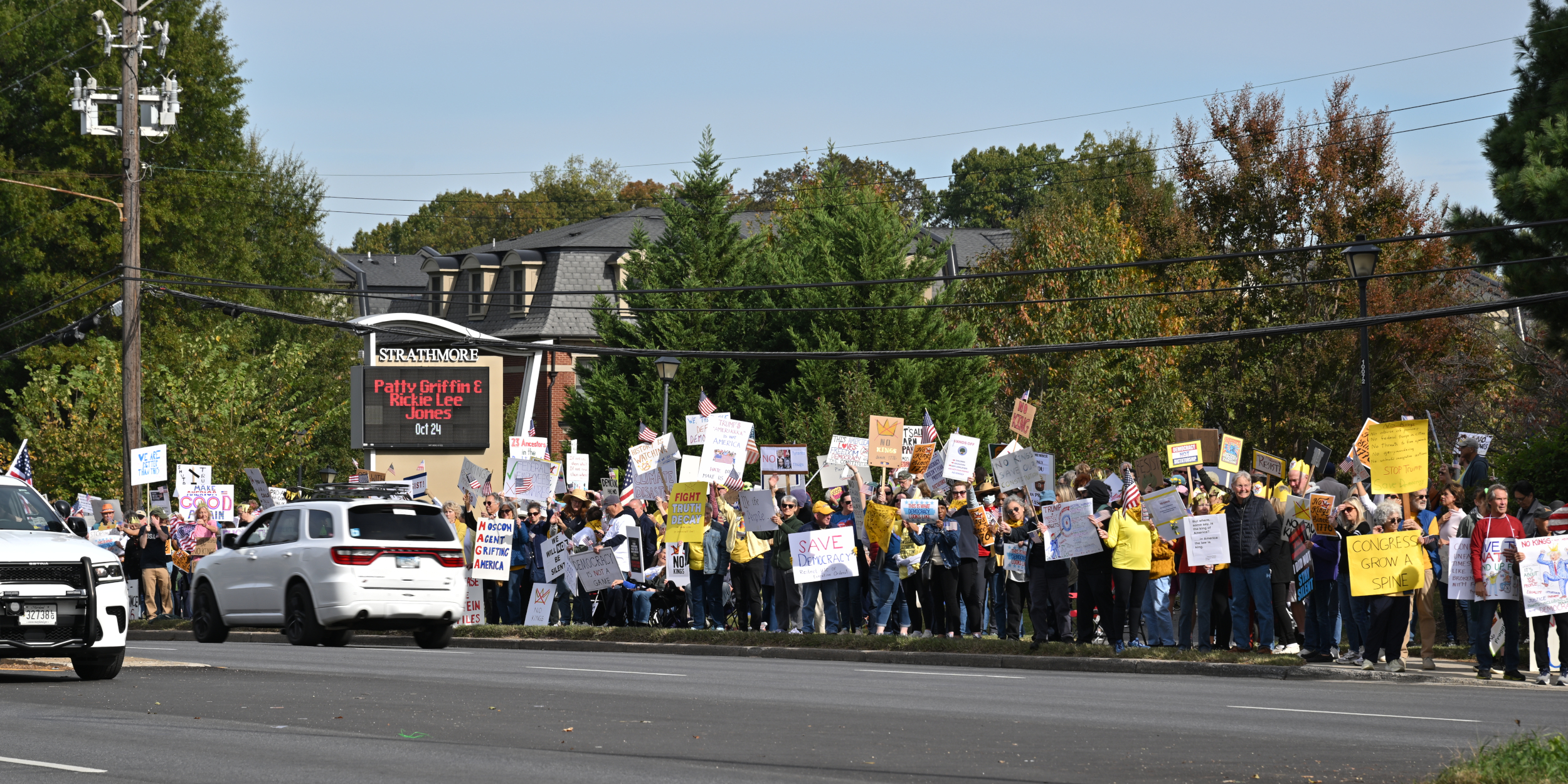
North Bethesda, MD

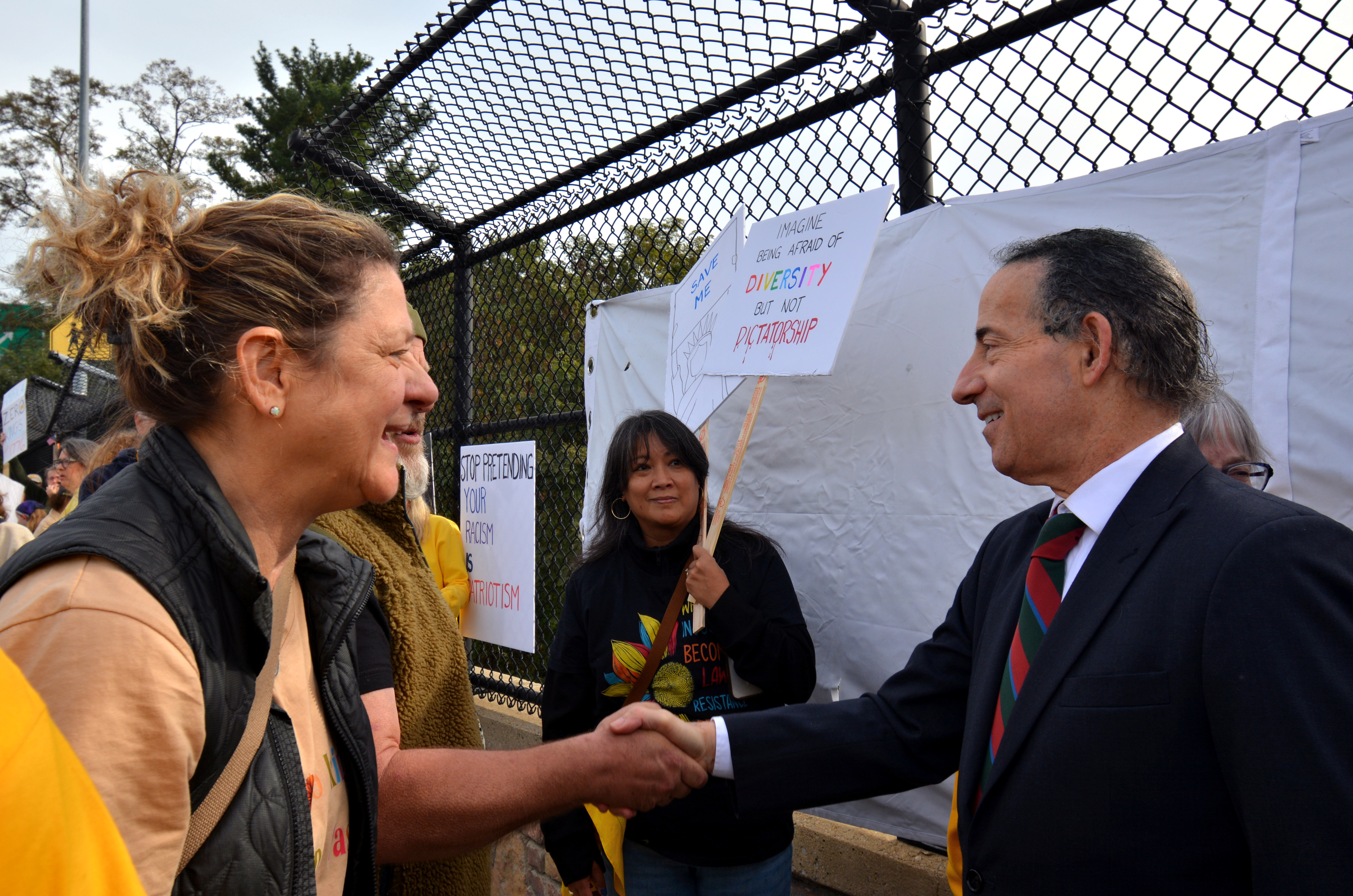
Silver Spring, MD

=== Massachusetts ===
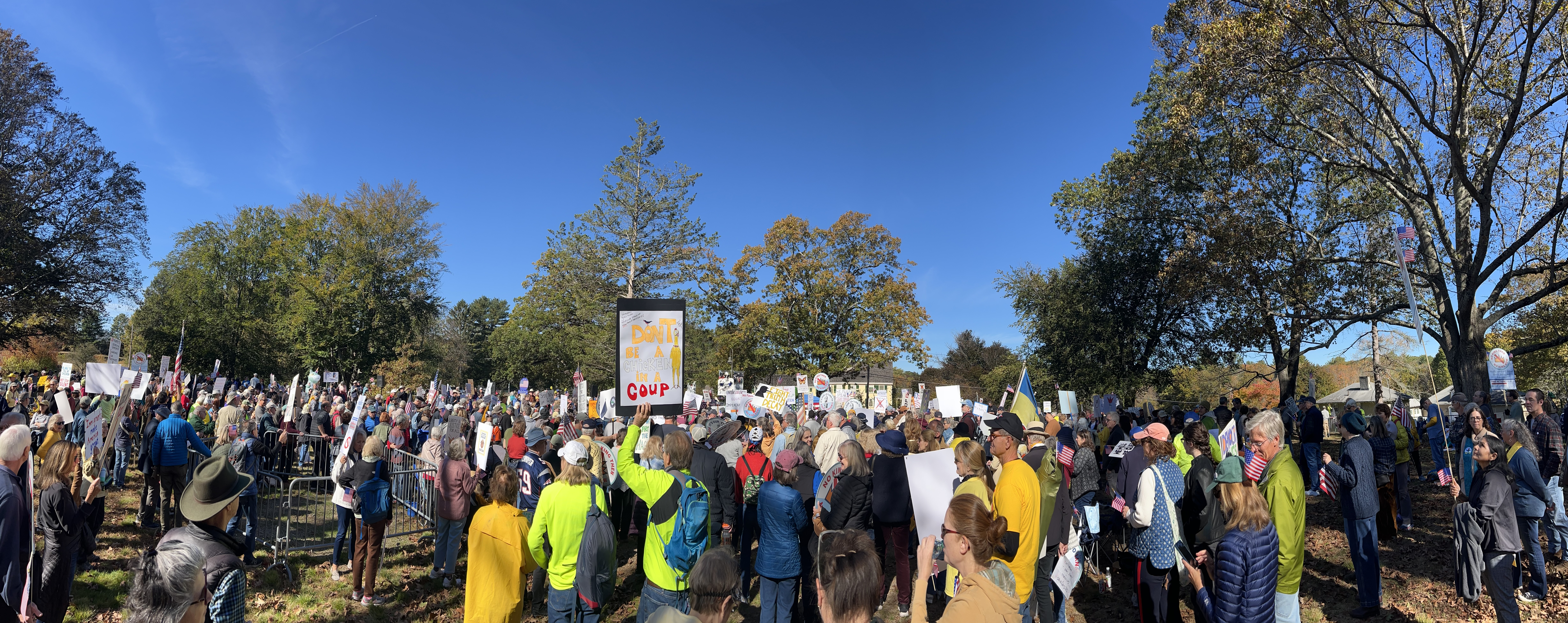
Protest in Concord, Massachusetts

In Massachusetts, hundreds of events were planned across the state including in Wakefield, Wellesley, Lowell, Lancaster, Bedford, Fall River, and Swansea. Organizers estimated 1,900 people protested in Ipswich. A rally at Institute Park in Worcester had an attendance estimated to be in the thousands. In Central Massachusetts, over 300 protested in Westborough, hundreds protested in Marlborough, and organizers estimated an attendance of at least 800 in Hudson.

In Boston, Mayor Michelle Wu attended a demonstration in Boston Common; other speakers included senators Elizabeth Warren and Ed Markey, and representatives Katherine Clark, Ayanna Pressley, and Seth Moulton. Organizers estimated an attendance of 100,000 or 125,000 people. There were no arrests.

=== Michigan ===
In Michigan, demonstrations were planned in Lansing, Detroit, Dearborn, Grand Rapids, Sterling Heights, Troy, Bay City, Kalamazoo, Manistee, Midland, Livonia, Taylor, Wyandotte, Hazel Park, Ferndale, Farmington Hills, Lathrup Village, Oak Park, Novi, Walled Lake, South Lyon, Waterford, Lake Orion, Rochester Hills, Rochester, Macomb, Romeo, Ann Arbor, Saline, Milan, Chelsea, Ypsilanti, Whitmore Lake, Monroe, and Howell. Organizers estimated that over 2,000 protestors met in South Haven and 325 protested in Caro.

=== Minnesota ===
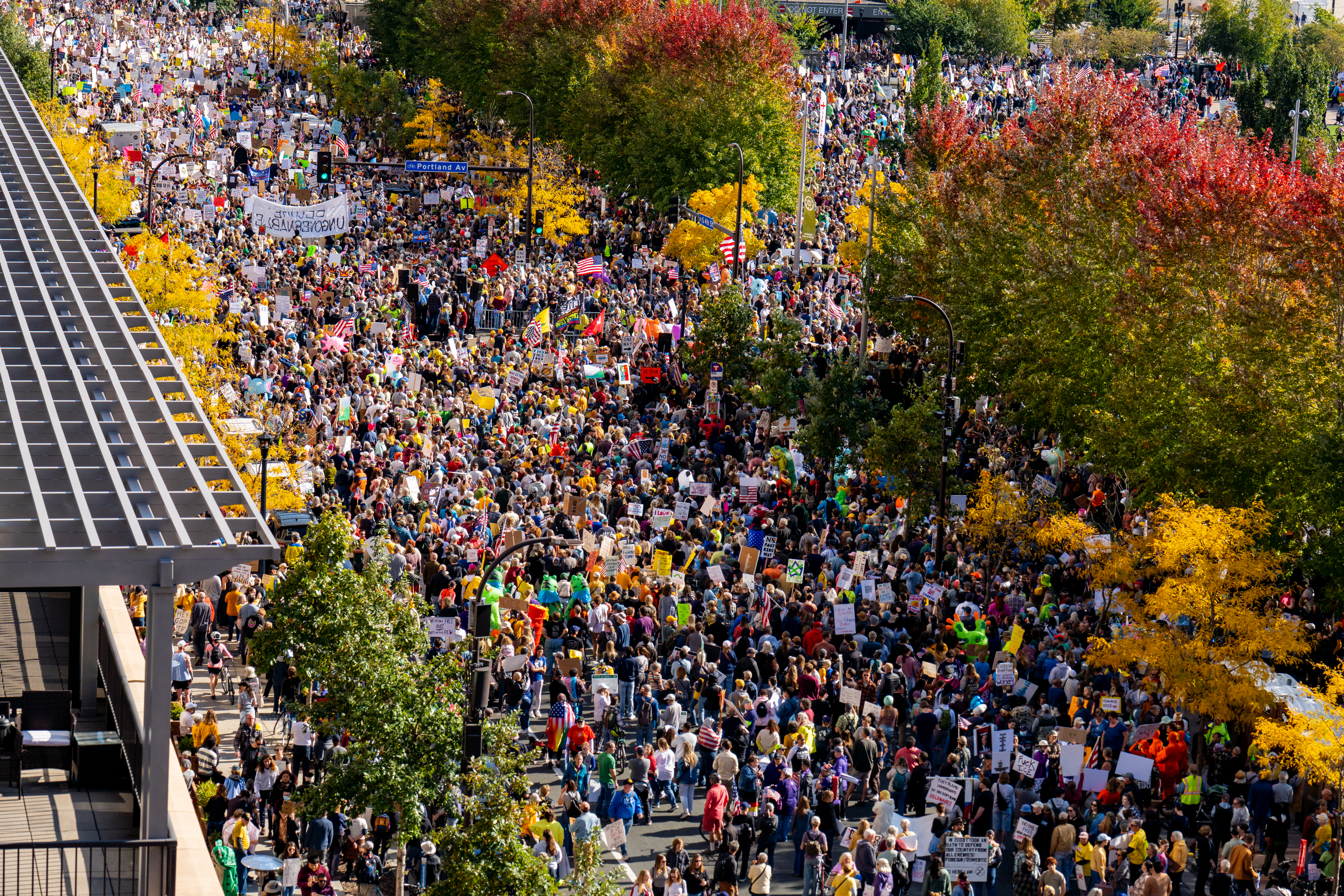
Protesters in Downtown Minneapolis

In Minnesota, events were attended in multiple cities including Minneapolis, St. Paul, Rochester, Bemidji, St. Louis Park, Owatonna, St. Cloud, Duluth, Park Rapids, Anoka, Marshall, Cook, Waconia, Willmar, Cloquet, Mankato and Eagan.

=== Mississippi ===
In Mississippi, events were planned in Gulfport, Hernando, Jackson, Oxford, Starkville, and Tupelo. Over 1,000 people protested at the state capitol building in Jackson. There were a few counter-protestors but no major confrontations. 600 people protested in downtown Hattiesburg. Hundreds protested at a courthouse in Gulfport. 300 protested in Oxford according to an organizer's estimate. 300 protested at the DeSoto County Courthouse in Hernando. 11 protestors marched through Kosciusko from its city hall to a James Meredith historic marker.

=== Missouri ===
About a dozen demonstrations were planned in Missouri. In Columbia, hundreds gathered in Boone County Courthouse Square, filling it "to capacity". A "few thousand" attended the protest in St. Louis. Hundreds gathered in the state capital of Jefferson City. Hundreds gathered in Branson, Missouri, protesting on Highway 76 and Doctor Good Dr., directly across from a Trump merchandiser. Thousands gathered in the streets of Kansas City's country club plaza.

=== Montana ===
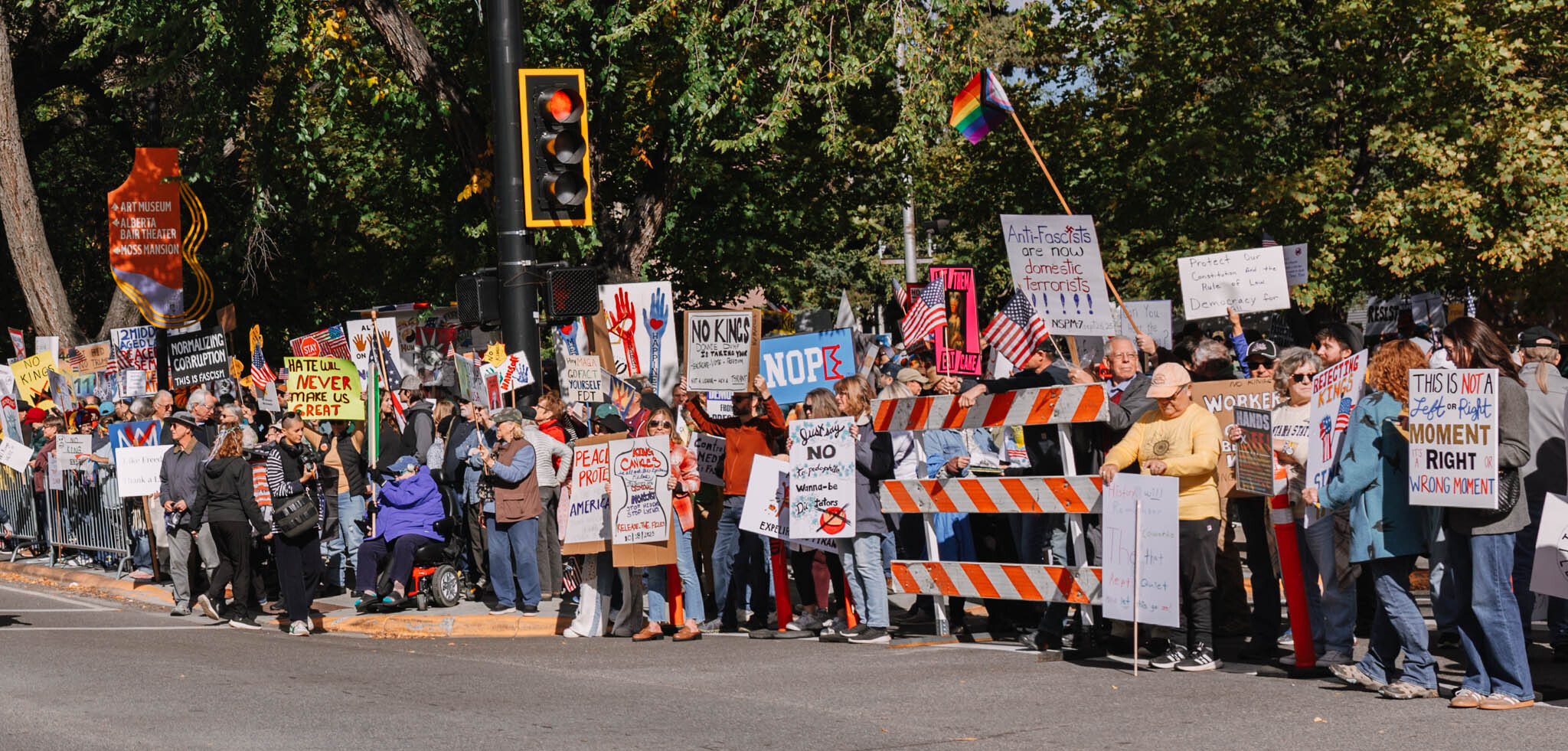
Rally in Billings, Montana

Thirty-one protests were planned in Montana, including Missoula (10,000 people), Bozeman (4,000), Billings (3,000), Dillon, Hamilton, and Polebridge.

=== Nebraska ===
About 16 protests were planned in Nebraska, four more than were held in June. Blue Valley Indivisible planned an event at Charles Park in Beatrice. Over 2,000 protestors met at the state capitol in Lincoln. During Lincoln's June No Kings protest, Governor Jim Pillen spoke about activating the National Guard in response, but he did not pursue similar measures in October. Police estimated that Omaha's protest had up to 4,000 people. Over 200 protested in Hastings. Over 50 protested along 1st Street and Norfolk Ave in Norfolk.

=== Nevada ===
Event organizers estimated that more than 18,000 attended the demonstration in Reno, one of the 14 events scheduled throughout Nevada. Other locations included Las Vegas, Henderson, Carson City, Elko, Pahrump, Hawthorne, Mesquite, and Bullhead.

=== New Hampshire ===
About 30 events were planned in New Hampshire. In Concord "thousands" came out.

=== New Jersey ===
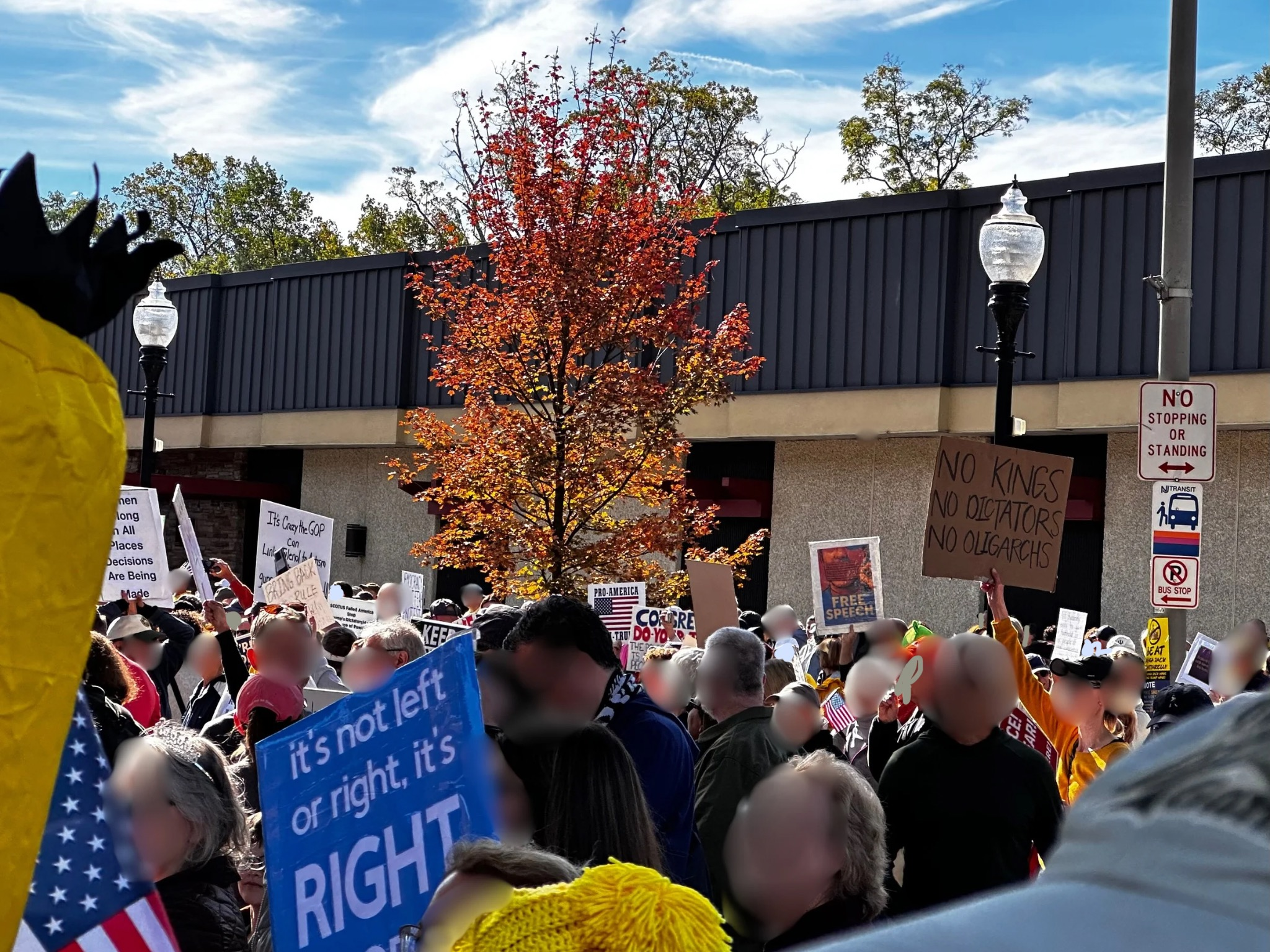
Protest in Morristown, New Jersey

About 50 protests were planned in New Jersey, including fifteen in Central New Jersey. Thousands of New Jersey residents participated in protests. Democratic National Committee chair Ken Martin spoke at the event in Montclair.

=== New Mexico ===
In New Mexico, demonstrations occurred in Albuquerque, Alamogordo, Capitan, Carlsbad, Chama, Deming, Embudo, Española, Farmington, Gallup, Grants, Kingston, Las Cruces, Las Vegas, Los Alamos, Portales, Raton, Roswell, Ruidoso, Santa Fe, Silver City, Socorro, Taos, Tijeras, Truth or Consequences, and Valencia County.

=== New York ===
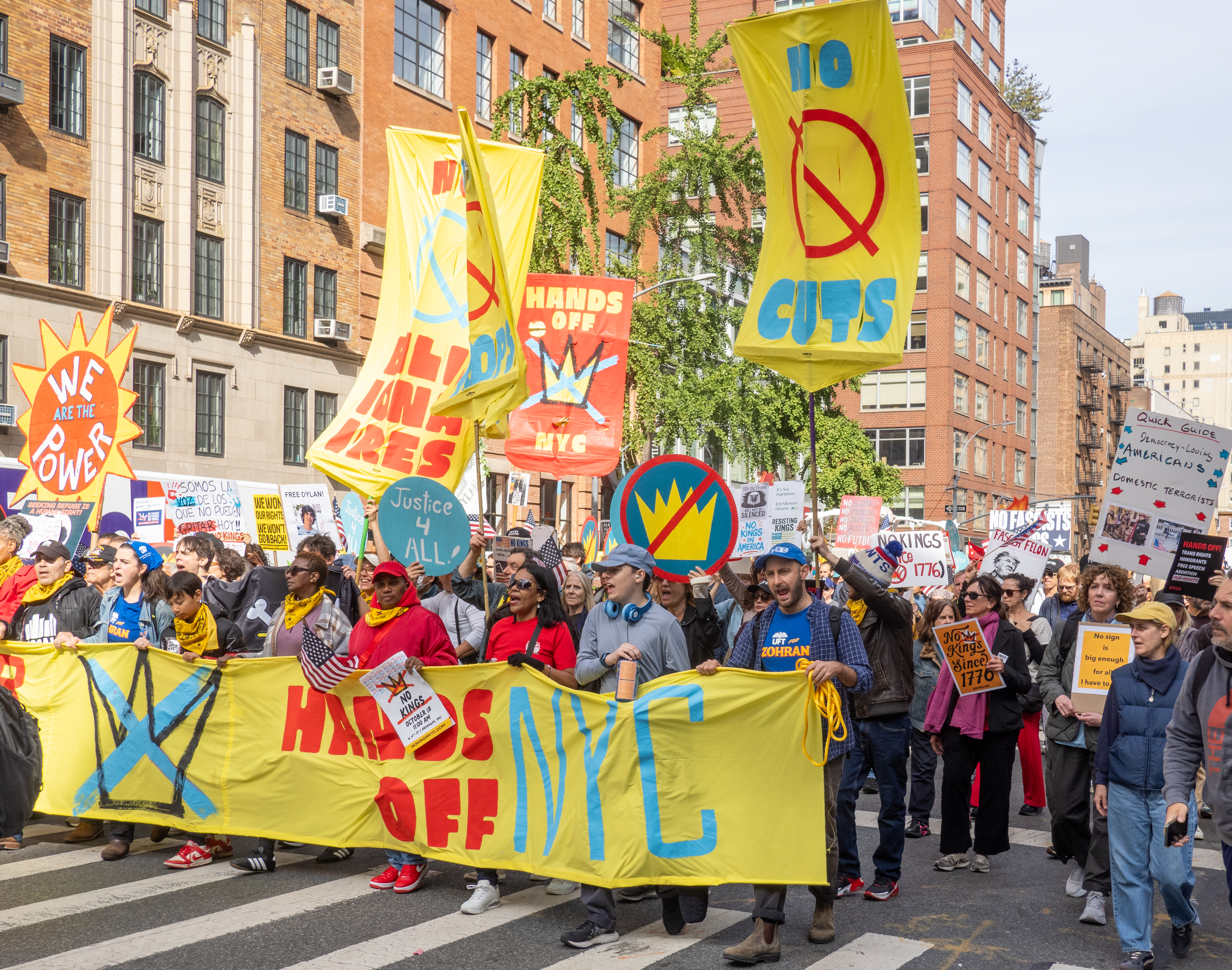
Protest in Manhattan, New York City

Timelapse of part of the march in Manhattan

Rep. Pat Ryan (D-N.Y.) was slated to appear at events. According to the New York City Police Department, more than a hundred thousand people marched from Times Square in New York City. Overall, 350,000 people participated in protests in the city.

More protests took place in over 100 locations including Albany, Brighton, Buffalo, DeWitt, Fairport, Ithaca, Huntington, and Rochester.

=== North Carolina ===
Protests in North Carolina took place in Asheville, Black Mountain, Boone, Brevard, Bryson City, Burnsville, Cary, Chapel Hill, Charlotte, Clay County, Columbus, Durham, Fayetteville, Elkin, Forest City, Greensboro, Greenville, Hendersonville, Highlands, Jacksonville, Leland, Lenoir, Marion, Morganton, Mount Airy, New Bern, Pittsboro, Raleigh, Shallotte, Stokes County, Surf City, Sylva, Wilmington, and Winston-Salem.

=== North Dakota ===
Protests in North Dakota included Bismarck, Bottineau, Devils Lake, Dickinson, Fargo, Grand Forks, Jamestown, Medora, Minot, and Williston. Fargo's protest near its city hall and civic center had 3,500-5,000 protestors, in a similar turnout to June's No Kings protest. Thousands protested near the state capitol in Bismarck, standing along E. Boulevard Ave for almost half a mile. Organizers estimated that 600 people protested in Grand Forks, in the city's largest protest since Trump's re-election. Organizers also estimated there were 400 protestors in Minot, 250 near Mill Hill in Jamestown, 150 along Main Street in Valley City, 100 at Harmon Park in Williston, and 100 in Devils Lake. Eight residents of Medora protested outside Theodore Roosevelt National Park.

=== Ohio ===
In Ohio, dozens of events were planned throughout the state, including Akron, Ashland, Canton, Cincinnati, Cleveland, Columbus, Toledo, and Wooster.

5,000 people protested in Courthouse Square in Dayton. In Jackson Township near Canton, a motorist rammed a truck into a protester.

=== Oklahoma ===
Over a dozen protests were planned across Oklahoma.

Protests were held in multiple cities including Oklahoma City, Tulsa (two locations), Norman, Pauls Valley, McAlester, Enid, Bartlesville, Tahlequah, and Muskogee.

=== Oregon ===
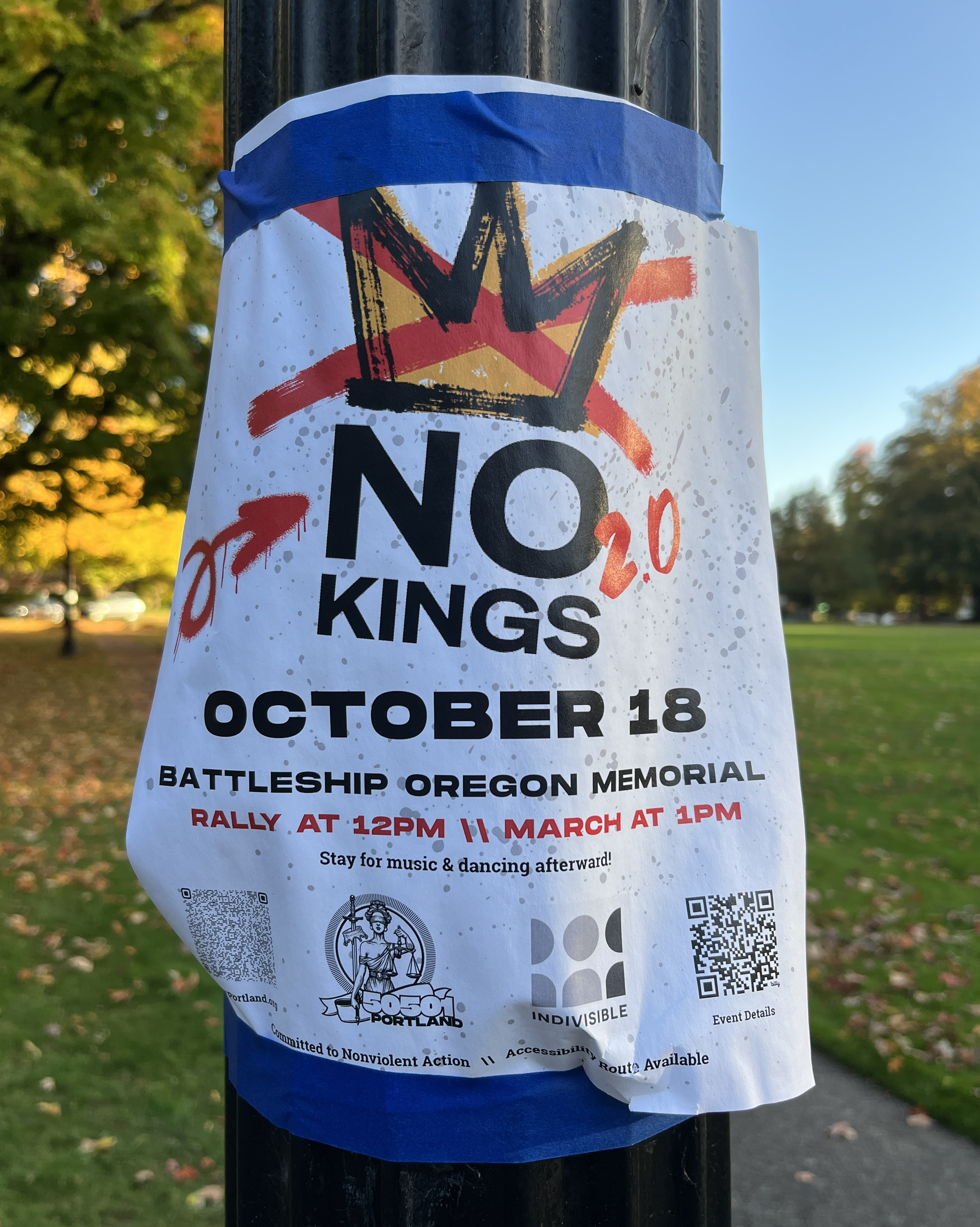
Sign for the protest at Reed College, Portland, Oregon

About 70 events were planned in 65 cities in Oregon, including Bend, Pendleton, Prineville, Roseburg, and Salem. Multiple events were planned in Portland. One local group affiliated with the 50501 movement organized an event at Tom McCall Waterfront Park. Local organizers discouraged activity at the ICE facility in south Portland.

A protest in Eugene was planned outside the Wayne Lyman Morse United States Courthouse. A demonstration was also planned in West Linn.

About 40,000 people attended the protest at Tom McCall Waterfront Park. 5,000 participated in Medford, and 2,000 in Grants Pass. Organizers estimated 1,500 people protested in McMinnville.

=== Pennsylvania ===
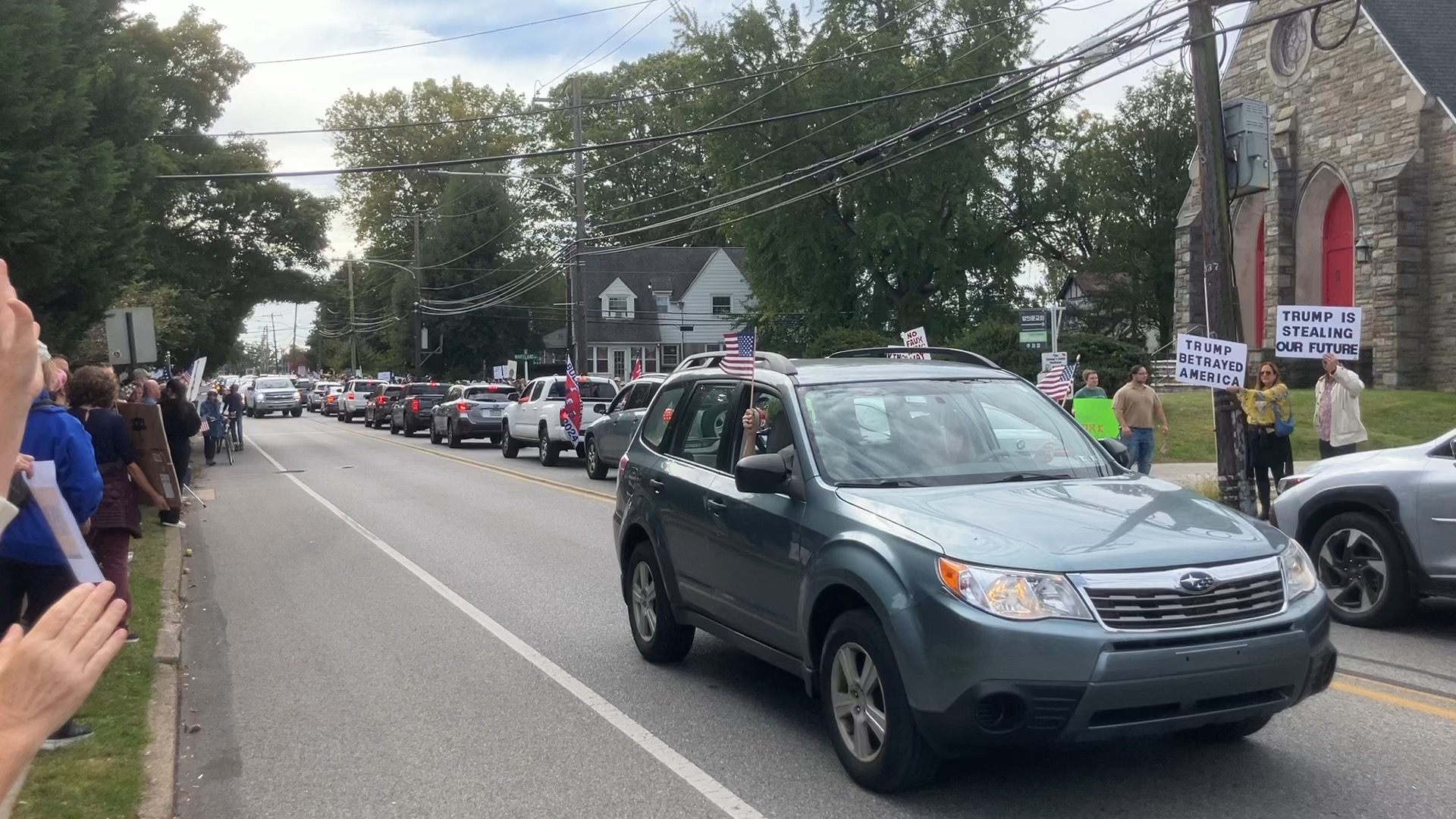
Protesters on Eagle Road in Haverford Township, Pennsylvania

In Pennsylvania, protests were planned in Erie and Pittsburgh. On October 17, protests were held in the Philadelphia area. Police estimate that more than 15,000 people were at the protest in Philadelphia.

=== Rhode Island ===
Ten events were planned in Rhode Island. The largest occurred in Providence, with organizers estimating 32,000 protestors at the Rhode Island State House, and The Providence Journal estimating that well over 20,000 attended. David Morales, Tiara Mack, and Reem Said-Awad spoke. There were no noticeable counter-protests.

=== South Carolina ===
In South Carolina, events were planned in Beaufort, Bluffton, Charleston, Cheraw, Columbia, Greenville, Hilton Head, Florence, Fort Mill, Indian Land, Myrtle Beach, North Charleston, Rock Hill, Seneca, Spartanburg, and Summerville.

=== South Dakota ===
Protests in South Dakota included Aberdeen, Brookings, Huron, Pierre, Rapid City, Sioux Falls, Spearfish, Sturgis, Vermillion, and Watertown.

=== Tennessee ===
Dozens of protests were planned in Tennessee. The Nashville protest was at Capitol Hill. The October rally and protest in Memphis drew a crowd of approximately 7,000, despite the recent deployment of the National Guard and the growing presence of federal agents from thirteen agencies. The event featured local speakers including State representative Justin Pearson, Shelby County DA Steve Mulroy, and City Councilwoman Jerri Green.

=== Texas ===
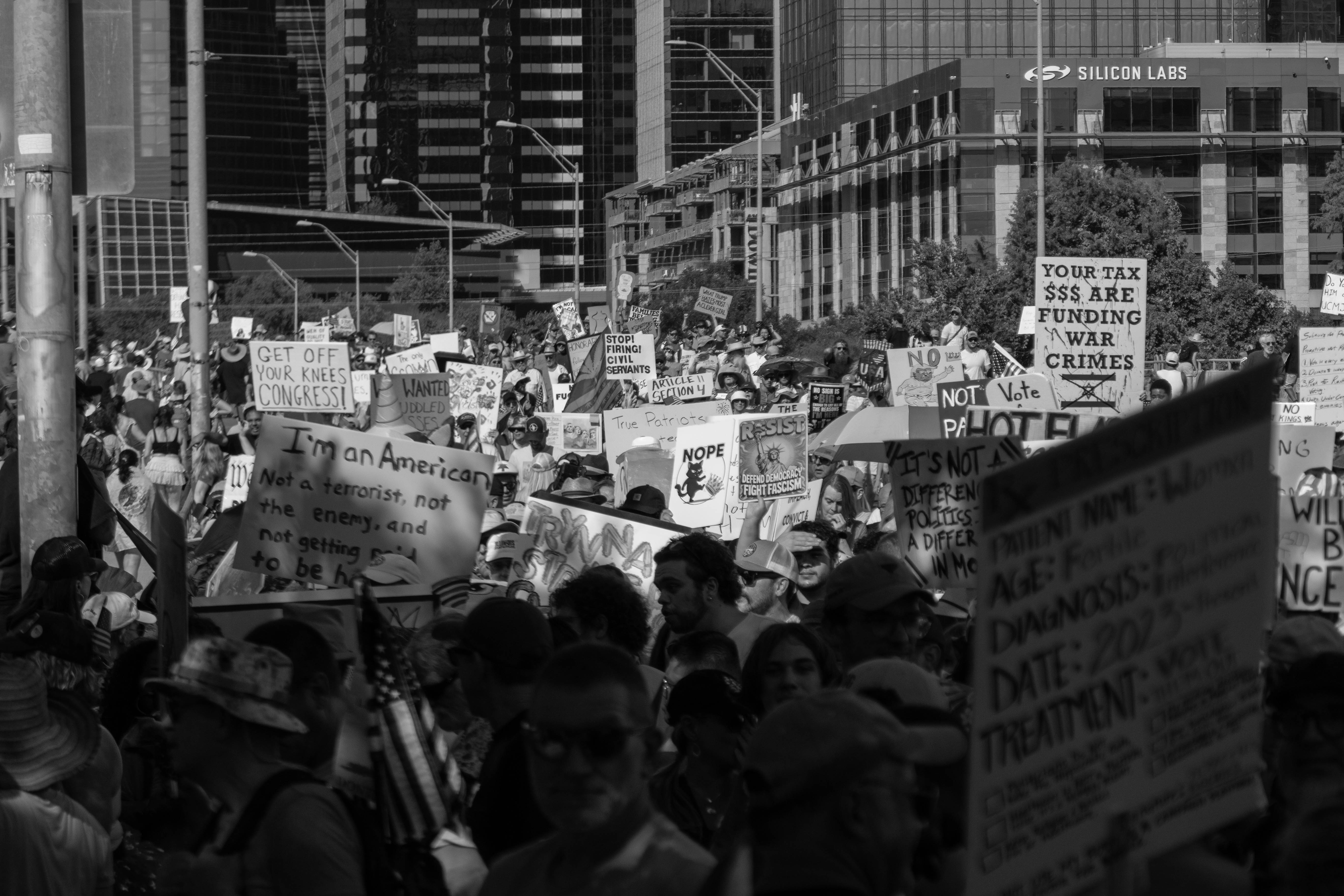
Protest in Austin, Texas

Several demonstrations were planned in North Texas, including in Arlington, Dallas, Fort Worth, Frisco, Flower Mound, Greenville, Jacksboro, McKinney, and Sherman. Indivisible Centex was organizing a demonstration at the Bell County Courthouse in Belton. Protests were also planned in San Antonio and Austin.

Governor Greg Abbott deployed the National Guard, the Texas Ranger Division, state troopers, and the Texas Department of Public Safety to Austin ahead of the rally, with the support of "aircraft and other tactical assets". He said in a statement that "violence and destruction will never be tolerated in Texas" and that he had directed "all necessary law enforcement officials and resources to ensure the safety of Austin residents." Calling the rally a "planned antifa-linked demonstration", Abbott said that the Department of Public Safety would monitor it "as well as any other potential violent demonstrations across the state", and investigate any links to known terrorist organizations. Texas House of Representatives minority leader Gene Wu denounced the use of armed soldiers to suppress peaceful protests as the act of kings, dictators, and their helpers like Abbott.

Protestors rallied outside Houston's city hall, and officials estimated a crowd size of 5,000 people. An estimated 30,000 people protested in Austin. Also, according to The New York Times: "Despite heavy rain, protesters turned out for the 'No Kings' demonstration in Dallas".

=== Utah ===
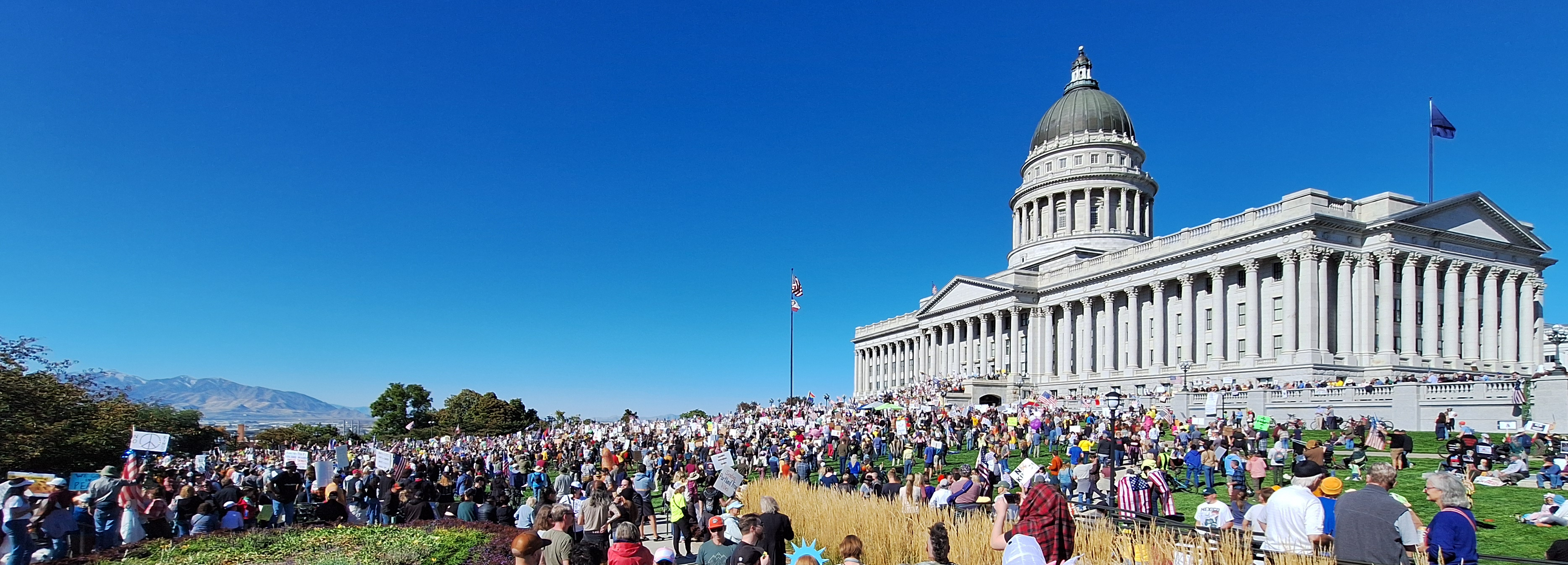
Protesters gathered at the Utah State Capitol in Salt Lake City, Utah

In Utah, demonstrations took place in Salt Lake City, Boulder, Cedar City, Ephraim, Fillmore, Heber City, Logan, Moab, Ogden, Park City, Price, Provo, and St. George. In Salt Lake City, an estimated 15,000 people gathered in front of the Utah State Capitol. The protests were the first in the city since the June 2025 killing of Afa Ah Loo during the earlier No Kings protest.

=== Vermont ===
Over 40 rallies were held in Vermont, including in Barre, Brattleboro, Burlington, Chester, and Montpelier. Speakers at the rallies includes U.S. senator Peter Welch and U.S. congresswoman Becca Balint. Organizers estimated over 10,000 protested in Montpelier, 10,000 in Burlington, and 600 in Chester. The Chester GOP hosted an alternate "Red on Green" protest, attended by an estimated 100 people. An estimated 4,000 people protested in Brattleboro, which is 1/3 of the city's population.

=== Virginia ===
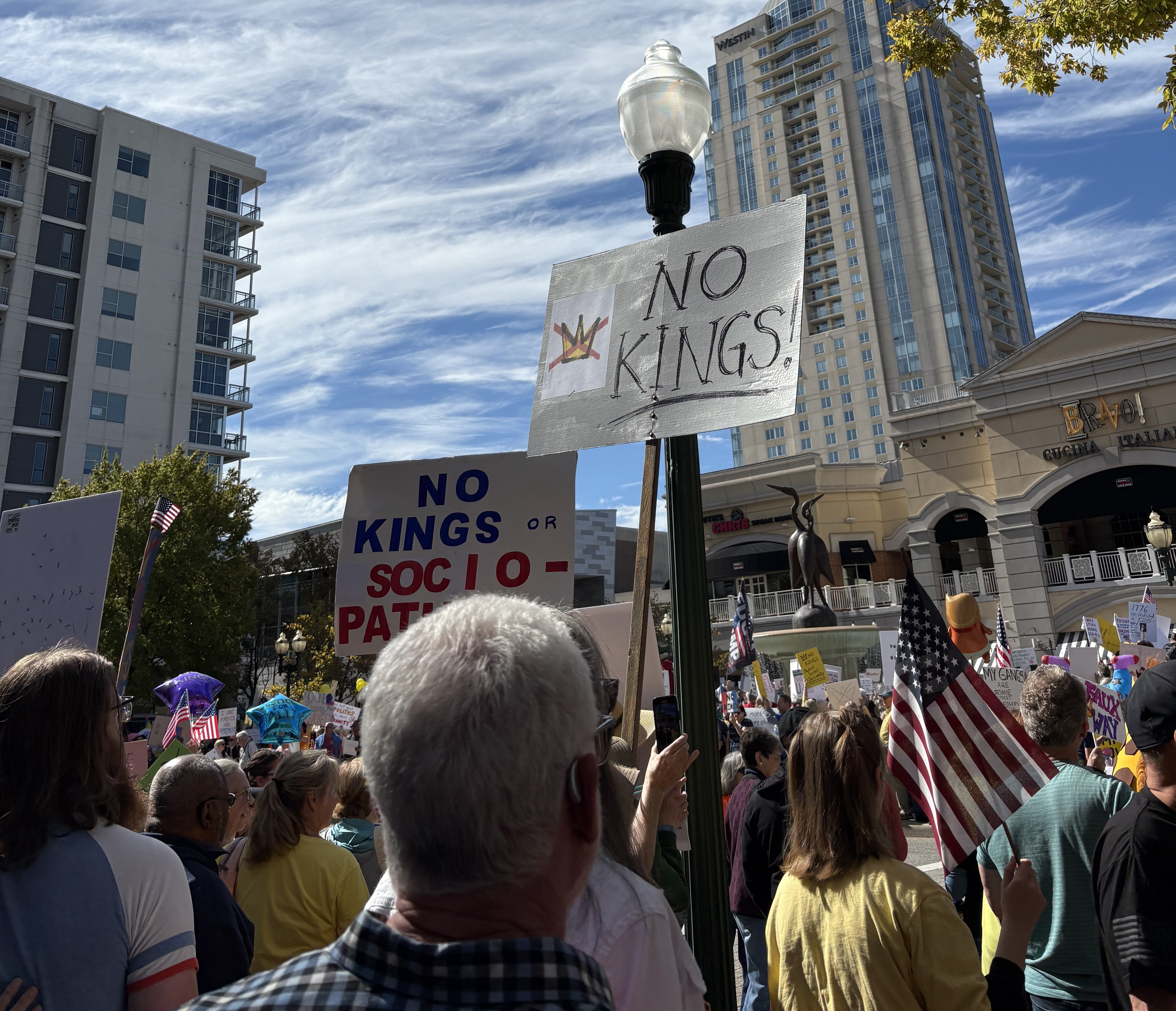
Virginia Beach Town Center during the protest

In Virginia, protests were planned in Arlington, Abingdon, Chesapeake, Galax, Gate City, Norfolk, Virginia Beach, and Williamsburg. 20,000 people attended protests in Richmond. Governor Glenn Youngkin mobilized the Virginia National Guard in advance.

=== Washington ===
In Washington, events were planned in Everett, Gig Harbor, Lakewood, Olympia, Point Defiance in Tacoma, Puyallup, Kennewick and Bellingham. Additional protests in King County, the most populous county in the state, were planned for the cities Federal Way, Auburn, Enumclaw, Maple Valley, Milton, Covington, Des Moines, Mercer Island, Bothell, Shoreline, Lake Forest Park, Edmonds, Kirkland, Redmond, Issaquah, Tukwila and Renton on the Eastside, and the census-designated place Vashon. Rallies were planned to be held in at least six locations in Seattle.

Organizers estimated that over 182,000 people protested across Washington at 118 protests, with the largest protests in Seattle, Spokane, Bellingham, Olympia, Issaquah, Tacoma, Redmond, and Everett. The Downtown Seattle march was more than a mile long, and organizers estimated 90,000 people attended. Thousands of people participated in Spokane. Thousands gathered in Bellingham in the rain, thousands protested in Olympia, the state capitol, and over 4,000 protested in Everett.

=== Washington, D.C. ===
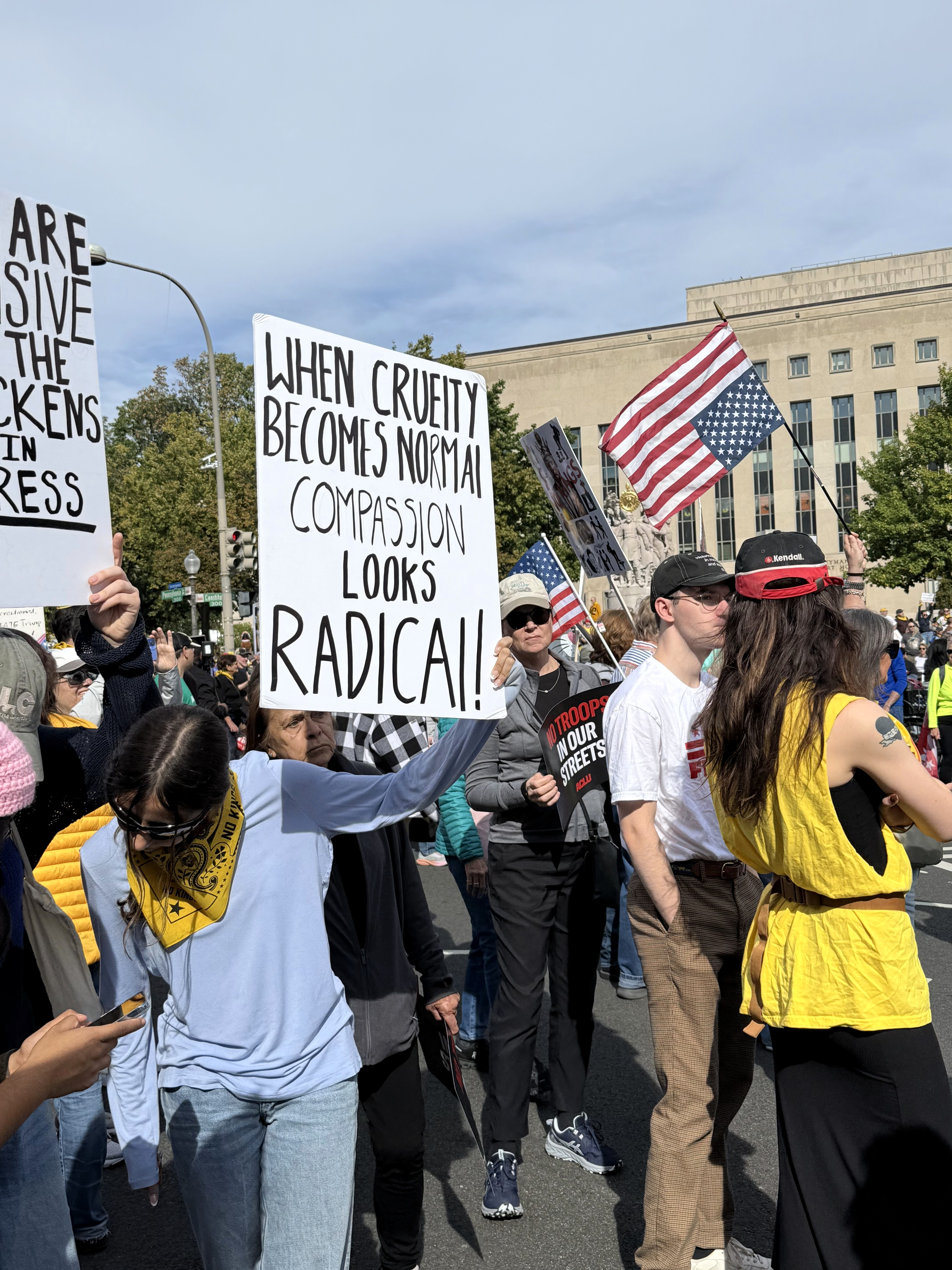
Protesters in Washington, D.C.

In Washington, D.C., multiple protests were planned. On the National Mall, speakers included Mehdi Hasan, Chris Murphy, Bill Nye, and Bernie Sanders. Organizers for the D.C. event estimated the attendance at 200,000.

=== West Virginia ===
There were at least 20 protests in West Virginia. Organizers estimated that 2,400 people protested in Sheperdstown. More than 200 people demonstrated in Charleston. Up to 400 marched through downtown Morgantown to Ruby Amphitheater, and around 100 protested in Fairmont along the Fairmont Gateway Connector. In Beckley, one woman protested alone for two hours, through multiple confrontations.

=== Wisconsin ===
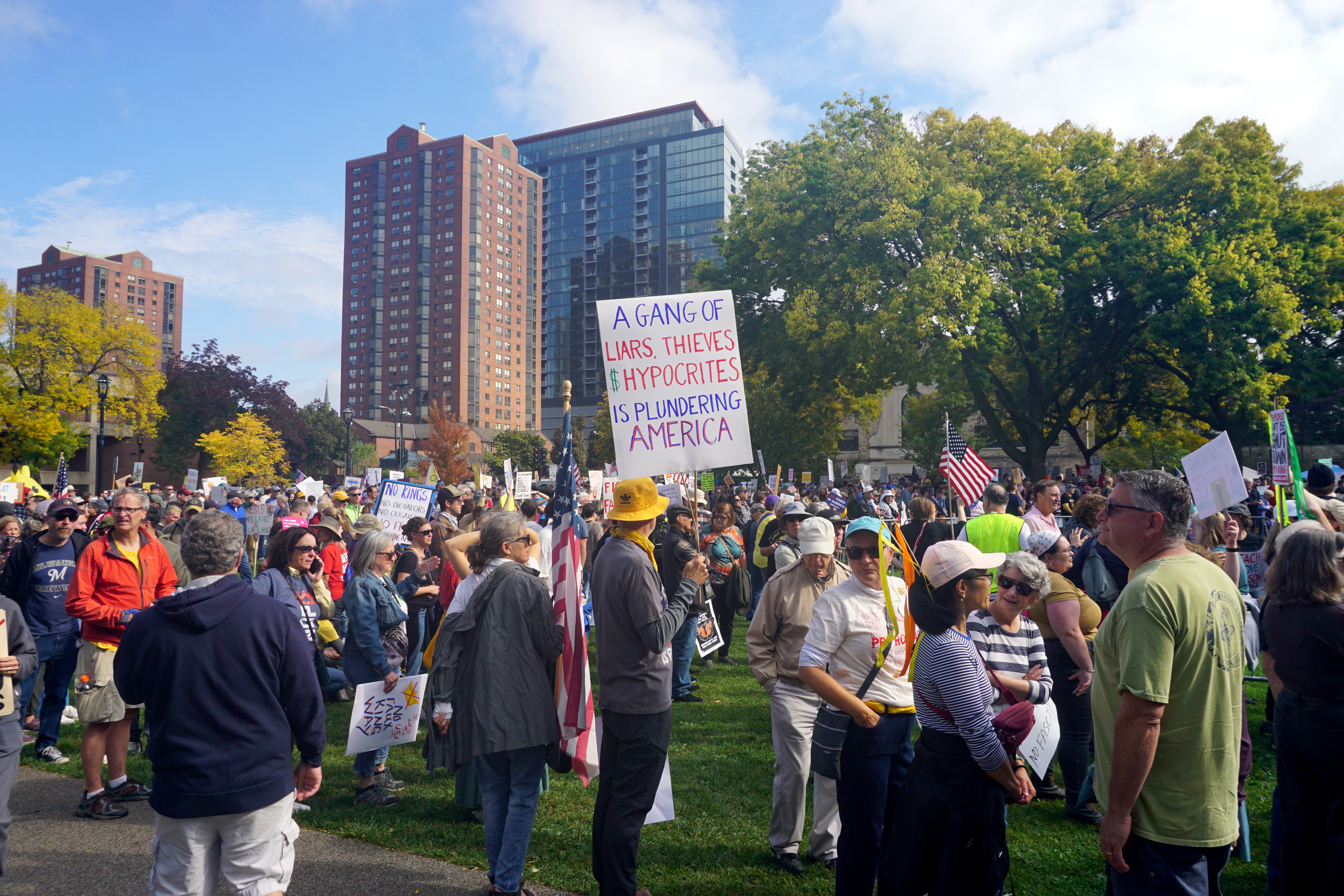
Protest in Milwaukee

About 60 protests were planned in Wisconsin. An estimated 20,000 protestors marched through the state capitol of Madison, over 18,000 marched in downtown Milwaukee, 2,500 in Kenosha along Sheridan Road, and over 1,000 around Courthouse Park in Janesville. Turnout in Madison, Milwaukee, and Green Bay exceeded numbers at their June No Kings protests. Hayward's 1,200-person protest was the largest in city history.

=== Wyoming ===
16 protests were held in Wyoming. Protesters lined the streets around Healing Park in Casper and gathered in front of the state capitol building in Cheyenne. Some protests had counter-demonstrations. About 700 people protested in Casper and Laramie, 550 in Sheridan, 500 in Jackson and Cheyenne, 450 in Cody, and 400 in Lander. Around 200 protested in Sweetwater County's rally, also donating over 200 pounds of food to a local food bank.

=== U.S. territories ===
Protests took place in Puerto Rico, Guam, the Northern Mariana Islands, and the United States Virgin Islands.

== Response by Trump ==
AI-generated video of Donald Trump flying a jet and dropping fecal matter on protesting crowds posted to Truth Social on the same day as the protests

On October 15, Trump predicted that few people would show up for the protests. On October 17, Trump told Fox News, "They say they're referring to me as a king. I'm not a king." That same day, a Trump campaign social media account posted an AI video showing Trump dressed as a monarch, wearing a crown and waving from a balcony.

On the night of the protests, Trump released a video generated with artificial intelligence showing himself wearing a crown in a fighter jet marked "King Trump", dropping brown liquid resembling feces on the protesters. The video included the Kenny Loggins song "Danger Zone" from the 1986 movie Top Gun; Loggins asked Trump to remove his song from the video and told a reporter, "I can't imagine why anybody would want their music used or associated with something created with the sole purpose of dividing us."

== Aftermath ==
The American Civil Liberties Union (ACLU) highlighted the No Kings protests as a significant demonstration of civic participation and the exercise of First Amendment rights in the United States. The ACLU stated that these protests demonstrate that many Americans are actively asserting their rights and will not remain silent when freedoms such as speech, assembly, and the press are perceived to be under threat.

== See also ==
- Gen Z protests – Ongoing worldwide youth protests
