= Stop Trump Coalition =

British anti-Trump organisation

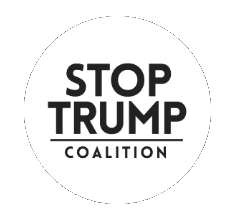
- The logo of the coalition
- Formation: February 8, 2017; 9 years ago
- Legal status: Active
- Headquarters: London
- Region served: United Kingdom
- Official language: English
- Website: stoptrump.org.uk

The Stop Trump Coalition is an anti-Trump and anti-right-wing populism organisation which originated in the United Kingdom. The coalition often interests itself into various other political topics, such as climate activism, trade justice, migrant & refugee rights, workers’ rights, anti‑racism, and support for both Palestine and Ukraine.

== History ==
=== Trump's first term (2017–2021) ===
Following the results of the 2016 United States presidential election and the subsequent election of Donald Trump, the Stop Trump Coalition was idealised in January 2016, before being founded on 8 February 2017.

On 13 July, 2018, they were the main organisers of a significant anti-Trump protest in London, with estimates recording up to 250,000 participants.

On 4 June 2019, the Coalition organised another significant protest, this time with estimates counting up to 75,000 participants, during Trump's visit in London. They were also supported by Fridays for Future activists.

On 16 September 2020, during Trump's second visit in the UK, right before the 2020 United States presidential election, the STC organised another protest against Trump. The number of participants was recorded as "several thousands".

=== Trump's second term (2025–present) ===
On 15 February 2025, the Coalition participated in nationwide protests against Donald Trump's February 2025 Gaza Strip proposal.

On 5 March 2025, following the controversies of the 2025 Trump–Zelenskyy Oval Office meeting, STC organised a protest at the US embassy in London.

On 17 September 2025, the STC organised a protest upon Trump's visit to the UK which gathered up to 5,000 people in Parliament Square. Protests by the Coalition were also held in Edinburgh, Balmedie and Aberdeen.

The Stop Trump Coalition officially participated in the October 2025 No Kings protests.
