= Institute Park =

Public park in Worcester, Massachusetts, US

Coordinates: 42°16′35.9″N 71°48′22.9″W

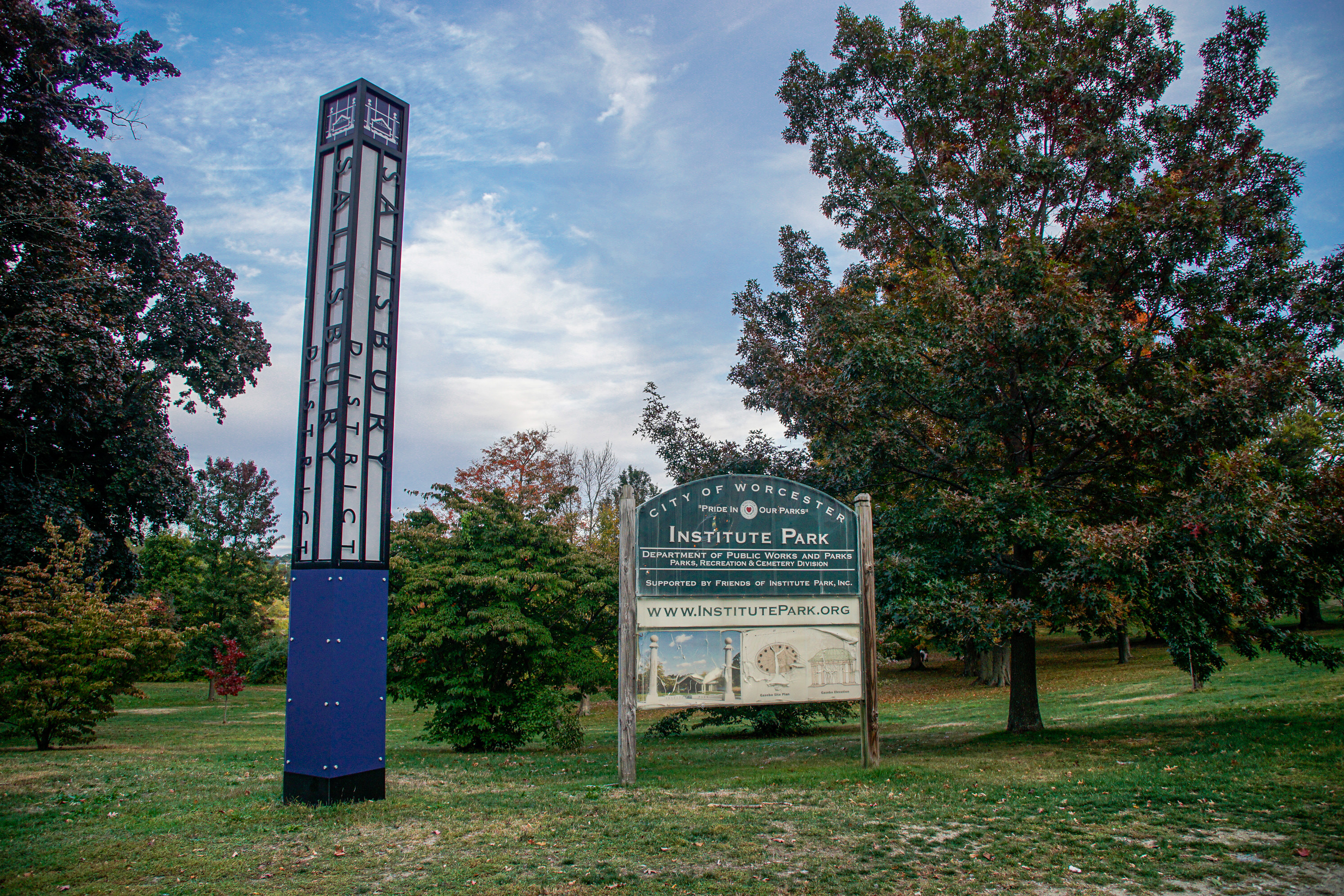
Institute Park

Institute Park is a public park in Worcester, Massachusetts. Founded on donated land in 1887, it is located next to the campus of Worcester Polytechnic Institute. The park is 24.6 acres (100,000 m^{2}) in size.
