= Dartmouth Street =

Dartmouth Street may refer to:

- Dartmouth Street tram stop, Birmingham, England
- Dartmouth Street Grounds, former baseball ground in Boston, Massachusetts, United States
- Dartmouth Street School, Worcester, Massachusetts, United States
- Dartmouth Street, location of original building of Boston Central Library, Boston, Massachusetts, United States
- Dartmouth Street, London, England, location of Two Chairmen pub in London, England
- Dartmouth Street, Somerville, Massachusetts, United States, location of House at 21 Dartmouth Street historic house
