= Bloomingdale Firehouse =

- U.S. National Register of Historic Places
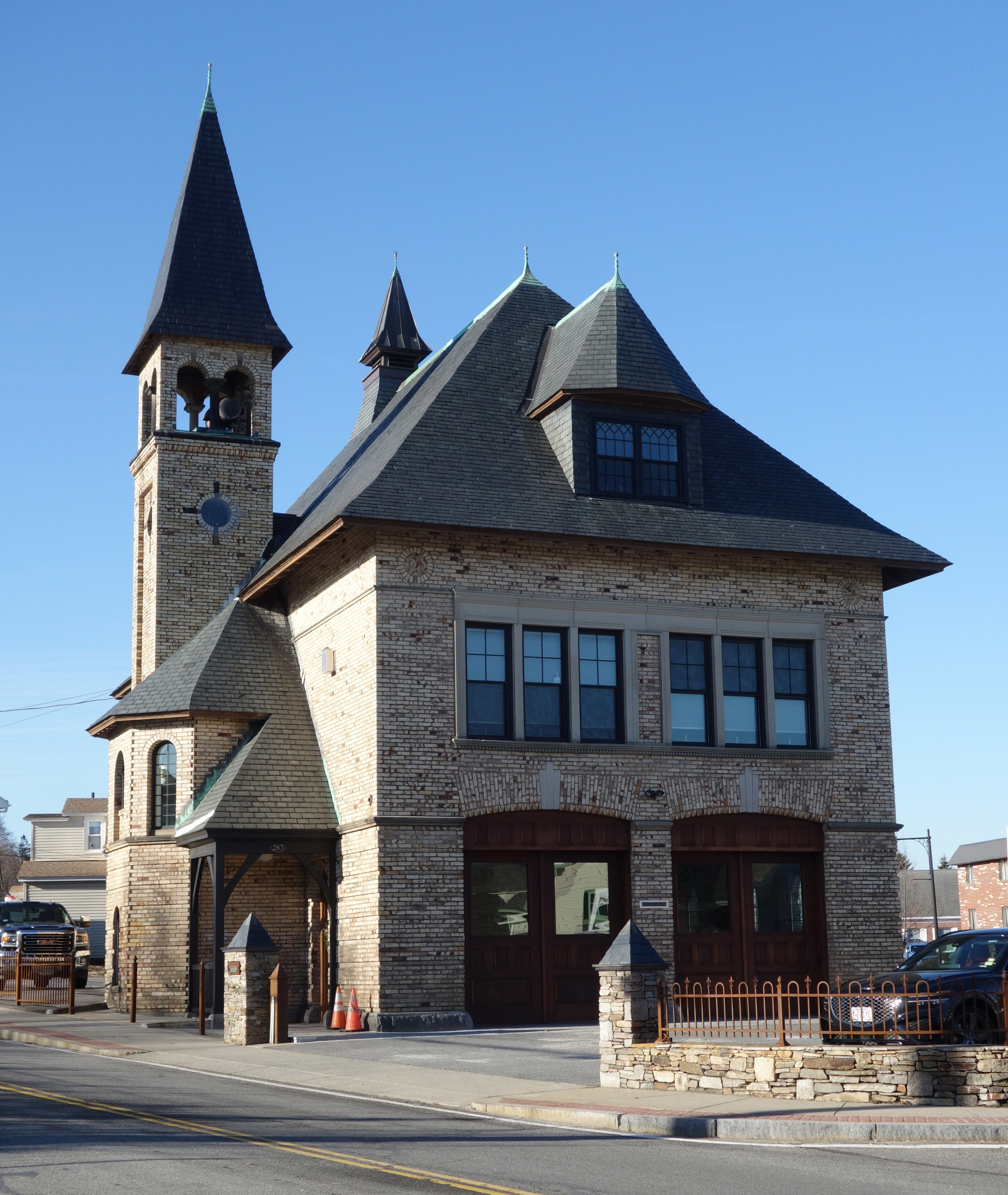

- Location within Massachusetts Location within the United States
- Location: 267 Plantation St., Worcester, Massachusetts
- Coordinates: 42°16′2″N 71°46′27″W
- Built: 1895
- Architect: Clemence, George
- MPS: Worcester MRA
- NRHP reference No.: 80000593
- Added to NRHP: March 5, 1980

Bloomingdale Firehouse, also known as the Brown Square Station, is a historic former firehouse at 267 Plantation Street/676 Franklin Street in Worcester, Massachusetts. Formerly home to the Worcester Fire Department's Engine Company 6, the building was built in 1895–96. It is a well-preserved example of Queen Anne and Colonial Revival styling. The building served as a firehouse until 2008, when it was replaced by a new station, located at 266 Franklin Street, the site of the well-known Worcester Cold Storage and Warehouse Co. fire. It was listed on the National Register of Historic Places in 1980. It has been converted into a private residence.

== Description and history ==
The former Bloomingdale Firehouse is located in central Worcester, at the southwest corner of Franklin and Plantation Streets. Both are arterial roads, and are predominantly residential in the immediate area. The station is a 2 1/2-story structure, built out of yellow brick, and covered with a steeply pitched roof. The first floor is fashioned out of rusticated brick, while the upper floor is of dressed brick. The front of the building has two vehicle bays, above which are two groups of three windows. A bell tower rises at the rear left corner, and there is a small cupola, topped with a pyramidal roof, set near the back of the roof.

The building was designed by Worcester architect George Clemence and built in 1895–96, and is a well-preserved example of a civic building with Colonial Revival and Queen Anne features. The building served as a firehouse until 2008, making the transition from horsedrawn equipment to modern fire trucks. In November 2008, a new fire station was opened at 266 Franklin Street, on the site of the 1999 Worcester Cold Storage and Warehouse Co. fire, which took the lives of six firefighters. A plan to rehabilitate the station into a residence was approved in 2014.

== See also ==
- National Register of Historic Places listings in eastern Worcester, Massachusetts
