= Elizabeth Street =

Elizabeth Street may refer to:

- Elizabeth Street, Brisbane, Queensland, Australia
- Elizabeth Street, Hobart, Tasmania, Australia
- Elizabeth Street, Lexington, Kentucky, United States
- Elizabeth Street, London, England
- Elizabeth Street (Manhattan), New York City, United States
- Elizabeth Street, Melbourne, Victoria, Australia
- Elizabeth Street, Sydney, New South Wales, Australia
- Elizabeth Street (Toronto), Ontario, Canada
- Elizabeth Street School, Worcester, Massachusetts, United States

== See also ==
- Princess Elizabeth Avenue
