= Brookfield Common Historic District =

Historic district in Massachusetts, United States

- U.S. National Register of Historic Places
- U.S. Historic district
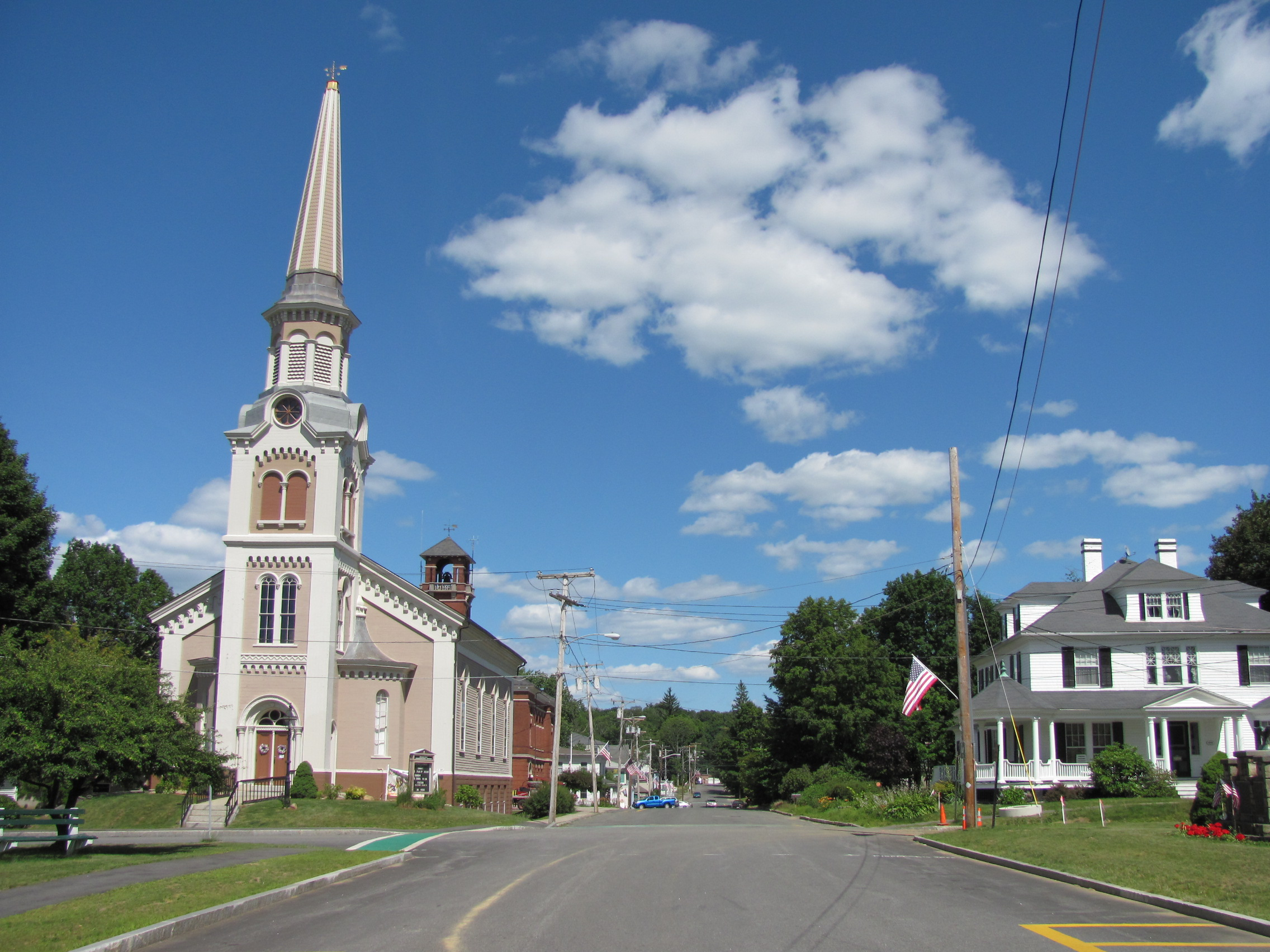
- Congregational Church and Central Street

- Location within Massachusetts Location within the United States
- Location: Roughly Howard, Sherman, Prouty, W. Main, Main, and Upper River Sts., Brookfield, Massachusetts
- Coordinates: 42°12′51″N 72°6′9″W
- Area: 62 acres (25 ha)
- Architect: Multiple
- Architectural style: Greek Revival, Late Victorian, Federal
- NRHP reference No.: 90000161
- Added to NRHP: February 23, 1990

The Brookfield Common Historic District encompasses a historically significant portion of the town center of Brookfield, Massachusetts. It is focused on the town common, which extends south from Main Street (Massachusetts Route 9) to Lincoln Street, and includes a dense cluster of houses on roads to its east, as well as properties on Main Street and the Post Road. The district includes more than 100 properties, including the Colonial Revival Town Hall (designed 1904 by Worcester architect George H. Clemence), Banister Memorial Hall (an 1883 Queen Anne building designed by Wait & Cutter of Boston, which now houses the Merrick Public Library), and Romanesque Revival Congregation Church (built 1857 to a design by Boyden & Ball). The district was added to the National Register of Historic Places in 1990.

The town of Brookfield was one of the first English settlements in what is now southern Worcester County, dating to 1665. What is now Brookfield is the result of the division of the community in the 1750s, separating North Brookfield and West Brookfield. The original town center was located in what is now West Brookfield; the present town center is organized around a common established in 1735 as a militia training ground, and where the town's Third Parish Congregational Church was established. The oldest surviving buildings in the village are houses built in the 1790s in the Federal style. The Brookfield Inn was originally established in one of these early houses, but was replaced in the 1860s after the original house was destroyed by fire.

== See also ==
- National Register of Historic Places listings in Worcester County, Massachusetts
