= Embassy of Slovenia, London =

Coordinates: 51.4999°N 0.1322°W

Embassy of Slovenia in London
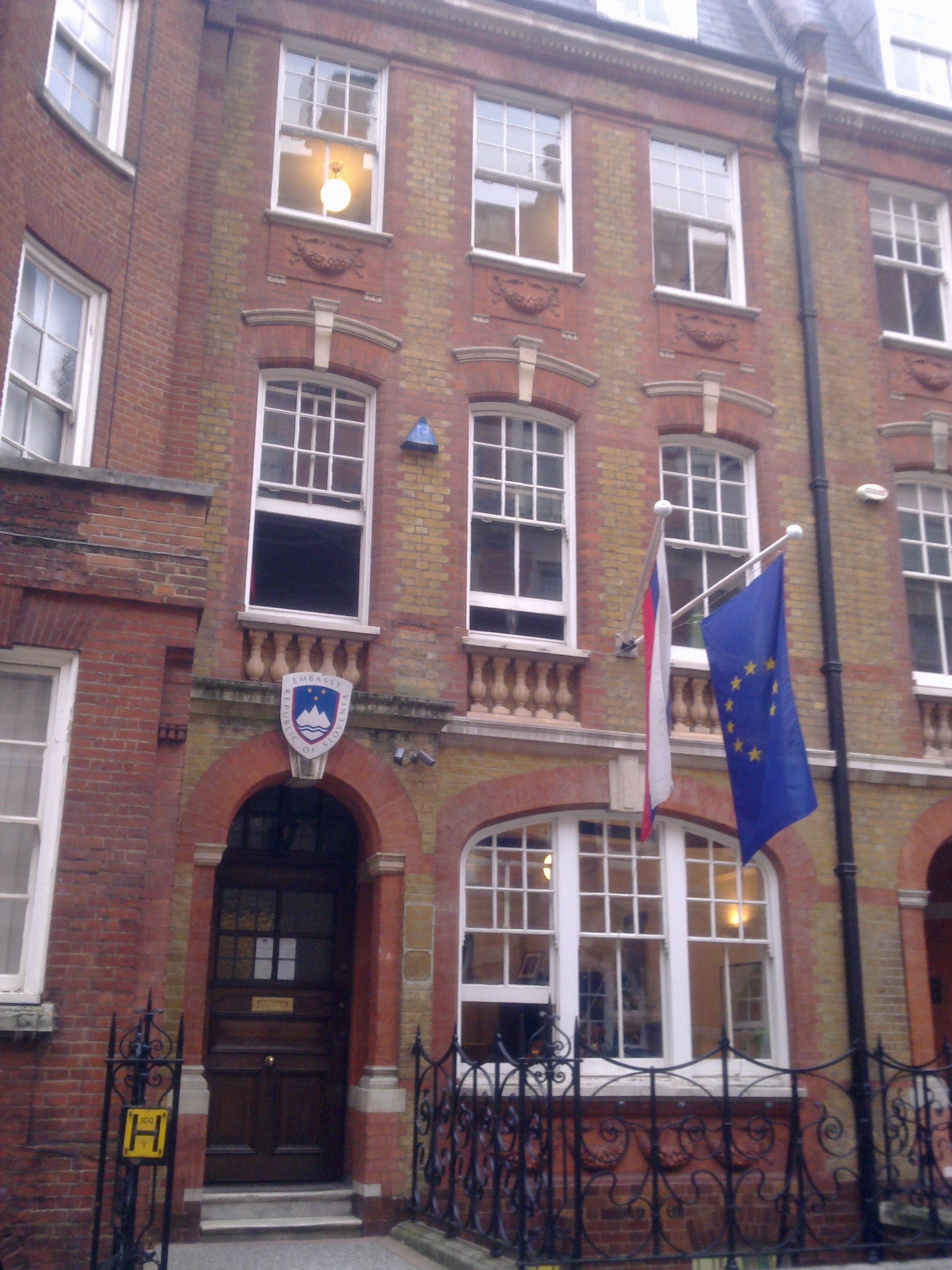
- Previous location of the Embassy of Slovenia; 10 Little College Street, London
- Location: Westminster, London
- Address: 17 Dartmouth Street, London, SW1H 9BL
- Ambassador: Iztok Jarc

The Embassy of Slovenia in London is the diplomatic mission of Slovenia in the United Kingdom. It was opened in 1992, one year after Slovenia declared independence from Yugoslavia. Previously on Little College Street, it later moved to Dartmouth Street.
