= Worcester Fire Department =

Fire department in Massachusetts, USA

Operational area
- Country: United States
- State: Massachusetts
- City: Worcester

Agency overview
- Established: 25 February 1835
- Employees: 424 (2013)
- Annual budget: $33,940,872 (2013)
- Staffing: Career
- Fire chief: Michael Lavoie
- EMS level: BLS
- IAFF: 1009

Facilities and equipment
- Divisions: 2
- Stations: 10
- Engines: 13
- Trucks: 5
- Tillers: 2
- Rescues: 1
- HAZMAT: 1
- Rescue boats: 1

Website
- Official website
- IAFF website

The Worcester Fire Department (WFD) provides fire protection and emergency medical services to the city of Worcester, Massachusetts. The department serves an area of 39 square miles (100 km^{2}) with a population of 183,000 residents.

== Notable incidents ==
=== Worcester Cold Storage and Warehouse fire ===
On December 3, 1999, six firefighters were killed at the Worcester Cold Storage Warehouse fire. The fire occurred at 6:13 p.m. in an abandoned cold storage warehouse at Box 1438, 266 Franklin Street. Six Worcester firefighters died while looking for two homeless victims thought to be trapped in the blaze. The fire went to five alarms and took six days to bring under control. Those killed were:

- Lieutenant Thomas Spencer, 42, Ladder 2
- Firefighter Paul Brotherton, 41, Rescue 1
- Firefighter Jeremiah Lucey, 38, Rescue 1
- Firefighter Timothy Jackson, 51, Ladder 2
- Firefighter James Lyons, 34, Engine 3
- Firefighter Joseph McGuirk, 38, Engine 3

Services for the firefighters were held in the DCU Center (then called Worcester's Centrum Centre). The funeral procession was broadcast on several national news networks and was attended by President Bill Clinton, Vice President Al Gore, Senator Ted Kennedy and Senator John Kerry (who flew non-stop from Burma, where he had been attending a diplomatic function). Also in the procession were firefighters from around the United States, Canada, and from Dublin, Ireland.

Because his cousin, FF. Lucey, and high school friend, Lt. Spencer were killed in the fire, actor/comedian Denis Leary, a Worcester native, started the Leary Firefighters Foundation in 2000 to give aid and support to many fire departments, particularly those suffering from budget shortfalls by providing them with new equipment.
