= Waldo Street Police Station =

- U.S. National Register of Historic Places
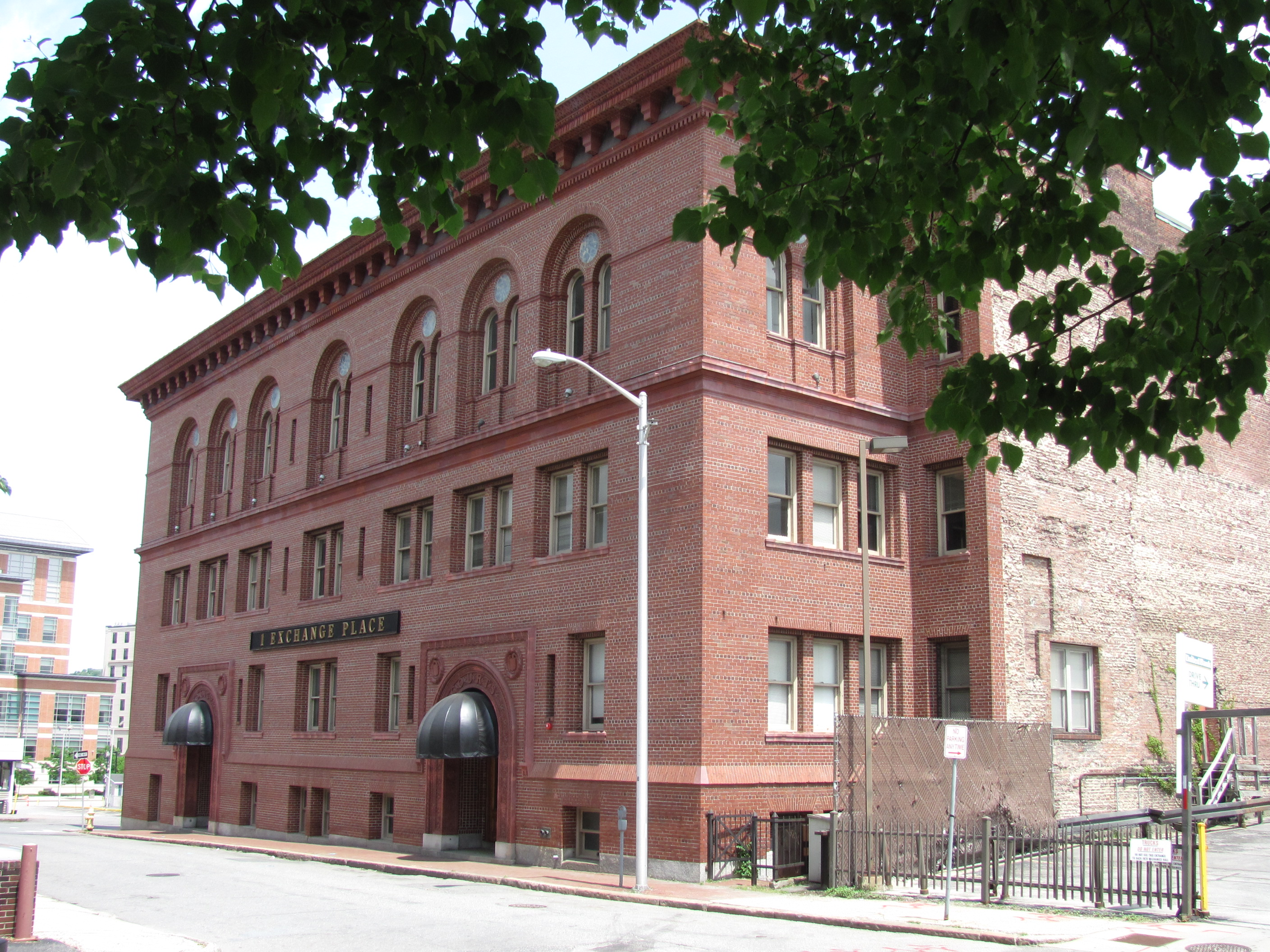
- Waldo Street Police Station

- Location within Massachusetts Location within the United States
- Location: 31 Waldo St., Worcester, Massachusetts
- Coordinates: 42°15′56″N 71°48′0″W
- Area: less than one acre
- Built: 1918
- Architect: Clemence, George H.
- Architectural style: Renaissance
- MPS: Worcester MRA
- NRHP reference No.: 80000586
- Added to NRHP: March 5, 1980

The Waldo Street Police Station is a historic former police station on Waldo Street in Worcester, Massachusetts. Built in 1918 to a design by George H. Clemence, it is a distinctive local example of Renaissance Revival architecture. It served as the city's police headquarters and district until 1980, and now houses commercial tenants. The building, now part of One Exchange Place, was listed on the National Register of Historic Places in 1980.

== Description and history ==
The former Waldo Street Police Station is located in downtown Worcester, at the corner of Waldo Street and Exchange Street. It is a three-story masonry structure, built out of red brick and terracotta trim and set on a high foundation. Its two main entrances face Waldo Street, set recessed in rounded arches surrounded by elaborate terracotta carvings; the north entrance is marked "Police" while the south one is marked "Courts". A cornice separates the second and third floors, and the third-floor windows are set in groups in round-arch recesses. Each window in the group has a rounded top, and the group is topped by a round decorative panel. The building has a heavily bracketed cornice.

The station was built in 1918 to a design by local architect George H. Clemence, to replace the city's 1880s-era police headquarters. The building was closed as a police station in 1980. Now known as One Exchange Place, it has a variety of commercial and professional tenants.

== See also ==
- National Register of Historic Places listings in northwestern Worcester, Massachusetts
- National Register of Historic Places listings in Worcester County, Massachusetts
