= Upsala Street School =

- U.S. National Register of Historic Places
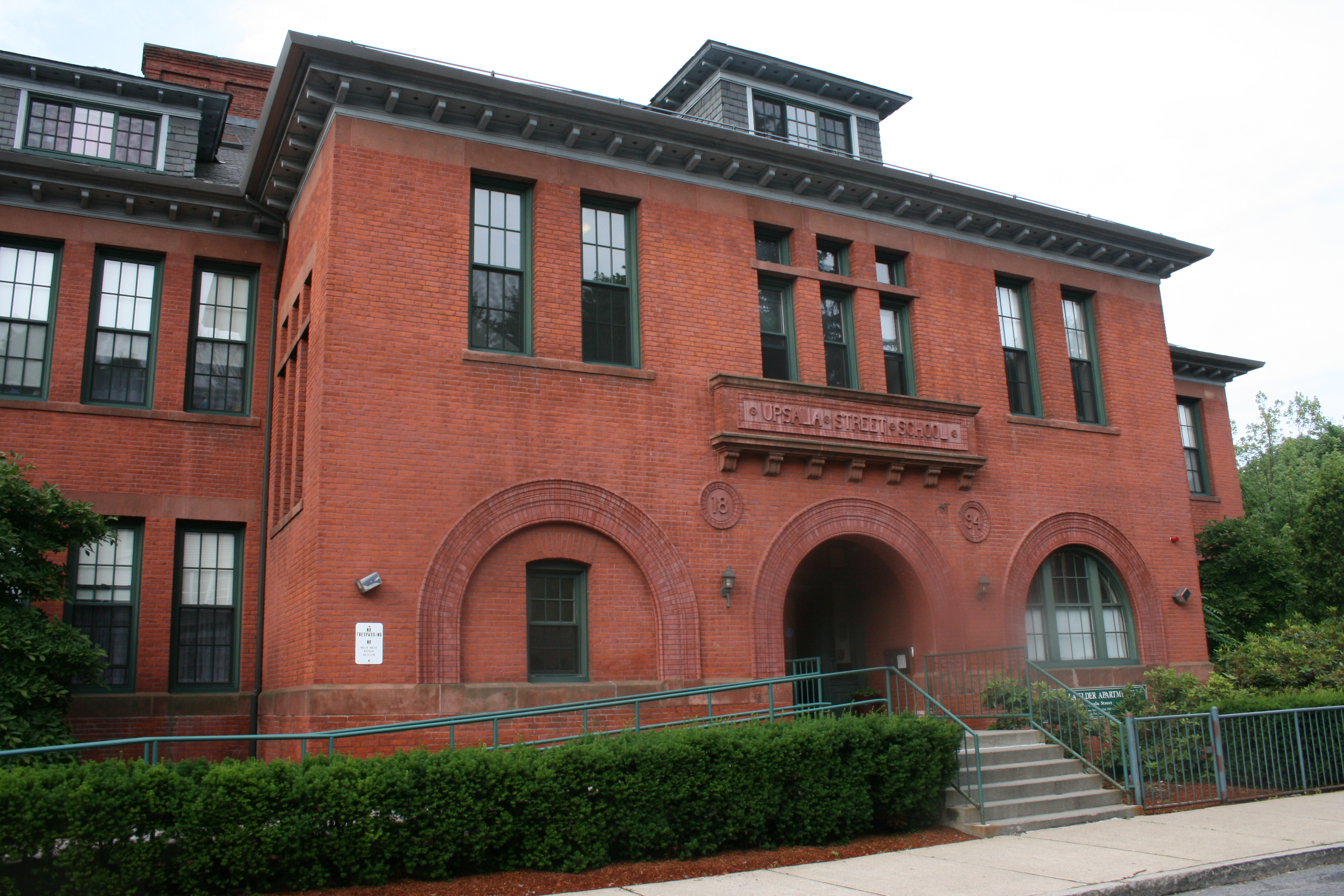

- Location within Massachusetts Location within the United States
- Location: 36 Upsala St., Worcester, Massachusetts
- Coordinates: 42°14′30″N 71°47′44″W
- Area: less than one acre
- Built: 1894
- Architect: Clemence, George
- Architectural style: Romanesque
- MPS: Worcester MRA
- NRHP reference No.: 80000493
- Added to NRHP: March 5, 1980

The Upsala Street School is a historic school building at 36 Upsala Street in Worcester, Massachusetts. Built in 1894 and twice enlarged, it is a good local example of a Romanesque Revival school building, designed by local architect George Clemence. It was listed on the National Register of Historic Places in 1980. The building has been converted into senior living apartments.

== Description and history ==
The former Upsala Street School building is located in southeastern Worcester's Vernon Hill neighborhood, at the southeast corner of Upsala and Louise Streets. It is a 2-1/2 story brick building, covered by a hip roof. The main facade is symmetrical, with a large central projecting section which has the main entry recessed inside a round archway, which is flanked by a pair of smaller blind arches. Above the entry is a shallow balcony with a sandstone plaque identifying the building. Hip-roof dormers project from the roof, and tall chimneys are finished panel brick.

The school was designed by architect George Clemence and its oldest section, the front, was completed in 1894. The city had the school built to meet demand spurred by the growth and development of the surrounding neighborhood. Additions were added to the south in 1902 and 1923 to meet increasing demand. The 1902 addition is stylistically similar to the original main block, and may have formed part of the original design. The 1923 addition is finished in red brick, but has sandstone trim and a flat roof, which distinguish it from the earlier construction.

== See also ==
- National Register of Historic Places listings in eastern Worcester, Massachusetts
