= LaCroix-Mosher House =

Historic house in Massachusetts, United States

- U.S. National Register of Historic Places
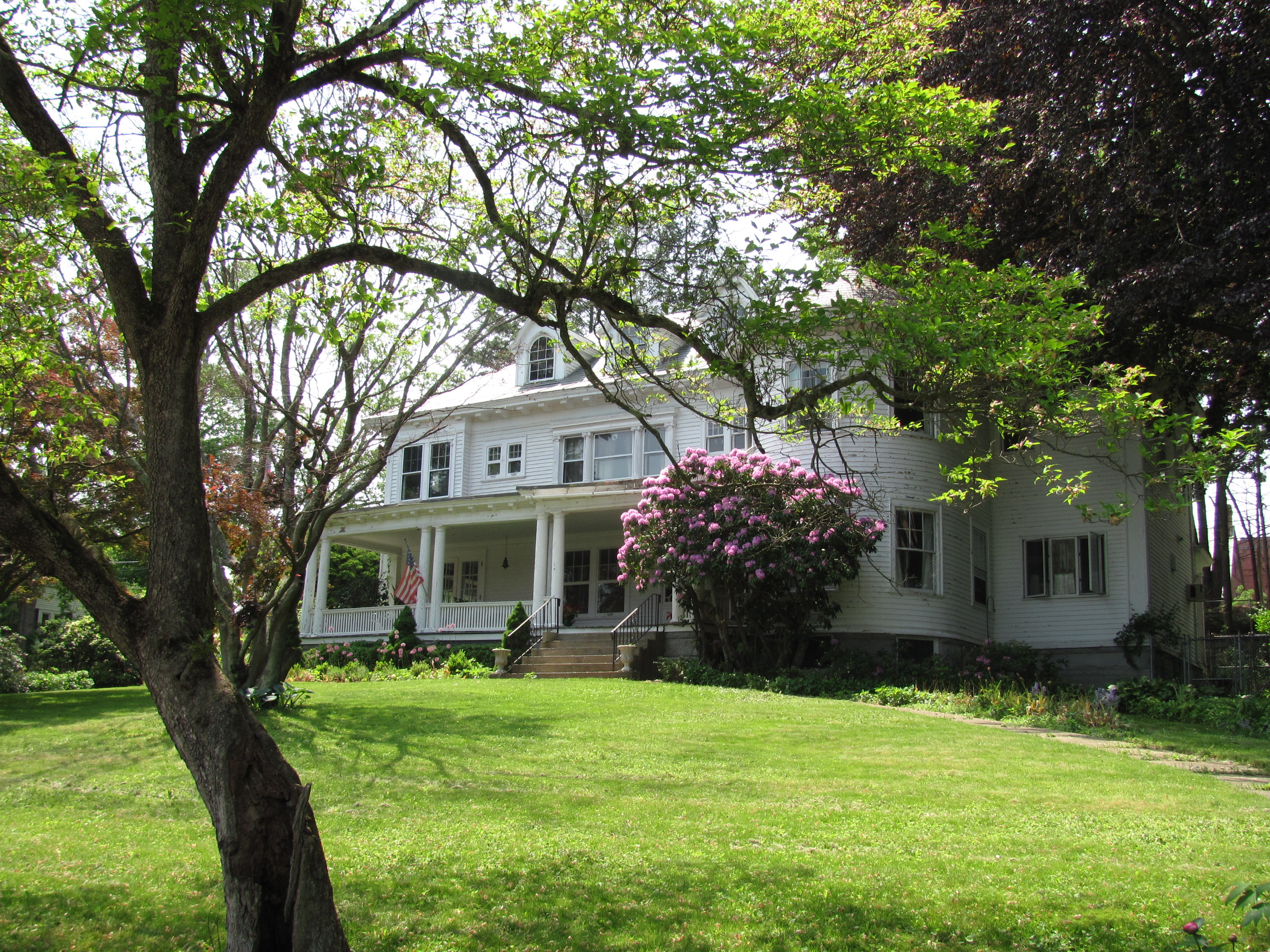
- LaCroix-Mosher House

- Location within Massachusetts Location within the United States
- Location: 56 Everett St., Southbridge, Massachusetts
- Coordinates: 42°4′21″N 72°2′2″W
- Built: 1904
- Architect: Clemence, George H.
- Architectural style: Colonial Revival
- MPS: Southbridge MRA
- NRHP reference No.: 89000524
- Added to NRHP: June 22, 1989

The LaCroix-Mosher House is a historic house at 56 Everett Street in Southbridge, Massachusetts. It is one of a few remaining Colonial Revival mansions from the early 20th century in Southbridge. It was designed by architect George H. Clemence, and built c. 1904-07 for Joseph Lacroix, president of the Hyde Manufacturing Company. In the late 1920s the house was acquired by Ira Mosher, vice president of the American Optical Company.

The house was listed on the National Register of Historic Places in 1989.

== See also ==
- National Register of Historic Places listings in Southbridge, Massachusetts
- National Register of Historic Places listings in Worcester County, Massachusetts
