= Globe Village Fire House =

- U.S. National Register of Historic Places
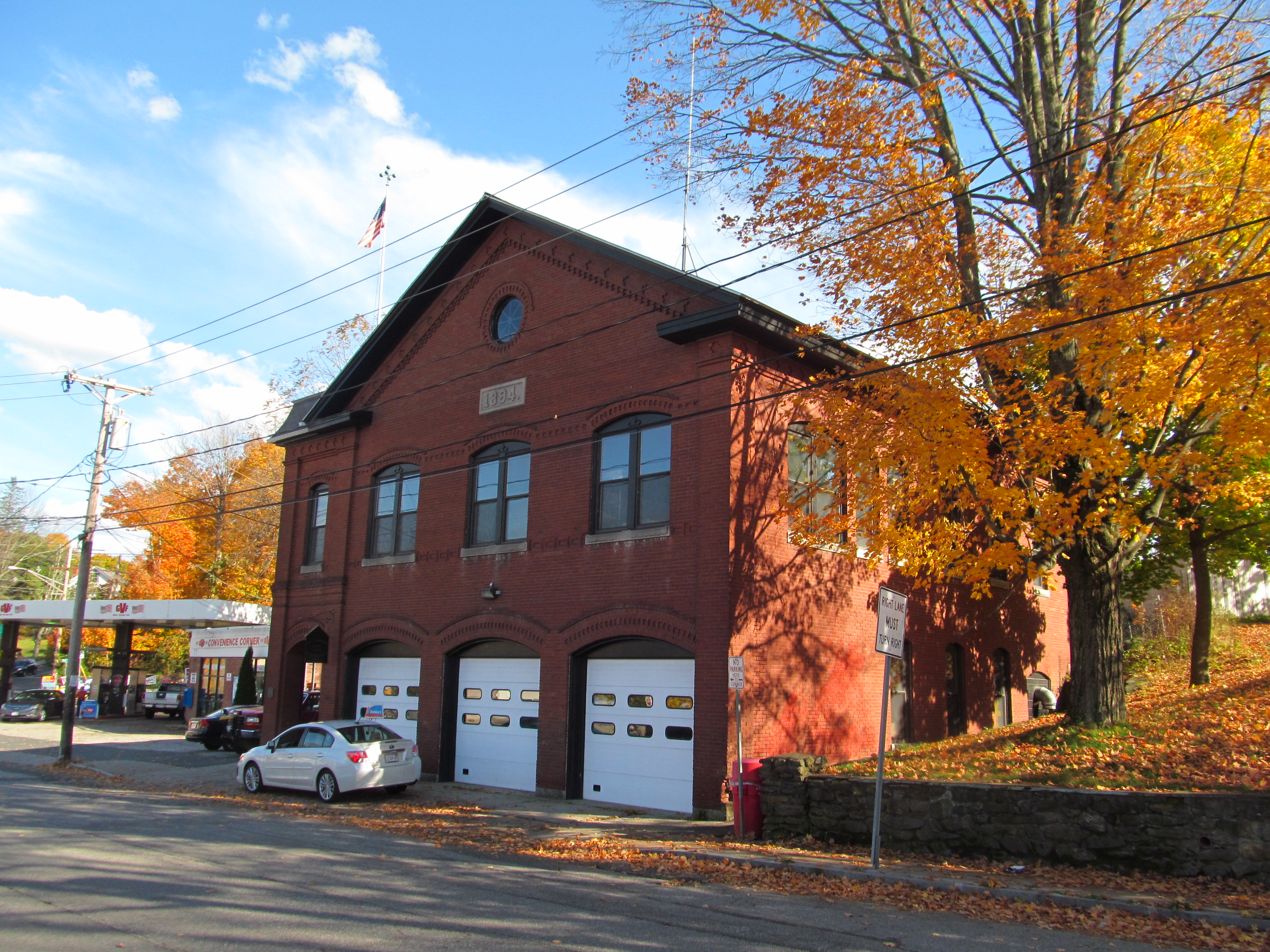

- Location within Massachusetts Location within the United States
- Location: West St. at Main St., Southbridge, Massachusetts
- Coordinates: 42°4′47″N 72°2′45″W
- Area: less than one acre
- Built: 1894
- Architectural style: Colonial Revival
- MPS: Southbridge MRA
- NRHP reference No.: 89000540
- Added to NRHP: June 22, 1989

The Globe Village Fire House is a historic former fire house on West Street at Main Street in Southbridge, Massachusetts. It is the first of two fire stations built by the city in the 1890s; the other, the Elm Street Fire House, is still in use as a fire station. The building was listed on the National Register of Historic Places in 1989. At the time of its listing it had been repurposed for use by a veterans group.

== Description and history ==
The Globe Village Fire House is located near the center of the Southbridge's Globe Village, a commercial nexus west of downtown Southbridge, on the south side of West Street near Main Street. It is a relatively modest Colonial Revival brick structure, although it shares some Greek Revival features with other nearby brick structures. It is 2-1/2 stories in height, with three equipment bays occupying most of the ground floor. To their left is a corner tower, capped by a mansard-style roof, with a pedestrian entrance set in a recess at its base. Most doors and windows are set in segmented-arch openings, and there is a round window at the center of the front gable. The building corners are adorner with brick pilasters, and a line of brick corbelling is set under the roof eave.

The station was built in 1894, and was the second permanent home for the Globe Village Fire Company, which had been founded in 1832. The first building for this company was built in 1860, and stood on the north side of Main Street.

== See also ==
- National Register of Historic Places listings in Southbridge, Massachusetts
- National Register of Historic Places listings in Worcester County, Massachusetts
