= Beacon Street Firehouse =

- U.S. National Register of Historic Places
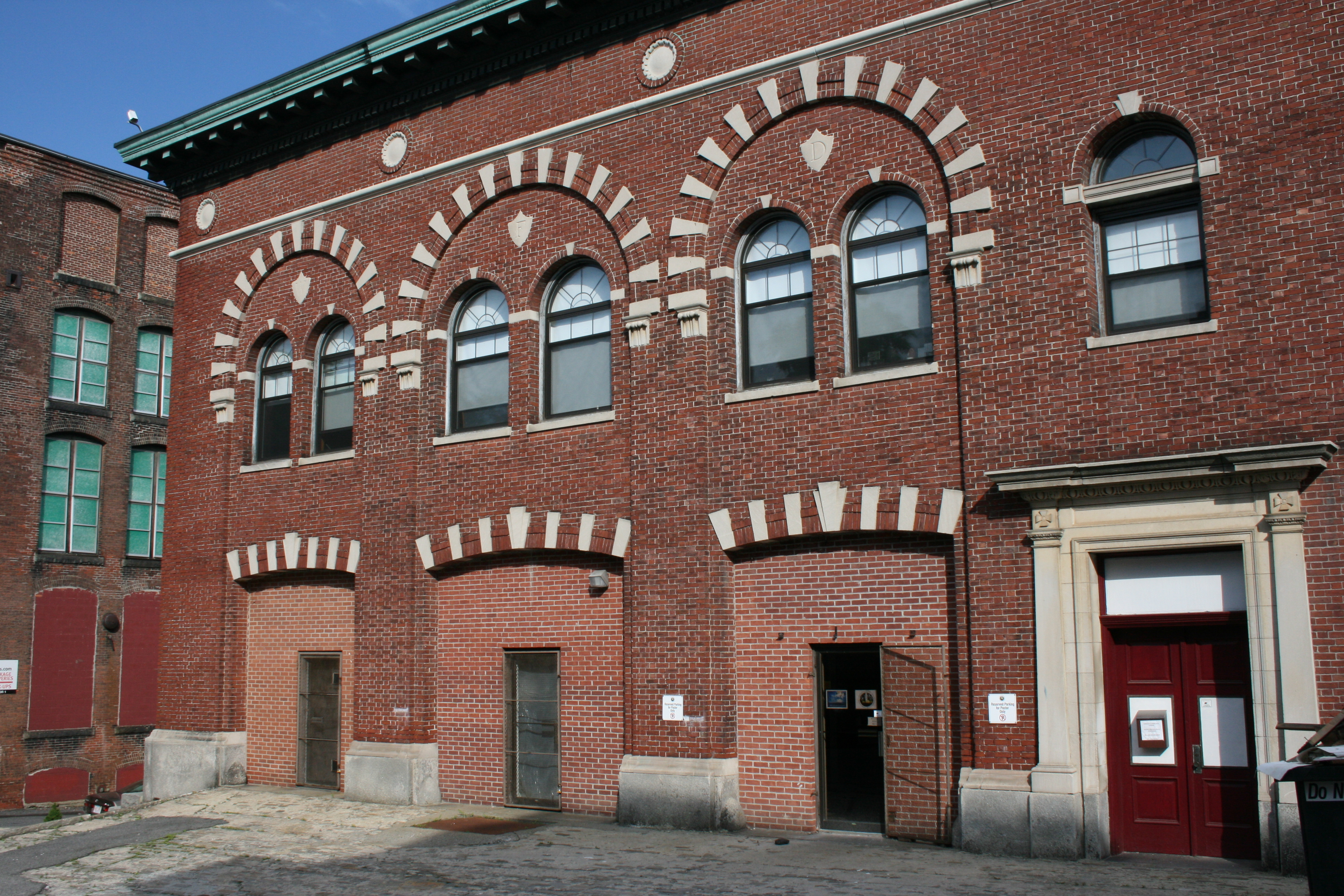

- Location within Massachusetts Location within the United States
- Location: 108 Beacon St., Worcester, Massachusetts
- Coordinates: 42°15′16″N 71°48′34″W
- Built: 1902
- Architect: Clemence, George H.
- Architectural style: Renaissance
- MPS: Worcester MRA
- NRHP reference No.: 80000538
- Added to NRHP: March 5, 1980

The Beacon Street Firehouse is a historic fire station at 108 Beacon Street in Worcester, Massachusetts. It was designed by Worcester architect George H. Clemence, and built 1901–02 for $25,600 by local French-Canadian builder Eli Belisle. It is a two-story rectangular building with three truck bays, and an entrance door on the right. The truck bays are topped by shallow arches of alternating brick and limestone sections. The second floor windows are arched in pairs by round arches of similar styling.

The building was added to the National Register of Historic Places in 1980, at which time it served as a warehouse.

== See also ==
- National Register of Historic Places listings in southwestern Worcester, Massachusetts
- National Register of Historic Places listings in Worcester County, Massachusetts
