= Green Hill Park =

Park in Worcester, Massachusetts

Coordinates: 42°16′51.91″N 71°46′42.71″W

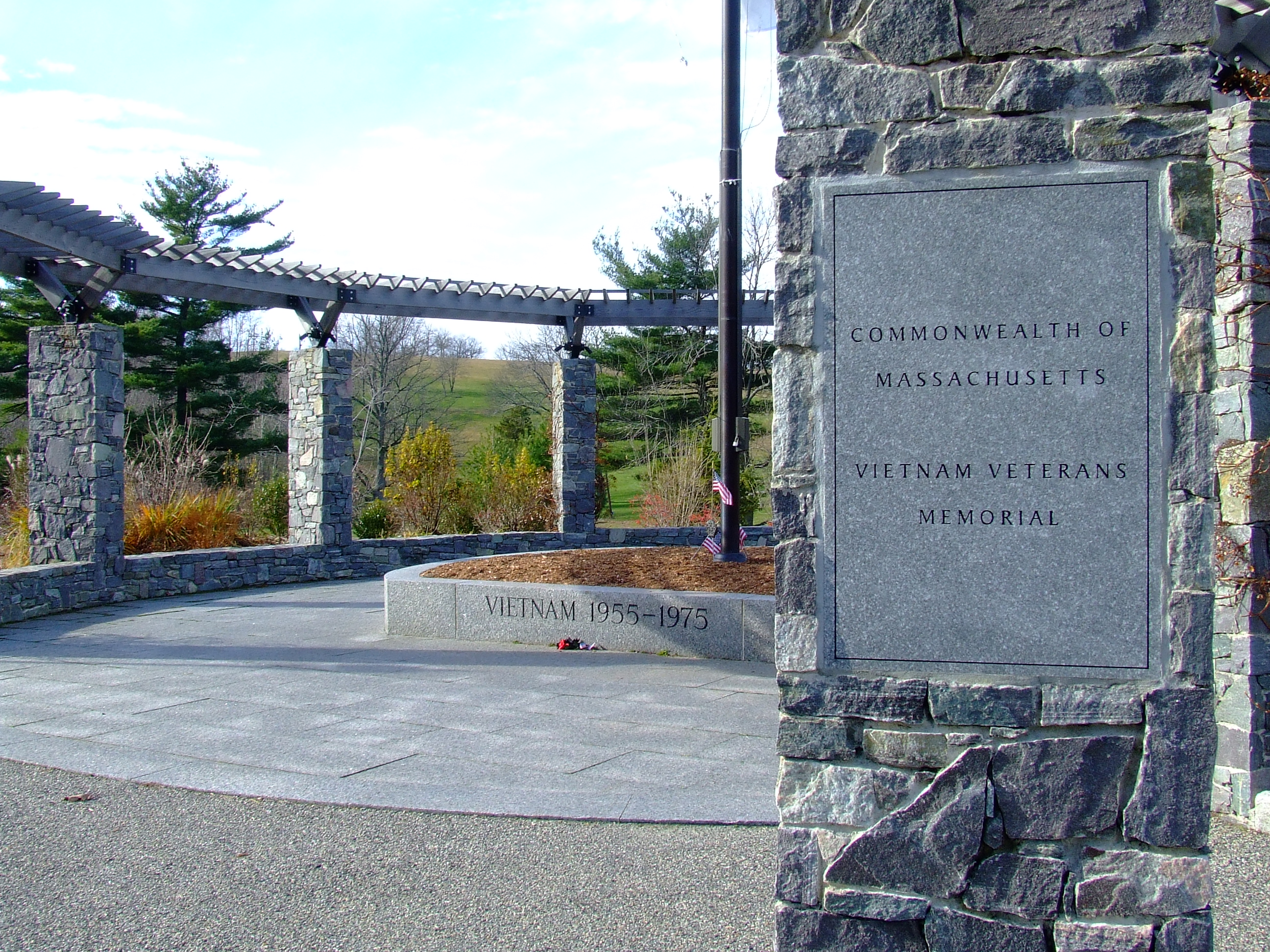
Massachusetts Vietnam Veterans' Memorial

Green Hill Park is a large public park in Worcester, Massachusetts. The largest in the city, the park covers over 480 acres (1.9 km^{2}). It is home to the Massachusetts Vietnam Veterans' Memorial, which honors veterans of the Vietnam War from Massachusetts. The Memorial was opened in June 2002. It is home to the Green Hill Park Shelter, an historic building on the National Register of Historic Places.
