= Elm Street Fire House =

- U.S. National Register of Historic Places
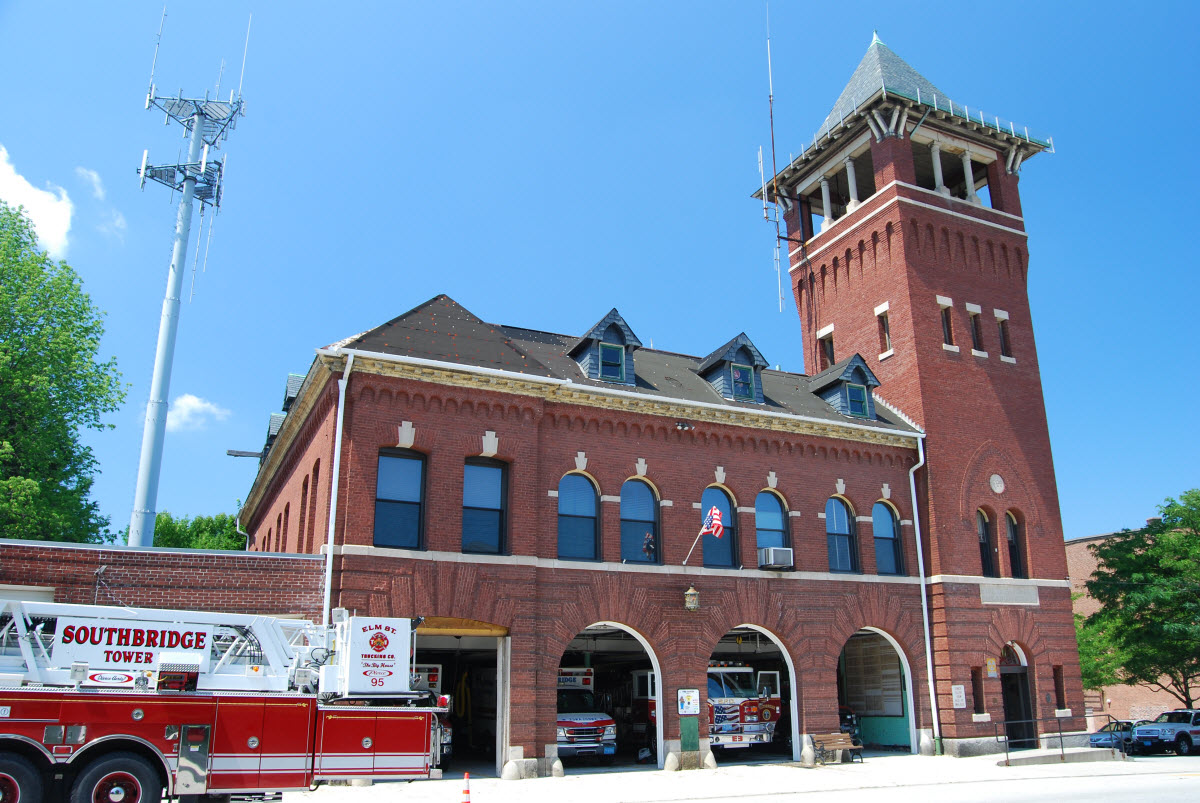

- Location within Massachusetts Location within the United States
- Location: 24 Elm St., Southbridge, Massachusetts
- Coordinates: 42°4′27″N 72°2′6″W
- Built: 1899
- Architect: Clemence, George H.
- Architectural style: Renaissance
- MPS: Southbridge MRA
- NRHP reference No.: 89000530
- Added to NRHP: June 22, 1989

The Elm Street Fire House is a historic fire house at 24 Elm Street in Southbridge, Massachusetts. Built in 1899, it was Southbridge's second fire house (after the Globe Village Fire House) to be built in the 1890s, and serves as the fire department headquarters. The station was listed on the National Register of Historic Places in 1989.

== Description and history ==
The Elm Street Fire House is located on the west side of Elm Street, just south of Main Street and Southbridge's main business district. It is a two-story brick structure, with a hip roof and a tall hose-drying tower at its northeast corner. The building is architecturally eclectic, exhibiting a mixture of Revival styles popular in the late 19th century. The tower is Italianate, with round-arch windows and a bracketed pyramidal roof with skirt. The equipment bays on the ground floor have rusticated brick voussoirs, shaping round-arch openings in three of the bays, and a segmented-arch opening in one. The second story has round-arch windows in its central bays, and rectangular sash windows at the southern end, all with keystones. Dormers in the hip roof have Gothic-arched gables. A single-story addition extends to the south, adding several more equipment bays.

Southbridge's fire services began with a tub engine owned by the Hamilton Woolen Mill Company, the city's dominant business. In 1832 the city acquired its own engine, and established a volunteer force to operate both units. The #1 unit occupied a variety of spaces in the center until 1860, when the first station was built. The fire department was formally established in 1880, and water was provisioned to hydrants in the city in the 1890s. Two stations were built in the 1890s: the Globe Village Fire House in 1894, and this one in 1899.

This station was designed by Worcester architect George H. Clemence, whose previous commissions included some of that city's fire houses. Clemence is also credited with other designs in Southbridge, where was known to maintain an office, but the bulk of his best-known work is in Worcester.

== See also ==
- National Register of Historic Places listings in Southbridge, Massachusetts
- National Register of Historic Places listings in Worcester County, Massachusetts
