= Green Hill Park Shelter =

- U.S. National Register of Historic Places
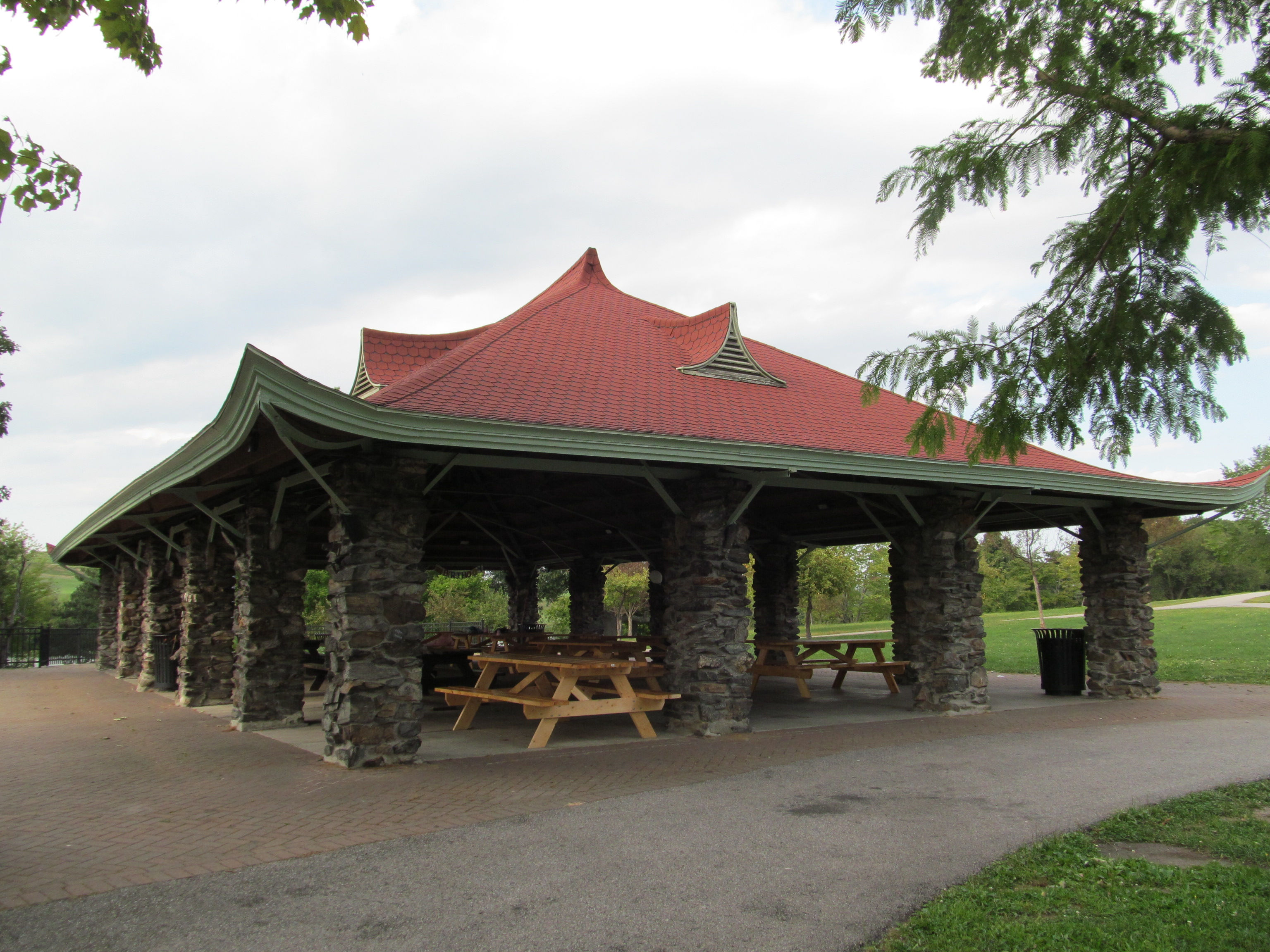
- Green Hill Park Shelter

- Location within Massachusetts Location within the United States
- Location: Green Hill Parkway, Worcester, Massachusetts
- Coordinates: 42°16′54″N 71°46′58″W
- Area: more than one acre
- Built: 1910
- Architect: Clemence, George H.
- Architectural style: Oriental
- MPS: Worcester MRA
- NRHP reference No.: 80000522
- Added to NRHP: March 05, 1980

The Green Hill Park Shelter is a historic picnic shelter in Green Hill Park, the largest city park of Worcester, Massachusetts. It was designed by architect George H. Clemence, and built in 1910-11. The building is the most architecturally sophisticated park pavilion in the city, and was listed on the National Register of Historic Places in 1980.

== Description ==
Green Hill Park is located in eastern Worcester, occupying about 480 acres (190 ha) of uplands separating the Blackstone River valley from Lake Quinsigamond. Near the center of the park is Green Hill Pond, a 30-acre (12 ha) artificial body of water. The shelter is located near the southeastern end of the lake, between it and Green Hill Parkway, the park's main circulating road. The shelter is an open structure, consisting of sixteen fieldstone piers supporting a hip roof with curved eaves and ridge. The roof has a metal support structure, but it is otherwise framed in wood. At its south end is an enclosed area designed for use as a concession stand. The roof's flared edges and projecting louvered dormers give it an Oriental feel.

The park was originally a country estate, given to the city by Andrew Green in 1906. None of the estate's original buildings have survived. The shelter is one of several buildings that were designed by local architects as part of its conversion to a public facility. It was designed by George H. Clemence, and completed in 1911.

== See also ==
- National Register of Historic Places listings in eastern Worcester, Massachusetts
