= George H. Clemence =

American architect (1865-1924)

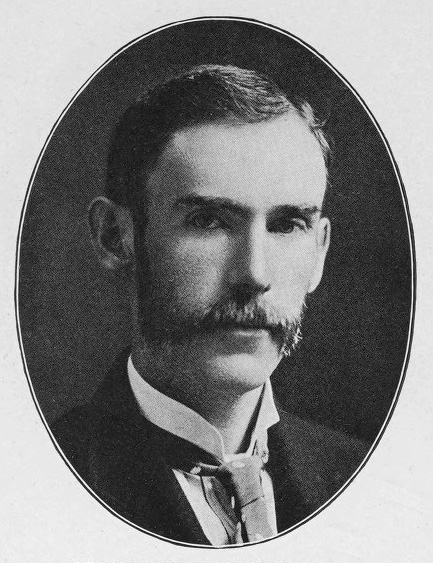
- George H. Clemence, c. 1903
- Born: January 13, 1865; Worcester, Massachusetts, U.S.
- Died: February 2, 1924 (aged 59); Worcester, Massachusetts, U.S.
- Resting place: Hope Cemetery
- Occupation: Architect
- Awards: Fellow, American Institute of Architects (1896)

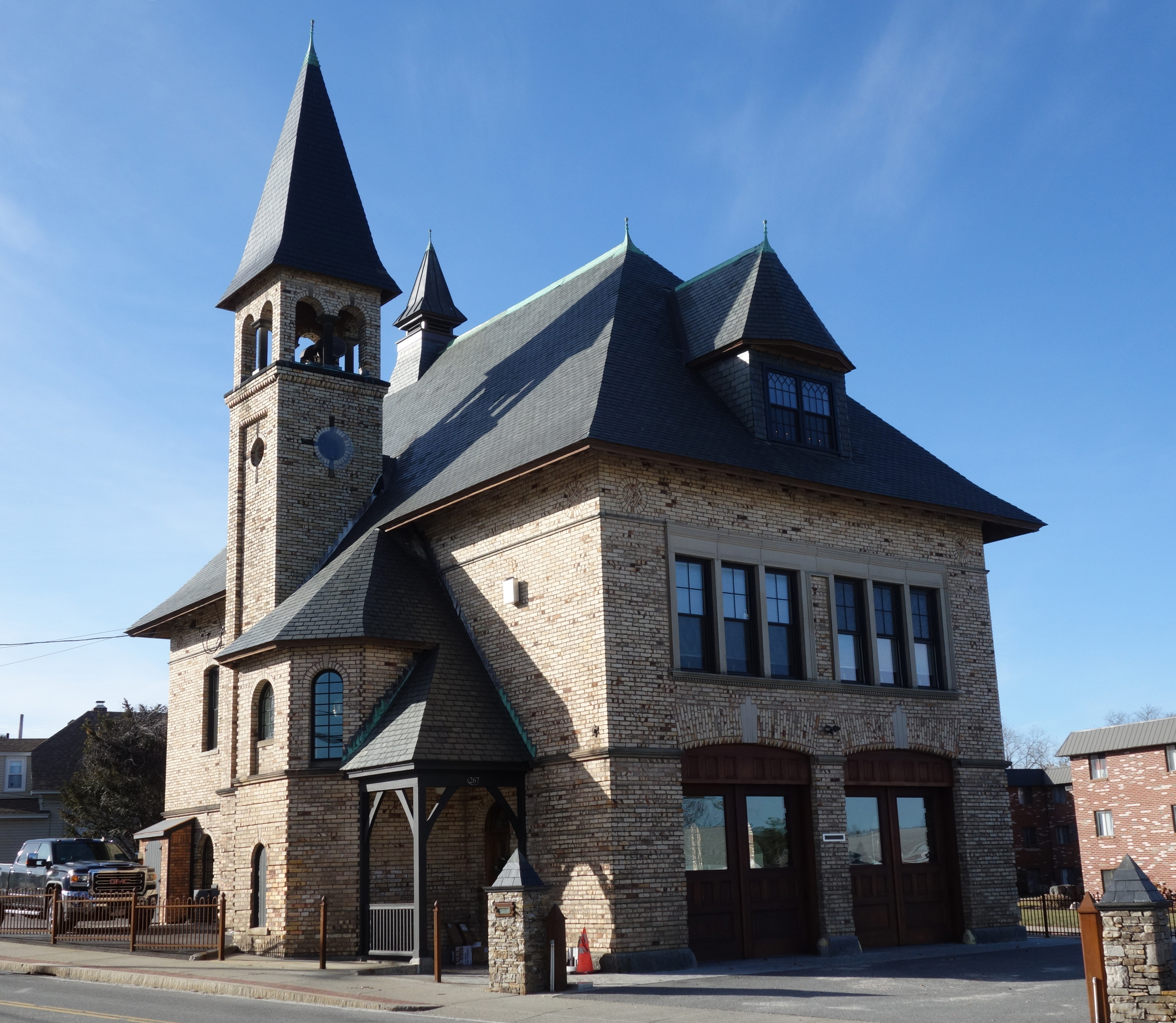
Bloomingdale Firehouse, Worcester, 1896

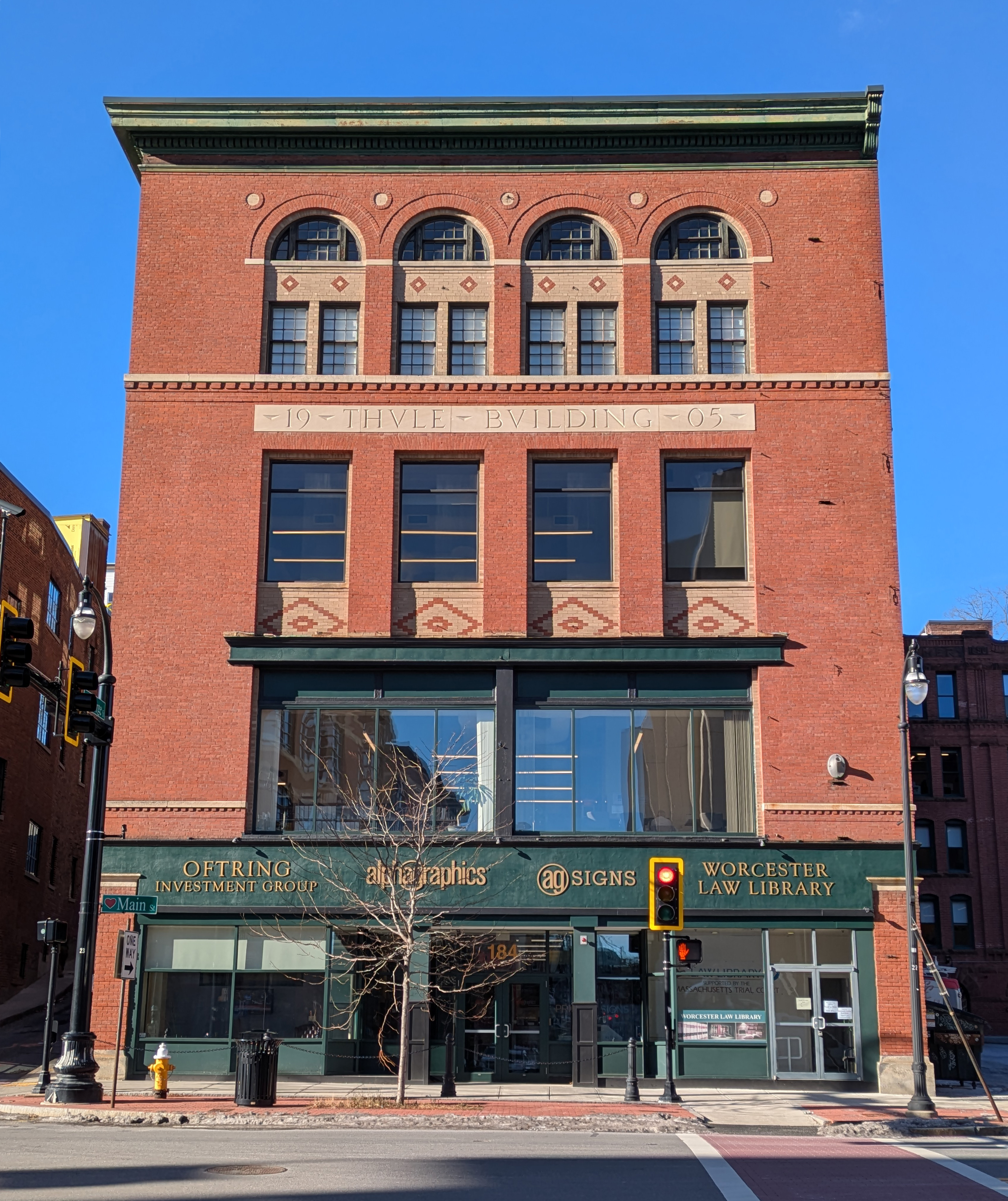
Thule Building, Worcester, 1905

George Henry Clemence (January 13, 1865 – February 2, 1924) was an American architect based in Worcester, Massachusetts, during the late nineteenth and early twentieth centuries. He designed public buildings, schools and private homes throughout central Massachusetts.

== Life and career ==
George Henry Clemence was born January 13, 1865, in Worcester, Massachusetts, to Richard H. Clemence, a carpenter and grocer, and Eva Clemence, née Osgood. He was educated in the Worcester public schools, but apparently did not graduate from high school, and entered the office of Worcester architect Stephen C. Earle in 1882. In 1886 he enrolled in the Massachusetts Institute of Technology as a special student in architecture. After completing his course he returned to Earle's office as chief drafter. In 1890 he left to join Darling Brothers, general contractors who had just completed Earle's Pleasant Street Baptist Church (1890), and two years later left to open an office of his own.

Clemence's best-known works were the central fire station of the Worcester Fire Department (1899, demolished) and the Waldo Street Police Station (1918, NRHP-listed), the former headquarters of the Worcester Police Department. Both buildings were based on Italian Renaissance palazzos. Clemence modeled his fire department headquarters on the Palazzo Vecchio in Florence, possibly following the lead of Edmund M. Wheelwright's design for the former headquarters of the Boston Fire Department (1894).

Worcester architect G. Adolph Johnson worked in Clemence's office.

== Personal life and death ==
He was married to Anna Eliza McDonald in 1889. They had a daughter, Hazel, in 1890, and lived in a secluded house on Appleton Road adjacent to the Fairlawn estate. He was a Mason, affiliated with the Athelstan lodge in Worcester, as well as a Royal Arch Mason. In 1896 he joined the American Institute of Architects (AIA) as a Fellow and is the most recent Fellow from Worcester. He served as the third and last president of the Worcester chapter of the AIA from the time of Stephen Earle's death in 1913 until 1917, when its four remaining members voted to dissolve the chapter and join the Boston Society of Architects.

In later life, Clemence's health declined. He died February 2, 1924, in Worcester at the age of 59. He was buried in Hope Cemetery in Worcester.

== Architectural works ==
A number of his works are listed on the National Register of Historic Places. They include:

In Worcester:

- Beacon Street Firehouse
- Bloomingdale Firehouse
- Dartmouth Street School
- Elizabeth Street School
- Harry Goddard House
- Green Hill Park Shelter
- Thule Building
- Upsala Street School
- Waldo Street Police Station

In Southbridge, Massachusetts:

- Elm Street Fire House
- LaCroix-Mosher House
