= Harry Goddard House =

Historic house in Massachusetts, United States

- U.S. National Register of Historic Places
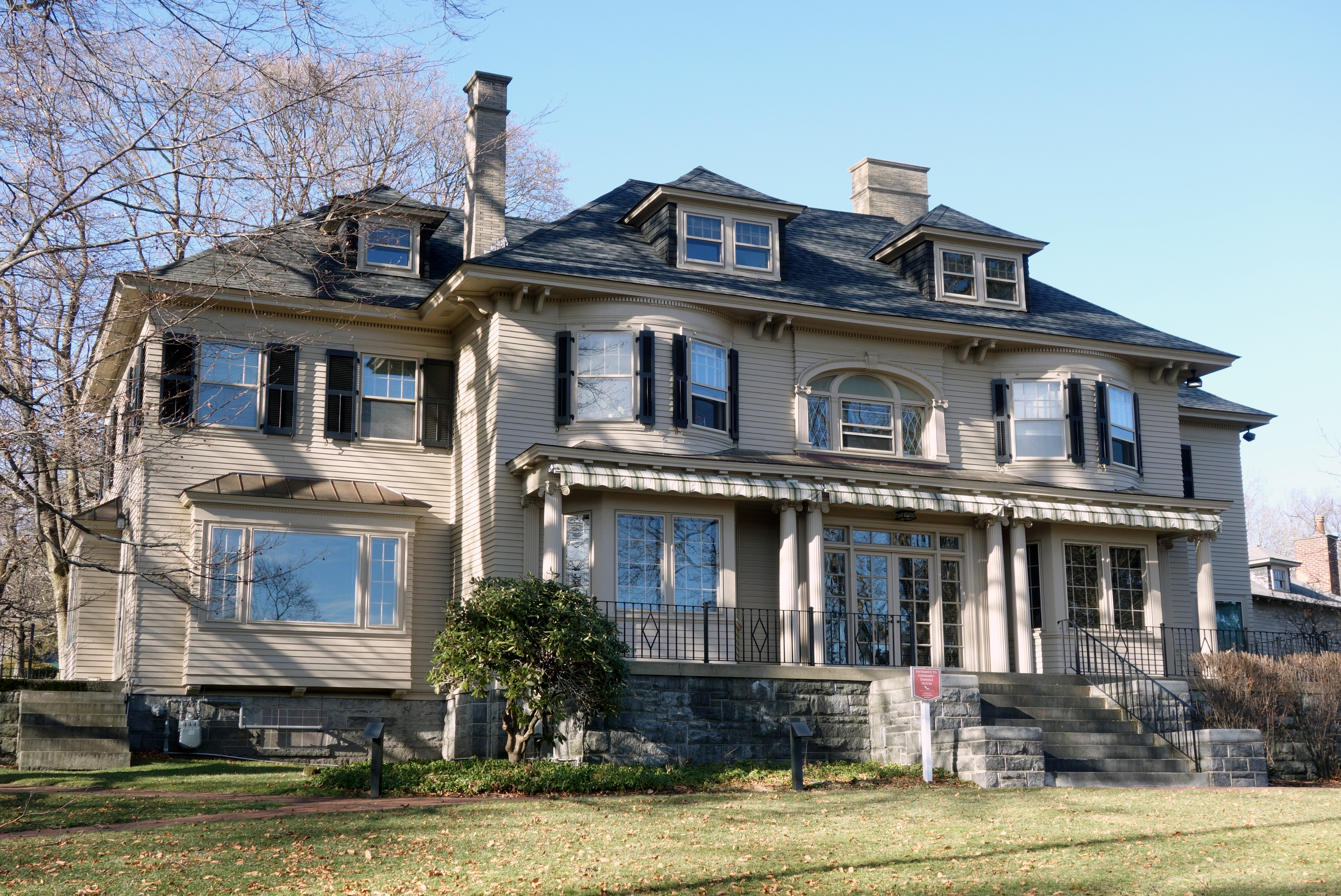

- Location within Massachusetts Location within the United States
- Location: 190 Salisbury St., Worcester, Massachusetts
- Coordinates: 42°16′43″N 71°48′35″W
- Area: 1 acre (0.40 ha)
- Built: 1905
- Architect: Clemence, George
- Architectural style: Colonial Revival
- MPS: Worcester MRA
- NRHP reference No.: 80000525
- Added to NRHP: March 5, 1980

The Harry Goddard House or Goddard-Daniels House is an historic house at 190 Salisbury Street in Worcester, Massachusetts. Built in 1905 for a local wire company executive, it is one of the city's finest examples of Colonial Revival architecture, and a significant residential design of local architect George Clemence. It was listed on the National Register of Historic Places in 1980 and has been owned by the American Antiquarian Society since 1981.

== Description and history ==
The Harry Goddard House is located northwest of downtown Worcester, at the northwest corner of Salisbury Street and Park Avenue. It is a large 2 1/2-story wood-frame structure, with a hip roof and clapboarded exterior. Its front facade faces east toward Park Avenue, with the center section projecting slightly. The projection has rounded window bays flanking the former main entrance, which is sheltered by a single-story porch extending across the entire projecting section. There is a Palladian window above the entrance. A new entrance, added about 1930, is located near the southwest corner of the building, sheltered by a rounded porch enclosed by French doors.

The house was designed by local architect George Clemence, and was built in 1905 for Harry Goddard, president of the Spencer Wire Company. The house was written up in a local magazine after its completion. Goddard, a prominent local businessman, entertained William Howard Taft, then the United States Secretary of War, at this house, which he named "Elmarion". At the time of its National Register listing in 1980, it remained in the hands of Goddard's descendants.

In 1970, the house was deeded with a life tenancy clause to the American Antiquarian Society, whose headquarters are across the street, by Eleanor Goddard Daniels. Following the death of Mrs. Daniels, the AAS assumed possession of the house. The AAS renovated the house for institutional use, and renamed it the Goddard-Daniels House.

== See also ==
- National Register of Historic Places listings in northwestern Worcester, Massachusetts
- National Register of Historic Places listings in Worcester County, Massachusetts
