= Thule-Plummer Buildings =

- U.S. National Register of Historic Places
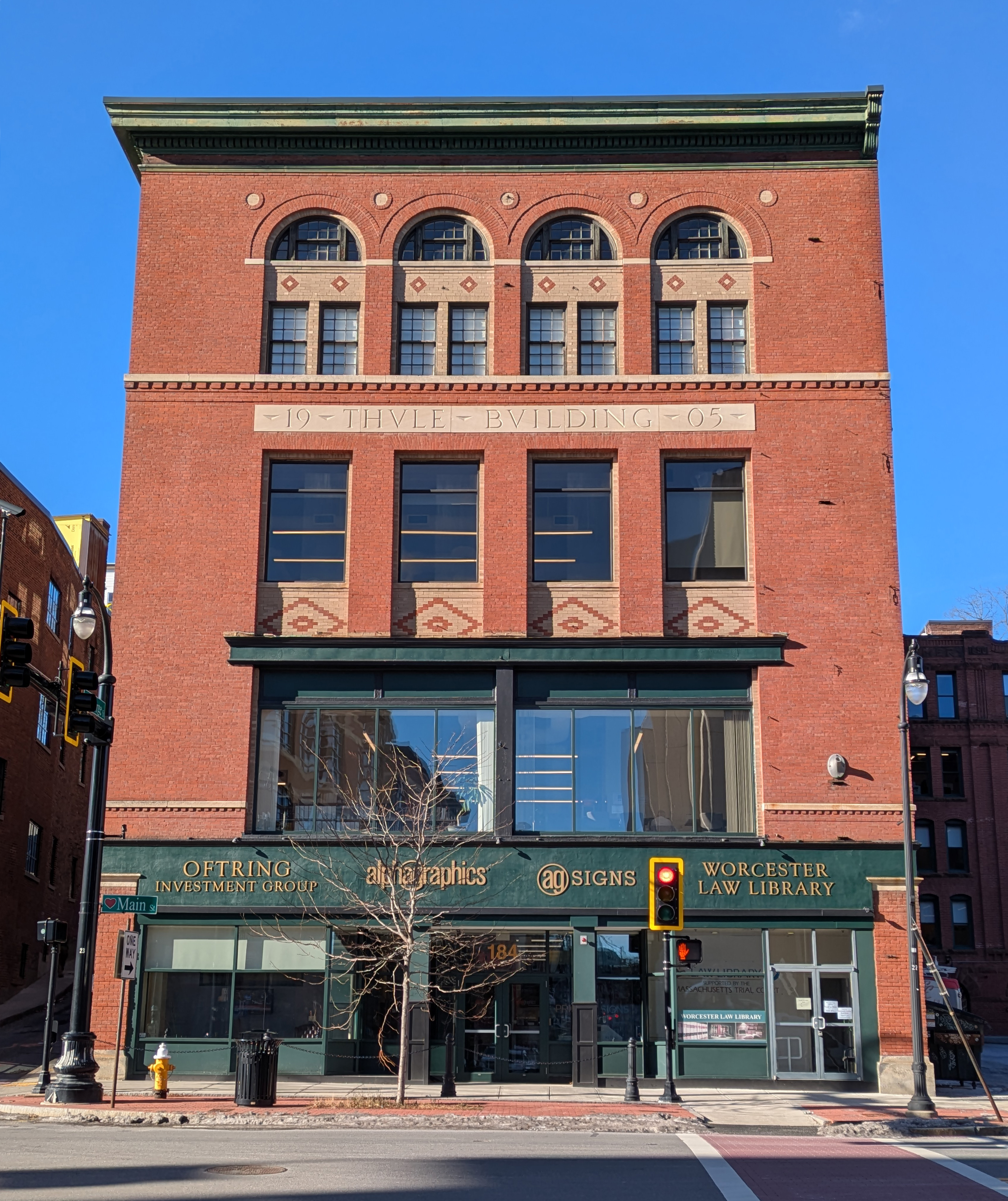
- Thule Building (George Clemence, 1905)

- Location within Massachusetts Location within the United States
- Location: 180-184 Main St., Worcester, Massachusetts
- Coordinates: 42°16′06″N 71°48′5″W
- NRHP reference No.: 11000019
- Added to NRHP: February 18, 2011

The Thule-Plummer Buildings are a pair of historic brick buildings at 180 and 184 Main Street just north of the main downtown area of Worcester, Massachusetts. The older of the two buildings is the Plummer Building, a five-story brick apartment house built in 1890. It is set back about 50 feet (15 m) from the street, and is set into a steep hillside on the west side of Main Street. A major addition was added to it in 1931, and it was connected to the Thule building by a three-story connector in 1930, although this connection has since been walled off. The Thule Building is a five-story brick building constructed in 1905 to a design by local architect George Clemence. It was built for the Thule Hall Music Association to function as a social center for the city's growing Swedish American community, and consisted of retail space on the ground floor, and three stories of function halls; the fifth floor was taken up by an internal dome over the fourth floor hall. The association was, however, unable to pay its mortgage, and lost the property by foreclosure in 1914. The new owners converted the space to commercial use, and it was occupied by a succession of furniture companies. The same owners purchased the Plummer building, which was converted to commercial use c. 1916.

The buildings were listed on the National Register of Historic Places in 2011. The buildings were rehabilitated in 2009, exposing some of the surviving interior decorations. The Thule Building now houses the Worcester Law Library in its upper floors.

== See also ==
- National Register of Historic Places listings in northwestern Worcester, Massachusetts
- National Register of Historic Places listings in Worcester County, Massachusetts
