= House at 21 Dartmouth Street =

Historic house in Massachusetts, United States

- U.S. National Register of Historic Places
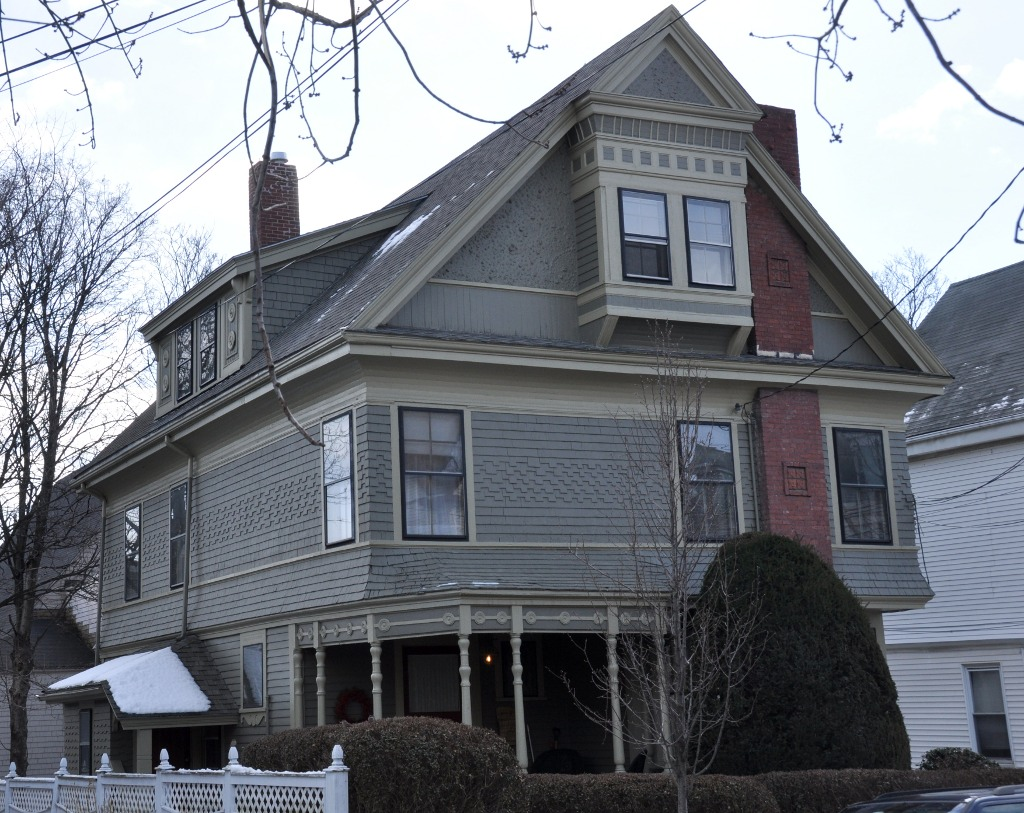

- Location within Massachusetts Location within the United States
- Location: Somerville, Massachusetts
- Coordinates: 42°23′27″N 71°5′50″W
- Built: 1890
- Architectural style: Queen Anne
- MPS: Somerville MPS
- NRHP reference No.: 89001255
- Added to NRHP: September 18, 1989

The house at 21 Dartmouth Street in Somerville, Massachusetts is a well preserved Queen Anne style house. The 2.5-story wood-frame house was built c. 1890, possibly for Rufus Stickney, one of the developers of the area during that time. Its most distinctive feature is the front gable end, which contains a projecting box with a pair of windows, supported by brackets and topped by an entablature. The upper floors also include bands of decoratively cut shingles.

The house was listed on the National Register of Historic Places in 1989.

== See also ==
- National Register of Historic Places listings in Somerville, Massachusetts
