= Two Chairmen =

Pub in Westminster, London

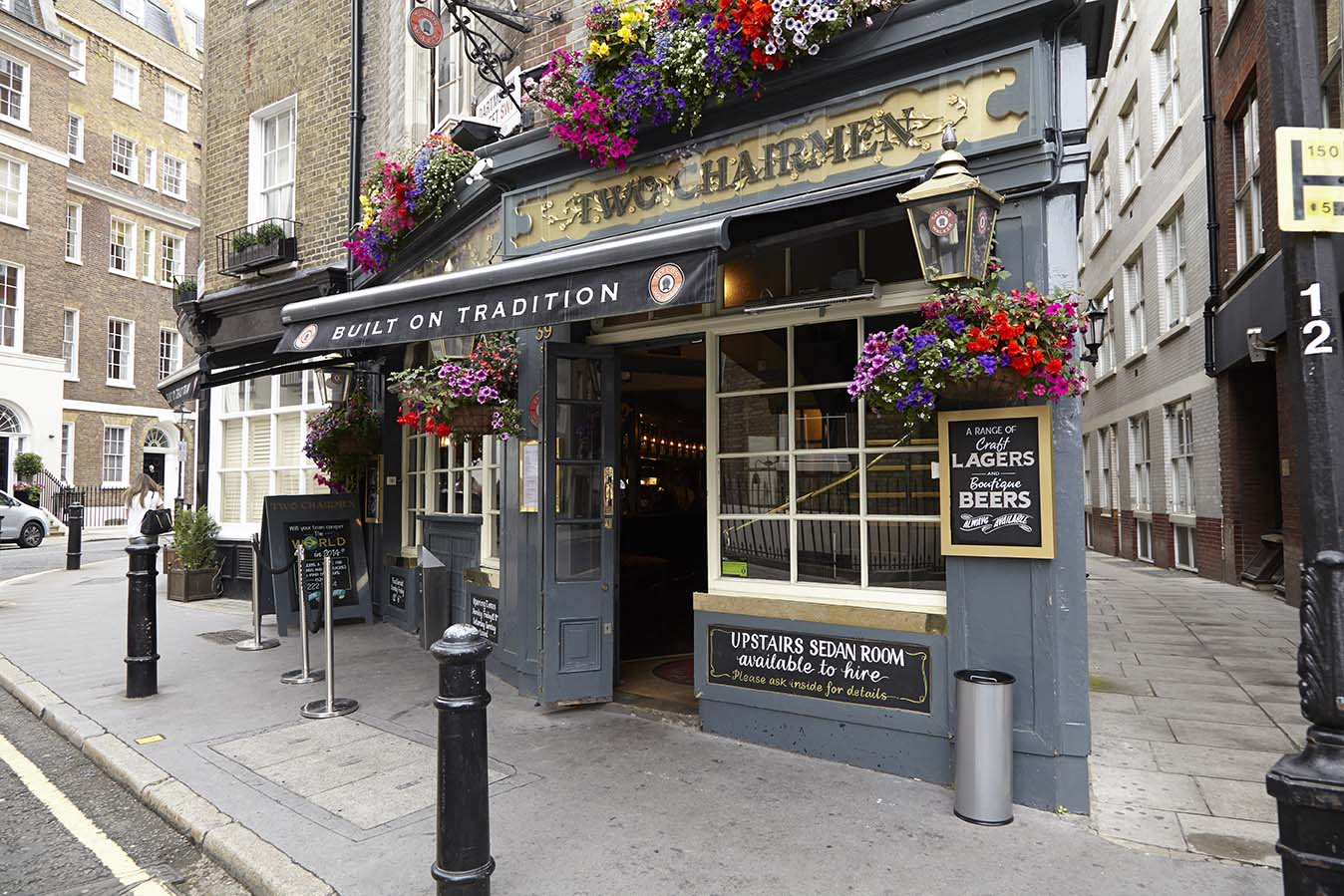
- The Two Chairmen pub in Westminster, London
- Interactive map of Two Chairmen
- 51.5006°N 0.1317°W
- Type: Public house
- Location: 1, WARWICK HOUSE STREET SW1

History
- Rebuilt: 1756

Listed Building – Grade II
- Official name: THE TWO CHAIRMEN PUBLIC HOUSE
- Designated: 1 December 1987
- Reference no.: 1066136

The Two Chairmen is thought to be the oldest public house in Westminster. Its pub sign, featuring two men carrying a sedan chair, can be traced back to 1729. The pub is near Birdcage Walk, where James I had aviaries for exotic birds, and close to St James's Park tube station. It has been called "the hidden gem of Dartmouth Street" by the London Evening Standard. It is a Grade II listed building.

== History ==
The pub is located on Dartmouth Street opposite the infamous early theatre The Royal Cockpit, which was known as a cockfighting arena. Rebuilt in 1756, it is named after the two men who used to carry sedan chairs for wealthy patrons who frequented the pub in its early days. Apparently the sedan chair carriers would wait in the pub for fares which would appear after the cockfights had finished.

In 1935, the pub was the location of the founding of the Society of Civil Service Authors.

== Notable clientele and mentions ==
- In 2007 Nigel Farage, leader of the UK Independence Party, gave an interview to The Daily Telegraph journalist Robert Watts.
- Political Editor for The Mail on Sunday, Simon Walters, first met former Northern Ireland Secretary Mo Mowlam at the Two Chairmen.
- The Two Chairmen is mentioned in a book by author John Rae entitled The Old Boys Network: A Headmaster's Diaries 1972-1986, where the author receives a call from the pub landlord to go and collect several drunk students.
- In a book entitled Betjeman by the author A. N. Wilson, the pub is mentioned in correspondence between John Betjeman and Eric James where Betjeman writes: "Wrong. The Two Chairmen is a pub near here. If you have the courage to say that you are very sorry, but you have to leave, I'll come with you and we can go to the Two Chairmen."
- Author Michael Dobbs mentions the Two Chairmen in his book A Sentimental Traitor where the character Jemma comments that the pub is "entirely presentable but scarcely The Ritz".
- The Two Chairmen appears in the opening number of the 2018 Disney movie, Mary Poppins Returns. Lin Manuel Miranda, as Jack, cycles past the pub whilst singing "(Underneath the) Lovely London Sky."
- The Two Chairmen appears in the 1997 film adaptation of the George Orwell novel Keep the Aspidistra Flying starring Richard E. Grant and Helena Bonham Carter.
- The Two Chairmen appears in the book Lethal White, by Robert Galbraith.
