= Dartmouth Street School =

- U.S. National Register of Historic Places
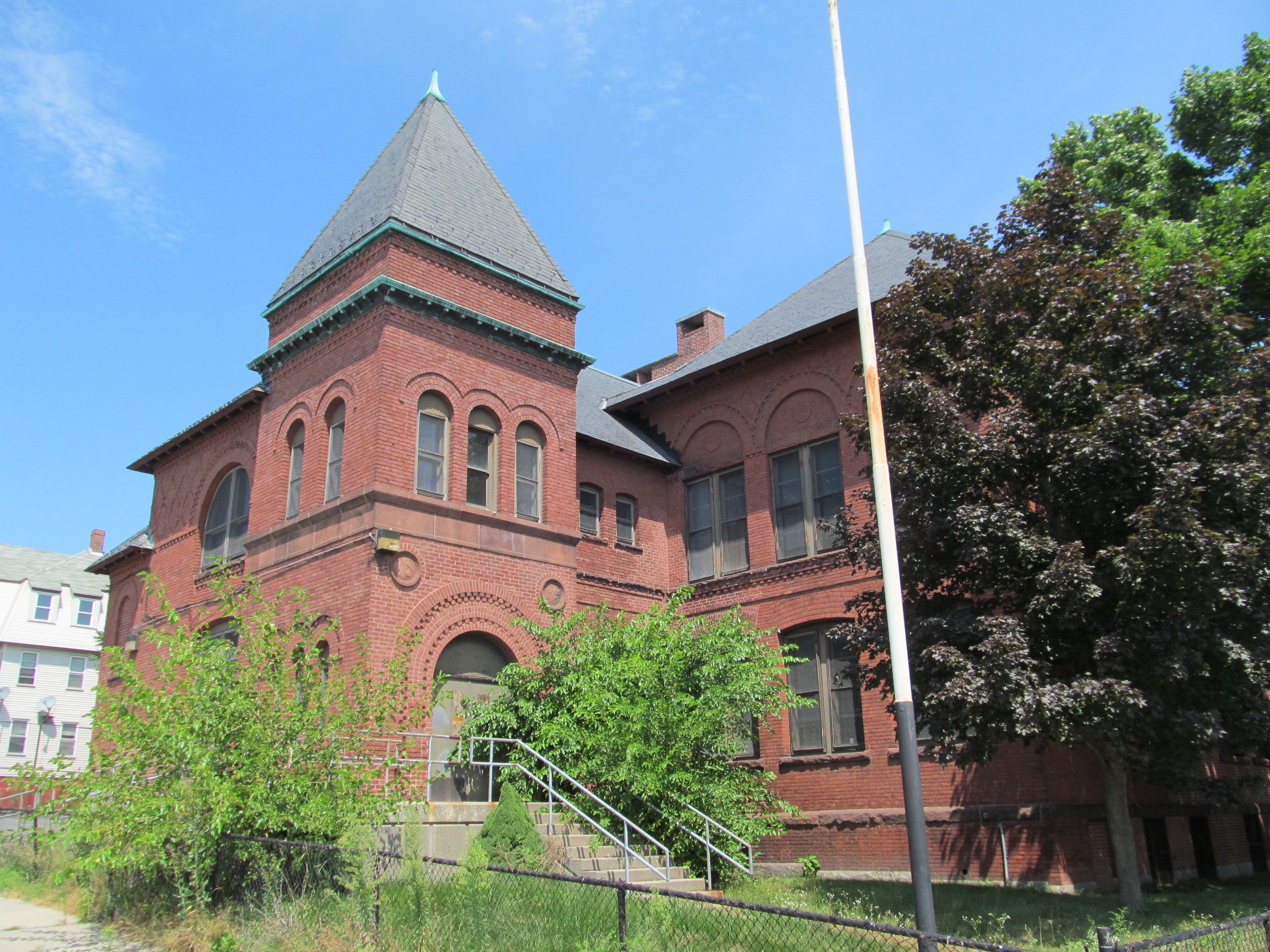
- Dartmouth Street School

- Location within Massachusetts Location within the United States
- Location: 13 Dartmouth St., Worcester, Massachusetts
- Coordinates: 42°15′28″N 71°46′52″W
- Built: 1894
- Architect: Clemence, George
- MPS: Worcester MRA
- NRHP reference No.: 80000546
- Added to NRHP: March 5, 1980

The Dartmouth Street School is a historic school building at 13 Dartmouth Street in Worcester, Massachusetts. Built in 1894 to a design by noted local architect George Clemence, it is a well-preserved architectural mix of Romanesque and other Late Victorian styles. The building was listed on the National Register of Historic Places in 1980. In 2008 a proposal was floated to convert the building into housing; as of 2012, it stood vacant.

== Description and history ==
The Dartmouth Street School is located in a residential area of southeastern Worcester, on a parcel bounded on the south by Dartmouth Street, the west by Almont Avenue, and the east by Ingleside Avenue. It is a two-story masonry structure, with an eclectic mix of stylistic elements in brick and sandstone. Its corner tower is Queen Anne in conception, but it houses a round-arch entrance opening, and grouped round-arch windows in the Romanesque style, before rising to its pyramidal roof. Its older portion has a hip roof, which is pierced by eyebrow dormers, while the newer portion has a flat roof.

The building was designed by local architect George Clemence, and built in two parts. The older, main portion, was built in 1894, and is nearly identical to the Elizabeth Street School, also a Clemence work. It was expanded to its rear in 1908 with a two-story addition that uses similar motifs to the main block, and was little altered thereafter. The neighborhood in which it was built experienced development of a large number of triple decker housing units, necessitating the expansion.

== See also ==
- National Register of Historic Places listings in eastern Worcester, Massachusetts
