= Elizabeth Street, Lexington =

Neighborhood in Lexington, Kentucky

Coordinates: 38.027°N 84.516°W

Elizabeth Street is a neighborhood in southwestern Lexington, Kentucky, United States. Its boundaries are Dantzler Drive to the south, Norfolk Southern railroad tracks to the west, South Limestone Street to the east, and Waller Avenue to the north.

Neighborhood statistics

- Area: 0.125 square miles (0.32 km^{2})
- Population: 794
- Population density: 6,357 people per square mile
- Median household income: $44,328
