= Elizabeth Street School =

- U.S. National Register of Historic Places
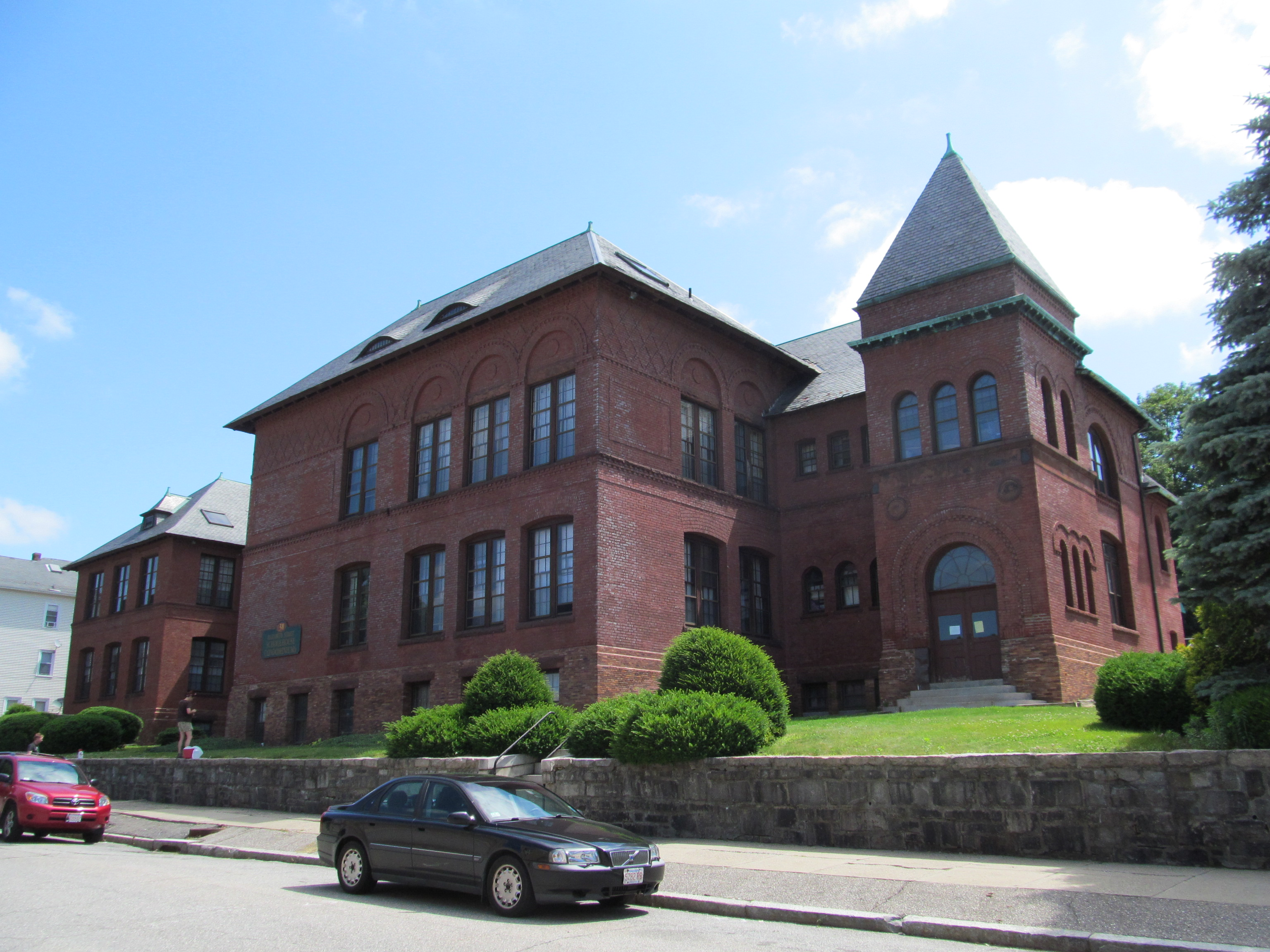
- Elizabeth Street School

- Location within Massachusetts Location within the United States
- Location: 31 Elizabeth St., Worcester, Massachusetts
- Coordinates: 42°16′12″N 71°47′29″W
- Built: 1893
- Architect: Clemence, George
- MPS: Worcester MRA
- NRHP reference No.: 80000589
- Added to NRHP: March 5, 1980

The Elizabeth Street School is a historic school building at 31 Elizabeth Street in Worcester, Massachusetts. Built in 1893, it was one of the first commissions for the city by local architect George Clemence, and is stylistically an eclectic mix of Romanesque and Renaissance Revival styles. The building was listed on the National Register of Historic Places in 1980. It has been converted into residences.

== Description and history ==
The former Elizabeth Street School is located in central eastern Worcester, in a residential area south of Massachusetts Route 9. It is bounded on the west by Elizabeth Street and the south by Reservoir Street. It is a two-story brick structure, consisting of two rectangular sections, the southern one larger than the northern, joined by a narrow section that continues south of the larger one. Square entry towers, capped by pyramidal roofs, project from these narrower sections. The largest section has a hip roof, from which eyebrow dormers project, while the smaller section, also with a hip roof, has a single hip-roof dormer. Entrances are set in round-arch openings in each tower, with tripled narrow round-arch windows above. A stringcourse of corbelled brickwork separates the two floors, and there is decorative paneled brickwork between the second floor and the roofline, with blind arches above some of the windows.

The school was built in 1893, when Worcester architect George Clemence was in the first year of what would be a highly successful practice. Unlike the Dartmouth Street School, another Clemence design, this school was not enlarged, probably because the neighborhood in which it was built was already completely built out at the time of its construction. The school has been converted to condominium residences.

== See also ==
- National Register of Historic Places listings in eastern Worcester, Massachusetts
