= Leary Firefighters Foundation =

The Leary Firefighters Foundation (LFF) provides funding and equipment to fire departments throughout the United States.

On December 3, 1999, six firefighters in Worcester, Massachusetts were killed in the Worcester Cold Storage and Warehouse fire, a massive fire set by squatters. Among the dead was the cousin of comedian Denis Leary, Firefighter Jerry Lucey, and his close childhood friend, Lt. Tommy Spencer. In response, the comedian founded the Leary Firefighters Foundation, which has since distributed over US$2.5 million to fire departments in the Worcester, Boston, and New York City areas for equipment, training materials, and new vehicles and facilities, since its creation in 2000. As of 2006, the LFF has donated $425,000 to the Boston Fire Department, including a fireboat.

As the foundation's president, Leary has been active in all of the fundraising, and usually presents large checks and donated equipment personally. The close relationship he has developed with the FDNY, as well as individual firefighters across the New York/New England area, has resulted in Leary's most recent television show, Rescue Me, a drama-comedy on FX about firefighters. In the pilot episode of the show, he is seen wearing a Leary Firefighter Foundation 9-11 memorial T-shirt.

A separate fund run by Leary's foundation, the Fund for New York's Bravest, has distributed over US$2 million to the families of the 343 firemen killed in the September 11, 2001 attacks, as well as provided funding for necessities such as a new mobile command center, first responder training, and a high-rise simulator for the New York City Fire Department's training campus.

After Leary learned that the New Orleans Fire Department members rescued 18,000 people from Katrina waters using NOFD members' personal boats, the Leary Foundation committed money to help purchase rescue boats for the NOFD. Of the 33 firehouses in New Orleans before the hurricane, at least 20 were so damaged by the disaster that they were unusable—yet firefighters stayed on the job—even when they had to sleep in their rigs, because their own homes were also damaged. The Leary Foundation is committing more money and resources to further address some of the needs of the NOFD and the people they serve.
