= Worcester Cold Storage and Warehouse Co. fire =

Fatal Massachusetts abandoned building fire (1999)

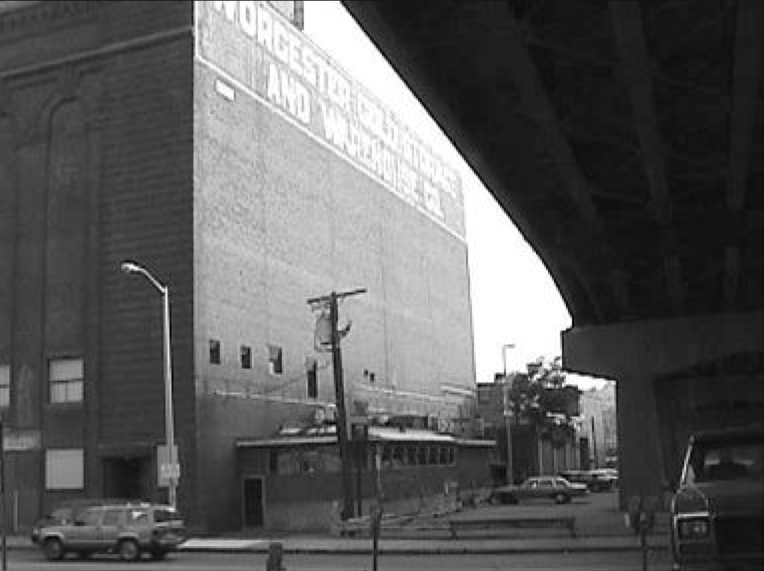
- Site of the fire, one year prior to the event
- Date: December 3, 1999
- Time: 6:13 pm EST (UTC−05:00)
- Location: Worcester Cold Storage and Warehouse Co., 266 Franklin Street, Worcester, Massachusetts; 42°15′36.23″N 71°47′34.17″W
- Also known as: Worcester Cold Storage
- Cause: Knocked-over candle
- Deaths: 6
- Accused: Thomas Levesque; Julie Ann Barnes
- Charges: 6 counts of involuntary manslaughter
- Verdict: Charges dismissed; 5 years probation in lieu
- Litigation: 6 wrongful death lawsuits pursued against building owners
- Awards: 2 plaintiffs accepted $166,667 each in out of court settlements 4 plaintiffs accepted $250,000 each in out of court settlements

The Worcester Cold Storage and Warehouse Co. fire began on December 3, 1999, in a 93-year-old abandoned building at 266 Franklin Street, Worcester, Massachusetts. The fire was started accidentally some time between 4:30–5:45 pm by two homeless people (Thomas Levesque and Julie Ann Barnes) who were squatting in the building and had knocked over a candle. They left the scene without reporting the fire. The 6-story building, previously used as a meat cold storage facility, had no windows above the ground floor and no fire detection or suppression systems. The fire, which started on the second story, burned undetected for 30–90 minutes.

The structure was five blocks east of the Worcester central business district, near Union Station and adjacent to Interstate 290. An off-duty police officer called in the fire at 6:13 pm after noticing grey/white smoke coming from the roof of the building. At around the same time an off-duty firefighter from neighboring Auburn passed the building on I-290 and radioed his Fire Control to report smoke coming from the roof. He told them to inform the Fire Chief "this is going to be a multiple-alarm fire."

Firefighters were unfamiliar with the layout of the building, and most of the floors inside — each up to 15,000 square feet (1,400 m^{2}) — were divided into a labyrinth of connecting meat lockers. The walls and many ceilings were covered with insulating layers of cork, tar, expanded polystyrene foam, and spray-applicated polyurethane foam. There were no fire walls or fire doors, and only a single staircase extended from the basement to the roof.

The owner of a neighboring business informed a police officer at the scene that a homeless couple had been squatting in the building and firefighters initiated a search, believing they could still be trapped inside. Conditions inside the building deteriorated rapidly. Worcester Fire Department District Chief Michael McNamee said: "There was a light smoke condition in the upper levels of the building to the point we didn't even have our face pieces on. Within four seconds it went from that condition to the building being filled completely with black, hot, boiling smoke." The layout of the building and the absence of windows left firefighters without a secondary escape route and prevented ladder and rescue operations. Six firefighters were still unaccounted for in the building when the interior floors collapsed to the second story level. They were the city's first firefighting deaths in 36 years.

== Worcester Cold Storage and Warehouse Co. ==
The Worcester Cold Storage and Warehouse Co. building was constructed in 1906 and covered an entire city block on Franklin Street. The original structure measured 88 by 88 feet (27 m × 27 m), and stood 80 feet (24 m) high. The warehouse was built to store western dressed beef from cattle slaughtered in the stock yards of Chicago, which could be shipped east in refrigerated rail cars at a lower cost than shipping livestock. The interior consisted of six storage levels and a basement. The warehouse was served by a rail siding to the rear, operated by the Boston and Albany Railroad.

To insulate the building, it was constructed with 18-inch-thick (46 cm) brick walls and had no windows above the first floor, except in the stairwell. The interior walls were covered with layers of cork impregnated with tar, polystyrene foam and polyurethane to improve insulation. The insulating layers were up to 18 inches (46 cm) thick. Two elevator shafts ran alongside the stairwell. The first and second story floors were constructed of concrete, and those above were constructed of timber. In 1912, the building was extended on the west side. The extension almost doubled the floor space and included two further elevators serving all levels, a second stairwell which terminated at the 3rd floor, and some windows in an office space on the north-east corner of the 2nd floor.

Between 1906 and 1983, the building was owned by the Worcester Cold Storage and Warehouse Co. In 1983, it was sold to Chicago Dressed Beef. It was purchased by CDB Realty Trust, controlled by Ding On "Tony" Kwan and his wife Shu May Kwan, in 1987. The building was abandoned by 1989 and remained vacant until its destruction, though Kwan had proposed several re-use cases for the property. During this period, it was frequently used by homeless persons, who built fires inside for warmth.

== Fire ==
Reports that homeless people were possibly inside the engulfed warehouse caused fire-rescue personnel to search the six-story building. The searchers' task was made extremely difficult by the large size of the building's interior, the layout, which was a maze of corridors and meat lockers, many with identical flush-handle doors, and the highly flammable composition of its insulation. Nearly a century old, the interior walls had been progressively covered with various forms of insulating materials, including cork impregnated with tar, polystyrene foam, and polyurethane foam, to a thickness of 18 inches. Once ignited, the large amount of fuel, fed initially by the large volume of air in the building, became virtually inextinguishable.

The six-story building's exterior walls were constructed of approximately 18 inches of brick and mortar, with no windows above the second floor. The lack of windows prevented firefighting personnel from making an accurate assessment of the fire. Breaching the lower-floor doors, combined with venting the building by smashing an elevator-shaft roof skylight, effectively turned the building into a huge chimney. With the fire accelerating out of control, rescue teams facing near-zero visibility became lost and air cylinders depleted. After repeated radio calls for help, along with activation of audible location alarms, six firefighters perished in the blaze. It took eight days to find and recover the remains of the six men.

=== Timeline ===
Time	Incident
6:13 PM	The first alarm is dispatched, fire alarm box 1438, Franklin and Arctic.
6:16 PM	Engine 1 arrives on location reporting they have heavy smoke showing.
6:17 PM	Car 3 requests the 2nd alarm be struck.
6:20 PM	Ladder 1 reports fire on the second floor, and has multiple 2 1/2-inch lines being put in service for the suppression efforts.
6:24 PM	Fire Alarm tells command that they have a report that a nearby business owner told a police officer that there "may be two people that live in that building."
6:32 PM	Car 3 asks Rescue 1 if they have checked on the rumor of the two homeless people. Rescue 1 reports they have made a preliminary search, and haven't found anyone.
6:40 PM	Car 2 requests the 3rd alarm be struck.
6:46 PM	Rescue 1 reports to command that they are lost on the fourth floor and they are running out of air.
6:47 PM	Rescue 1 calls Fire Alarm asking them to clear the air and stating that they have an emergency.
6:47 PM	The Fire Alarm dispatcher sounds the alert tones.
6:52 PM	Car 2 requests the 4th alarm be struck and Chief Budd notified.
6:53 PM	Car 3 directs Rescue 1 to activate their Personal Alert Safety Systems (PASS devices) to aid the other companies in locating them.
6:55 PM	"They are activated," referring to the PASS devices. This is the last audible transmission from Rescue 1.
7:04 PM	Ladder 2/Portable 2 asks Portable 1 his location. Portable 1 replies, "Good question." They are now lost with Engine 3 on the fifth floor.
7:08 PM	Ladder 2 requests for the Chief to send a crew to the stairwell and yell, so they can find it. They also report they are running low on air.
7:15 PM	"Ladder 2 to command: we're done..." This is the last transmission of the four man search team from Ladder 2/Engine 3.
7:26 PM	Car 1 requests the 5th alarm be struck.
7:31 PM	The Millbury Fire Department comes on mutual aid to the scene. They bring a thermal imaging camera with them, to be used to assist in locating the missing firefighters.
7:53 PM	Car 4 reports the thermal imager has stopped working.
7:58 PM	Car 3 signals for all companies to evacuate the building.

=== Deaths ===
Rank	Name	Age	Hometown	Company
Firefighter	Paul Brotherton	41	Auburn, Massachusetts	Rescue 1
Lieutenant*	Timothy Jackson	51	Hopedale, Massachusetts	Ladder 2
Firefighter	Jeremiah Lucey	38	Leicester, Massachusetts	Rescue 1
Lieutenant*	James Lyons	34	Worcester, Massachusetts	Engine 3
Firefighter	Joseph McGuirk	38	Worcester, Massachusetts	Engine 3
Lieutenant	Thomas Spencer	42	Worcester, Massachusetts	Ladder 2

These are known as the "Worcester Six".

* Lyons and Jackson both received a posthumous promotion from Firefighter to Lieutenant.

== Criminal charges ==
Involuntary manslaughter charges against Levesque and Barnes were initially dismissed, reinstated on appeal, and finally dismissed in January 2010. They received probation. Ding On "Tony" Kwan, the building's owner, was not charged, but families of the deceased firefighters sued him for wrongful death for negligently failing to keep out squatters. The families received between $166,667 and $250,000 each from Kwan in out-of-court settlements.

== Memorials ==
Memorial at the Franklin Street Fire Station in Worcester

A memorial service and procession for the firefighters were held in Worcester's Centrum Centre on December 9, 1999. The service was broadcast on several national news networks and was attended by President Bill Clinton, Vice President Al Gore, Senator Ted Kennedy and Senator John Kerry (who flew non-stop from Burma, where he had been attending a diplomatic function). Also in the procession were firefighters from around the United States, Canada, and from Dublin, Ireland. The Boston Stock Exchange suspended business at 11:00 am during the memorial and observed a minute's silence while a bell was rung in tribute on the trading floor.

City leaders planned to erect a memorial to the men in Institute Park, adjacent to the Worcester Fire Headquarters station on Grove Street. The Franklin Street Fire Station, officially opened November 19, 2008, sits on the land formerly occupied by the cold storage facility, which was demolished immediately after the fire investigation. A memorial to the fallen firefighters, created by artist Brian P. Hanlon, is also located at this site. Also, a banner hangs from the rafters in the DCU Center to commemorate the Worcester 6; it was raised by the Worcester Sharks AHL team on December 3, 2009.

On November 12, 2019, the then-new Triple-A affiliate of Major League Baseball's Boston Red Sox, the Worcester Red Sox, announced they would preemptively retire uniform number 6 in honor of the six men who died. Additionally, the team sells jerseys featuring "Worcester 6" on the back, with portion of the proceeds going to a memorial care fund.

== Leary Firefighters Foundation ==
Actor and comedian Denis Leary's first cousin, Jerry Lucey, and Leary's childhood friend and high school classmate, Lieutenant Tommy Spencer, were both victims of the fire. Leary established The Leary Firefighters Foundation in the spring of 2000. In October 2000, Leary held the first "Celebrity Hat Trick" fundraiser including a hockey game, a golf tournament and a dinner. The hockey game was played at Worcester Centrum between a "Hollywood" team, including Michael J. Fox, Kiefer Sutherland, Tim Robbins and Rick Moranis, and a Boston Bruins Alumni Team, coached by Bobby Orr and including Phil Esposito, Johnny Bucyk, Derek Sanderson and Cam Neely. The hockey game raised $350,000 and became an annual event. The proceeds went to Worcester and central Massachusetts fire departments to fund equipment, technology, and training, and to the families of firefighters who died or were injured in the line of duty.

== Film adaptation ==
In July 2000, journalist Sean Flynn's article about the fire, "The Perfect Fire", was published in Esquire magazine. Flynn's subsequent book, 3000 Degrees: The True Story of a Deadly Fire and The Men Who Fought It, was published in 2002.

Warner Bros. planned to use the book as the basis for a movie, with a screenplay written by Scott Silver, a Worcester native. Director Michael Mann was attached to the project, but left in February 2003, possibly as a result of the "slow-moving pre-production process." In September 2003, Warner Bros. hired director Danny Boyle to shoot the project, provisionally titled Worcester Cold Storage. Filming was expected to begin in early 2004 with an autumn 2004 release date.

Filming was scheduled to begin May 10, 2004, in Toronto, with Ed Harris and Woody Harrelson signed to star in the movie. Firefighters across North America protested that it was insensitive to make a film about fallen firefighters while their children were still young, and Worcester Fire Fighters IAFF Local 1009 wrote to other firefighters asking them not to participate in the movie's production. This resulted in the production company being unable to procure agreements in the United States or Canada to allow the use of firefighter insignia, while Canadian firefighters refused to act as extras and fire departments in the Toronto metropolitan area refused to lease firetrucks to the company.

In late April 2004, Warner Bros. and Image Entertainment, the production company, issued a joint statement saying that the making of a film the size and scope of Worcester Cold Storage was "a complex process that needed the support of various groups and individuals, including firefighters. Due to circumstances beyond our control, we no longer have such support. We have therefore decided not to move ahead with this project at this time." Frank Raffa, president of Local 1009, responded that firefighters "may one day drop their opposition" to the movie, "But we want to wait until the kids of our fallen comrades grow up."

=== Ladder 49 ===
The 2004 movie Ladder 49, directed by Jay Russell, told the story of a fictional Baltimore firefighter who is trapped inside a warehouse fire, and his recollection of the events that got him to that point. The film, starring Joaquin Phoenix and John Travolta, was based on the events of the Worcester fire. The Boston Herald wrote:

Ladder 49 isn't the movie that Hollywood threatened to make about the Worcester cold storage fire; opposition from the fallen firefighters' friends and family put the kibosh on "3,000 Degrees" last year. But those who were affected by the Worcester fire would do well to avoid this DVD anyway. It opens with firefighters attacking a large blaze in a tall, narrow, windowless structure. On a report that vagrants might be trapped in the otherwise deserted building, the firefighters search deep into its inner maze. As the fire grows more intense, one of them is trapped and apparently doomed. This is Baltimore, not Worcester, and the building is a grain elevator. But the parallels – including the immediate visual one – are creepy. The movie hardly justifies what pain it might cause.

== See also ==
- List of the deadliest firefighter disasters in the United States
