= Thomas Lumb Three-Decker =

Thomas Lumb Three-Decker may refer to:

- Thomas Lumb Three-Decker (Dewey Street), Worcester, Massachusetts
- Thomas Lumb Three-Decker (Winfield Street), Worcester, Massachusetts
