= George Fontaine Three-Decker =

- U.S. National Register of Historic Places
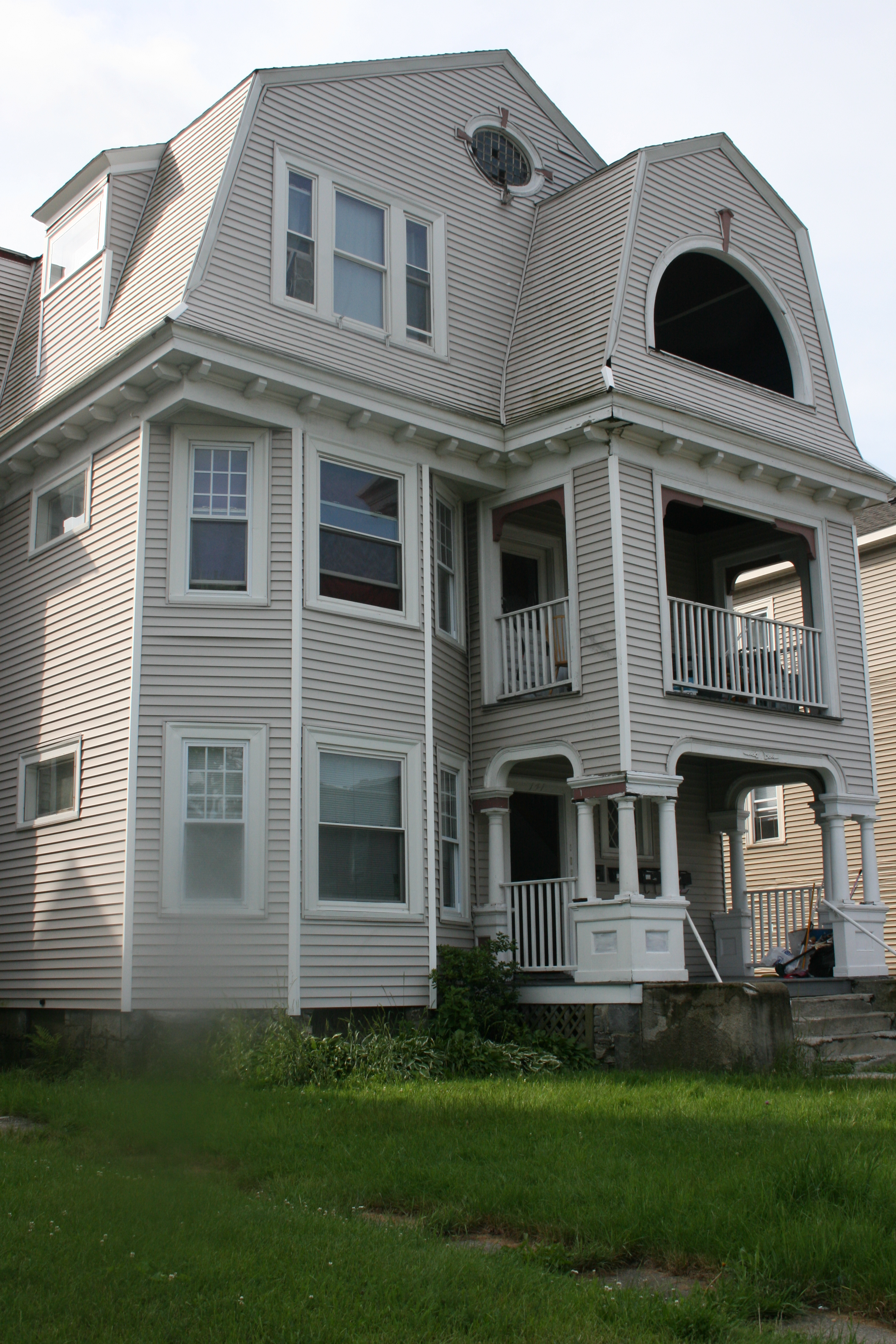

- Location within Massachusetts Location within the United States
- Location: 141 Vernon St., Worcester, Massachusetts
- Coordinates: 42°14′40″N 71°47′47″W
- Built: 1918
- Architectural style: Colonial Revival
- MPS: Worcester Three-Deckers TR
- NRHP reference No.: 89002447
- Added to NRHP: February 9, 1990

The George Fontaine Three-Decker is a historic triple decker in Worcester, Massachusetts. It was built c. 1918, and is a well-preserved example of the Colonial Revival styling. It was listed on the National Register of Historic Places in 1990.

== Description and history ==
The George Fontaine Three-Decker is located in southeastern Worcester's Vernon Hill neighborhood, on the east side of Vernon Street opposite its junction with Windham Street. It is a three-story wood-frame structure, with gambrel roof and clapboarded exterior. Its three-level porch projects significantly from the front, and is differently styled on each level. Its first tier has multiple Tuscan columns, the second has supports enclosed in siding, and the third level has a semicircular opening under a gambreled roof. The main roof is also gambreled, with a circular window near the apex, and modillion blocks in the eaves. Beside the porch stack on the lower two levels is a polygonal window bay, while there is a three-part picture window on the third level. Shed-roof dormers project on the steep side faces, and some side windows feature diamond-pattern panes.

The house was built about 1918, when Vernon Hill was being developed as a streetcar suburb with high-quality multi-unit housing. George Fontaine, its owner until 1930, was an inspector. Its early tenants included clothing dealers, a machinist, and timekeeper.

== See also ==
- National Register of Historic Places listings in eastern Worcester, Massachusetts
