= Catharine Roynane Three-Decker =

- U.S. National Register of Historic Places
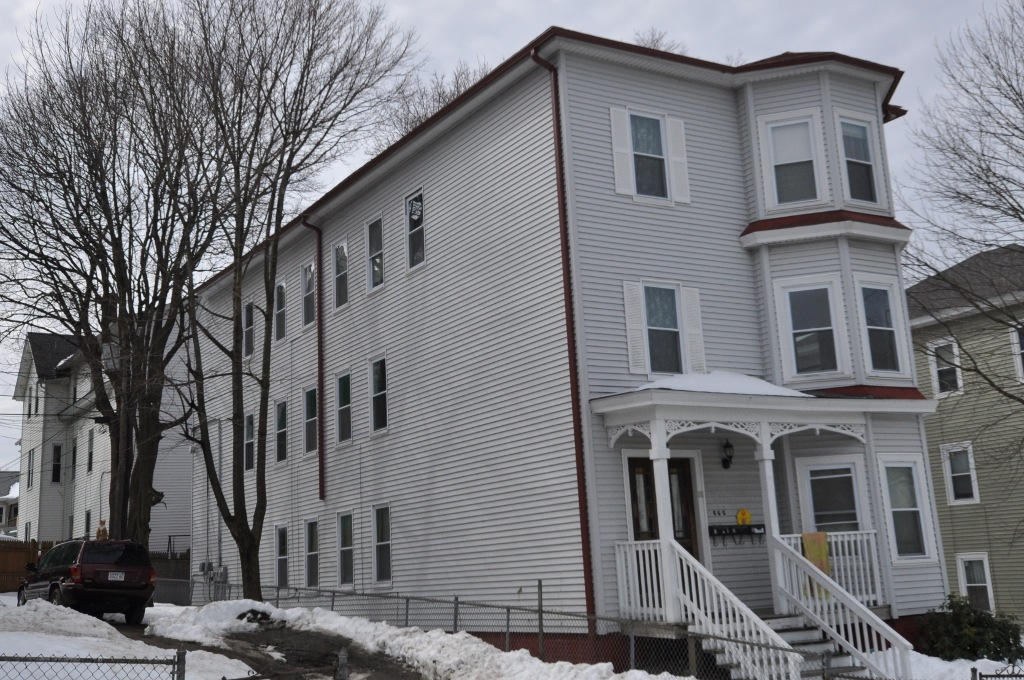

- Location within Massachusetts Location within the United States
- Location: 18 Ingalls St., Worcester, Massachusetts
- Coordinates: 42°15′15″N 71°47′44″W
- Area: less than one acre
- Built: c. 1890
- Architectural style: Queen Anne
- MPS: Worcester Three-Deckers TR
- NRHP reference No.: 89002397
- Added to NRHP: February 9, 1990

The Catharine Roynane Three-Decker (also spelled Ronayne) is a historic triple decker house in Worcester, Massachusetts. It was built c. 1890, and is a well-preserved local example of the form with Queen Anne styling. The house was listed on the National Register of Historic Places in 1990.

== Description and history ==
The Catharine Roynane Three-Decker is located southeast of downtown Worcester, on the south side of Ingalls Street in the city's Oak Hill neighborhood. It is a three-story wood frame structure, with a hip roof and exterior finished in modern siding. The front facade is asymmetrical, with a full-height projecting polygonal window bay on the right, and the main entrance on the left. The upper floors of the projecting bays have short skirts. The entrance is sheltered by a porch extending across the bay's width, with a decorative wooden frieze below the roof between its square posts. The building originally had other period details, including bracketing in the eaves and vertical board finish on the projecting bay, but these have been lost or obscured due to the application of modern siding.

The house was built about 1890, early in the development of Oak Hill as a streetcar suburb serving workers in the city's downtown and southern factories. Catherine Ronayne was the first documented owner; tenants in the early decades include a machinist, firefighter, and shoe factory worker.

== See also ==
- National Register of Historic Places listings in eastern Worcester, Massachusetts
