= Building at 51 Hunt Street =

Historic house in Massachusetts, United States

- U.S. National Register of Historic Places
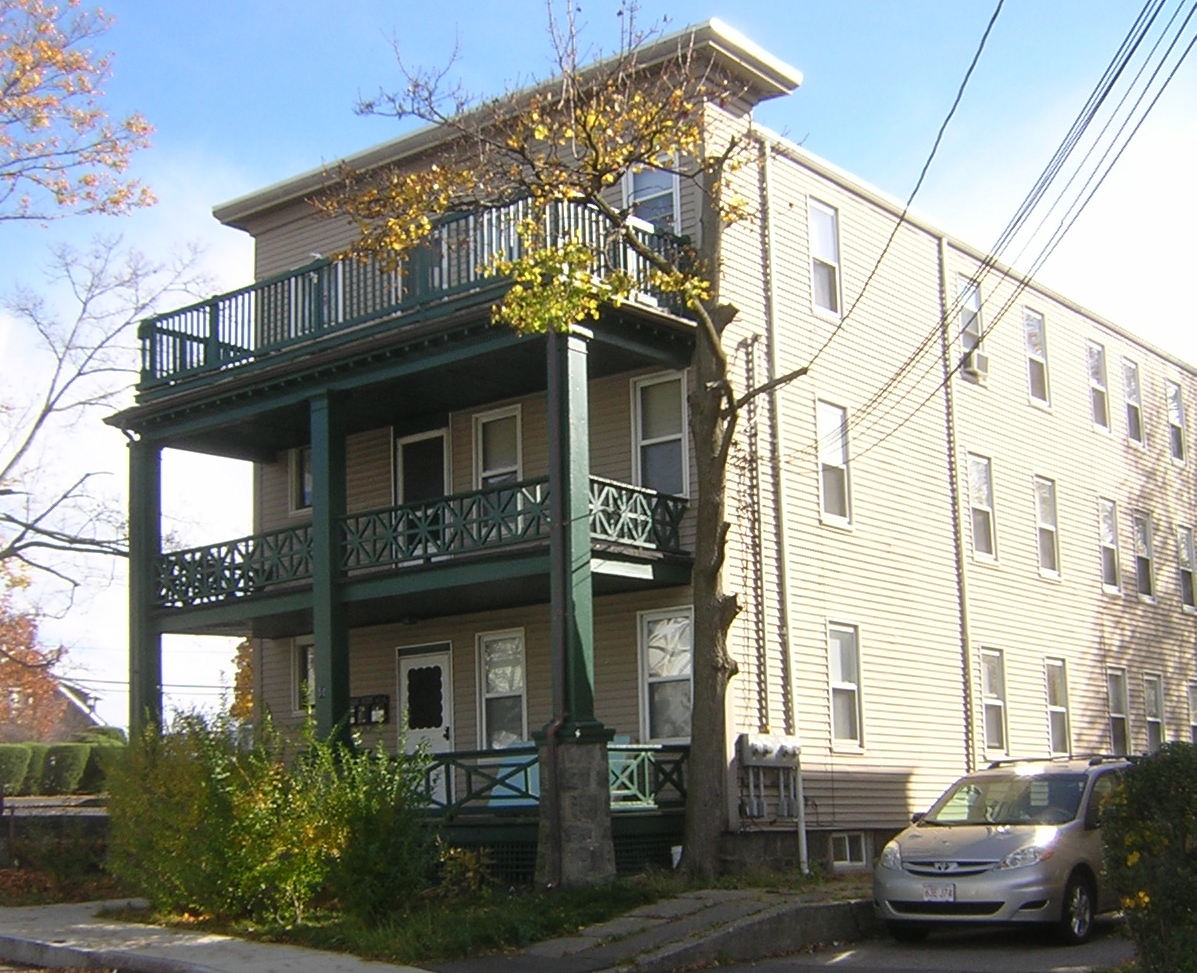

- Location within Massachusetts Location within the United States
- Location: 51 Hunt St., Quincy, Massachusetts
- Coordinates: 42°16′41″N 71°1′40.5″W
- Area: 0.1 acres (0.040 ha)
- Architectural style: Italianate
- MPS: Quincy MRA
- NRHP reference No.: 89001355
- Added to NRHP: September 20, 1989

The Building at 51 Hunt Street in Quincy, Massachusetts, is one of a relatively small number of triple decker apartment buildings in the city. Built in 1907 by Charles Stratton as part of his development of North Quincy as a rail-commuter suburb, it is a three-story wood-frame structure, with a flat roof and wooden clapboard siding. The building is notable for its high parapet and its unusual porch balustrades. The roof line has a cornice with dentil moulding and simple brackets.

The building was listed on the National Register of Historic Places in 1989.

== See also ==
- National Register of Historic Places listings in Quincy, Massachusetts
