= Erick Kaller Three-Decker =

- U.S. National Register of Historic Places
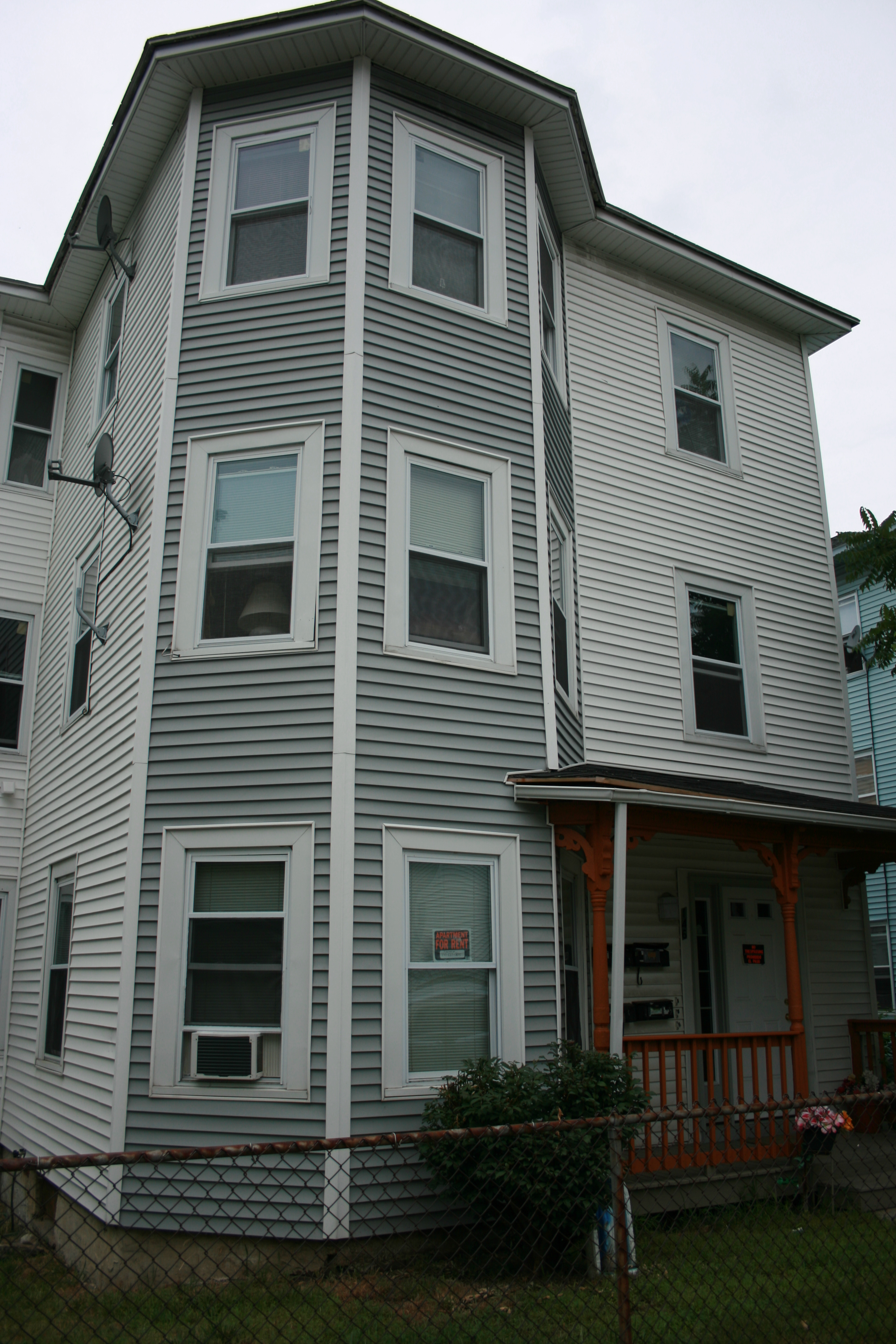
- 146 Eastern Avenue

- Location within Massachusetts Location within the United States
- Location: 146 and 148 Eastern Ave., Worcester, Massachusetts
- Coordinates: 42°16′25″N 71°47′22″W
- Area: less than one acre
- Built: c. 1894
- Architectural style: Queen Anne
- MPS: Worcester Three-Deckers TR
- NRHP reference No.: 89002411, 89002413
- Added to NRHP: February 9, 1990

There are two triple decker apartment houses built by Erick Kaller in Worcester, Massachusetts. They are in Worcester's east side Belmont Avenue neighborhood on the west side of Eastern Avenue north of Belmont Avenue. Both were built about 1894 in the Queen Anne style and were originally nearly identical. They are wood-frame buildings, covered by hip roofs, and having a conventional side hall plan with a projecting side jog. The front facades are asymmetrical, with projecting polygonal bay windows on the left side, and a single-story porch sheltering the entrance on the right. The principal difference between the two is that 148 Eastern has flared siding skirts below its projecting bay windows, while 146 has plain siding. Both have lost some of their styling due to subsequent exterior alterations, including the application of modern siding.

The houses were part of a series built on Eastern Avenue about 1894, a period of rapid growth in the area. Most of the residents were Scandinavian immigrants, employed in wire and steel factories on the city's north side. Kaller was a worker in a local wire factory and lived at #146. The Kaller family retained ownership of both buildings through the 1920s. They were listed separately on the National Register of Historic Places in 1990.

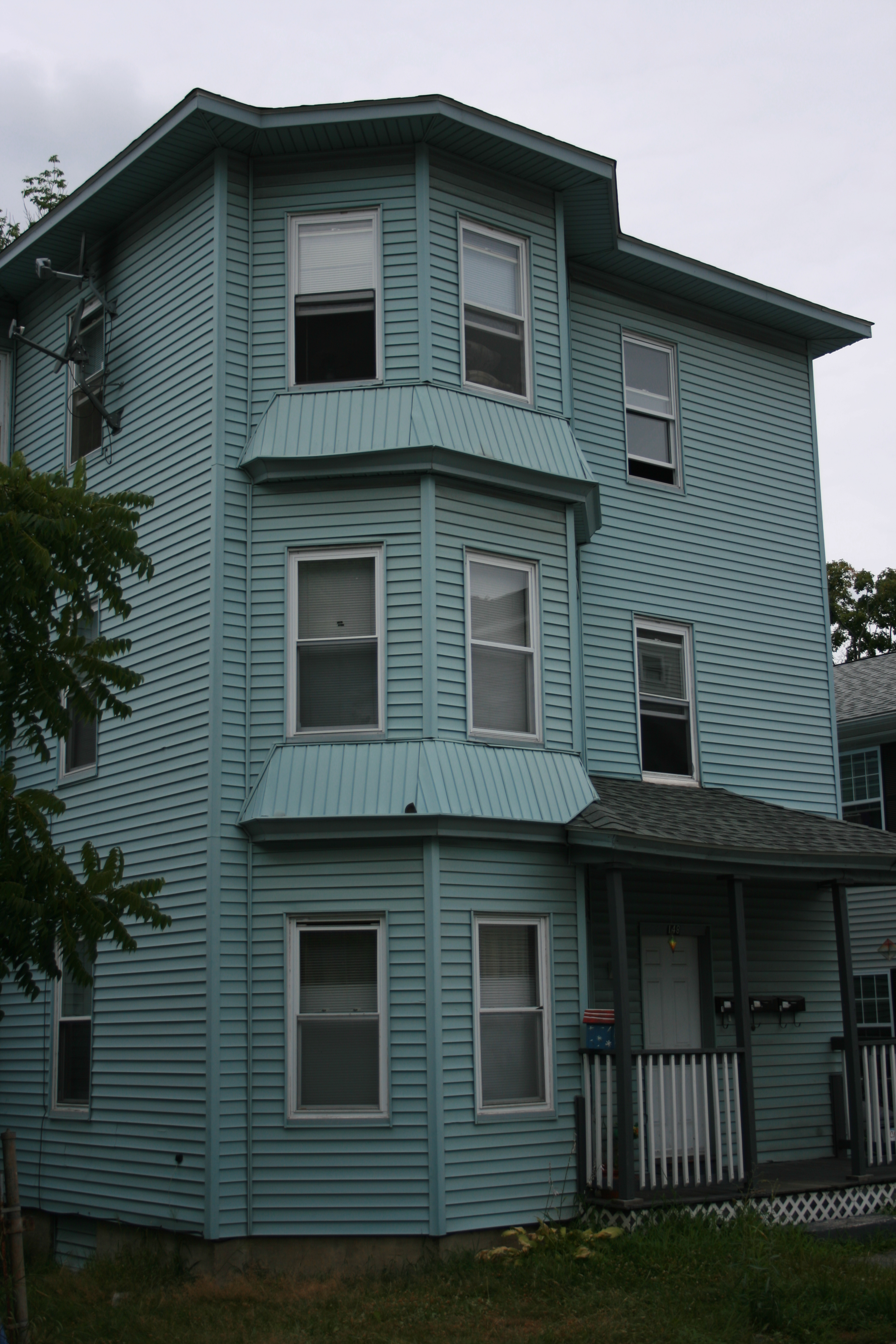
148 Eastern Ave

== See also ==
- National Register of Historic Places listings in eastern Worcester, Massachusetts
