= Lars Petterson-Silas Archer Three-Decker =

- U.S. National Register of Historic Places
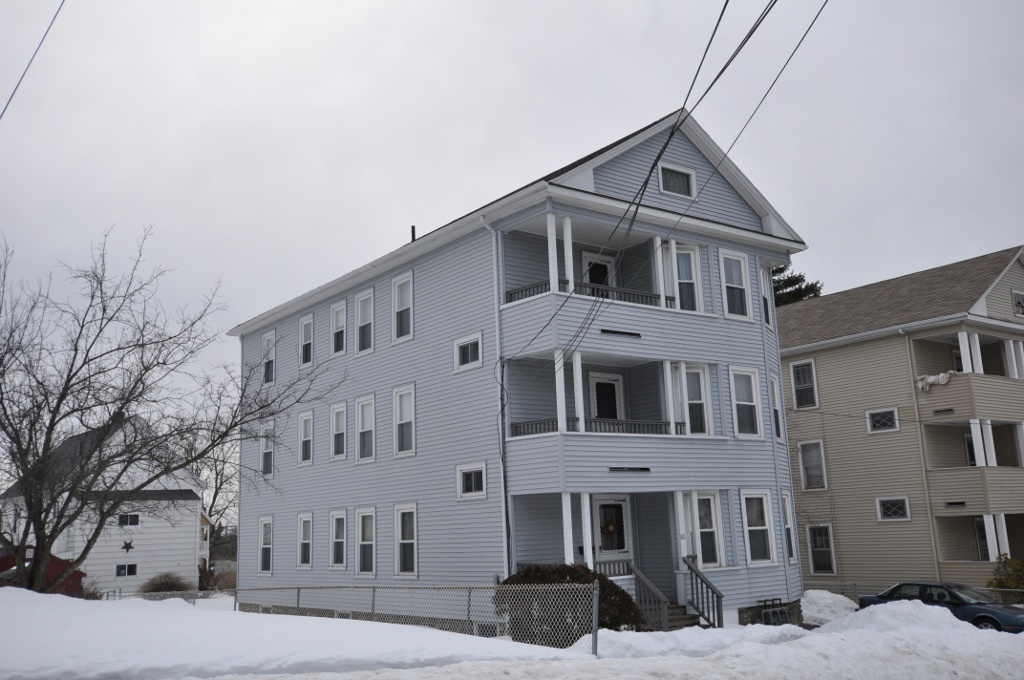

- Location within Massachusetts Location within the United States
- Location: 80 Fairhaven Rd., Worcester, Massachusetts
- Coordinates: 42°18′32″N 71°47′40″W
- Area: less than one acre
- Built: c. 1920
- Architect: Lars Petterson
- Architectural style: Colonial Revival
- MPS: Worcester Three-Deckers TR
- NRHP reference No.: 89002359
- Added to NRHP: February 9, 1990

The Lars Petterson-Silas Archer Three-Decker is a historic triple decker house in Worcester, Massachusetts. The house was built c. 1920, and was listed on the National Register of Historic Places as a good example of Colonial Revival architecture from that period. Some of those features have subsequently been lost (see photo).

== Description and history ==
The Lars Petterson-Silas Archer Three-Decker is located in a residential area of Worcester's northeastern Greendale neighborhood, on the south side of Fairhaven Road east of Leeds Street. It is a three-story wood-frame structure, with a gabled roof and exterior clad in modern siding. It retains some Colonial Revival styling, including a fully pedimented gable end, and a three-level porch supported by round columns. The main gable is fully pedimented, with a square diamond-light window at its center. Other details, such as a modillioned and dentillated cornice, and wooden shingle bands between the levels, have been lost or obscured due to the application of modern siding (see photo).

The house was built about 1920 by Lars Petterson, a local builder who developed a number of properties in the Greendale area. That area was at the time undergoing intensive development as a streetcar suburb, serving workers employed either downtown or in industrial facilities to its north. Petterson first used the property for rental units, leasing to workers at the Norton Company plant and other north Worcester industrial businesses.

== See also ==
- Lars Petterson-Adolph Carlson Three-Decker, 76 Fairhaven Road
- Lars Petterson-Fred Gurney Three-Decker, 2 Harlow Street
- Lars Petterson-James Reidy Three-Decker, 4 Harlow Street
- National Register of Historic Places listings in eastern Worcester, Massachusetts
