= Lars Petterson-Adolph Carlson Three-Decker =

- U.S. National Register of Historic Places
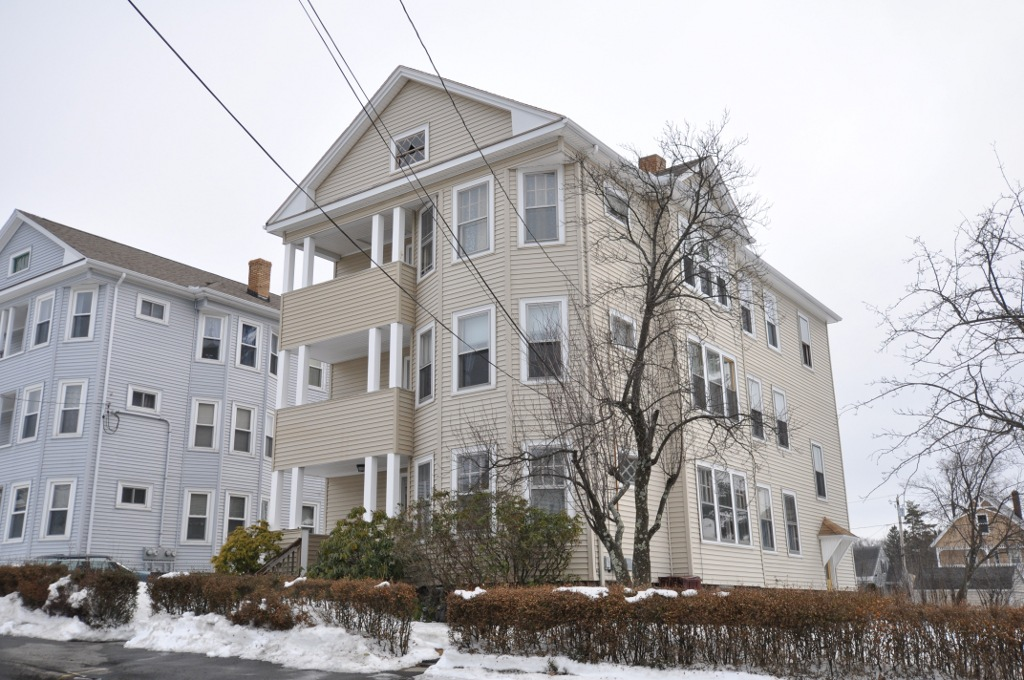

- Location within Massachusetts Location within the United States
- Location: 76 Fairhaven Rd., Worcester, Massachusetts
- Coordinates: 42°18′32″N 71°47′43″W
- Area: less than one acre
- Built: 1918
- Architect: Lars Petterson
- Architectural style: Colonial Revival
- MPS: Worcester Three-Deckers TR
- NRHP reference No.: 89002358
- Added to NRHP: February 9, 1990

The Lars Petterson-Adolph Carlson Three-Decker is a historic triple decker house in Worcester, Massachusetts. Built c. 1918 by Lars Petterson, a local builder, the house has well-preserved Colonial Revival styling. The house was listed on the National Register of Historic Places in 1990.

== Description and history ==
The Lars Petterson-Adolph Carlson Three-Decker is located in a residential setting in Worcester's northeastern Greendale neighborhood, on the south side of Fairhaven Road east of Leeds Street. It is a three-story wood-frame structure, with a gabled roof and exterior finished in modern siding. The front facade is asymmetrical, with a stack of porches on the left and a polygonal window bay on the right. Instead of a more typical polygonal side projection, this house has a rectangular projection on the side with a fully pedimented gable. The front porch originally had Tuscan columns (it now has square posts), and bands of wooden shingles between the floors. The gable at the top of the facade is fully pedimented, with a square diamond-light window at its center.

The house was built about 1918 by Lars Petterson, a local contractor who built a number of three-deckers in the Greendale area. The area was at that time being heavily developed as a streetcar suburb, its residents working either downtown or in industrial facilities just outside it. The house's early tenants were primarily Swedish immigrants.

== See also ==
- Lars Petterson-Silas Archer Three-Decker, 80 Fairhaven Road
- Lars Petterson-Fred Gurney Three-Decker, 2 Harlow Street
- Lars Petterson-James Reidy Three-Decker, 4 Harlow Street
- National Register of Historic Places listings in eastern Worcester, Massachusetts
