= Patrick McGrath Three-Decker =

- U.S. National Register of Historic Places
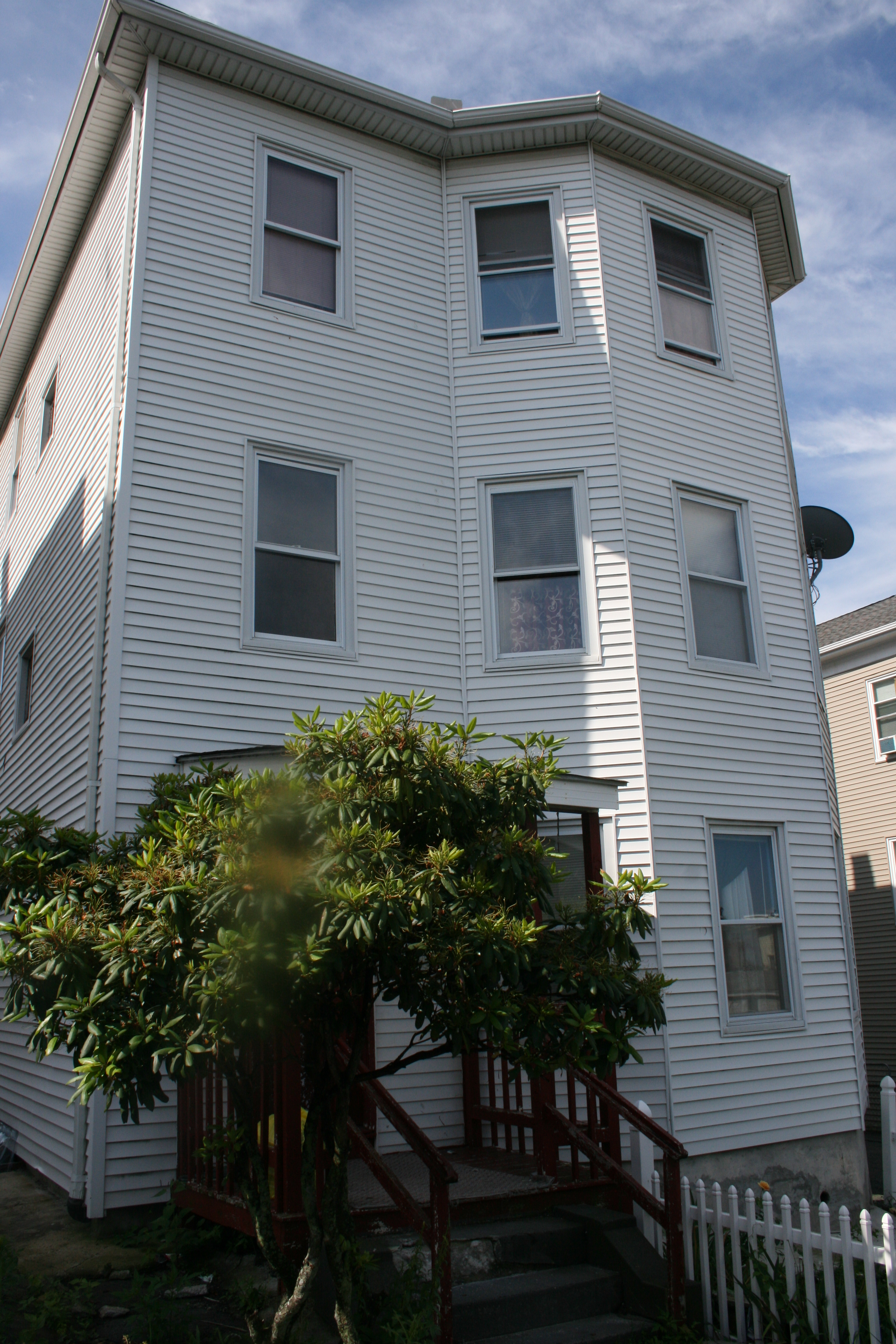

- Location within Massachusetts Location within the United States
- Location: 50 Dorchester St., Worcester, Massachusetts
- Coordinates: 42°15′5″N 71°47′40″W
- Area: less than one acre
- Built: c. 1894
- Architectural style: Queen Anne
- MPS: Worcester Three-Deckers TR
- NRHP reference No.: 89002407
- Added to NRHP: February 9, 1990

The Patrick McGrath Three-Decker is a historic triple decker house in Worcester, Massachusetts. It was built in 1894, during an early phase of development in the Grafton Hill area, and was highlighted for its Queen Anne styling when it was listed on the National Register of Historic Places in 1990. Exterior details, notably an ornately decorated porch, have since been lost (see photo).

== Description and history ==
The Patrick McGrath Three-Decker is located in southeastern Worcester, in the residential area known as Vernon Hill. The house is set on the south side of Dorchester Street east of Vernon Street. It is a three-story wood-frame structure, covered by a hip roof and modern siding. It has an asymmetrical front facade, with projecting polygonal window bay on the right, and a simple shed-roof porch sheltering the entrance on the left side. A rectangular window bay projects from the right side of the building. At the time of its National Register listing, the building had a number of distinctive Queen Anne features: it had jigsawn brackets in its eaves, and a band of scallop-cut wooden shingles between the second and third floors. A single-story porch extended across the entire front facade and around the side to the projecting bay, which had bracketed posts and a spindled valance. These features have been lost due to subsequent alterations.

The house was built about 1894, early in the period of triple-decker development in the Vernon Hill area. Patrick McGrath, the first owner, was a carpenter who also lived here. The neighborhood, which featured more widely spaced buildings, was being settled by mainly Irish immigrants moving out of more densely built areas closer to downtown. Early tenants included a teacher, a stonemason, and a clerk.

== See also ==
- National Register of Historic Places listings in eastern Worcester, Massachusetts
