= Lars Petterson-Fred Gurney Three-Decker =

- U.S. National Register of Historic Places
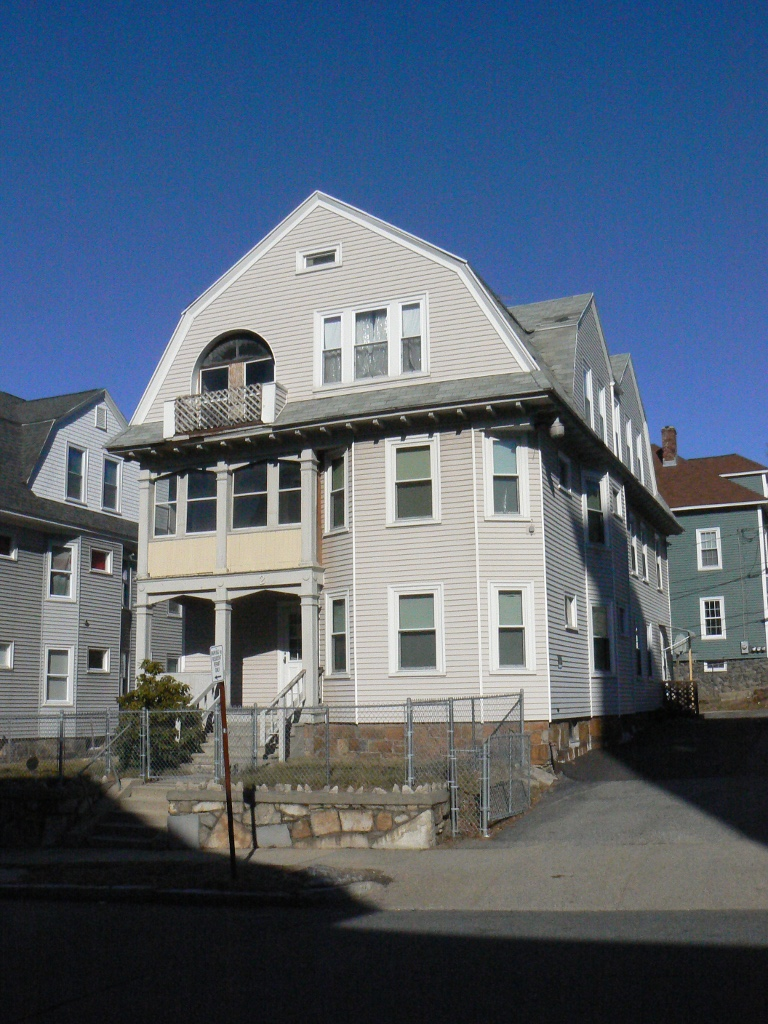

- Location within Massachusetts Location within the United States
- Location: 2 Harlow St., Worcester, Massachusetts
- Coordinates: 42°17′0″N 71°47′33″W
- Area: less than one acre
- Built: 1910
- Architect: Petterson, Lars
- Architectural style: Colonial Revival
- MPS: Worcester Three-Deckers TR
- NRHP reference No.: 89002368
- Added to NRHP: February 9, 1990

The Lars Petterson-Fred Gurney Three-Decker is a historic triple decker house in Worcester, Massachusetts. Built about 1910, it is a good local example of Colonial Revival architecture, built by prominent local builder Lars Petterson. The house was listed on the National Register of Historic Places in 1990.

== Description and history ==
The Lars Petterson-Fred Gurney Three-Decker is located northeast of downtown Worcester, in the Brittan Square neighborhood. It is set on the north side of Harlow Street, between Lincoln and Paine Streets. It is a three-story wood-frame structure, its third floor under a cross-gabled gambrel roof, and its exterior finished mainly in wooden clapboards. The front facade is asymmetrical, with porches on the left, and a polygonal window bay on the right. The porches of the first two floors are supported by square posts with arched peaks between them; the second-story porch has been enclosed in glass. The third-floor porch is set in a round-arch recess under the gambrel roof.

The house was built c. 1910 by Lars Petterson, a local builder who developed a number of other properties in Worcester. He retained ownership of this house into the 1920s, when he sold it to Fred Gurney, a superintendent at a wire factory. Early tenants appear to have been employed either at the Norton Company factory in northern Worcester, or in one of the nearby steel and wire factories.

== See also ==
- Lars Petterson-James Reidy Three-Decker, 4 Harlow Street
- Lars Petterson-Adolph Carlson Three-Decker, 76 Fairhaven Road
- Lars Petterson-Silas Archer Three-Decker, 80 Fairhaven Road
- National Register of Historic Places listings in eastern Worcester, Massachusetts
