= Lars Petterson-James Reidy Three-Decker =

- U.S. National Register of Historic Places
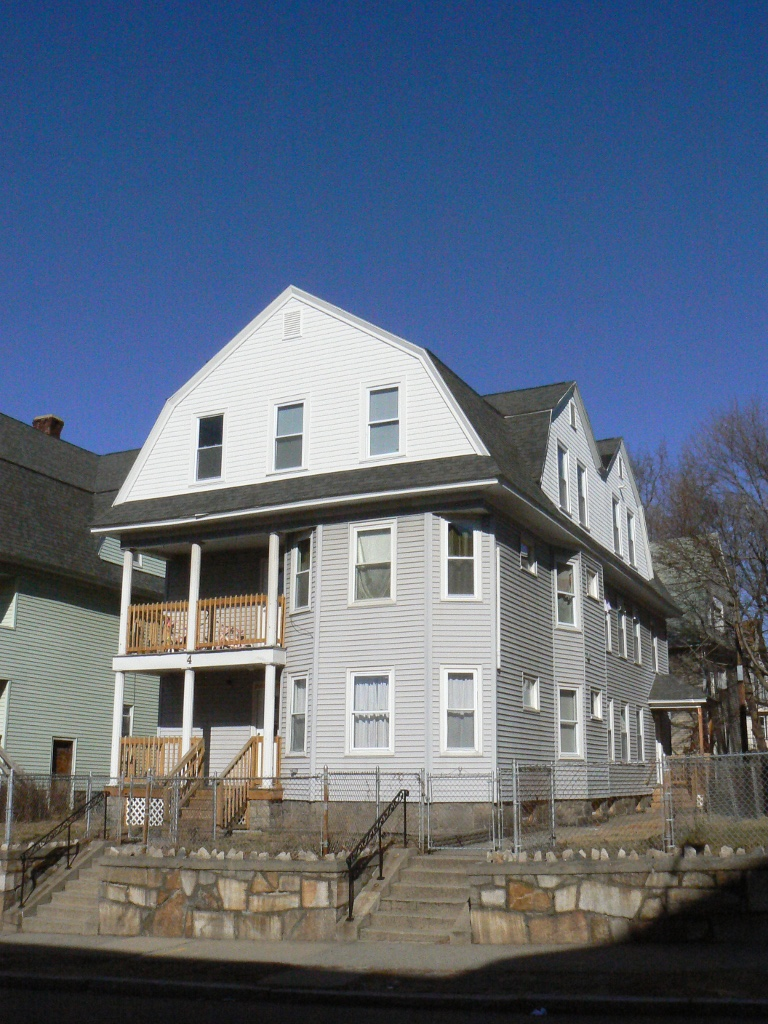

- Location within Massachusetts Location within the United States
- Location: 4 Harlow St., Worcester, Massachusetts
- Coordinates: 42°17′0″N 71°47′35″W
- Area: less than one acre
- Built: c. 1910
- Architectural style: Colonial Revival
- MPS: Worcester Three-Deckers TR
- NRHP reference No.: 89002376
- Added to NRHP: February 9, 1990

The Lars Petterson-James Reidy Three-Decker is a historic triple decker house in Worcester, Massachusetts. The house was built c. 1910 by Lars Petterson, a local builder who developed several other Worcester properties. When the house was listed on the National Register of Historic Places in 1990, its Colonial Revival detailing was cited, including square posts supporting the porches and a modillioned cornice. Some of these details have been lost or covered over by subsequent exterior alterations (see photo).

== Description and history ==
The Lars Petterson-James Reidy Three-Decker is located northeast of downtown Worcester, in the Brittan Square neighborhood. It is set on the north side of Harlow Street, between Lincoln and Paine Streets. It is a three-story wood-frame structure, its third floor under a cross-gabled gambrel roof, and its exterior finished in modern siding. The front facade is asymmetrical, with porches on the left, and a polygonal window bay on the right. The porches of the first two floors have plain square posts and simple modern. When surveyed for the National Register in the 1980s, the porch had square posts with simple capitals, and balustrades with turned balusters. Its main roof eave was modillioned, and it had a third-floor porch set recessed in an arch.

The house was built c. 1910 by Lars Petterson, a local builder who developed a number of other properties in Worcester. He retained ownership of this house into the 1920s, when he sold it to James Reidy, an electrician who also lived here. Early tenants appear to have been employed either at the Norton Company factory in northern Worcester, or in one of the nearby steel and wire factories.

== See also ==
- Lars Petterson-Fred Gurney Three-Decker, 2 Harlow Street
- Lars Petterson-Adolph Carlson Three-Decker, 76 Fairhaven Road
- Lars Petterson-Silas Archer Three-Decker, 80 Fairhaven Road
- National Register of Historic Places listings in eastern Worcester, Massachusetts
