= Barnard's Folly =

Historic houses in Fall River, Massachusetts, U.S.

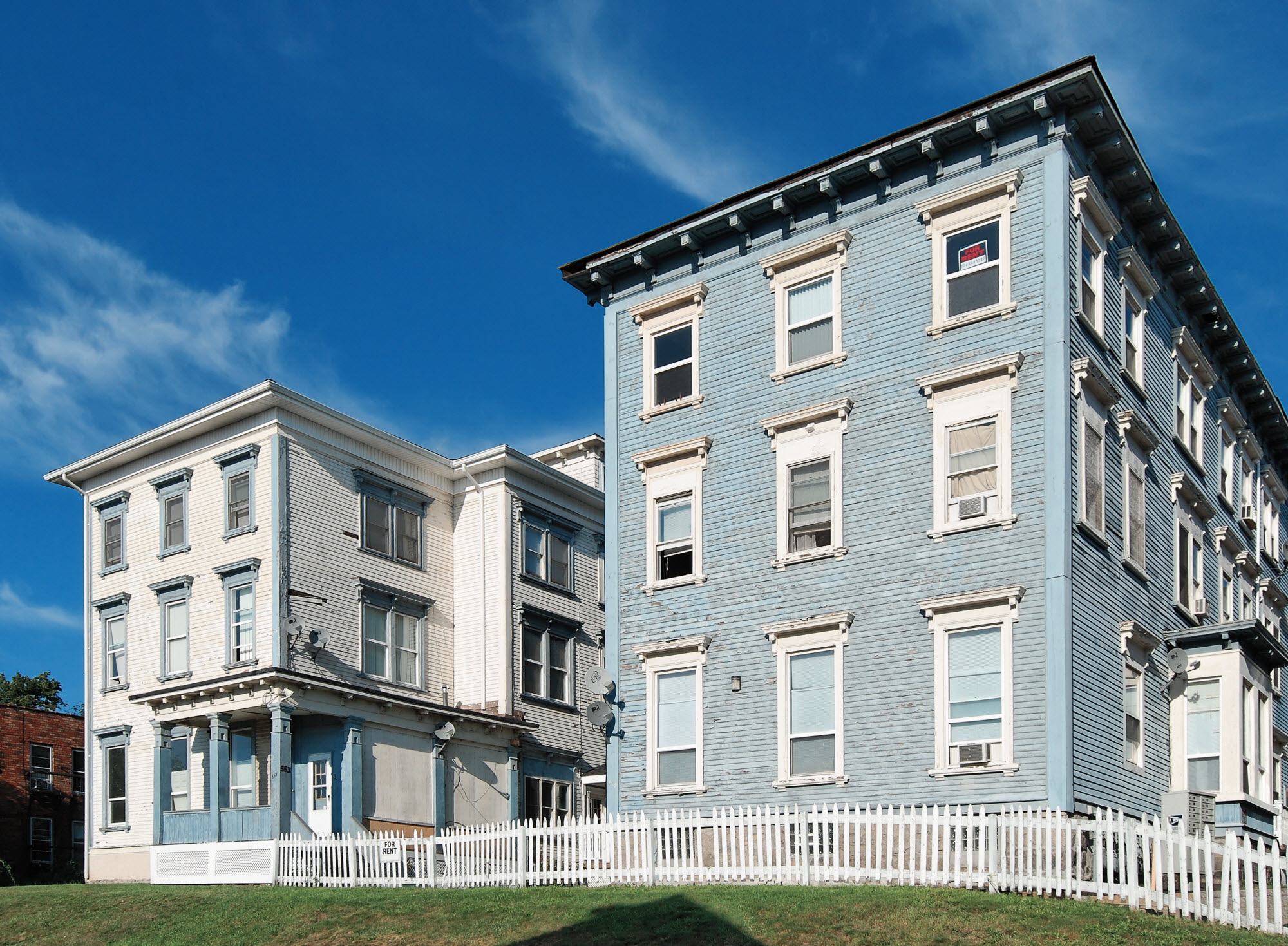
Bernard's Folly

Barnard's Folly is a group of historic triple decker tenement houses located on North Main Street in Fall River, Massachusetts, United States.

The site was eligible to be listed on the National Register of Historic Places in 1983, but was omitted due to the owner's objection.
