= Knut Erikson Three-Decker =

- U.S. National Register of Historic Places
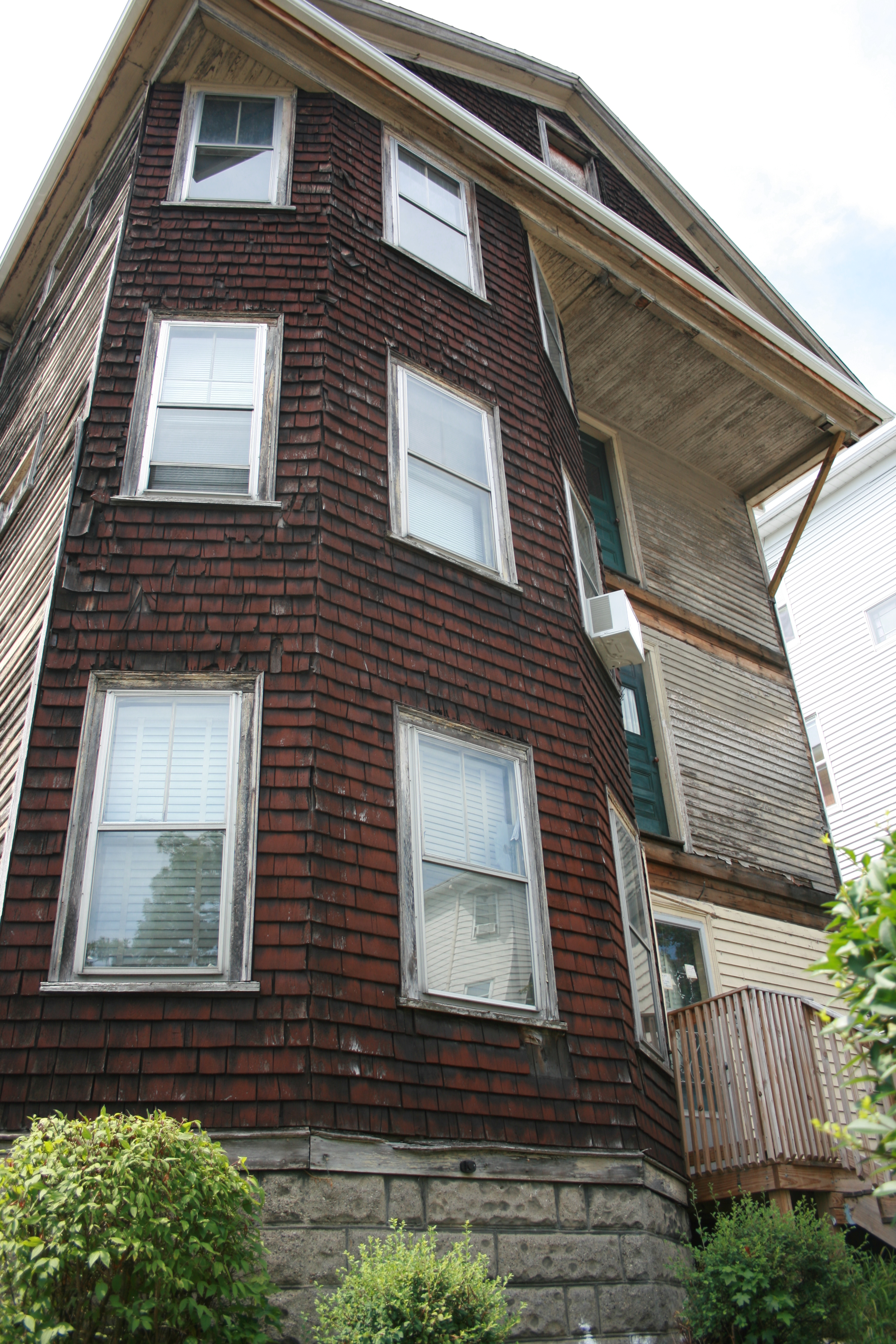

- Location within Massachusetts Location within the United States
- Location: 19 Stanton St., Worcester, Massachusetts
- Coordinates: 42°16′24″N 71°47′9″W
- Area: less than one acre
- Built: c. 1912
- Architectural style: Colonial Revival
- MPS: Worcester Three-Deckers TR
- NRHP reference No.: 89002438
- Added to NRHP: February 9, 1990

The Knut Erikson Three-Decker is a historic triple decker apartment building in Worcester, Massachusetts. Built c. 1912, the building exhibits some well-preserved Colonial Revival features, although some (like the porches) have been lost. The building was listed on the National Register of Historic Places in 1990.

== Description and history ==
The Knut Erikson Three-Decker is located in Worcester's eastern Bell Hill neighborhood, on the west side of Stanton Street between Belmont and Ivan Streets. It is a three-story wood frame structure, with a gabled roof and exterior finished in a combination of wooden clapboards and shingles. The front-facing gable end has deep eaves, and is fully pedimented with a window opening at the center. The facade is otherwise asymmetrical, with a three-story projecting polygonal window bay on the left, and the former site of a porch stack on the right. The left side also has a projecting polygonal bay, and a single-story porch with a shed roof supported by turned posts near the rear.

The house was built about 1912, during the final phases of triple-decker construction in the Belmont Street area. It originally had finely crafted porches on the right side, supported by paired round columns. Early occupants of the house were of Swedish or Finnish extraction, and were typically skilled laborers working for the city's manufacturers. The first documented owner, Knut Erikson, was a painter who lived here at least until 1930.

== See also ==
- National Register of Historic Places listings in eastern Worcester, Massachusetts
