= Paul Johnson Three-Decker =

- U.S. National Register of Historic Places
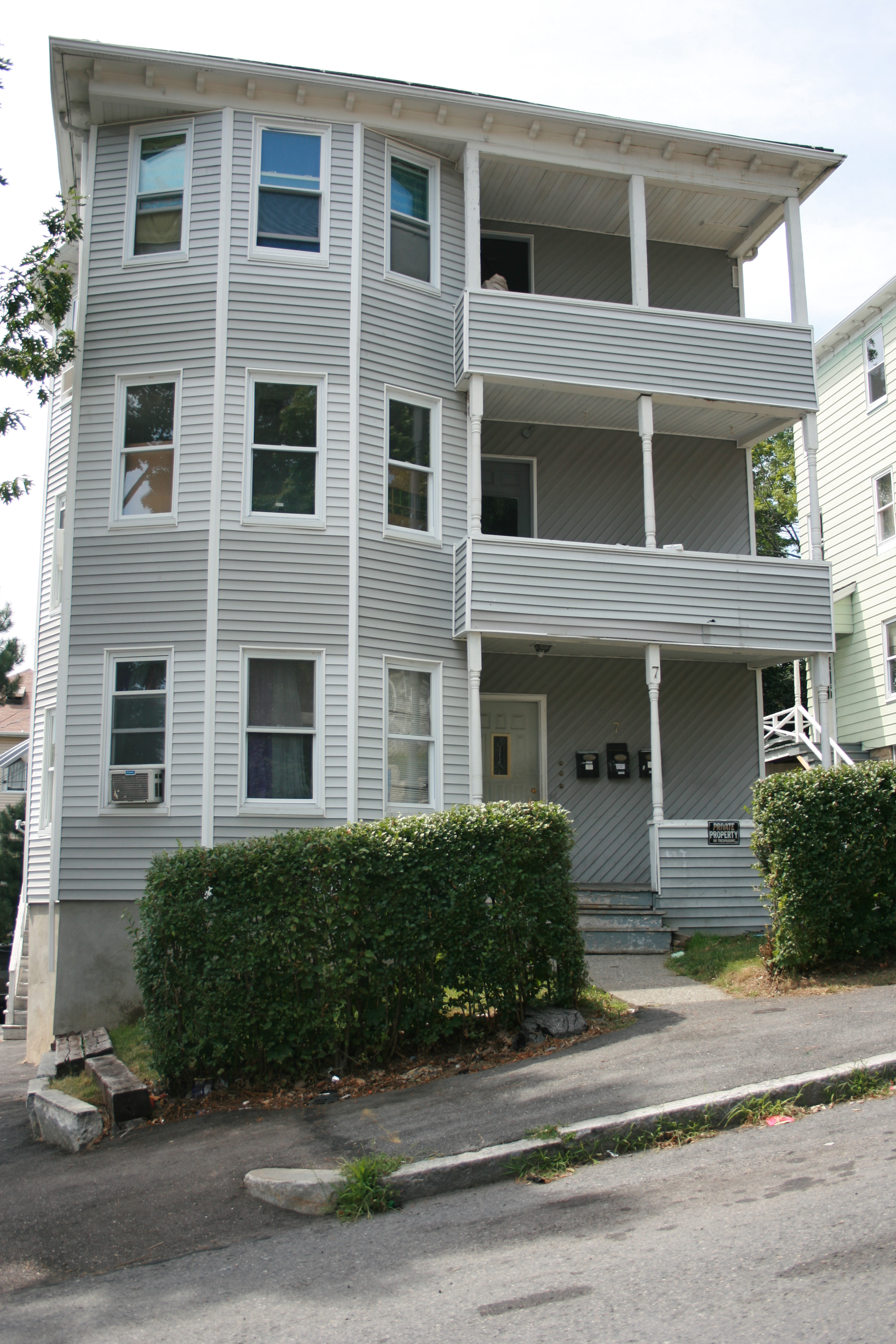

- Location within Massachusetts Location within the United States
- Location: 7 Stanton St., Worcester, Massachusetts
- Coordinates: 42°16′23″N 71°47′10″W
- Area: less than one acre
- Built: c. 1908
- Architectural style: Queen Anne
- MPS: Worcester Three-Deckers TR
- NRHP reference No.: 89002437
- Added to NRHP: February 9, 1990

The Paul Johnson Three-Decker is a historic triple decker house in Worcester, Massachusetts. Built about 1908, the house was listed on the National Register of Historic Places in 1990 as a locally significant example of a Queen Anne Victorian triple-decker. It has since been compromised by the removal of many of those features.

== Description and history ==
The Paul Johnson Three-Decker is located in eastern Worcester, on the west side of Stanton Street just north of its junction with Belmont Street (Massachusetts Route 9, a major east-west route through the city). The house is a three-story frame structure, covered by a hip roof. Its exterior is finished in synthetic siding. The main facade is divided into a polygonal window bay on the left, and a stack of porches on the right. When built, the porches featured turned posts and balustrades; the balustrades were replaced by siding in the 1920s, and the posts were probably replaced by conventional square posts in the 1990s or 2000s. The house's original siding included bands of decorative shingling between the floors, and wooden clapboards elsewhere.

The house was built about 1908, a period when the Belmont Street area was being built out with residences for workers at the city's large steel and wire factories. Most of the workers who settled in this area were Scandinavian (Swedish and Finnish) immigrants. Paul Johnson, the building's first owner, was a pattern maker; early tenants included machinists, an electrician, and a carpenter.

== See also ==
- National Register of Historic Places listings in eastern Worcester, Massachusetts
