= Evert Gullberg Three-Decker =

- U.S. National Register of Historic Places
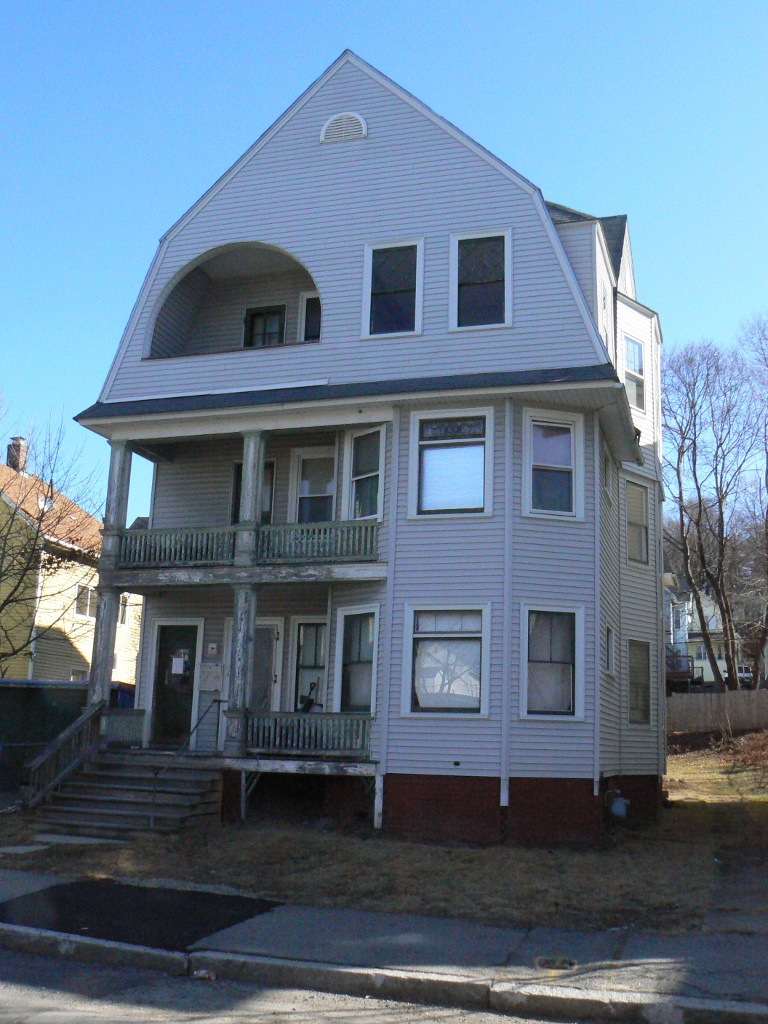

- Location within Massachusetts Location within the United States
- Location: 18 Ashton St., Worcester, Massachusetts
- Coordinates: 42°16′58″N 71°47′27″W
- Area: less than one acre
- Built: c. 1902
- Architectural style: Colonial Revival
- MPS: Worcester Three-Deckers TR
- NRHP reference No.: 89002388
- Added to NRHP: February 9, 1990

The Evert Gullberg Three-Decker is a historic triple decker in Worcester, Massachusetts. Built c. 1902, the house is a well-preserved instance of an early Colonial Revival triple decker with a gambrel roof. The building was listed on the National Register of Historic Places in 1990.

== Description and history ==
The Evert Gullberg Three-Decker stands in Worcester's northeastern Lincoln-Brittan Square neighborhood, on the east side of Ashton Street. It is a three-story wood frame structure, with a cross-gabled gambrel roof. Distinctive elements include the large gambrel gables, front windows with stained glass sections, and the third floor porch, which is recessed behind a shingled arch. Original shingling on the walls, typically found in the skirting below the front bay windows, has been covered by modern siding. The porches to the left of the window bay are likewise later 20th-century replacements.

The house was built about 1902, and represents an early example of the gambrel-roofed triple decker in the city, a style of Colonial Revival architecture that would not become widely deployed until the 1920s. The area was at the time of construction developing as a streetcar suburb, serving a largely middle-class population. Evert Gullberg, the first owner, was a carpenter; tenants included a salesman and a grocer. Most of the next few owners were absentee owners who used the building as a rental property.

== See also ==
- National Register of Historic Places listings in eastern Worcester, Massachusetts
