= Anthony Massad Three-Decker =

- U.S. National Register of Historic Places
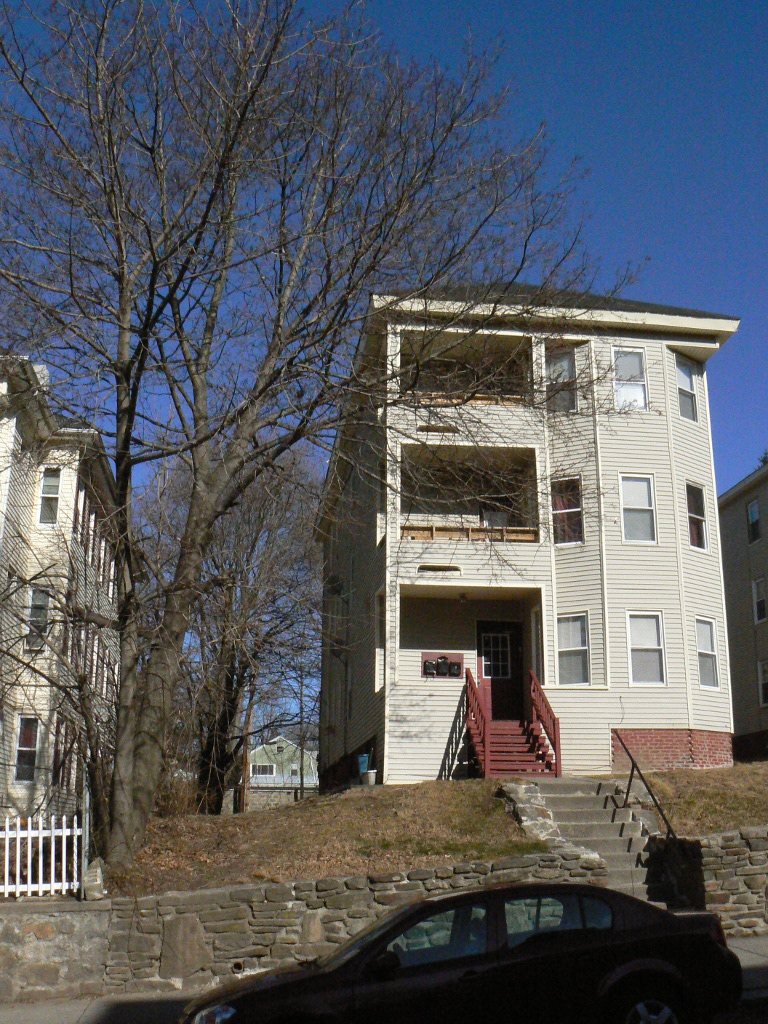

- Location within Massachusetts Location within the United States
- Location: 14 Harlow St., Worcester, Massachusetts
- Coordinates: 42°17′1″N 71°47′39″W
- Area: less than one acre
- Built: c. 1912
- Architectural style: Colonial Revival
- MPS: Worcester Three-Deckers TR
- NRHP reference No.: 89002380
- Added to NRHP: February 9, 1990

The Anthony Massad Three-Decker is a historic triple-decker house in Worcester, Massachusetts. Built about 1912, it was cited as a good local example of Colonial Revival styling when it was listed on the National Register of Historic Places in 1990. Many details, including Tuscan columns on the porch and modillion blocks in the eaves, have been lost or obscured by subsequent exterior changes (see photo).

== Description and history ==
The Anthony Massad Three-Decker is located in Worcester's northeastern Brittan Square area, on the north side of Harlow Street. It is a three-story wood frame structure, covered by a hip roof and finished in modern siding. Its front facade is asymmetrical, with a stack of three porches on the left side and a polygonal window bay on the right side. The porches are supported by square posts finished with siding. An angled window bay projects from one side of the building. The porch openings were originally arched, with Tuscan column supports.

The house was built about 1912, when the Brittan Square/Lincoln Street area was growing as a fashionable streetcar suburb. Early residents of the area were typically employed in either blue or white-collar skilled jobs downtown. Anthony Massad, this building's first owner, was the proprietor of the Exchange Hotel. Early tenants included a railroad brakeman and a police officer.

== See also ==
- National Register of Historic Places listings in eastern Worcester, Massachusetts
