= Euclid Avenue–Montrose Street Historic District =

Historic district in Massachusetts, United States

- U.S. National Register of Historic Places
- U.S. Historic district
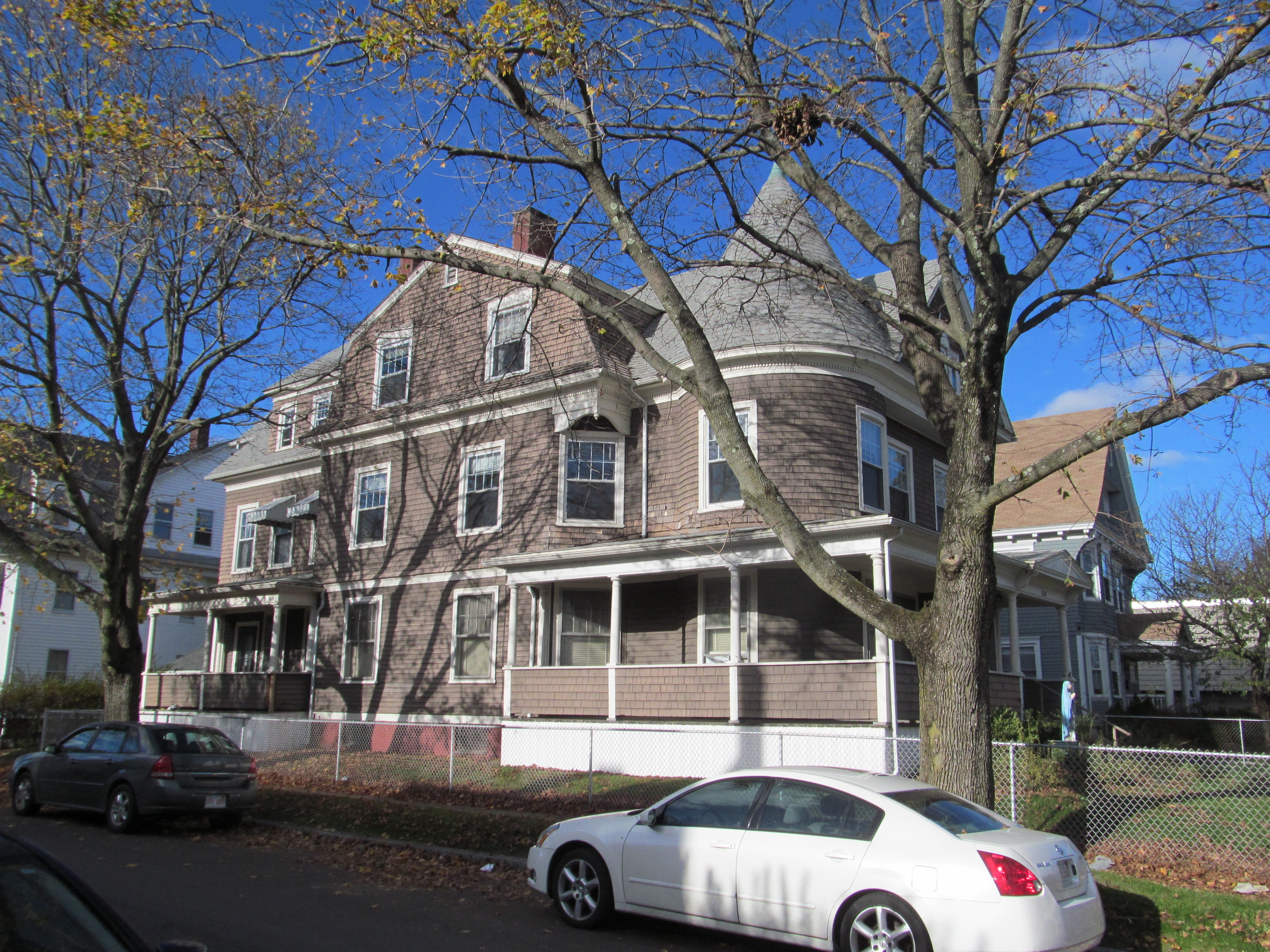
- Corner of Euclid and Vernon

- Location within Massachusetts Location within the United States
- Location: Along Euclid Ave. and Montrose St., between Vernon St. and Perry Ave., Worcester, Massachusetts
- Coordinates: 42°14′46″N 71°47′52″W
- Architectural style: Colonial Revival
- MPS: Worcester Three-Deckers TR
- NRHP reference No.: 89002357
- Added to NRHP: February 9, 1990

The Euclid Avenue–Montrose Street Historic District encompasses a well-preserved cluster of Colonial Revival triple decker housing units occupying a dramatic hillside location on Euclid Avenue and Montrose Street in Worcester, Massachusetts. It includes all triple deckers on those two streets between Vernon Street and Perry Avenue, and exclude other forms of housing in the area. Of the 40 triple deckers in the district, 27 have gambrel roofs, and most of these have an asymmetrical facade with porches on the first two levels, and a recessed porch area in the gambrel section of the facade. These porches are usually flanked on one side by a two-story projecting window bay. Detailing on the porches varies: some, such as 8 Euclid, have Tuscan columns, while others, such as 8 Montrose, have squat square columns; columns are also sometimes paired or clustered in groups. Houses with triangular gables more typically have three-story porches, often with arched openings instead of a simpler construction. The layout of the properties on the hill, combined with the somewhat cohesive styling of the buildings, makes the district visually distinctive from its surroundings when viewed from a number of perspectives. The district includes Deedy Park, a triangular grassy area where Euclid and Montrose meet.

Most of the district was built out between 1910 and 1930. The area was attractive to laborers as well as white collar workers, given easy access by streetcar on Vernon Street to the city's work centers. Early residents were predominantly Irish, with Scandinavians arriving in larger numbers later.

The district was listed on the National Register of Historic Places in 1990.

== See also ==
- National Register of Historic Places listings in eastern Worcester, Massachusetts
