= Thomas Lumb Three-Decker (Dewey Street) =

- U.S. National Register of Historic Places
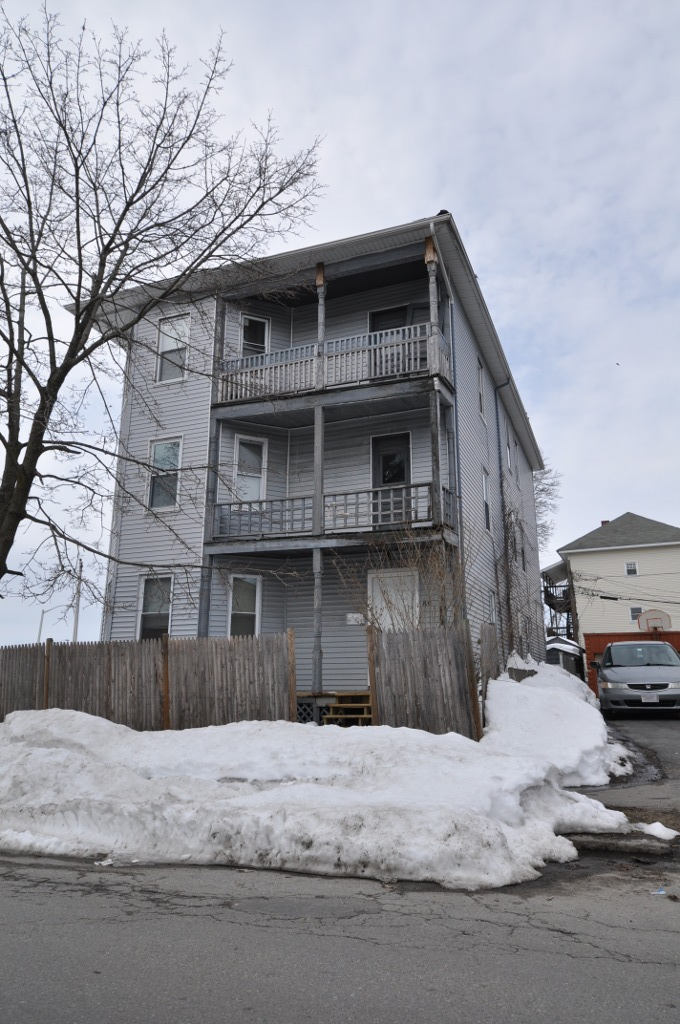

- Location within Massachusetts Location within the United States
- Location: 80 Dewey St., Worcester, Massachusetts
- Coordinates: 42°15′30″N 71°52′54″W
- Built: 1894
- Architectural style: Queen Anne
- MPS: Worcester Three-Deckers TR
- NRHP reference No.: 89002403
- Added to NRHP: February 9, 1990

The Thomas Lumb Three-Decker is a historic triple decker house in Worcester, Massachusetts. It is a well-preserved example of the style in Worcester's Piedmont section with Queen Anne styling. The building follows the typical side hall plan, and features porches on the front with turned posts and spindle friezes. Other details, including decorative brackets in the extended roof overhang and elements of the window surrounds, have been lost since the property was listed on the National Register of Historic Places in 1990.

== See also ==
- Thomas Lumb Three-Decker (Winfield Street)
- National Register of Historic Places listings in southwestern Worcester, Massachusetts
- National Register of Historic Places listings in Worcester County, Massachusetts
