= Duplex (building) =

Type of residential building

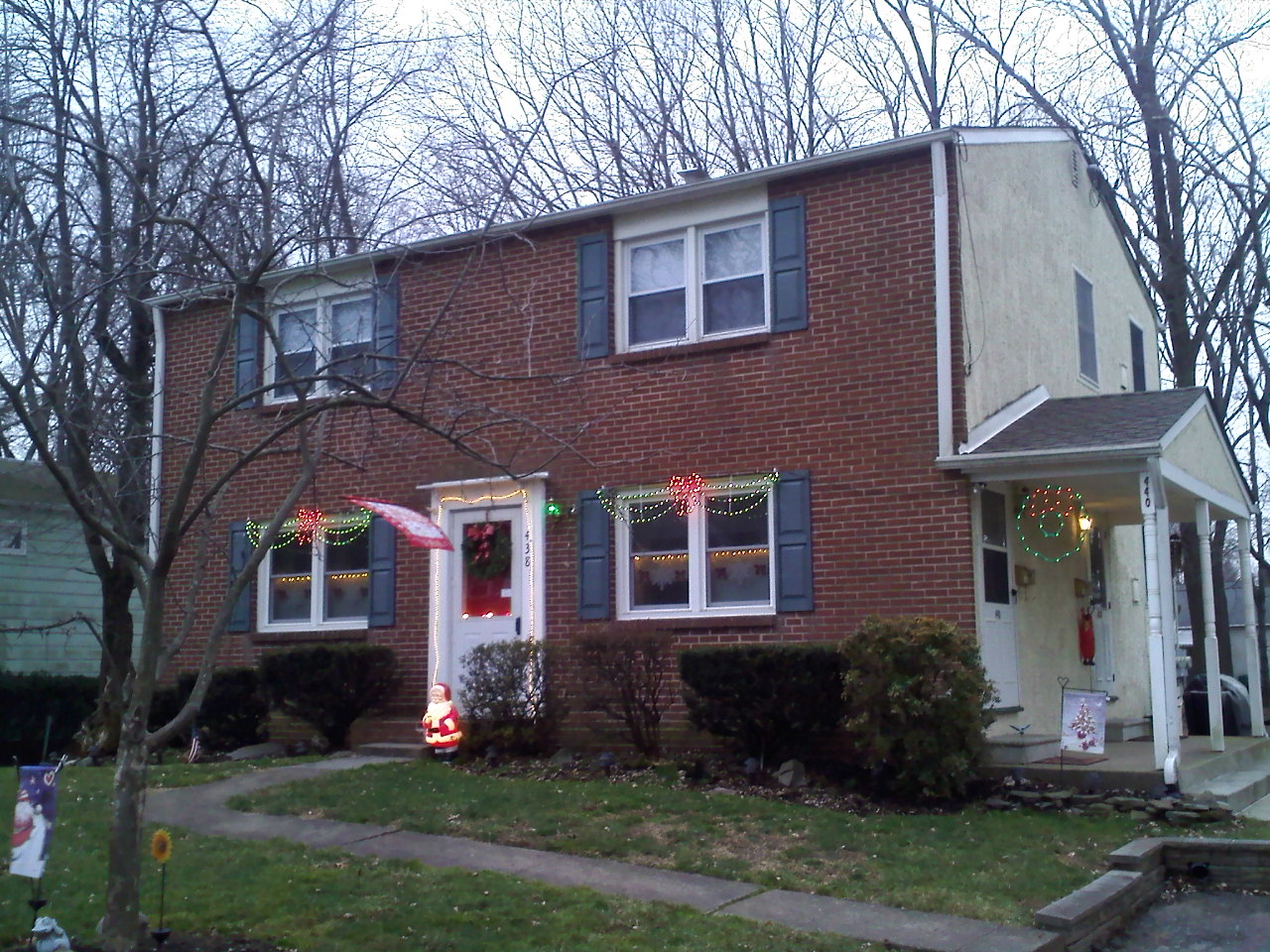
An over-and-under two-story apartment duplex in Southeastern Pennsylvania

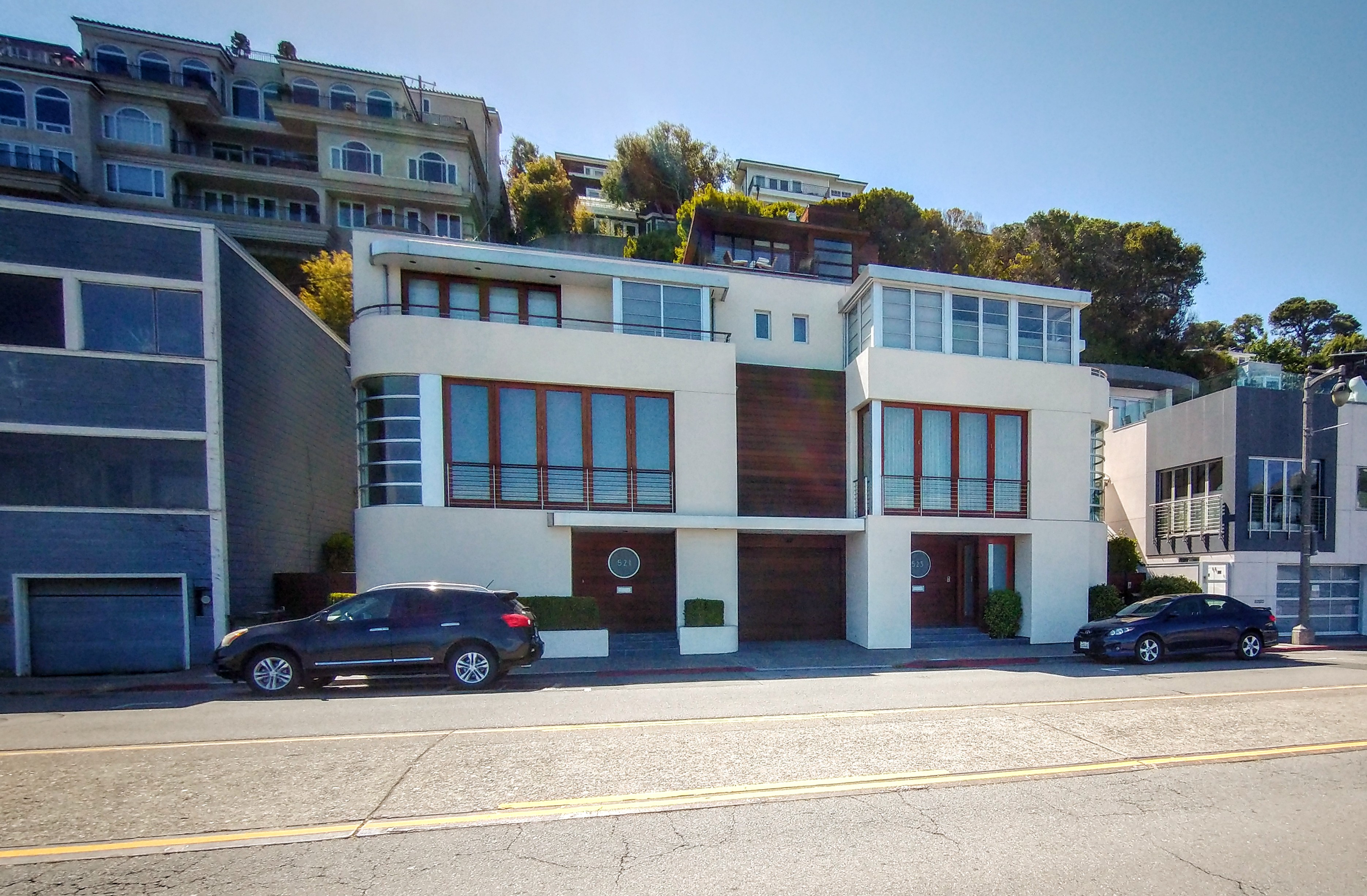
A large, modern side-by-side duplex in downtown Sausalito, California

A duplex house plan has two living units attached to each other, either next to each other as townhouses and condominiums or one above the other like apartments. By contrast, a building comprising two attached units on two distinct properties is typically considered semi-detached or twin homes but is also called a duplex in parts of the Northeastern United States, Western Canada, and Saudi Arabia.

The term "duplex" is not extended to three-unit and four-unit buildings, as they would be referred to with specific terms such as three-family (or triplex) and fourplex (or quadplex/quadruplex) or a more general multiplex. Because of the flexibility of the term, the line between an apartment building and a duplex is somewhat blurred, with apartment buildings tending to be bigger, while duplexes are usually the size of a single-family house.

Certain jurisdictions may describe these as paired homes.

== Variants ==
=== United States ===
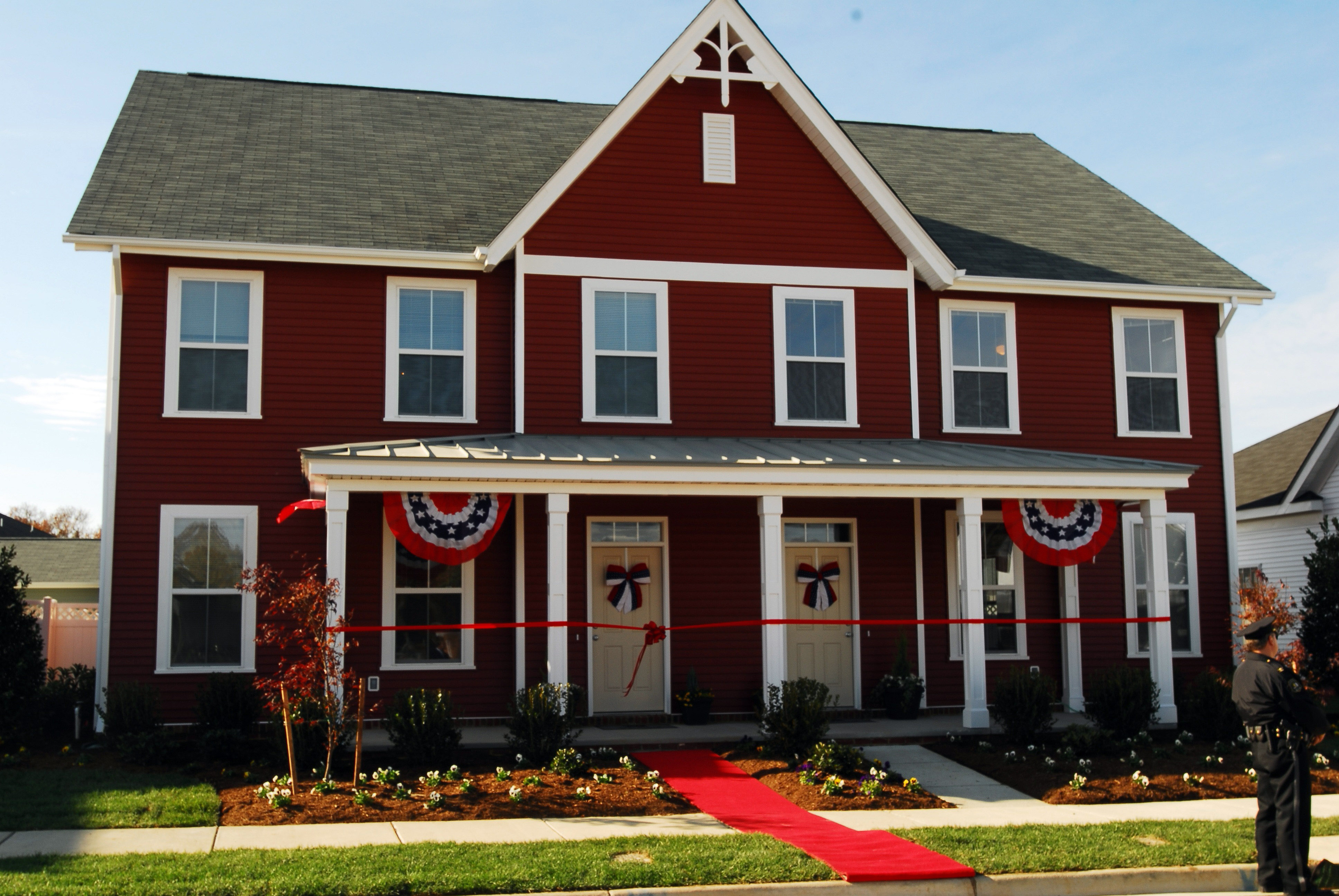
A side by side duplex also known as a semi-detached house

In dense areas like Manhattan and downtown Chicago, a duplex or duplex apartment refers to a maisonette, a single dwelling unit spread over two floors connected by an indoor staircase. Similarly, a triplex apartment refers to an apartment spread out over three floors. These properties can be quite expensive and include the most expensive property in Manhattan as of 2006 (according to Forbes magazine), a triplex atop The Pierre hotel. In this context, an apartment located on only one floor may be called a simplex.

=== United Kingdom ===
In the United Kingdom, the term duplex is sometimes used by property professionals such as architects and estate agents and refers only to a flat or apartment on two floors connected by an inner staircase though many newer apartments have open-plan designs including mezzanines. The far more commonly used term is 'maisonette' meaning two dwellings split horizontally, like flats, but each with their own separate external door, unlike flats which have a shared external door.

=== Australia ===
In Australia, a duplex is often considered a residential building containing two homes that share a common central wall. As such they are usually a mirror image of each other in layout. Also referred to as a maisonette in South Australia.

=== Back-to-back ===
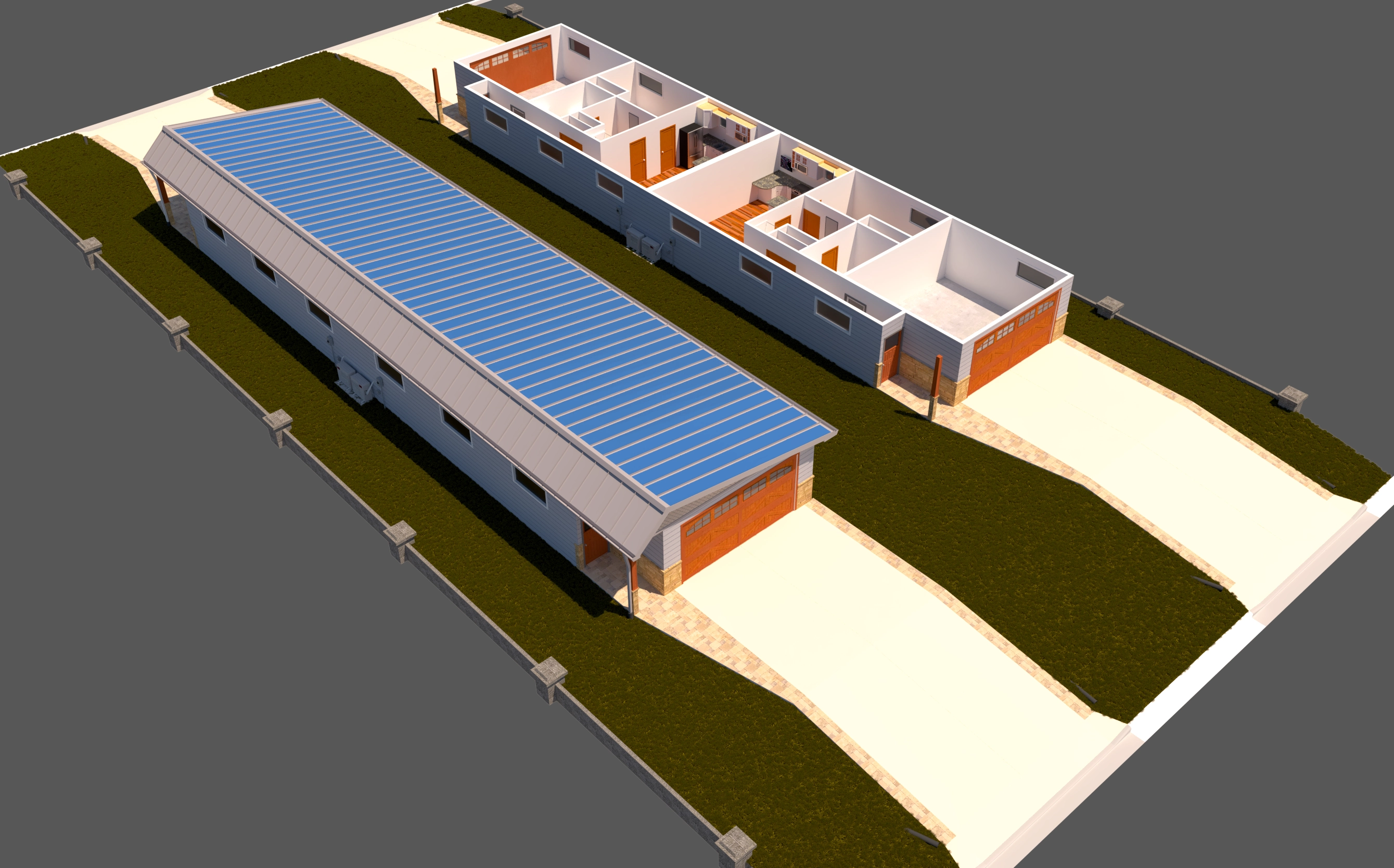
Back-to-back duplexes

Back-to-back duplexes are variants where the homes have a shared back wall and have opposite front entries.

== Urban planning ==
In urban planning, the term duplex is used more specifically. Major Canadian cities sometimes use the term duplex to refer specifically to a building with one unit built above another. Edmonton defines 'duplex housing' as "a building where 1 principal dwelling is placed over another principal welling, in whole or in part, within a single building" where "each principal dwelling has separate and individual access". Calgary defines duplex dwelling as "a building which contains two dwelling Units, one located above the other, with each having a separate entrance". Toronto proposes in their new zoning bylaw to define 'duplex building' as a building that has only two dwelling units, and one dwelling unit is entirely or partially on top of the other dwelling unit. Halifax defines duplex dwelling as "the whole of a dwelling that is divided horizontally into two separate dwelling units, each of which has an independent entrance".

Other major cities use the term duplex, but for dwelling units. Dallas defines the term duplex as "two dwelling units located on a lot". Philadelphia defines a duplex dwelling as "a dwelling occupied as the home or residence of two (2) families, under one (1) roof, each family occupying a single unit", a definition that excludes a pair of twin (semi-detached) houses, two dwellings separated by a firewall that extends above the roofline.

Other major cities do not use the term duplex in their zoning or land-use bylaws. San Francisco and Vancouver use the term two-family dwelling. Winnipeg uses the term dwelling, two-family. The definitions of these terms do not specify the physical relationship between the two dwelling units in the building. In cities such as Buffalo, Detroit and Chicago, the term "two-flat" is used and defines as a "residential building that contains 2 dwelling units located on a single lot. The dwelling units must share a common wall or common floor/ceiling."

Where cities do not define the relationship of the dwelling units to one another, units may be built one on top of the other, or one beside the other. The latter arrangement is more specifically referred to as a semi-detached building.

Many cities in the United States, Canada, and Australia have seen an increased push to allow duplexes in more zoning districts or even in all residential zoning districts. Renewed interest in supporting duplexes in many areas is part of a larger push to support missing middle housing types and related affordability, sustainability, and urban design goals.

== See also ==
- Apartment
- Condominium
- List of house types
- Medium-density housing
- Polish flat
- Semi-detached
- Split-level home
- Triple-decker triplex
- Tyneside flat
