= Thomas Lumb Three-Decker (Winfield Street) =

- U.S. National Register of Historic Places
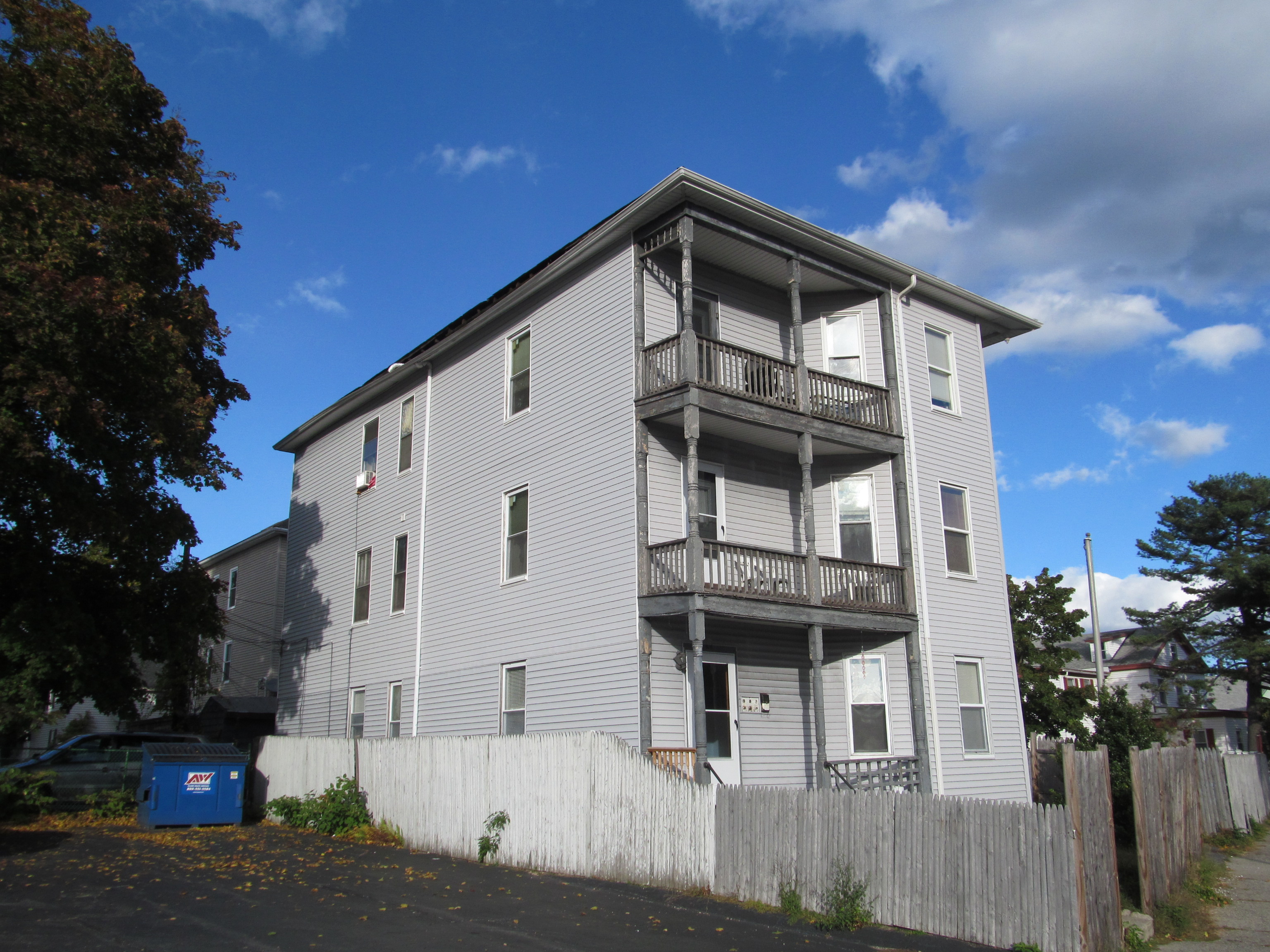

- Location within Massachusetts Location within the United States
- Location: 44 Winfield St., Worcester, Massachusetts
- Coordinates: 42°15′36″N 71°49′17″W
- Built: 1894
- Architectural style: Queen Anne
- MPS: Worcester Three-Deckers TR
- NRHP reference No.: 89002448
- Added to NRHP: February 9, 1990

The Thomas Lumb Three-Decker is a historic triple decker house in Worcester, Massachusetts. The home was built in 1894. It is an example of the style popular during Worcester's westward expansion, with well preserved Queen Anne styling. Although many details have been lost due to residing since its listing in 1990 on the National Register of Historic Places, it retains decorative turned porch supports and balusters. Thomas Lumb, its first owner, was a local saloon keeper, and its early tenants were ethnically diverse.

== See also ==
- Thomas Lumb Three-Decker (Dewey Street)
- National Register of Historic Places listings in southwestern Worcester, Massachusetts
- National Register of Historic Places listings in Worcester County, Massachusetts
