= Polish flat =

Type of house in the United States

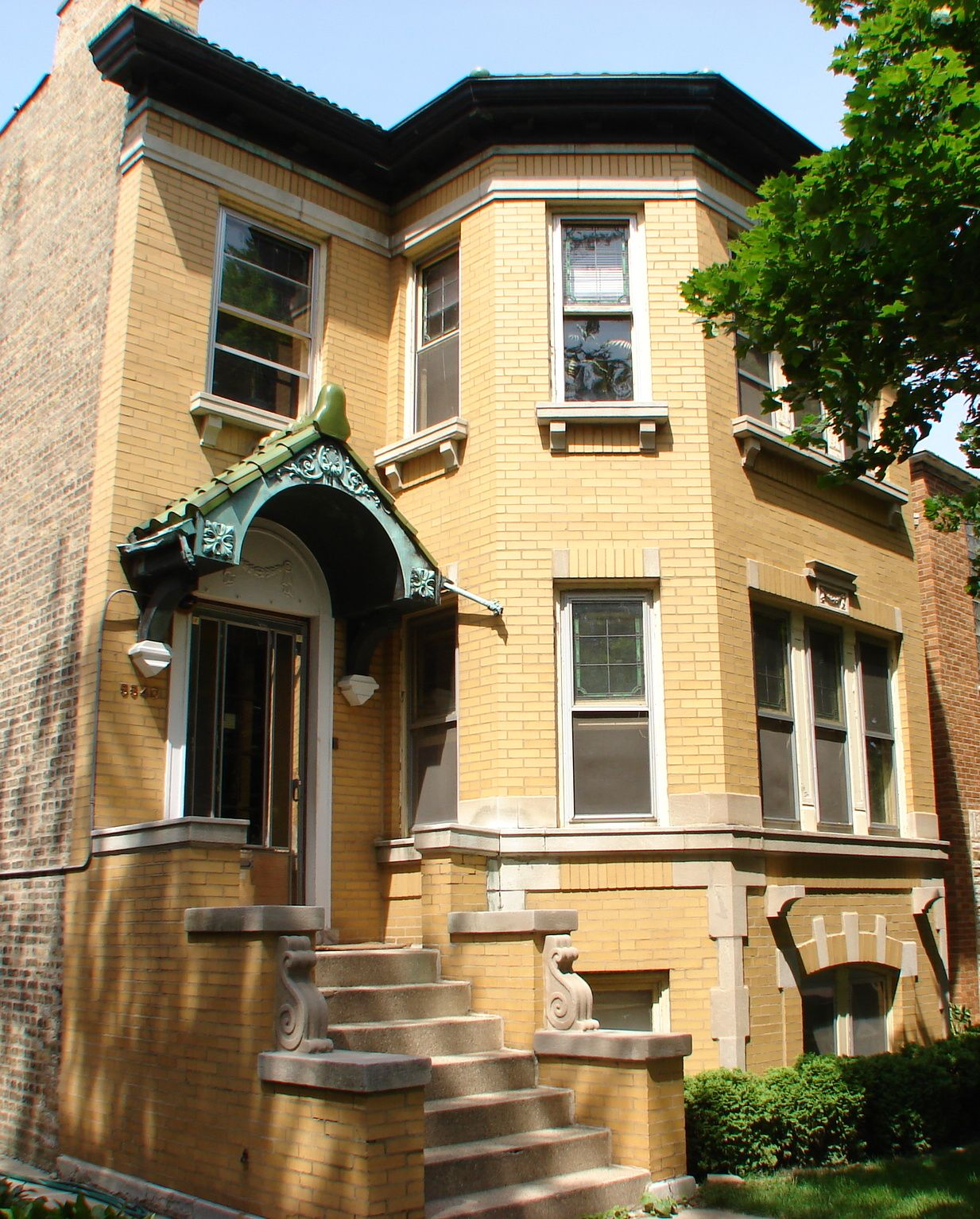
A two-flat in Chicago's Portage Park neighborhood

A Polish flat (sometimes referred to as a German duplex) is a two-family home with separate entrances, with the units stacked on top of one another instead of side by side. Most homes of this type were constructed in the early 20th century. Buildings were called this especially in America.

Constructing the units in two stages balanced affordability and quality. The new Polish immigrants, as soon as they could afford to do so, would purchase a small one-story or story-and-a-half cottage, or sometimes build one on a vacant lot with minimum cost, with a modest Victorian Gothic or Queen Anne façade. When they saved again, they would then raise the frame up on jacks creating a partially sunken basement, excavate the area underneath, pour a concrete floor, build foundation walls with masonry, then set the old frame back down over the new apartment.

This arrangement enabled a family of limited means to end up with both a home and a modestly priced rental apartment unit. Most of the remaining Polish flats are found in Milwaukee, Wisconsin. Since Polish American immigrants prized land ownership in their own culture, this solution which was prominent in the areas they settled in came to be associated with them. Similar housing was common in many Detroit neighborhoods built before World War II.

Polish flats were "specifically designed both to accommodate and to accelerate the economic improvement of the family... Polish flats were human values reflected in architecture and testified to the hard work, practicality, and optimism of their inhabitants," wrote former Milwaukee mayor John Norquist in his book, The Wealth of Cities.

== See also ==
- Duplex
- Cottage flat
