= Three-decker (house) =

Type of house

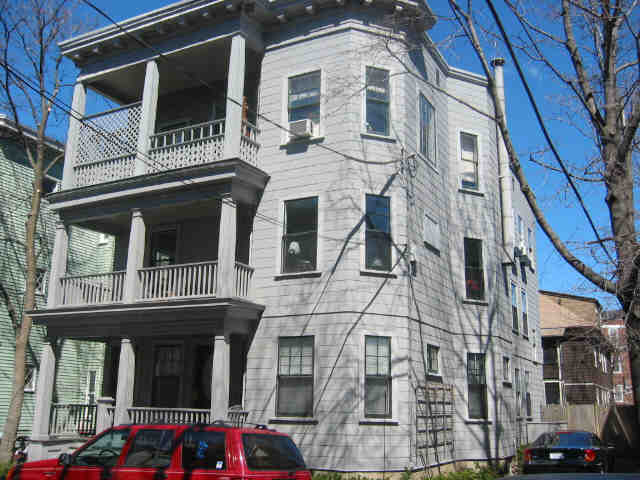
Three-decker apartment building in Cambridge, Massachusetts, built in 1916

A three-decker, also known as a triple-decker, is the U.S. term for a type of vertical triplex apartment building. These detached three-story buildings are typically of light-framed, wood construction, in which each floor usually consists of a single apartment. Both stand-alone and semi-detached versions are common.

During the late 19th and early 20th centuries, tens of thousands of three-deckers were constructed, mostly in New England, as a cheap means of housing the thousands of newly arrived immigrant workers who filled the region's factories. A typical three-decker contained three apartments, usually with identical floor plans. The three-decker apartment house was seen as an alternative to narrow single-unit row-housing built in other cities of the Northeastern United States during this period, such as New York City, Boston, Philadelphia, Baltimore, and Washington, D.C.

Originally, extended families often lived in two of a building's floors or in all three. Some three-deckers were divided into six units.

Three-deckers often account for a disproportionate number of structure fires.

== History ==
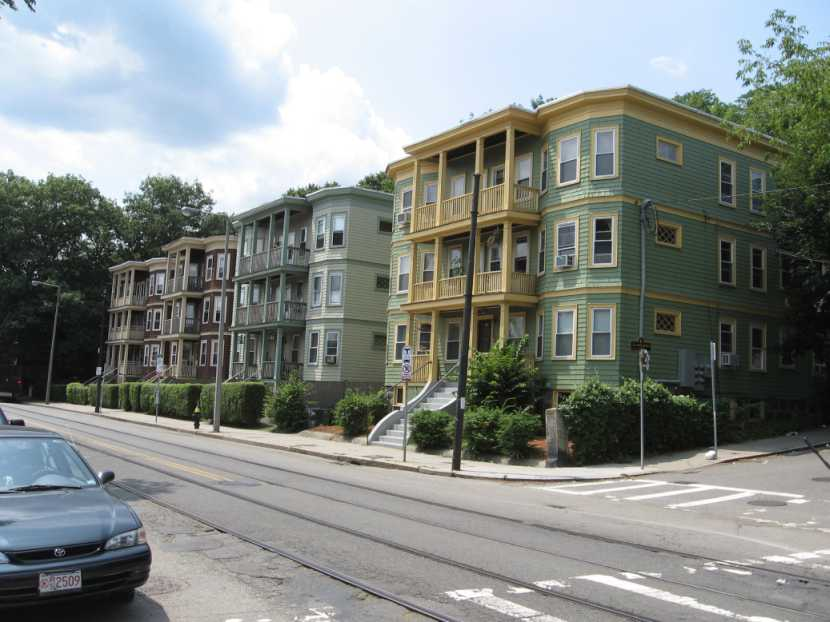
Double three-deckers in Boston's Jamaica Plain neighborhood

Three-deckers were most commonly built in the emerging industrial cities of central New England between 1870 and 1920. There are large concentrations in Massachusetts and Rhode Island. Worcester, Massachusetts, was the likely origin of the type, attributed to Francis Gallagher (1830–1911), though other cities make the same claim. Three-deckers can be found in the former industrial centers of New Hampshire, Maine, and Connecticut, as well as the New York City area (particularly in northern New Jersey and Yonkers) and Upstate New York, where they are commonly seen as far west as Utica. Three-deckers are also found in Canadian cities with strong ties to New England, particularly Halifax, though they are less ubiquitous.

Three-deckers were primarily housing for working-class and middle-class families, often in multiple rows on narrow lots in the areas surrounding the factories. They were derided as poor-quality buildings, shoddily constructed from flammable balloon framing: a 1911 report by the Massachusetts State Housing Committee in Massachusetts decried the three-decker as "a flimsy fire-trap and a menace to human life". Anti-immigrant sentiment led to the Tenement Act in Massachusetts in 1912, which allowed municipalities to ban three-deckers; many did.

It is estimated that by 1920 the city of Boston had over 15,000 three-decker houses. Areas such as Dorchester, Roxbury, Mattapan, and Jamaica Plain were popular with the emerging middle class and became "streetcar suburbs" as transportation systems expanded from the older, core sections of the city. Typically, the affordable three-decker homes attracted live-in landlords who would collect rent from the other two apartments.

In Worcester, Massachusetts, sewer connection charges were based on street frontage, so builders favored houses with as little frontage as possible. This is one reason why three-deckers are often situated on narrow lots with their smaller sides at the front and rear.

In the textile mill city of Fall River, Massachusetts, thousands of wood-framed multi-family tenements were built by the mill owners during the boom years of the 1870s to house their workers. Many more were built by private individuals who rented their apartments to the mill workers and their families. This style of housing differed greatly from the well-spaced boardinghouses of the early 19th century built in Lowell and Lawrence, Massachusetts, or the cottages of Rhode Island.

A different three-story style apartment house is also common in urban working-class neighborhoods in northern New Jersey (particularly in and around Newark, Jersey City and Paterson). They are sometimes locally referred to as "Bayonne Boxes".

Similar brick apartment buildings were built in Chicago in the 1910s and 1920s; there, they are locally referred to as "Three Flats".

== Structure and variations ==
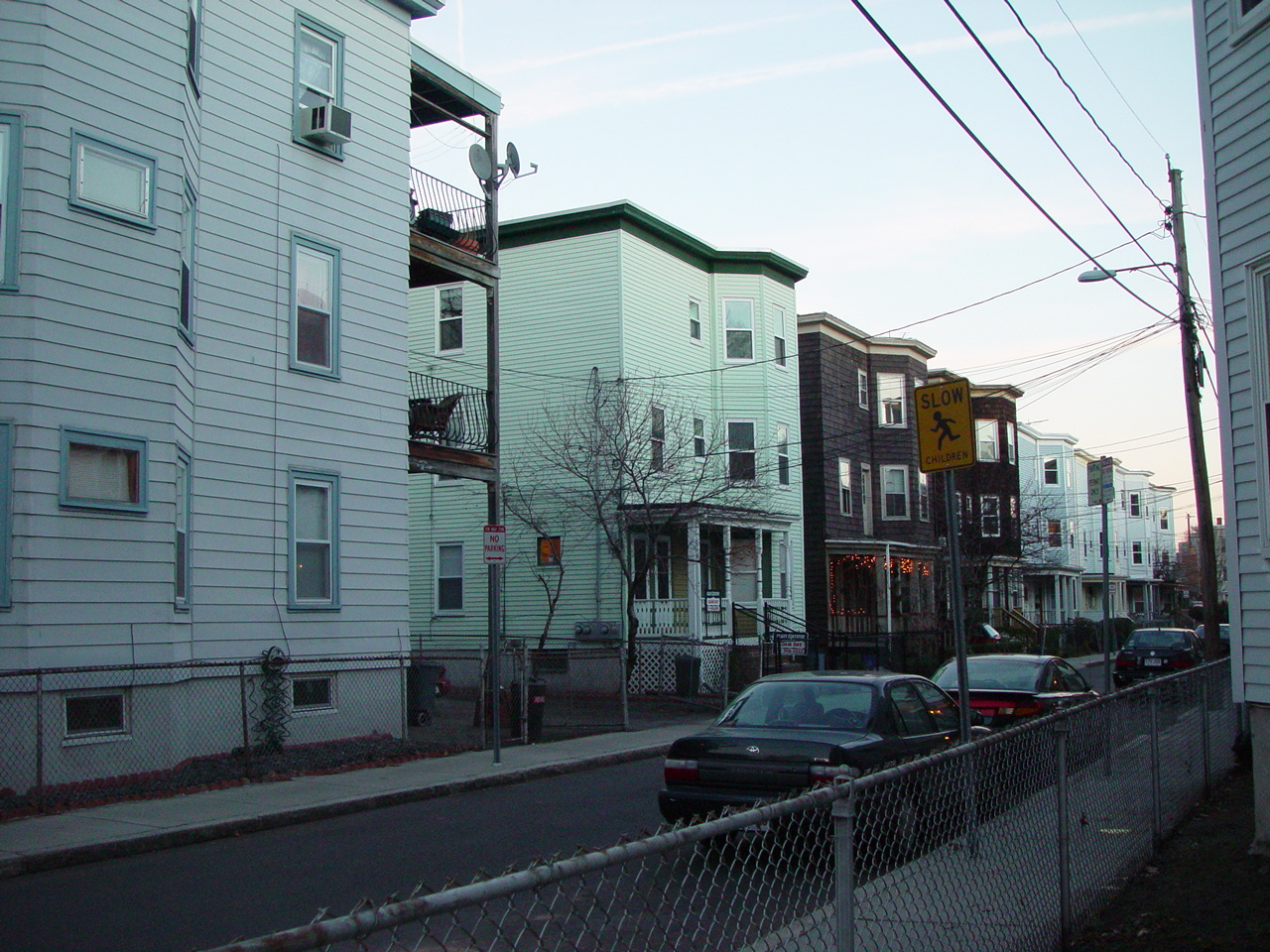
A row of flat-roofed three-deckers in Cambridge, Massachusetts

Three-deckers are usually defined by the style of their roofs, being either gable-, hip-, or flat-roofed, with preference often varying regionally. For instance, hipped and gabled three-deckers are dominant in Worcester. In smaller cities—such as Lawrence, Massachusetts, or Albany, New York—variants with two or two-and-a-half stories are common, while retaining a similar overall typology, with a bay window on the front, and prominent porches.

Various external features typify the three-decker. Windows are usually located on all four sides of the building, including a street-facing bay window on each floor. Utility porches are located in the rear, and typically not visible from the street. Some three-deckers feature a single front door that access all three units; others feature one entrance for the bottom floor and one that accesses the top two. While usually lacking the ornamentation found on other homes of the Victorian era, three-deckers were sometimes built with decorative details such as porch railings and posts.

Three-deckers are constructed from wood and typically use balloon framing, which makes them especially susceptible to destructive fires. Boston-based GBH News noted that "fire officials in Worcester, Fall River, Brockton and New Bedford all say a disproportionate majority of their structure fire response involves the buildings." Other common contributors to the flammability of three-deckers include primitive electrical systems such as knob-and-tube wiring, antiquated natural gas appliances such as gas-on-gas stoves, and petroleum-based shingle siding.

== Legacy ==
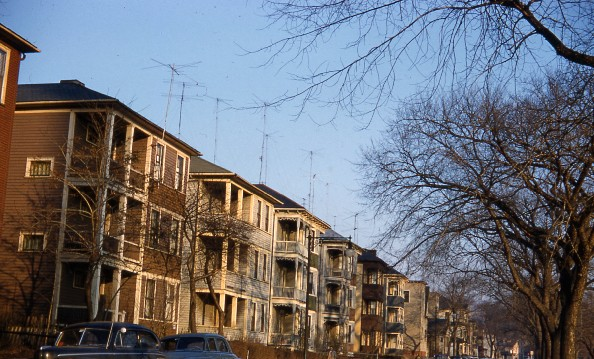
Three-decker streetscape in 1950s Worcester, Massachusetts

Three-deckers were built in large numbers, in some areas comprising entire neighborhoods, but by the 1950s, a number of them had been abandoned or razed primarily because of the invention of zoning, suburban growth, and urban renewal. Their reputation as poor quality and dangerous persisted into the 1970s. Starting in the early 1980s, however, they became desirable again as older streetcar suburbs began to gentrify, often by buyers looking for homes where they could live in one unit and rent the other two, thus helping them pay their mortgage. As condominiums became more common, many were converted into individually-owned units.

Since 1990, many three-deckers in Worcester, Massachusetts, have been listed on the National Register of Historic Places.

Recently, a new wave of three-decker apartment houses has been built in areas of Boston as an alternative to the townhouse style condominium or apartment buildings more typically associated with suburban areas. Boston's zoning regulations allow new three-family houses to be constructed in areas with existing three-deckers. However, zoning codes for the new buildings are far more stringent today, with requirements for fire sprinkler systems and handicap access, among other things. Somerville, Massachusetts re-legalized the structures in 2019 and removed many restrictions in 2023 to comply with the MBTA Communities Act.

== See also ==
- 5-over-1
- Affordable housing
- List of house types
- List of Registered Historic Places in Worcester, Massachusetts
- Polish flat
