= Forest Hill Cottage =

Historic house in Massachusetts, United States

- U.S. National Register of Historic Places
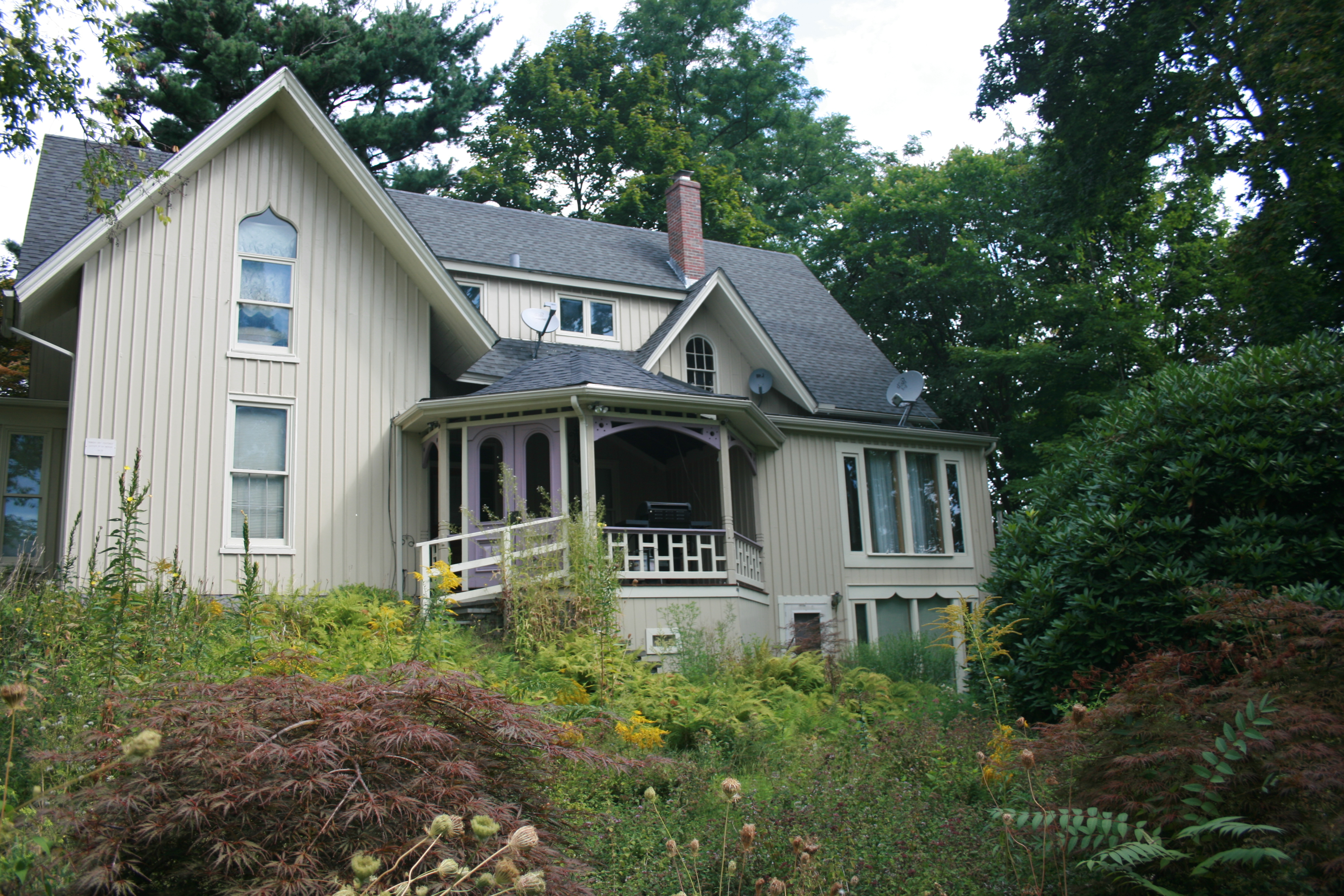

- Location within Massachusetts Location within the United States
- Location: 22 Windsor St., Worcester, Massachusetts
- Coordinates: 42°16′40″N 71°47′27″W
- Area: less than one acre
- Built: 1860
- Architectural style: Carpenter Gothic
- MPS: Worcester MRA
- NRHP reference No.: 80000529
- Added to NRHP: March 05, 1980

The Forest Hill Cottage is a historic cottage at 22 Windsor Street in Worcester, Massachusetts. The 1 1/2-story wood-frame house was built in 1860, and is one of the city's best examples of Carpenter Gothic design. It was listed on the National Register of Historic Places in 1980.

== Description and history ==
The Forest Hill Cottage is located in the hills of eastern Worcester, on the east side of Windsor Street near its junction with Forestdale Road. It is a 1-1/2 wood-frame structure, oriented facing south. It has asymmetrical massing, with varied steeply pitched gables, narrow arched windows, and board-and-batten siding. The street-facing facade has a three-window projecting rectangular window bay, while the front has a semi-octagonal porch that is a later 19th century addition. The gables originally had decorative bargeboard, which has been removed. Windows are in a variety of sizes and shapes, including some with round-arch tops, and others with pointed headers.

The house was built in 1860, and was probably originally a mirror image of the Soho Cottage, located just across the street. Its first owner, Luther Ross, was a patternmaker at the Court Mill. He apparently gave it the name "Forest Hill Cottage", and occupied it until 1886. The next owners were the Goughs, who owned it well into the 20th century.

== See also ==
- National Register of Historic Places listings in eastern Worcester, Massachusetts
