= Soho Cottage =

Historic house in Massachusetts, United States

- U.S. National Register of Historic Places
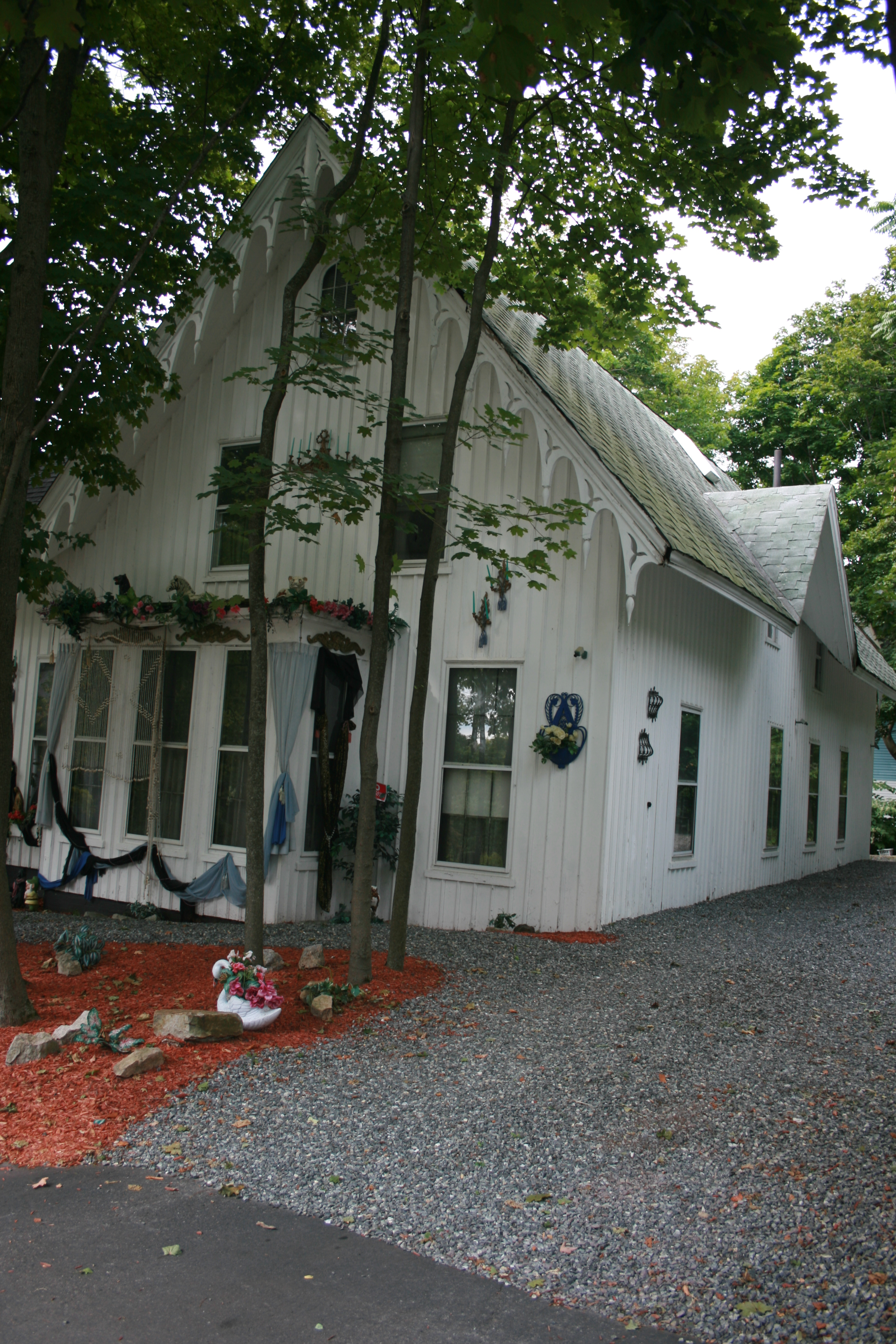

- Location within Massachusetts Location within the United States
- Location: 21 Windsor St., Worcester, Massachusetts
- Coordinates: 42°16′40″N 71°47′30″W
- Area: less than one acre
- Built: 1860
- Architectural style: Carpenter Gothic
- MPS: Worcester MRA
- NRHP reference No.: 80000528
- Added to NRHP: March 05, 1980

The Soho Cottage is a historic house at 21 Windsor Street in Worcester, Massachusetts. Built in 1860, it is one of the city's finest surviving examples of Carpenter Gothic architecture, owned and occupied for many years by a prominent local industrialist. The house was listed on the National Register of Historic Places in 1980.

== Description and history ==
The Soho Cottage is located northeast of downtown Worcester, at the northwest corner of Windsor Street and Forestdale Road in the Bell Hill neighborhood. It is a 1 1/2-story wood-frame structure, with a steeply pitched gabled roof and exterior clad in vertical board siding. The roof gables are adorned with drip-style bargeboard. A cross-gable section projects to the south on the right side, with a gabled wall dormer and oriel window to its left, flanking the main entrance. The facade facing Windsor Street includes a rectangular window bay with three sash windows on the front and one each on the sides. Windows in some of the gables are topped by either half-round or Gothic style arched elements.

The cottage was built in 1860, as a mirror image to the Forest Hill Cottage across Windsor Street (which has been more substantially altered). Its first owner was William Allen, an English immigrant who worked as a machinist and foreman in local factories. In 1875, Allen purchased the Worcester Boiler Works, which became one of the largest manufacturers of industrial boilers in New England. Allen remained in this house until his death in 1906.

== See also ==
- National Register of Historic Places listings in eastern Worcester, Massachusetts
