= Stephen C. Earle =

American architect (1839–1913)

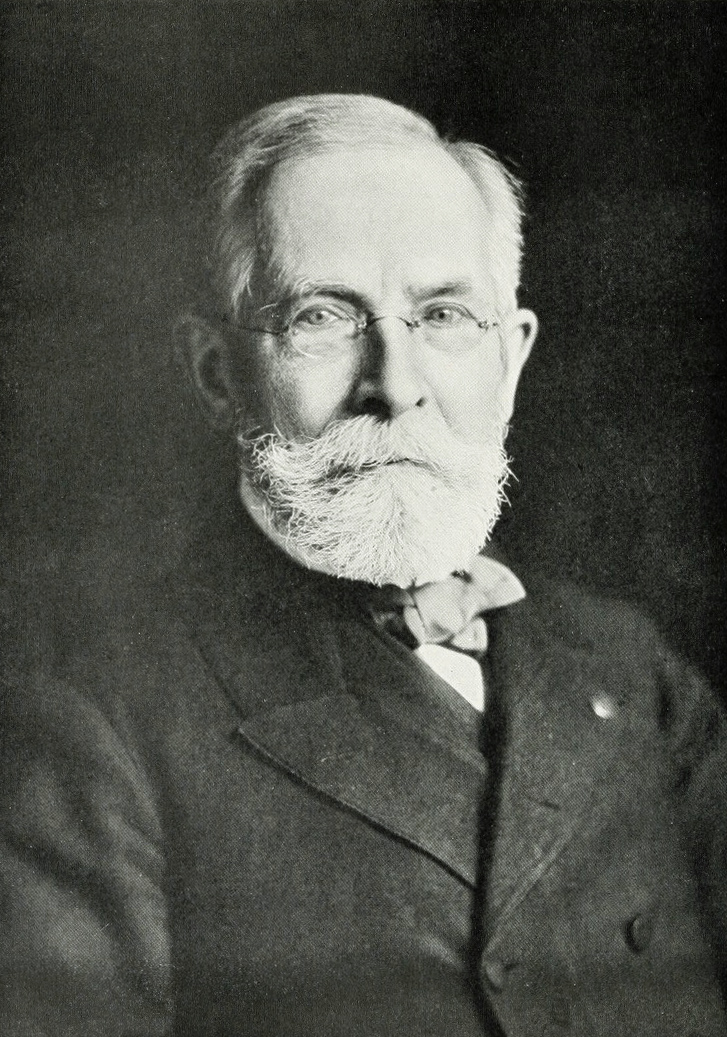
- Born: January 4, 1839; Leicester, Massachusetts, US
- Died: December 12, 1913 (aged 74); Worcester, Massachusetts, US
- Resting place: Quaker Cemetery
- Occupation: Architect
- Children: Ralph Earle, four other children
- Awards: Fellow, American Institute of Architects (1889)
- Buildings: Slater Memorial Museum; Jonas Clark Hall; Old Chapel; Whitcomb Mansion; Union Congregational Church; Pilgrim Congregational Church; Carroll Building
- Projects: Grinnell College

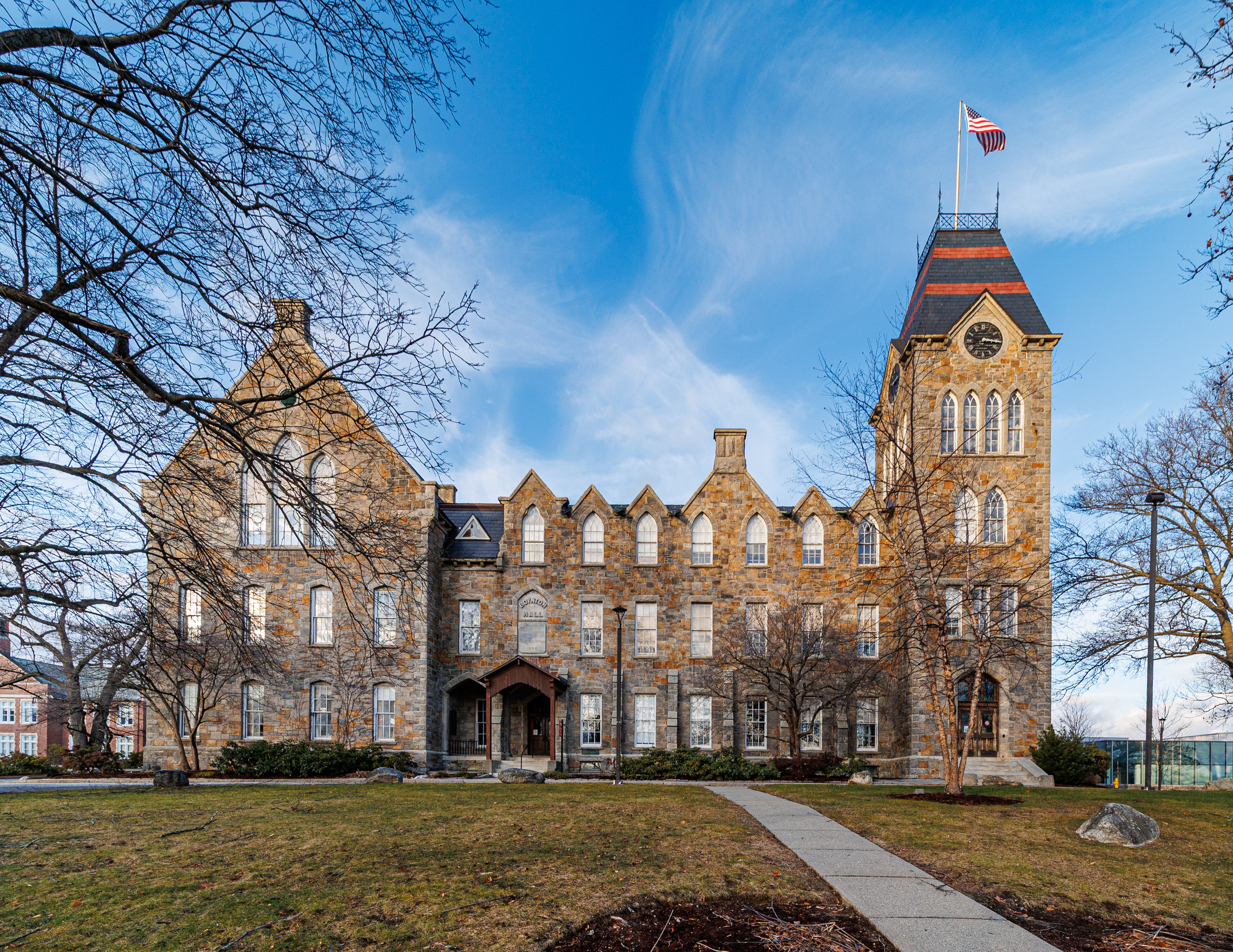
Boynton Hall of the Worcester Polytechnic Institute, designed by Earle & Fuller in the Victorian Gothic style and completed in 1868

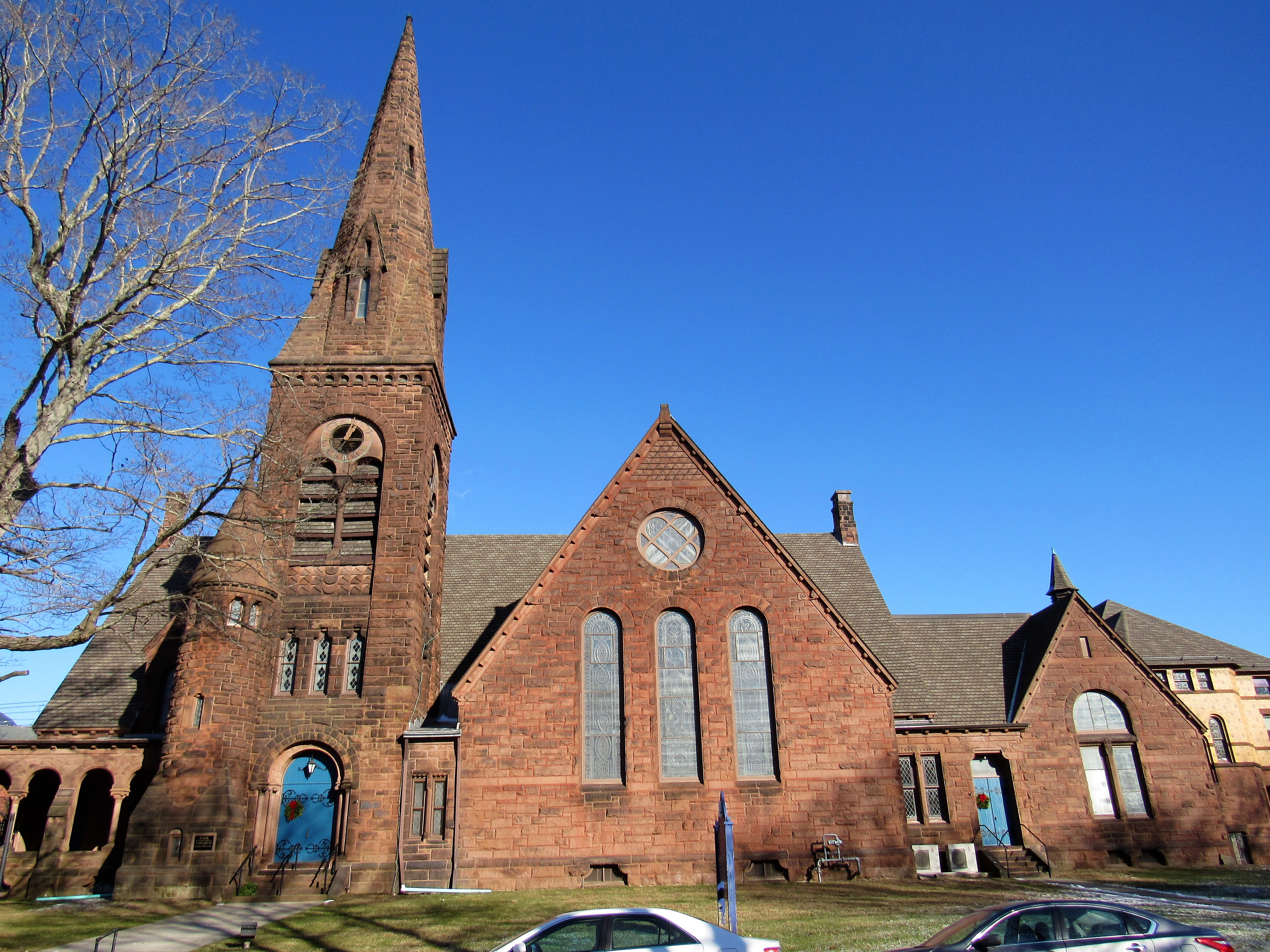
The Park Congregational Church in Norwich, Connecticut, designed by Earle & Fuller in the Richardsonian Romanesque style and completed in 1874

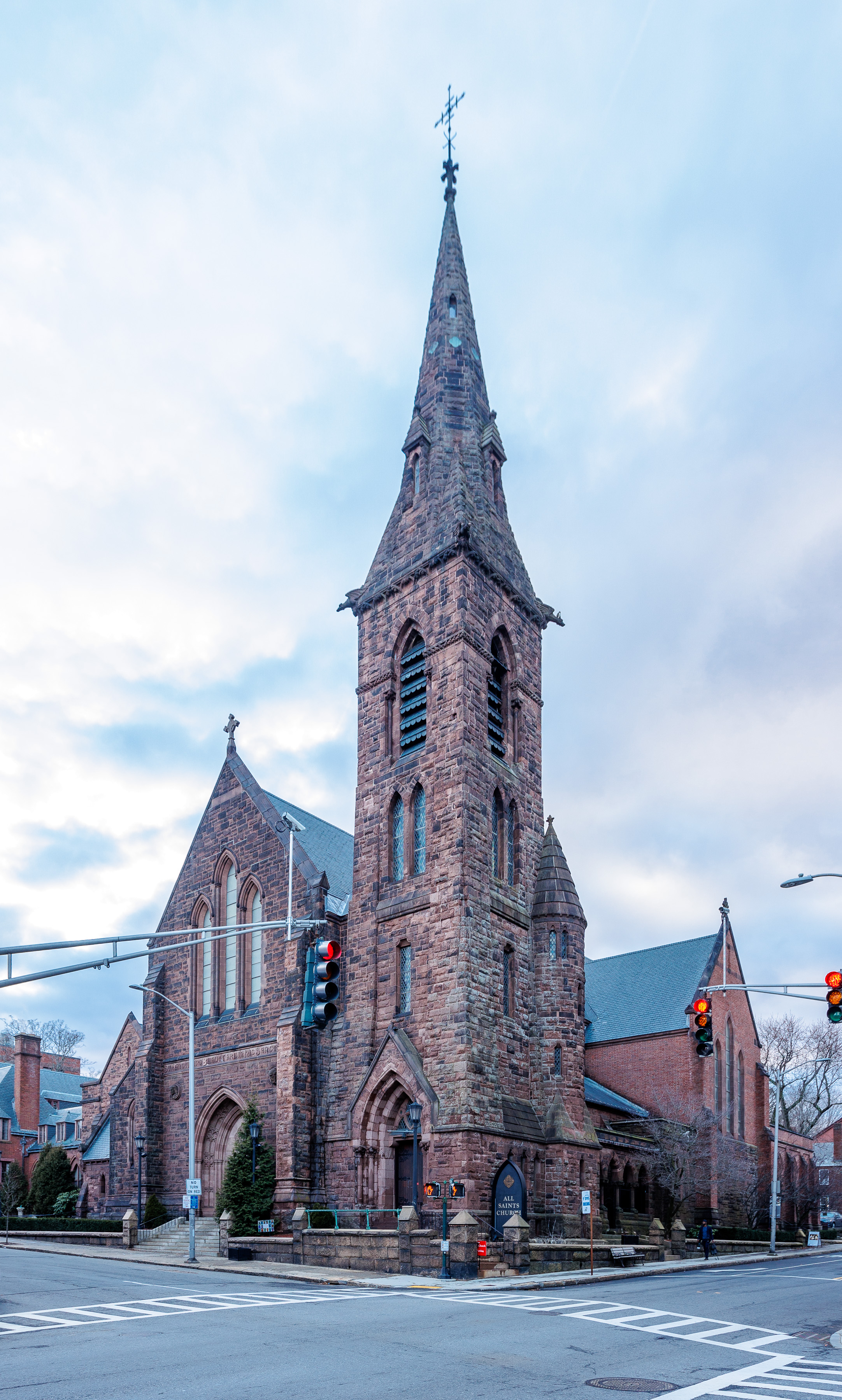
All Saints Episcopal Church in Worcester, designed by Earle & Fuller in the Victorian Gothic style and completed in 1877; a fire in 1932 destroyed all but the tower

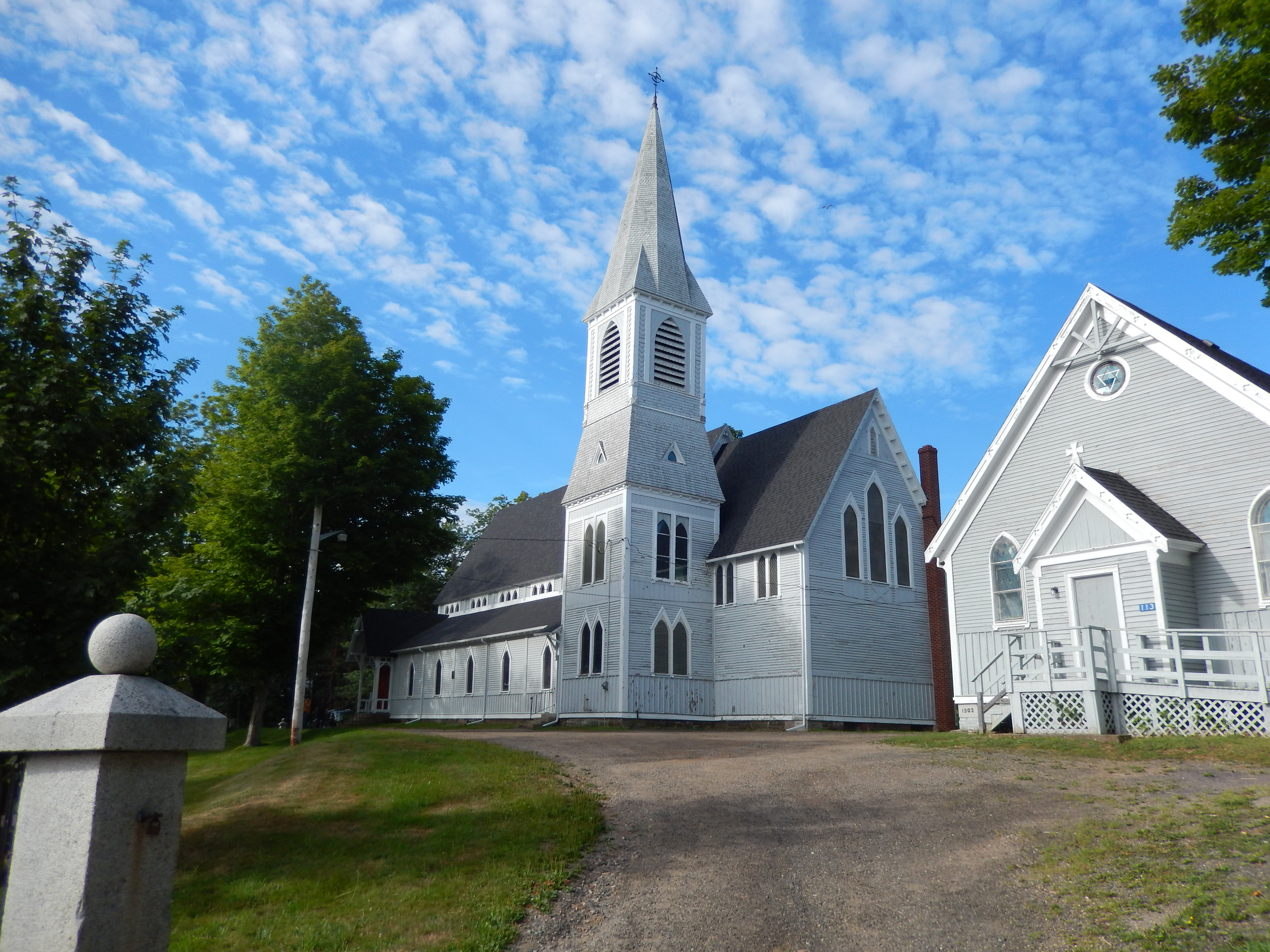
Trinity Anglican Church in Digby, Nova Scotia, designed by Earle in the Carpenter Gothic style and completed in 1879

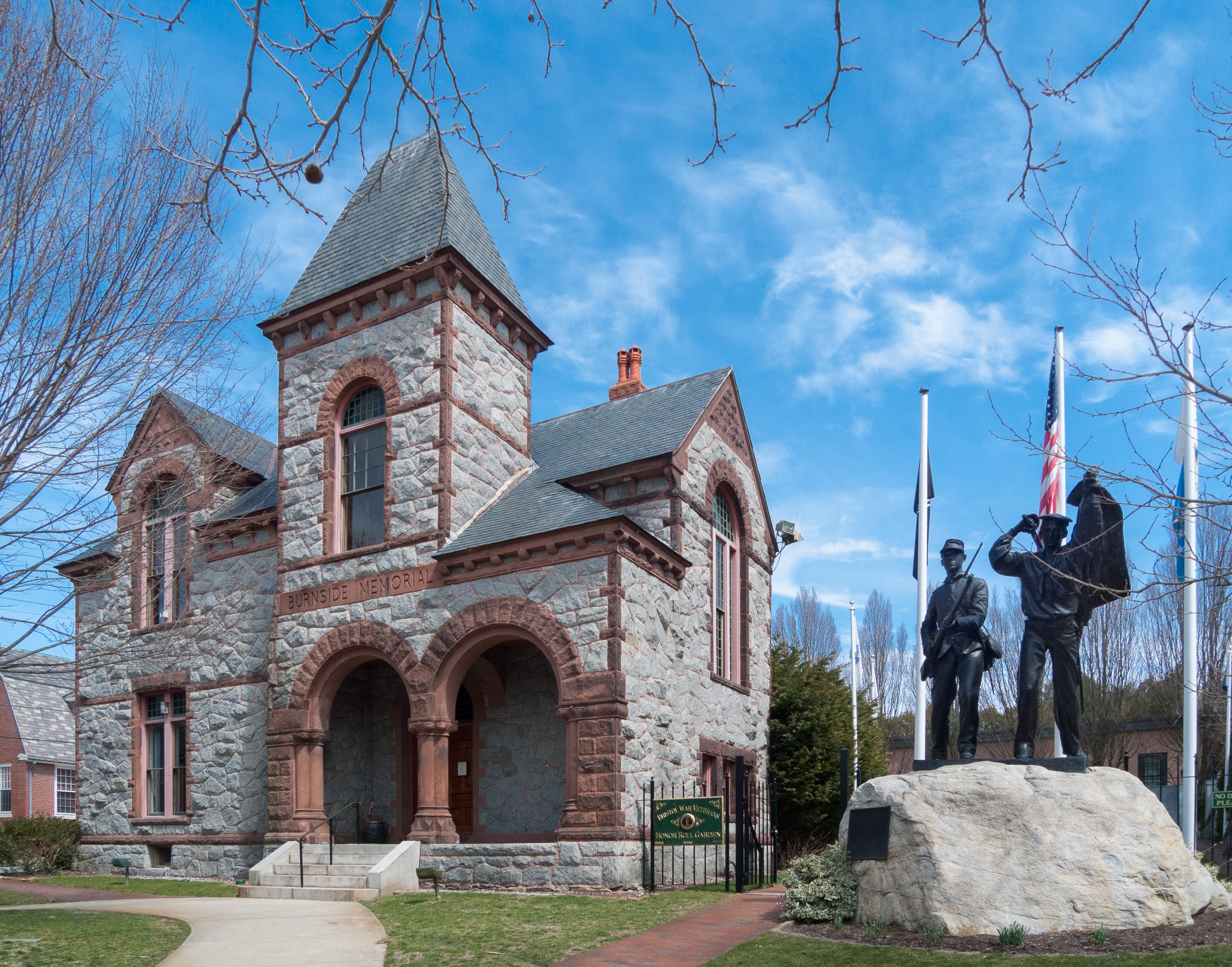
The Burnside Memorial Hall in Bristol, Rhode Island, designed by Earle in the Richardsonian Romanesque style and completed in 1883

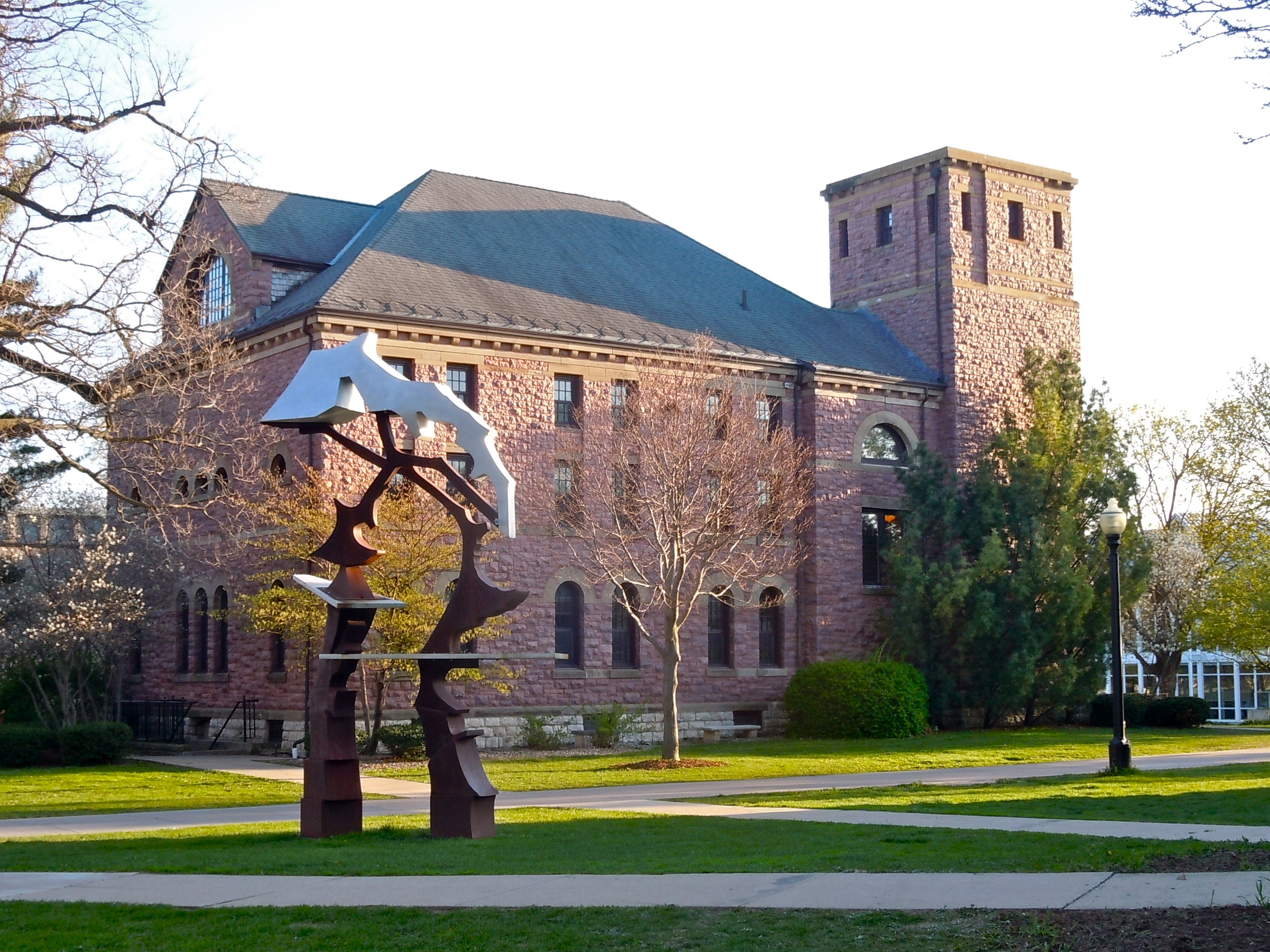
Goodnow Hall of Grinnell College, designed by Earle in the Richardsonian Romanesque style and completed in 1884

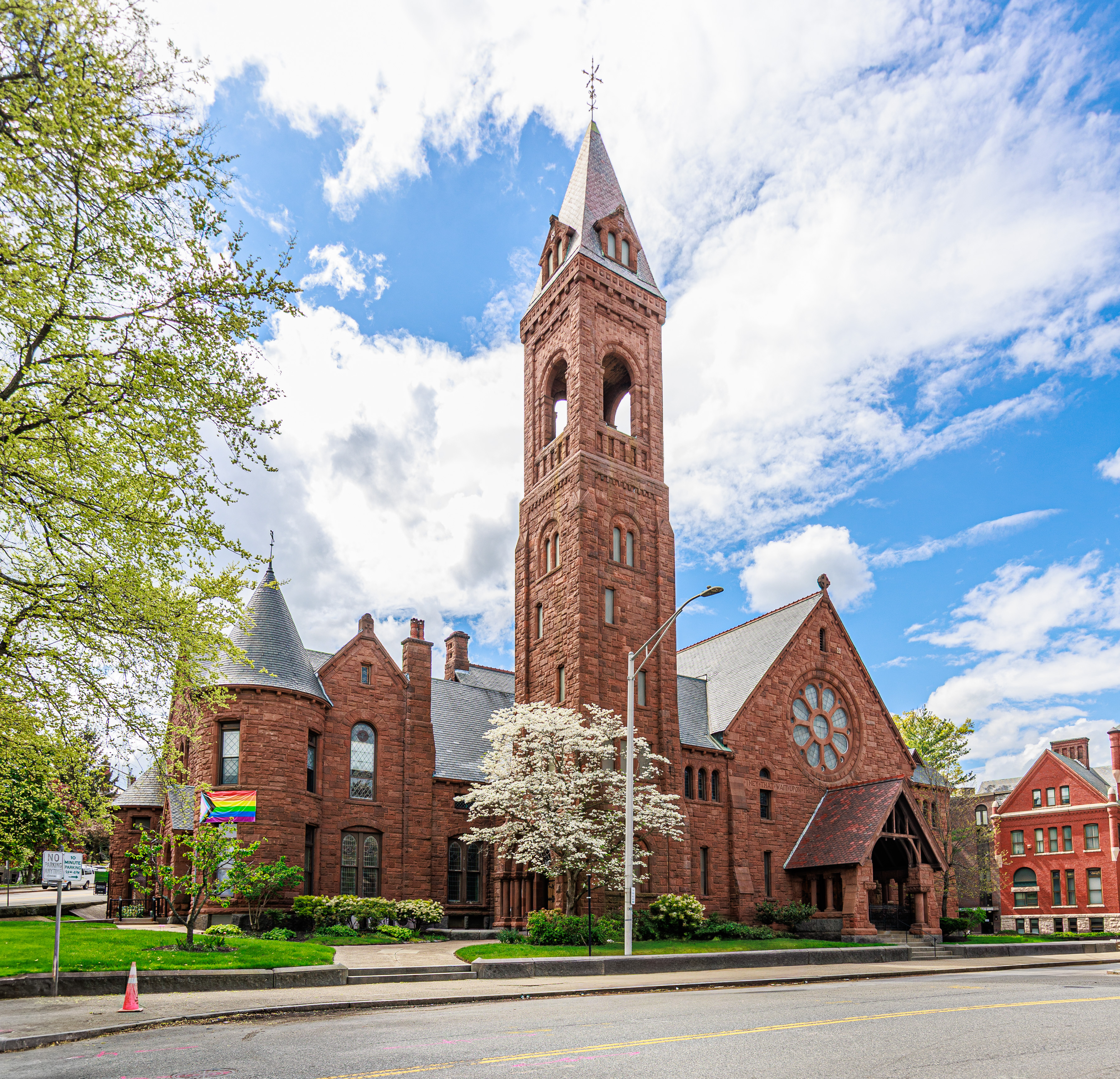
The former Central Congregational Church in Worcester, designed by Earle in the Richardsonian Romanesque style and completed in 1885

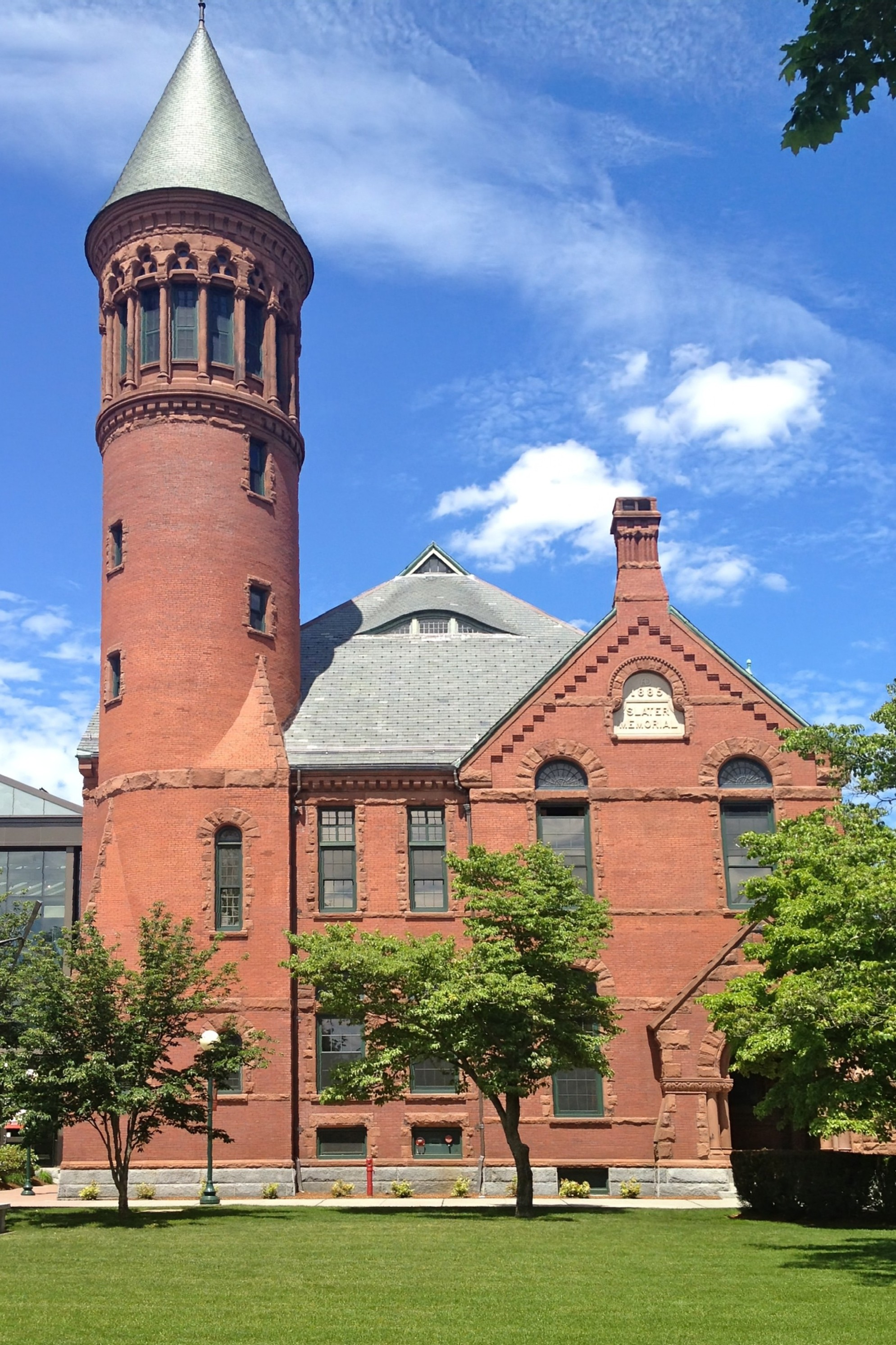
The Slater Memorial Museum of Norwich Free Academy, designed by Earle in the Richardsonian Romanesque style and completed in 1886

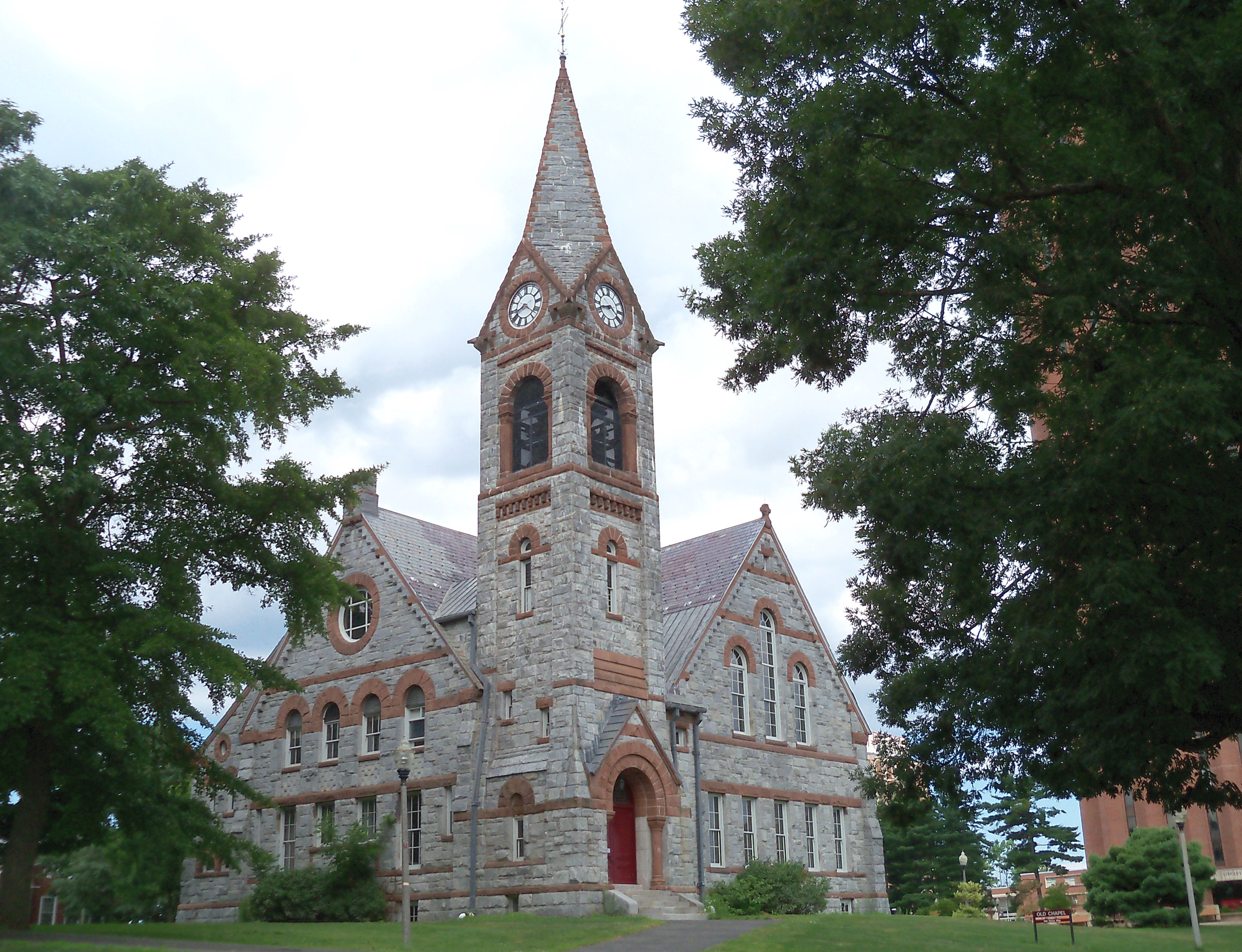
The Old Chapel of the University of Massachusetts Amherst, designed by Earle in the Richardsonian Romanesque style and completed in 1887

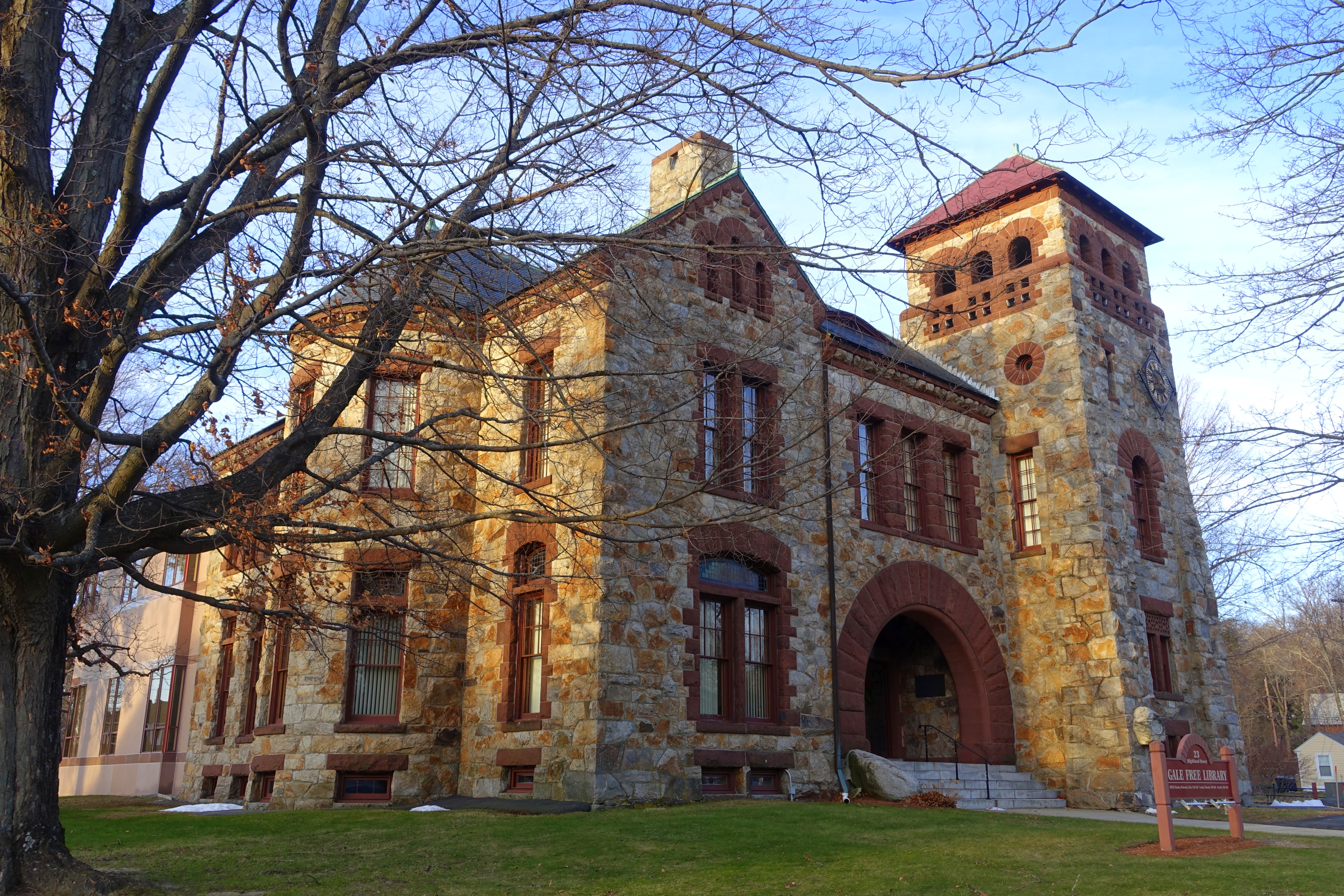
The Gale Free Library in Holden, designed by Earle in the Richardsonian Romanesque style and completed in 1888

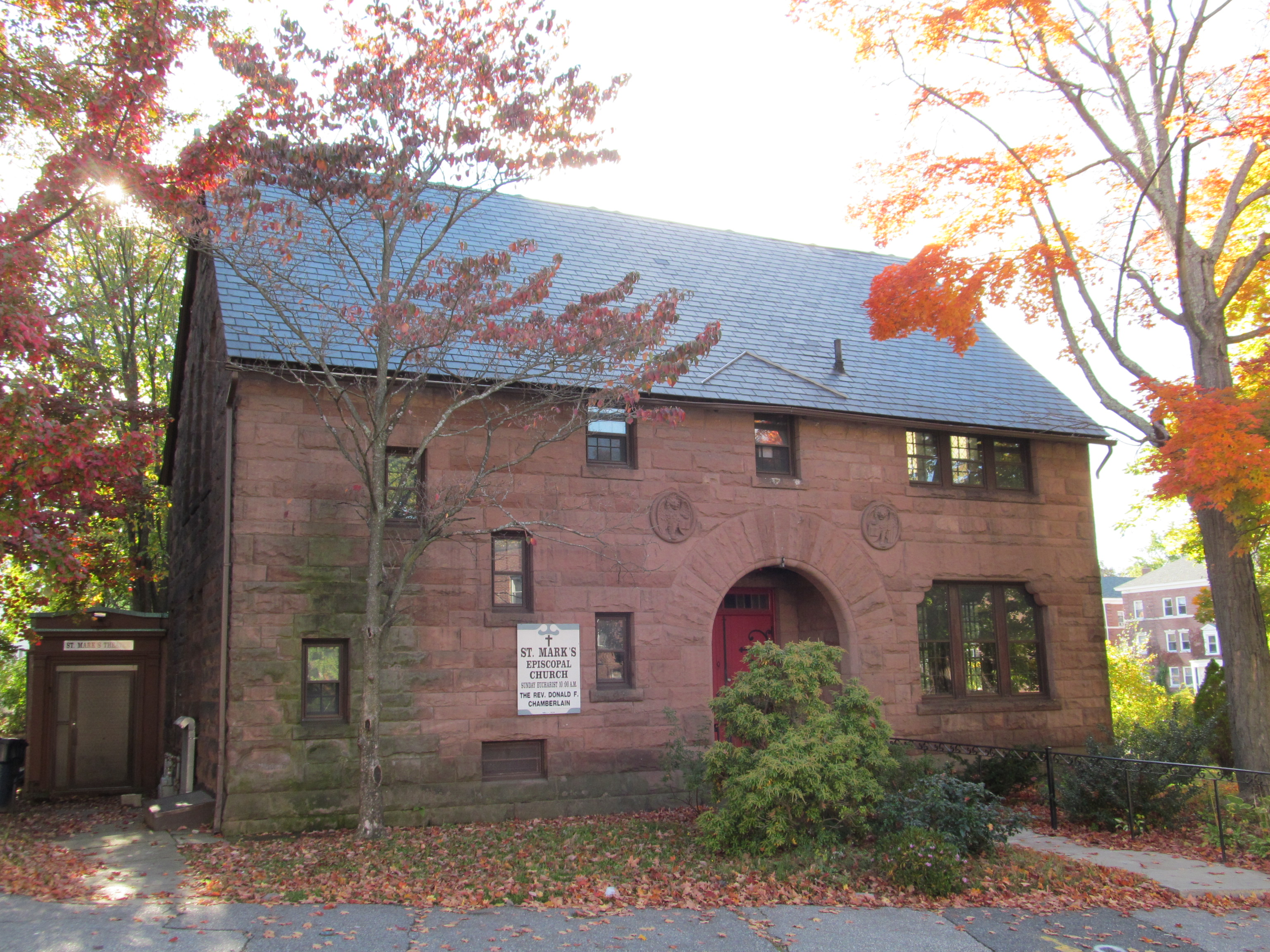
St. Mark's Episcopal Church in Worcester, designed by Earle in the Richardsonian Romanesque style and completed in 1889

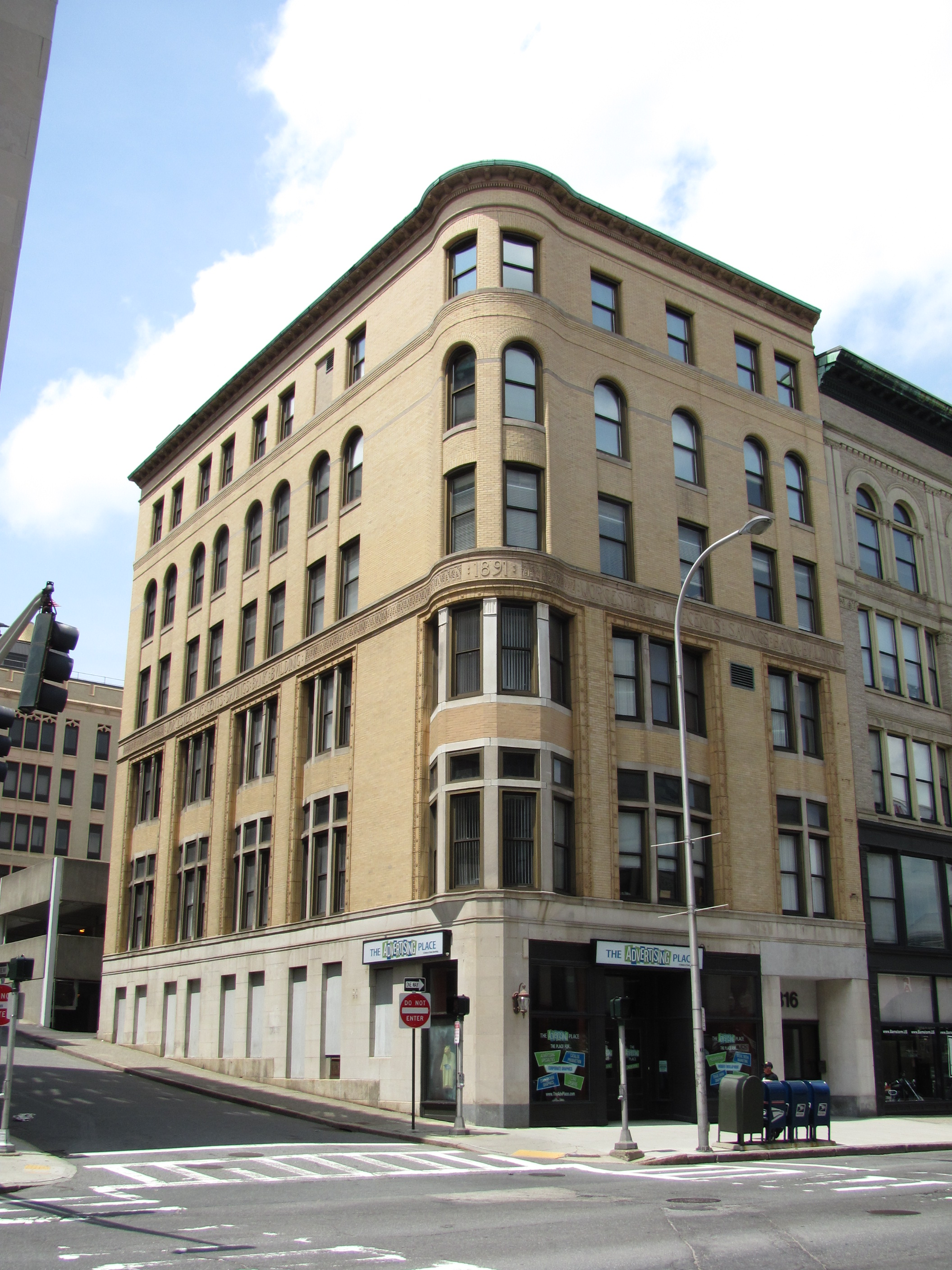
The Worcester Five Cents Savings Bank building, designed by Earle in the Renaissance Revival style and completed in 1892

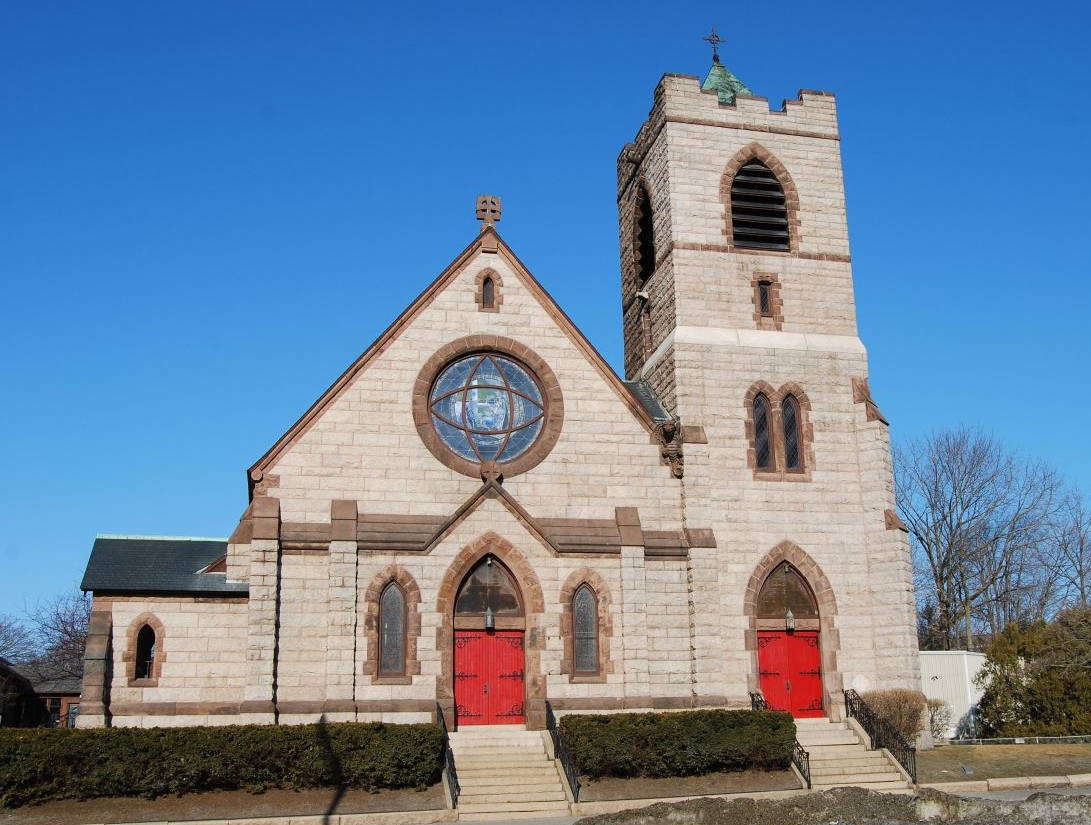
St. Matthew's Episcopal Church in Worcester, designed by Earle & Fisher in the Gothic Revival style and completed in 1894

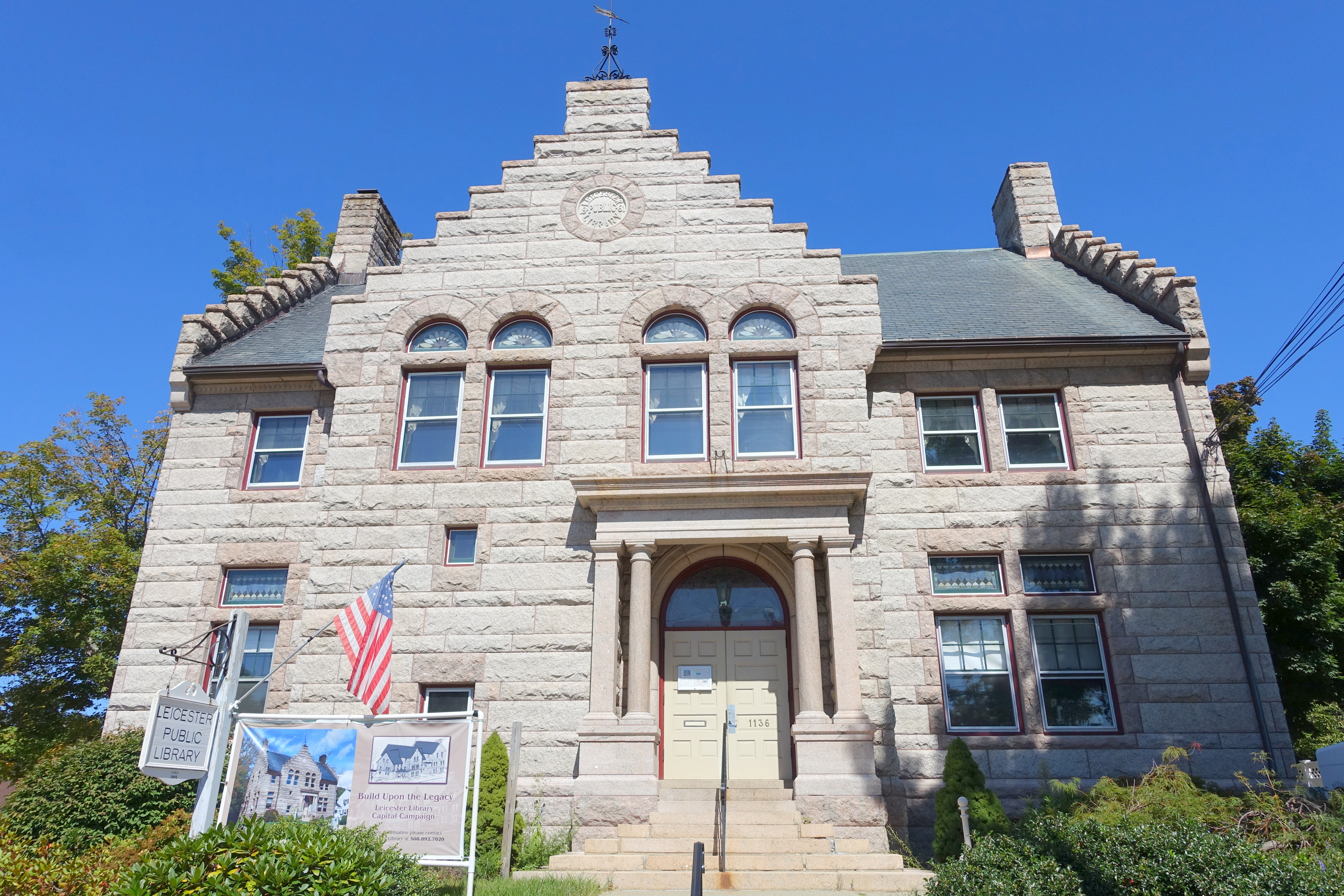
The Leicester Public Library, designed by Earle & Fisher in a hybrid Richardsonian Romanesque and Dutch Colonial Revival style and completed in 1896

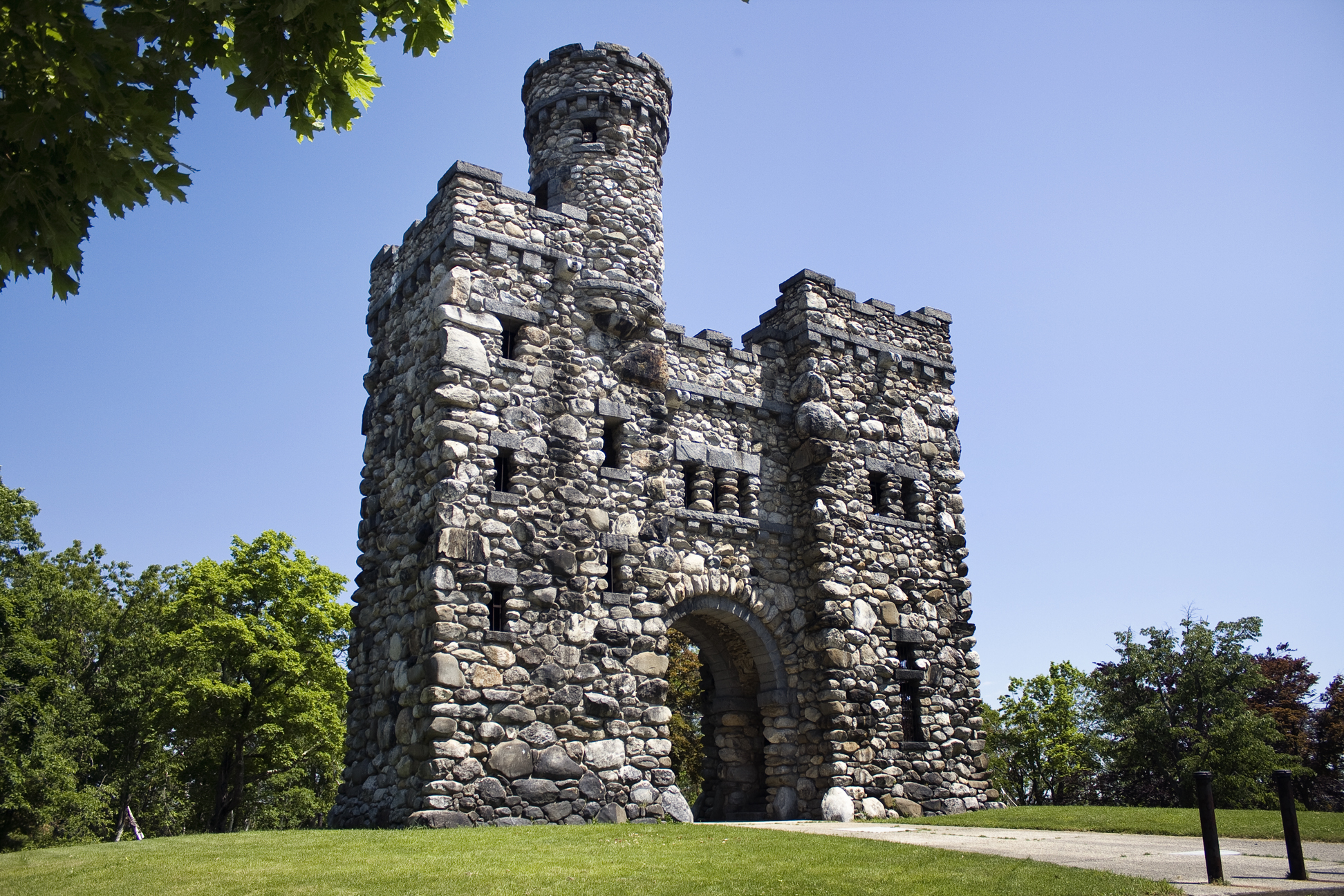
The Bancroft Tower in Salisbury Park, a folly designed by Earle & Fisher and completed in 1900

Stephen Carpenter Earle (January 4, 1839 – December 12, 1913) was an American architect based in Worcester, Massachusetts. During the late 19th century he had a large practice and was responsible for a wide variety of buildings built in New England and beyond. He practiced independently and as a senior partner of the firms of Earle & Fuller and Earle & Fisher. He is particularly remembered as a follower of the work of Henry Hobson Richardson.

== Life and career ==
Stephen Carpenter Earle was born January 4, 1839, in Leicester, Massachusetts, to Amos S. Earle, a manufacturer of hand cards and satinets, and Hannah Earle, née Carpenter. The larger Earle family members were prominent Quakers in central Massachusetts. When Earle was fourteen, his father died and he was sent to Worcester to live with his uncle, Edward Earle, later a mayor of Worcester. His mother and six younger siblings moved west to Oakland County, Michigan, to be near her brother. Having been first educated in the Leicester district school, Earle now finished his education at the Worcester High School and at the Moses Brown School, a Quaker boarding school in Providence, Rhode Island. He received his initial architectural training in the offices of Worcester and New York City architects, most notably that of Calvert Vaux. During the American Civil War, he served in the United States Army for eleven months in 1862 and 1863. Quakers being opposed to violence, some fellow members of the Worcester Friends Meeting moved to have him dismissed. He argued that he was "fight[ing] for peace" and the larger meeting chose to make an exception as he served chiefly in a medical capacity. After the war, he spent a year employed as a drafter for the recently restarted Hoosac Tunnel, followed by a year traveling in Europe.

In 1866 Earle returned to Worcester. In February, he opened an office of his own, and in March, he formed the partnership of Earle & Fuller with James E. Fuller. Shortly thereafter, they won a competition to design Boynton Hall (1868), the first building of the Worcester Polytechnic Institute (WPI). They also designed the former Orthodox Friends Meeting House (1868), now the Apostolic Faith Mission, in Brooklyn and All Saints Episcopal Church (1877, burned 1932). They served as supervising architects for the second Worcester High School (1871, demolished), an early work of Henry Hobson Richardson. In 1868 and 1869, Earle was enrolled in a special course in architecture at the just-opened Massachusetts Institute of Technology in Boston. From 1872 to 1885, a second office was maintained in Boston, expanding their geographic reach. Fuller withdrew from the partnership in 1876, Earle continuing independently.

During this second period, he completed one of his most noted works, the Richardsonian Romanesque Slater Memorial Museum (1886) on the campus of the Norwich Free Academy in Norwich, Connecticut, where he had a generous budget and a sympathetic patron. In 2015, the Hartford Courant called the Slater Museum the "crown jewel among Norwich's cultural treasures" and "a masterpiece of Romanesque revival design." In 1891 he formed the partnership of Earle & Fisher with Clellan W. Fisher, an architect previously in practice in Burlington, Vermont. This was dissolved in 1903.

According to his son Ralph, his chief specialty was in the design of churches. In Worcester, these included Pilgrim Congregational (1887, NRHP-listed), St. Mark's Episcopal (1889, NRHP-listed), South Unitarian (1894, NRHP-listed), St. Matthew's Episcopal (1894, NRHP-listed) and Union Congregational (1897, NRHP-listed). Elsewhere he designed Park Congregational (1874) in Norwich, Connecticut, the Old Chapel (1887) of the University of Massachusetts Amherst and Pilgrim Congregational (1893, NRHP-listed) in Dorchester, Boston. He designed the former Worcester Public Library (1890, demolished), small town libraries in Connecticut, Massachusetts, and Rhode Island, the Worcester Art Museum (1898), and the Bancroft Tower (1900, NRHP-listed). For philanthropist Edward A. Goodnow of Princeton he designed two buildings far from home: Goodnow Hall (1884, NRHP-listed) of Grinnell College in Iowa and Goodnow Hall, Wellington (1886) of the Huguenot College in Wellington, South Africa.

During the nineteenth century, a period of great growth in Worcester, Earle succeeded Elbridge Boyden as the leading architect of central Massachusetts. During the early years of the 20th century, Worcester's growth slowed, and Earle gradually lost ground to other local architects, though he remained active until his death in 1913. Among his last works was the conversion of the Bull mansion into the Grand Army of the Republic Hall (1912, NRHP-listed), a building originally designed by his early employer Vaux.

== Personal life and death ==
Earle was married in 1869 to Mary L. Brown. They had five children, including four sons and one daughter. Their second son, Ralph, served as a rear admiral in the United States Navy and was president of WPI from 1925 to 1939. Earle's parents and extended family were Quakers, and he was brought up in that faith. He joined the Episcopal Church shortly before his marriage. He was a parishioner of All Saints, the building of which he designed.

Earle was a founding director of the Worcester Co-operative Bank and served continuously as its president from 1888; he was also a treasurer and director of the Worcester YMCA. He was a Fellow of the American Institute of Architects, serving as Worcester chapter president for many years, and was a member of the Grand Army of the Republic and the Worcester Society of Antiquity.

In December 1913, Earle contracted pneumonia. He died on December 12, 1913, at Memorial Hospital at the age of 74. He is buried in the Quaker Cemetery in Leicester.

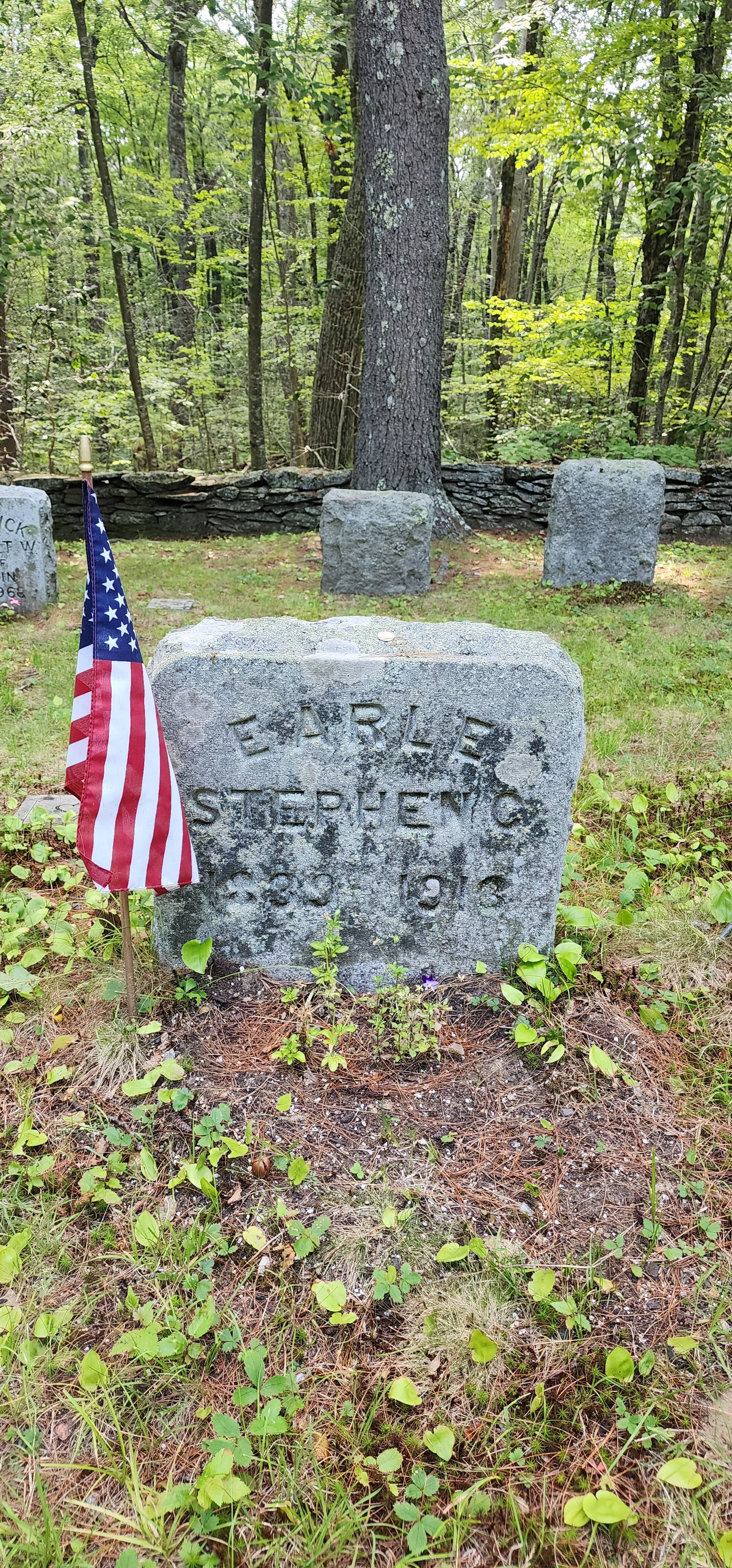
The grave of Stephen C. Earle at the Quaker Cemetery in Leicester, MA, 2025

== Earle and Richardson ==
Earle is best remembered for his work in the Richardsonian Romanesque style. He was one of the earliest of the many admirers and imitators of the work of Henry Hobson Richardson, likely derived from their early association with the Worcester High School (1871), designed and built when both architects were in the earliest phases of their careers. His first work in the emerging Richardsonian Romanesque style was the Park Congregational Church (1874) in Norwich, Connecticut, which was closely modeled on Richardson's North Congregational Church (1873) in Springfield, Massachusetts, though varying in details. Earle would have had the opportunity to study this church, as he was beginning the Grace Methodist Episcopal Church (1875, demolished) in Springfield as it was being completed.

Some architectural historians have seen him as a not entirely successful follower of Richardson. William H. Jordy, in reference to the Burnside Memorial Hall (1883) in Bristol, Rhode Island, wrote that "architects could always replicate the forms of...Richardson...but seldom [his] spirit. With its simplified silhouette, strong hipped roof and rugged walls, Burnside Memorial Hall strains for Richardson's sublime simplicity, but...shows the raucousness and nervous energy of an architect whose training was in the Gothic Revival." This, however, falls into the trap identified by Paul Clifford Larson, where a Richardsonian building is judged only by its relation to Richardson himself: "any building that shows Richardson's influence...[is] dismissed as imitative if it looks too much like its prototypes and condemned as provincial if it wanders too far away from Richardson's practice." Larson argues that each building should be judged "on its own merits and within the context of its own period, place and architectural values." Earle's biographer, Curtis Dahl of Wheaton College, describes his "magnificent" Central Congregational Church (1885) as a building in which "each element is finely delineated, but...worked into a carefully thought out plan...pattern, variation and fine workmanship are everywhere...there is no sense of ostentation or busyness." The two buildings that have been identified as Earle's finest are both Richardsonian: according to Dahl, this is the Central Congregational Church, while the curators of the Slater Memorial Museum (1886) consider it to be their own building.

== Legacy ==
Earle had a significant influence on the training of architects and others associated with building in Worcester. He taught architecture and drafting in the Worcester night schools, and at least one Worcester architect, George H. Clemence, was directly trained in his office.

== Selected works ==
He designed university buildings, commercial buildings, churches, and more. Among his university clients were Clark University, Worcester Polytechnic Institute, and Grinnell College.

=== Worcester, Massachusetts ===
- 1868 – Boynton Hall, Worcester Polytechnic Institute
- 1869 – Fence, Hope Cemetery
  - NRHP-listed.
- 1877 – All Saints Episcopal Church, Irving Street
  - Earle's home parish. Excluding the tower, the building was destroyed by a fire in 1932. A new church, designed by Frohman, Robb & Little, incorporated Earle's tower and was completed in 1934.
- 1880 – D. Wheeler Swift House, Oak Avenue
  - NRHP-listed.
- 1880 – Whitcomb Mansion, Harvard Street
  - NRHP-listed.
- 1882 – Salisbury Factory Building 2, Union Street
  - NRHP-listed.
- 1885 – Armsby Block, Main Street
  - NRHP-listed.
- 1885 – Central Congregational Church (former), Institute Road
  - As of 2025, the Worcester Area Mission Society. The congregation, now the United Congregational Church, worships in the chapel of their former building. A contributing property to the NRHP-listed Institutional District.
- 1888 – Pilgrim Congregational Church, Main Street
  - NRHP-listed.
- 1888 – Salisbury Laboratories, Worcester Polytechnic Institute
- 1889 – Jonas Clark Hall, Clark University
  - According to Amy Tanner, a Clark University professor and its historian, that though Earle was formally the architect he "expressly disclaim[ed] any responsibility for the building."
- 1889 – St. Mark's Episcopal Church, Freeland Street
  - NRHP-listed.
- 1890 – Pleasant Street Baptist Church, Pleasant Street
- 1891 – Church of Our Savior (former), Laurel Street
  - The first Armenian church in the western hemisphere. As of 2025, the Russian Orthodox Church of the Holy Resurrection.
- 1892 – Park Congregational Church (former), Elm Street
  - As of 2025, the Grace Christian Center.
- 1892 – Worcester Five Cents Savings Bank, Main Street
  - NRHP-listed, also a contributing property to the NRHP-listed Mechanics' Hall District.
- 1893 – Worcester Young Women's Christian Association, Chatham Street
  - In 1964 Earle's building was demolished to the level of the first floor. What remains of his part of the building, and the later part (1915) by George H. Clemence, is NRHP-listed.
- 1894 – South Unitarian Church (former), Main Street
  - As of 2025, the Worcester Central Spanish SDA Church. NRHP-listed.
- 1894 – St. Matthew's Episcopal Church, Southbridge Street
  - NRHP-listed.
- 1894 – Stratton Hall, Worcester Polytechnic Institute
- 1896 – John Legg House, Claremont Street
  - NRHP-listed.
- 1897 – Union Congregational Church, Chestnut Street
  - NRHP-listed.
- 1898 – Worcester Art Museum, Salisbury Street
  - Earle's building is now substantially hidden by later additions. A contributing property to the NRHP-listed Institutional District.
- 1899 – Providence Street Firehouse, Providence Street
  - NRHP-listed.
- 1900 – Bancroft Tower, Salisbury Park
  - NRHP-listed.
- 1908 – Worcester Friends Meeting (former), Oxford Street
  - As of 2025, the Bethsaida Christian Center. A contributing property to the NRHP-listed Oxford-Crown Historic District.
- 1912 – First Swedish Baptist Church (former), Belmont Street
  - As of 2025, the Journey Community Church.
- 1912 – Grand Army of the Republic Hall (former), Pearl Street
  - NRHP-listed.

=== Other Massachusetts ===
- 1869 – All Saints Episcopal Church, North Adams
  - A contributing property to the NRHP-listed Monument Square–Eagle Street Historic District.
- 1871 – Rock Castle School, Webster
  - NRHP-listed.
- 1873 – Oxford Town Hall, Oxford
  - A contributing property to the NRHP-listed Oxford Main Street Historic District.
- 1875 – Grace Methodist Episcopal Church, Springfield
  - Demolished.
- 1879 – Canton Town Hall, Canton
- 1881 – Christ Episcopal Church, Medway
  - A contributing property to the NRHP-listed Medway Village Historic District.
- 1882 – Monson Free Library, Monson
- 1884 – Princeton Public Library, Princeton
  - A contributing property to the NRHP-listed Princeton Center Historic District.
- 1884 – Trinity Episcopal Church, Bridgewater
- 1885 – Old Chapel, University of Massachusetts Amherst, Amherst
  - NRHP-listed.
- 1886 – Bagg Hall, Princeton
  - A contributing property to the NRHP-listed Princeton Center Historic District.
- 1888 – Gale Free Library, Holden
  - A contributing property to the NRHP-listed Holden Center Historic District.
- 1888 – Norton Public Library (former), Norton
  - A contributing property to the NRHP-listed Norton Center Historic District.
- 1891 – St. Mary's Catholic Church, Holden
- 1893 – Pilgrim Congregational Church, Dorchester, Boston
  - NRHP-listed, also a contributing property to the NRHP-listed Uphams Corner Historic District.
- 1893 – Sacred Heart Catholic Church, Gardner
- 1896 – Leicester Public Library, Leicester
- 1896 – West Falmouth Library, West Falmouth
  - A contributing property to the NRHP-listed West Falmouth Village Historic District.
- 1901 – First Congregational Church, Leicester
  - A contributing property to the NRHP-listed Washburn Square–Leicester Common Historic District.
- 1903 – American Optical Company administration building, Southbridge
  - Earle also designed the flanking wings, used for manufacturing purposes, completed in phases in 1900, 1901 and 1902. A contributing property to the NRHP-listed American Optical Company Historic District.

=== Connecticut ===
- 1874 – Park Congregational Church, Norwich
  - Modeled on the North Congregational Church (1873) in Springfield, Massachusetts, designed by Henry Hobson Richardson. A contributing property to the NRHP-listed Chelsea Parade Historic District.
- 1885 – Slater Library, Jewett City
  - NRHP-listed.
- 1886 – Slater Memorial Museum, Norwich Free Academy, Norwich
  - A contributing property to the NRHP-listed Chelsea Parade Historic District.
- 1887 – Carroll Building, Norwich
  - NRHP-listed, also a contributing property to the NRHP-listed Downtown Norwich Historic District.
- 1890 – Bill Memorial Library, Groton
  - A contributing property to the NRHP-listed Groton Bank Historic District.

=== Rhode Island ===
- 1877 – Rogers Free Library, Bristol
  - A contributing property to the NRHP-listed Bristol Waterfront Historic District.
- 1881 – Church of the Epiphany Episcopal (former), Providence
  - As of 2025, the Truth Tabernacle.
- 1883 – Burnside Memorial Hall, Bristol
  - Dedicated by President Chester A. Arthur and Governor Augustus O. Bourn to the memory of Ambrose Burnside. A contributing property to the NRHP-listed Bristol Waterfront Historic District.

=== Other states ===
- 1868 – Orthodox Friends Meeting House (former), Brooklyn, New York
  - As of 2025, the Apostolic Faith Mission.
- 1879 – James Schouler cottage, Kilbarchan, North Conway, New Hampshire
- 1884 – First Church of Christ Congregational, North Conway, New Hampshire
- 1884 – Goodnow Hall, Grinnell College, Grinnell, Iowa
  - NRHP-listed.

=== Abroad ===
- 1879 – Trinity Anglican Church, Digby, Nova Scotia
  - A notable regional example of the Carpenter Gothic style. A National Historic Site of Canada.
- 1884 – Christ Church Anglican, Windsor, Nova Scotia
  - For their church, the Windsor congregation acquired a copy of the plans of the Digby church free of charge from Earle, on the condition they not be modified in any way.
- 1886 – Goodnow Hall, Wellington, Huguenot College, Wellington, South Africa
  - A national heritage site of South Africa.
- 1894 – St. Paul's Anglican Church, Trinity, Newfoundland and Labrador
  - A replica of the Digby and Windsor churches, built without contribution by Earle.
