= George Whitcomb (disambiguation) =

George Dexter Whitcomb (1834–1914) was an American industrialist and founder of Glendora, California

George Whitcomb is also the name of:

- George H. Whitcomb, a Worcester, Massachusetts, businessman and philanthropist, founder of Whitcomb Mansion
- George C. Whitcomb, an 1862 defender of the Forest City Stockade
- George Whitcomb, early colonist of Montagu Bay, Tasmania
- George Whitcomb, player in the 1898 Michigan Wolverines football team
- George Whitcomb, designer of Ross E. Bonham House, a historic building in Carmel-by-the-Sea, California

== See also ==
- George Whitcombe (1902–1986), Welsh footballer
