= South Unitarian Church =

Historic church in Massachusetts, United States

- South Unitarian
- U.S. National Register of Historic Places
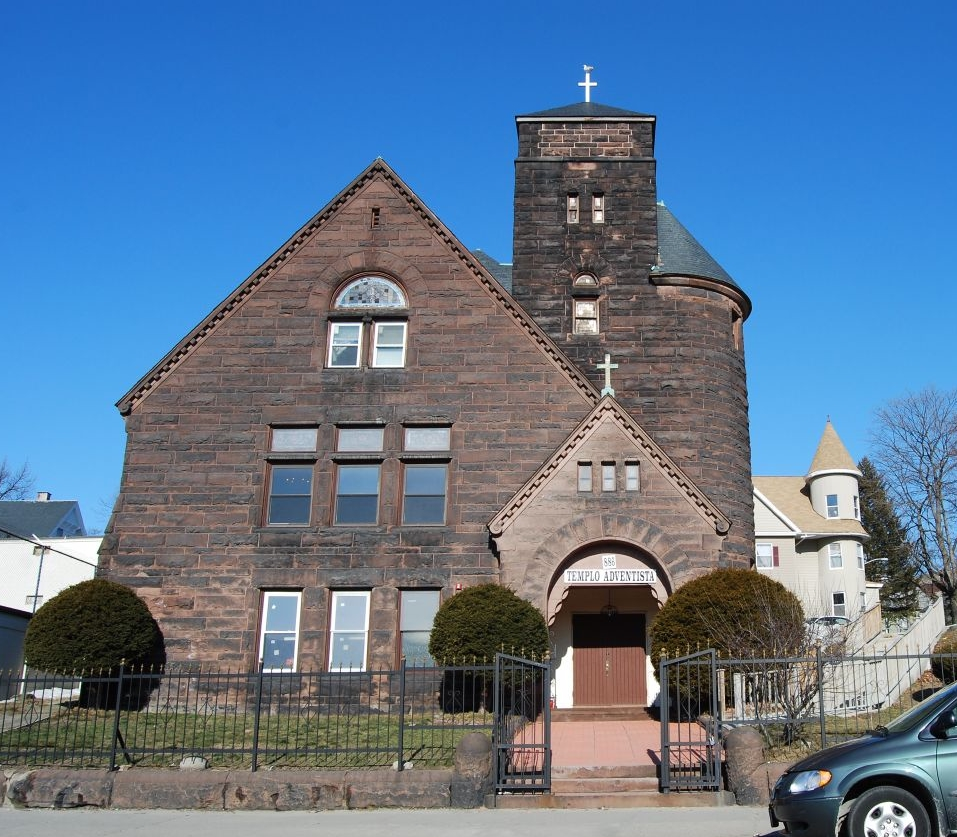

- Location within Massachusetts Location within the United States
- Location: 888 Main St., Worcester, Massachusetts
- Coordinates: 42°15′11″N 71°49′5″W
- Area: less than one acre
- Built: 1894
- Architect: Earle & Fisher
- Architectural style: Romanesque Revival
- MPS: Worcester MRA
- NRHP reference No.: 80000550
- Added to NRHP: March 5, 1980

The South Unitarian Church is an historic church building at 888 Main Street in the Main South neighborhood of Worcester, Massachusetts. The Romanesque Revival building was designed by Earle & Fisher and was built by the Norcross Brothers in 1894 for the South Unitarian Society, established in 1890. The building is made of sandstone blocks, laid in courses alternating in width. The front (eastern) facade features a high pitched gable, with two rows of three windows, then a pair of windows topped by a large half-round window To the right is the church entrance, a smaller projecting gable section with a doorway recessed in a round archway, topped by three smaller windows. To the rear behind the entrance is a square tower with a partial half-round side tower.

On March 5, 1980, it was added to the National Register of Historic Places as South Unitarian. At the time of its listing it housed an Armenian Apostolic congregation; it presently houses a Spanish Seventh Day Adventist Congregation.

== See also ==
- National Register of Historic Places listings in southwestern Worcester, Massachusetts
- National Register of Historic Places listings in Worcester County, Massachusetts
