= Goodnow Hall (Grinnell College) =

- U.S. National Register of Historic Places
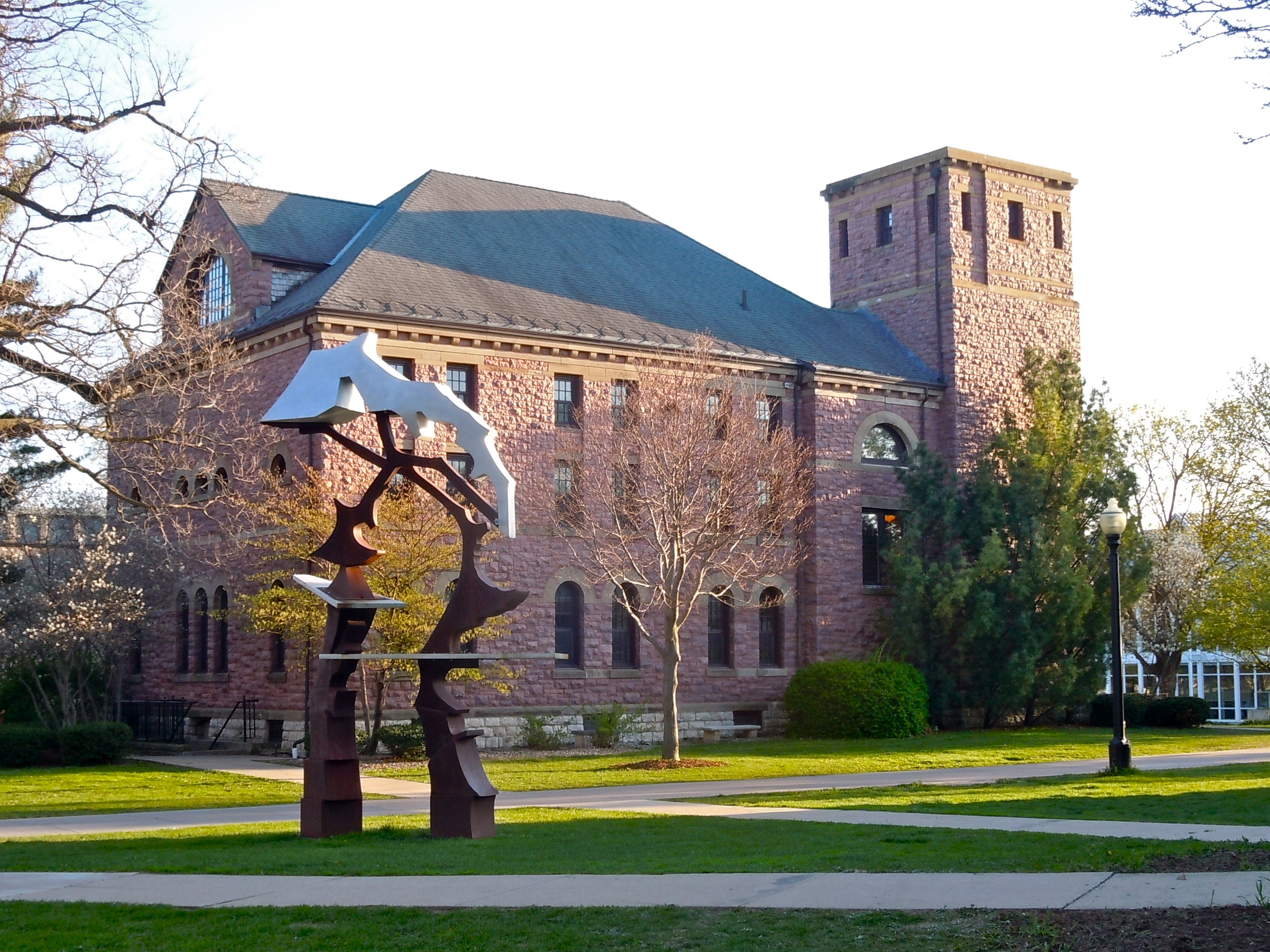

- Location within Iowa Location within the United States
- Location: Grinnell College campus
- Coordinates: 41°44′49″N 92°43′19″W
- Area: less than one acre
- Built: 1884
- Architect: Stephen C. Earle
- Architectural style: Richardsonian Romanesque
- NRHP reference No.: 79000934
- Added to NRHP: April 26, 1979

Goodnow Hall is a historic structure located on the Grinnell College campus in Grinnell, Iowa, United States. A tornado struck the college's campus in 1882, and this was one of four buildings that replaced the destroyed buildings. It is now the oldest building on campus. The other three are no longer extant. The building is named for Edward A. Goodnow, who was a well-known abolitionist and reformer who promoted public education for women. He donated $10,000 to the college to construct this building, which was the library until 1905. It was converted into office space and classrooms after that time. It was renovated again in 1995, and it housed the Department of Anthropology and later the Department of Gender, Women's, and Sexuality Studies. The three-story building was designed by Worcester, Massachusetts architect Stephen C. Earle in the Richardsonian Romanesque style. It features a tower on the northwest corner of the structure that was originally capped by a domed astronomical observatory. The exterior is composed of rusticated Sioux Falls granite (a.k.a. Sioux Quartzite). The building was listed on the National Register of Historic Places in 1979.
