= D. Wheeler Swift House =

Historic house in Massachusetts, United States

- U.S. National Register of Historic Places
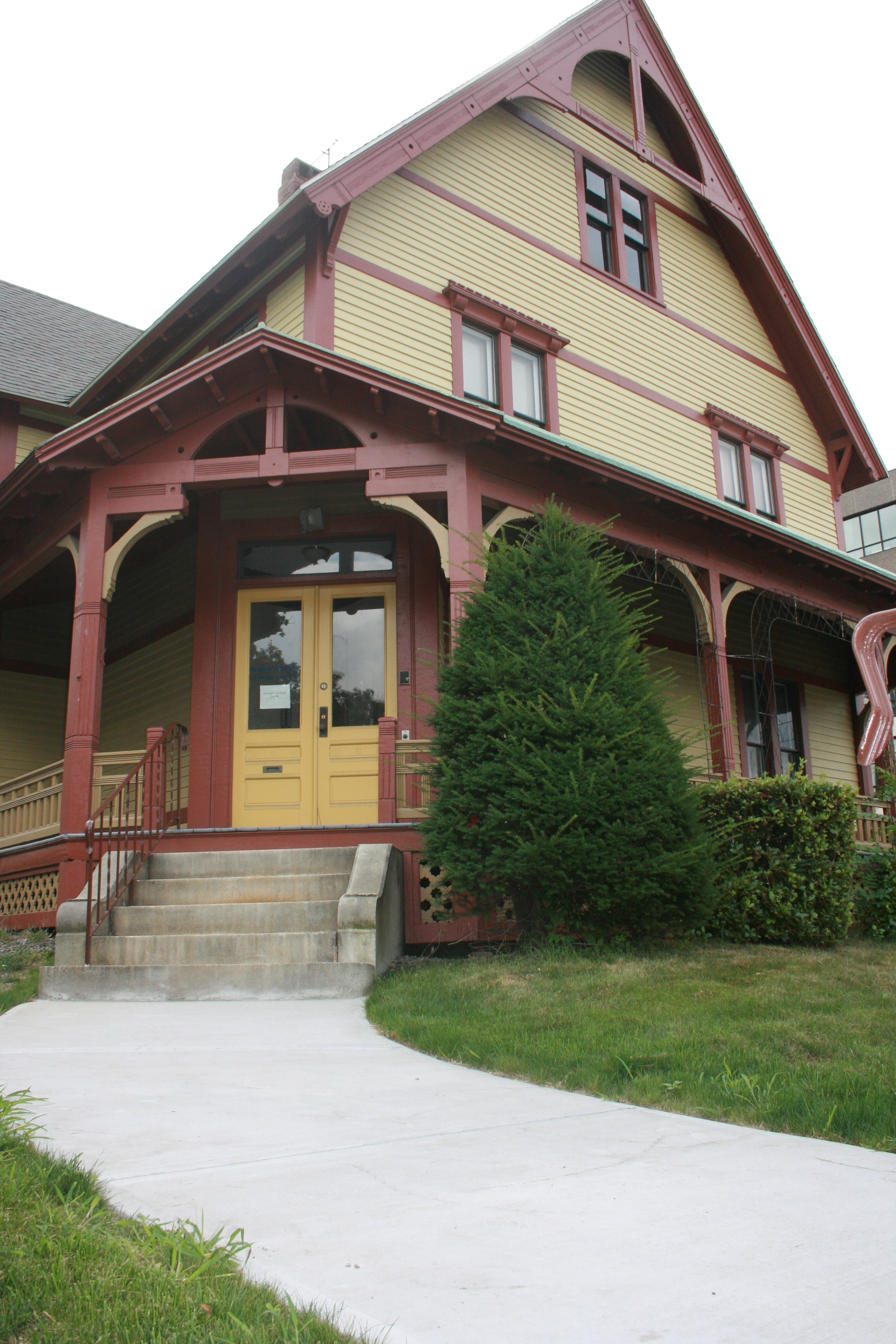

- Location within Massachusetts Location within the United States
- Location: 22 Oak Ave., Worcester, Massachusetts
- Coordinates: 42°16′23″N 71°47′37″W
- Area: 0.2 acres (0.081 ha)
- Built: 1879
- Architect: Stephen Earle
- Architectural style: Gothic
- MPS: Worcester MRA
- NRHP reference No.: 80000559
- Added to NRHP: March 5, 1980

The D. Wheeler Swift House is a historic house at 22 Oak Avenue in Worcester, Massachusetts. Built in 1879–80 to a design by the noted local architect Stephen C. Earle, it is a well-preserved example of Gothic Revival and Stick style design, which was home to a prominent business owner. The house was listed on the National Register of Historic Places in 1980.

== Description and history ==
The Swift House is located at the southeast corner of Oak and Kendall Streets in eastern Worcester, and is surrounded to the north, east, and south by buildings of the UMass Medical Center. It is a 2 1/2-story wood-frame structure, with a front-facing gable roof, clapboard siding, and granite foundation. A rectangular section with gable top projects to the left (Kendall Street) side. It is a well-preserved example of Gothic Revival and Stick style design, with bargeboard and decorative apron in the main gable. The porch, which wraps around two sides of the house, has a low geometric railing, and bracketing that echoes the woodwork in the gables. In an unusual touch, the main entrance is set at an angle at the corner.

The house was designed by architect Stephen C. Earle, a noted Worcester-based architect, and built in 1879–80. D. Wheeler Swift, a native of Falmouth, Massachusetts, was an inventor of envelope-making machines, eventually becoming an owner of companies that used such machines. By the end of the 19th century he was a director of the United States Envelope Company, formed by merging his company with several others.

== See also ==
- National Register of Historic Places listings in eastern Worcester, Massachusetts
