= St. Mark's Episcopal Church (Worcester, Massachusetts) =

Historic church in Massachusetts, United States

- St. Marks
- U.S. National Register of Historic Places
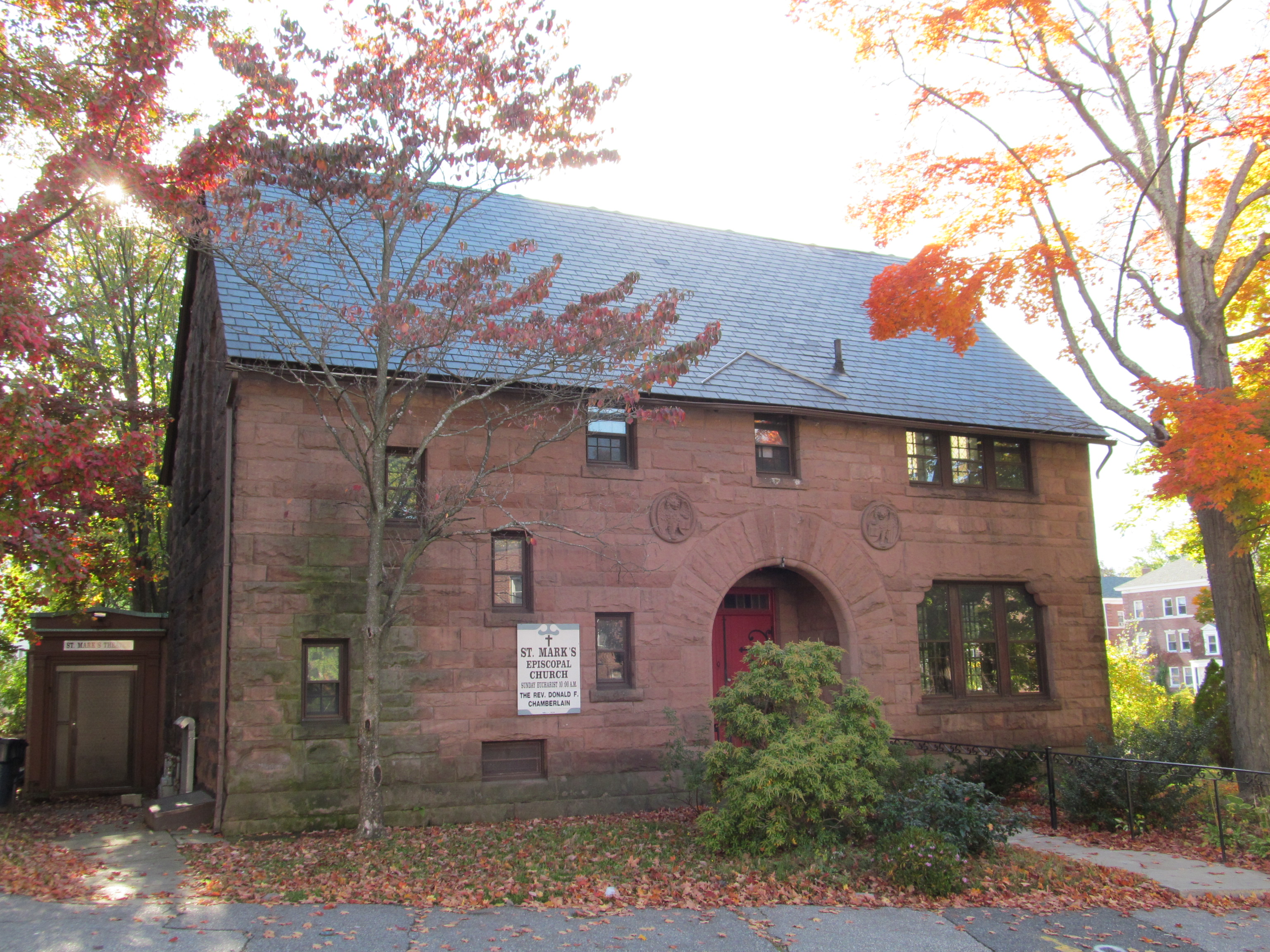
- St Mark's Episcopal Church

- Location within Massachusetts Location within the United States
- Location: 00 Freeland St., Worcester, Massachusetts
- Coordinates: 42°14′52″N 71°49′34″W
- Area: less than one acre
- Built: 1888
- Architect: Stephen C. Earle
- Architectural style: Romanesque
- MPS: Worcester MRA
- NRHP reference No.: 80000481
- Added to NRHP: March 5, 1980

St. Mark's Episcopal Church is an historic Episcopal church building at Zero Freeland Street in Worcester, Massachusetts. The Romanesque Revival stone building was designed by local architect Stephen C. Earle, and built in 1888 for a congregation established the preceding year. On March 5, 1980, the church building was added to the National Register of Historic Places as St. Marks. The current priest is the Rev. Robert Carroll Walters.

The church reported 31 members in 2022 and 79 members in 2023; no membership statistics were reported in 2024 parochial reports. Plate and pledge income reported for the congregation in 2024 was $29,375 with average Sunday attendance (ASA) of 59 persons.

== Architecture and history ==
St. Mark's is located in southwestern Worcester, on the west side of Freeland Street, just south of Main Street and southwest of Clark University. It is a two-story masonry structure, built of broken-coursed rusticated sandstone. It presents a side-gable roof to the street, with the main entrance recessed at the center under a large round-arch opening. Its principal decorative elements are panels with round medallions on either side of the arch over the recessed entrance, and the irregular placement of the windows. The front of the building houses the parish house, while the sanctuary is located in a cross-gabled extension to the rear.

The parish of St. Mark's was established as a mission in 1886 by Rev. William Huntington of All Saints Episcopal Church, the city's first Episcopal congregation, and held its first services in 1887 in a nearby Baptist church, while this building was under construction. It was completed in 1888 to a design by local architect Stephen C. Earle. Prominent early congregants included James and Orlando Norcross, principals of the Norcross Brothers construction firm.

== See also ==
- National Register of Historic Places listings in southwestern Worcester, Massachusetts
- National Register of Historic Places listings in Worcester County, Massachusetts
