= Pilgrim Congregational Church (Boston) =

Historic church in Massachusetts, United States

- U.S. National Register of Historic Places
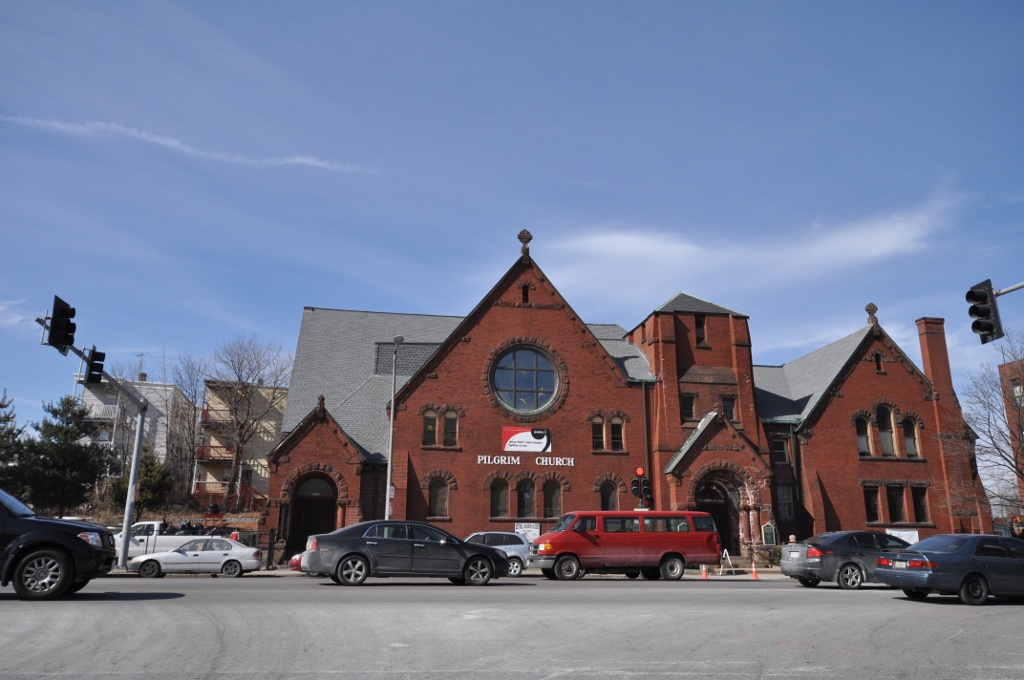

- Location within Massachusetts Location within the United States
- Location: 540-544 Columbia Road, Dorchester, Boston, Massachusetts
- Coordinates: 42°18′58″N 71°4′1″W
- Area: less than one acre
- Built: 1884
- Architect: Stephen C. Earle
- Architectural style: Romanesque Revival
- NRHP reference No.: 13000929
- Added to NRHP: December 18, 2013

Pilgrim Congregational Church is a historic church building at 540-544 Columbia Road in the Dorchester neighborhood of Boston, Massachusetts. The brick Romanesque Revival building was built 1890–1893 to a design by Worcester architect Stephen C. Earle. The congregation for which it was built was established in 1862; this was its second purpose-built church. The congregation was divided when the Romsey Congregational Church was established in 1893 to serve congregants living closer to Savin Hill; the two congregations were reunited in 1930, and stained glass windows from the Romsey Church were installed in this building.

The Pilgrim Church was subjected to a severely damaging fire in October 1970. Although it was restricted to the sanctuary, there was extensive water and smoke damage, and five stained glass windows (including the three from the Romsey Church) were destroyed. The congregation decided to rebuild the main sanctuary as a multipurpose fellowship hall and now worships in the chapel.

The church was listed on the National Register of Historic Places in 2013.

== See also ==
- National Register of Historic Places listings in southern Boston, Massachusetts
