= Salisbury Factory Building =

- U.S. National Register of Historic Places
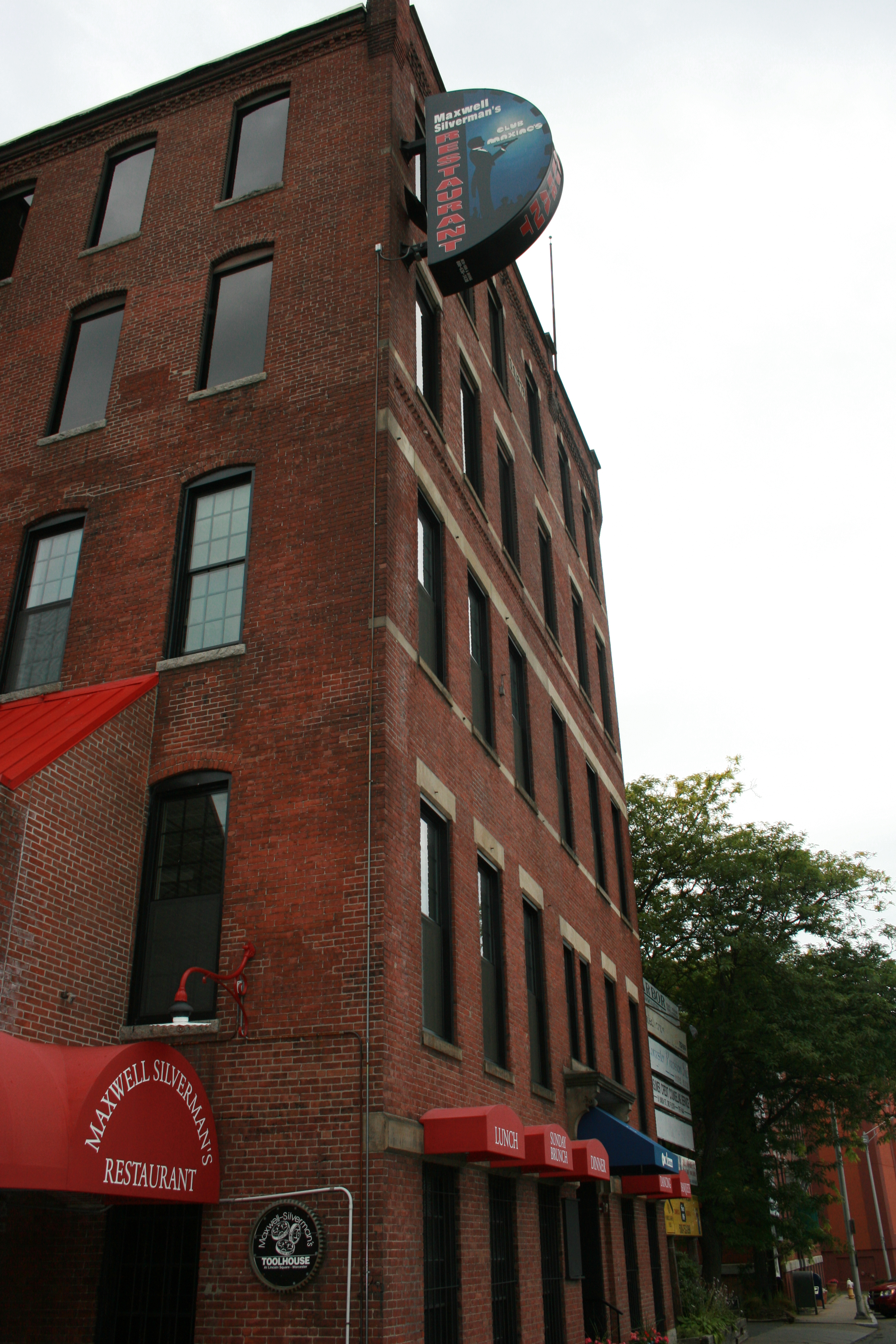

- Location within Massachusetts Location within the United States
- Interactive map of Salisbury Factory Building
- Location: 25 Union St., Worcester, Massachusetts
- Coordinates: 42°16′12″N 71°47′55″W
- Built: 1879
- MPS: Worcester MRA
- NRHP reference No.: 80000587
- Added to NRHP: March 05, 1980

- Salisbury Factory Building
- U.S. National Register of Historic Places
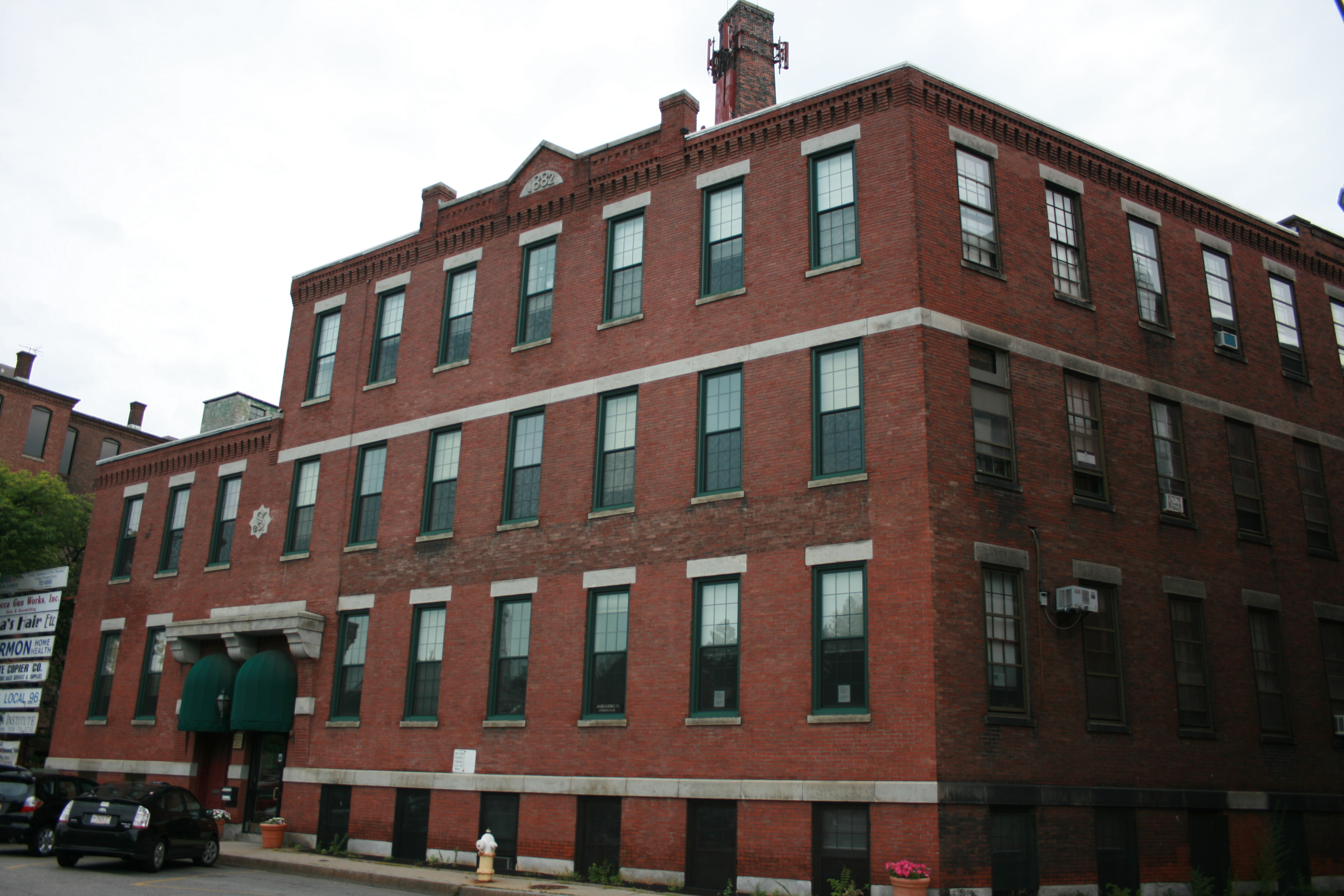

- Location within Massachusetts Location within the United States
- Location: 49-51 Union St., Worcester, Massachusetts
- Built: 1882
- MPS: Worcester MRA
- NRHP reference No.: 80000588
- Added to NRHP: March 05, 1980

There are two historic Salisbury Factory Buildings in Worcester, Massachusetts. The first of these, at 25 Union Street, was built in 1879, and is a five-story brick building with modest Victorian Gothic trim. The second, at 49-51 Union Street, was built in 1882, is a three-story brick building designed by local architect Stephen Earle. These two buildings are the only ones that survive of a series of factory buildings built by Stephen Salisbury II and Stephen Salisbury III in the Lincoln Square area north of Worcester's downtown. The Salisburys rented space out to small manufacturers in these buildings, introducing a trend that dominated the industrial development of the city. Most of their buildings were demolished during redevelopment of the area in the 20th century.

Both buildings were listed on the National Register of Historic Places in 1980.

== See also ==
- National Register of Historic Places listings in northwestern Worcester, Massachusetts
- National Register of Historic Places listings in Worcester County, Massachusetts
