= Pilgrim Congregational Church (Worcester, Massachusetts) =

Historic church in Massachusetts, United States

- U.S. National Register of Historic Places
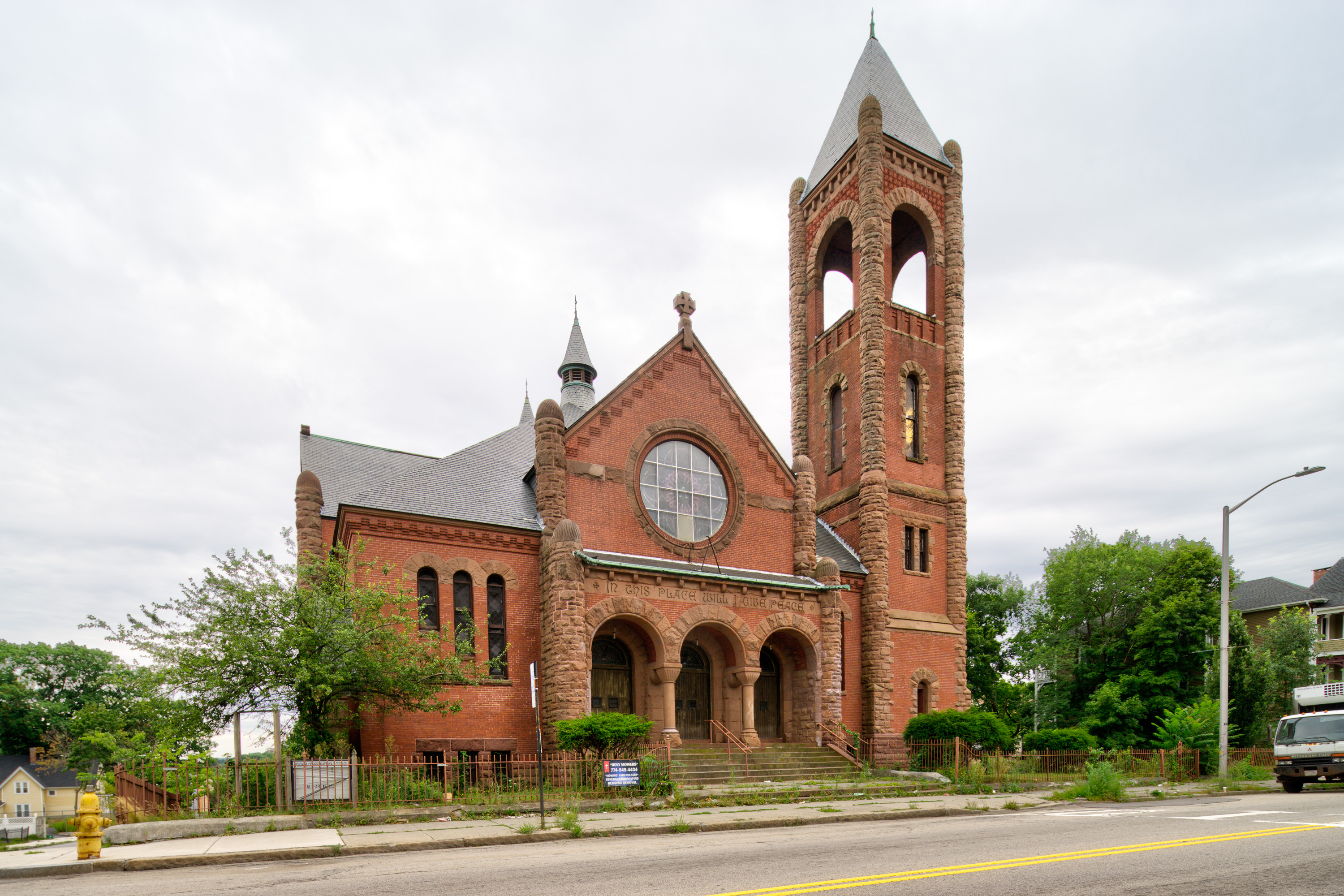

- Location within Massachusetts Location within the United States
- Location: Worcester, Massachusetts
- Coordinates: 42°15′7″N 71°49′8″W
- Built: 1887
- Architect: Stephen C. Earle
- Architectural style: Romanesque
- MPS: Worcester MRA
- NRHP reference No.: 80000551
- Added to NRHP: March 05, 1980

Pilgrim Congregational Church is a historic Congregational church building at 909 Main Street in Worcester, Massachusetts. The brick Romanesque Revival building was constructed in 1887 to a design by local architect Stephen Earle. The buildings windows and other details are trimmed in sandstone, and a tower with projecting rounded corners rises from one corner. It features an open belfry with round-arch openings and is capped by a steeply pitched roof, with decorative finials at the corners.

The church was listed on the National Register of Historic Places in 1980.

== See also ==
- National Register of Historic Places listings in southwestern Worcester, Massachusetts
- National Register of Historic Places listings in Worcester County, Massachusetts
