= Union Congregational Church (Worcester, Massachusetts) =

Historic church in Massachusetts, United States

- U.S. National Register of Historic Places
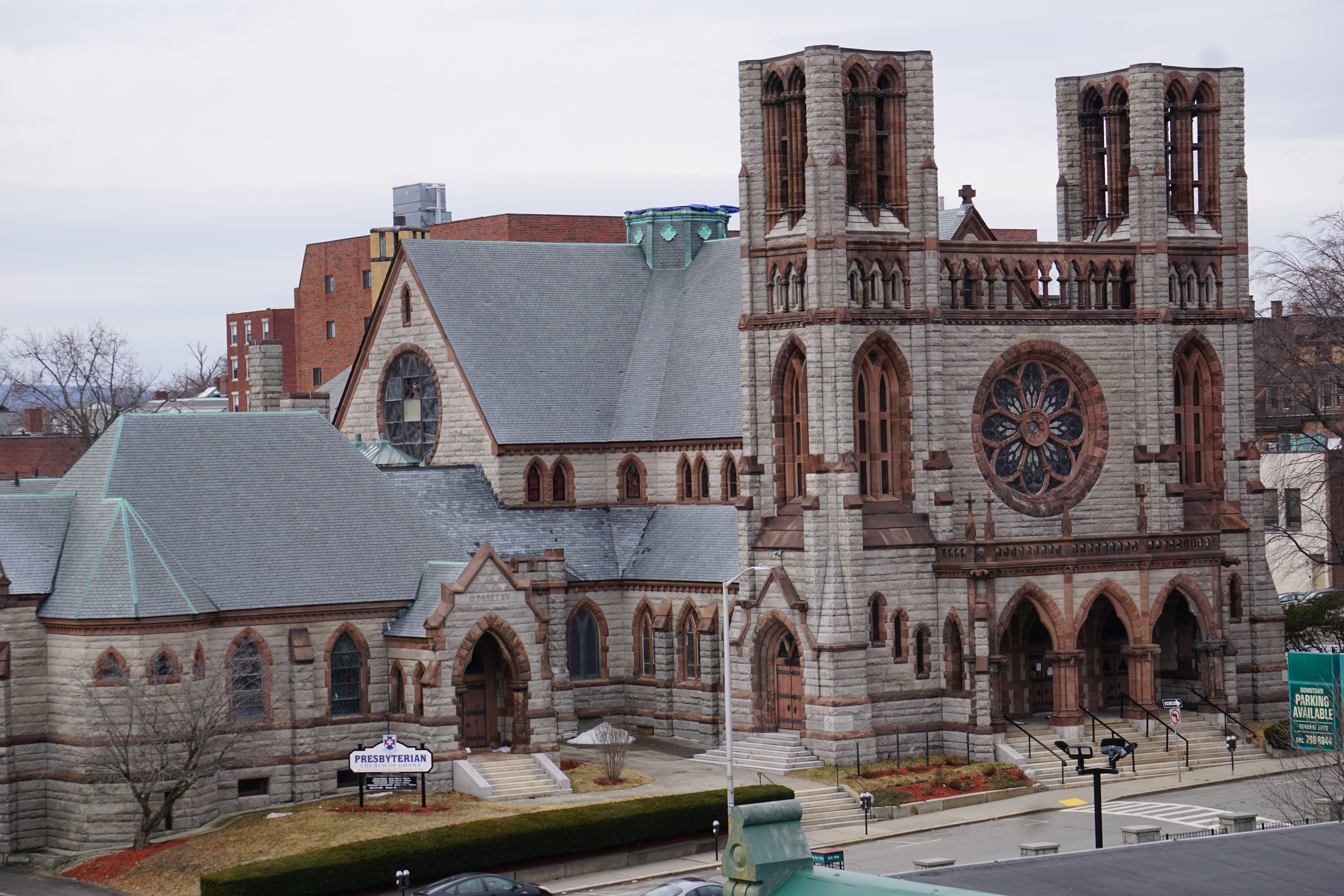
- Union Congregational Church

- Location within Massachusetts Location within the United States
- Location: 5 Chestnut St., Worcester, Massachusetts
- Coordinates: 42°15′51″N 71°48′19″W
- Built: 1895
- Architect: Stephen Earle & C. Fisher
- Architectural style: Gothic Revival
- MPS: Worcester MRA
- NRHP reference No.: 80000599
- Added to NRHP: March 5, 1980

The Union Congregational Church or Chestnut Street Congregational Church is a historic Congregational church building at 5 Chestnut Street in Worcester, Massachusetts. The church is a well-preserved local example of Victorian Gothic Revival styling. Its basic appearance is reminiscent of the Notre Dame de Paris, although on a more modest scale. The building was designed by Earle & Fisher and construction took place between 1895 and 1897. Its main facade features twin towers flanking an entrance consisting of three trefoil arches, above which is a large rose window and an arched arcade connecting the two towers. The upper levels of the towers are open areas surrounded by paired narrow pointed-arch openings, and are decorated by crenellations and gargoyles. The main body of the church is covered in a slate roof (original replaced in 1948), and the stained glass of some of its windows was brought over from the buildings of other church congregations which merged into the Union congregation.

The building was listed on the National Register of Historic Places in 1980.

== See also ==
- National Register of Historic Places listings in northwestern Worcester, Massachusetts
- National Register of Historic Places listings in Worcester County, Massachusetts
