= Providence Street Firehouse =

- U.S. National Register of Historic Places
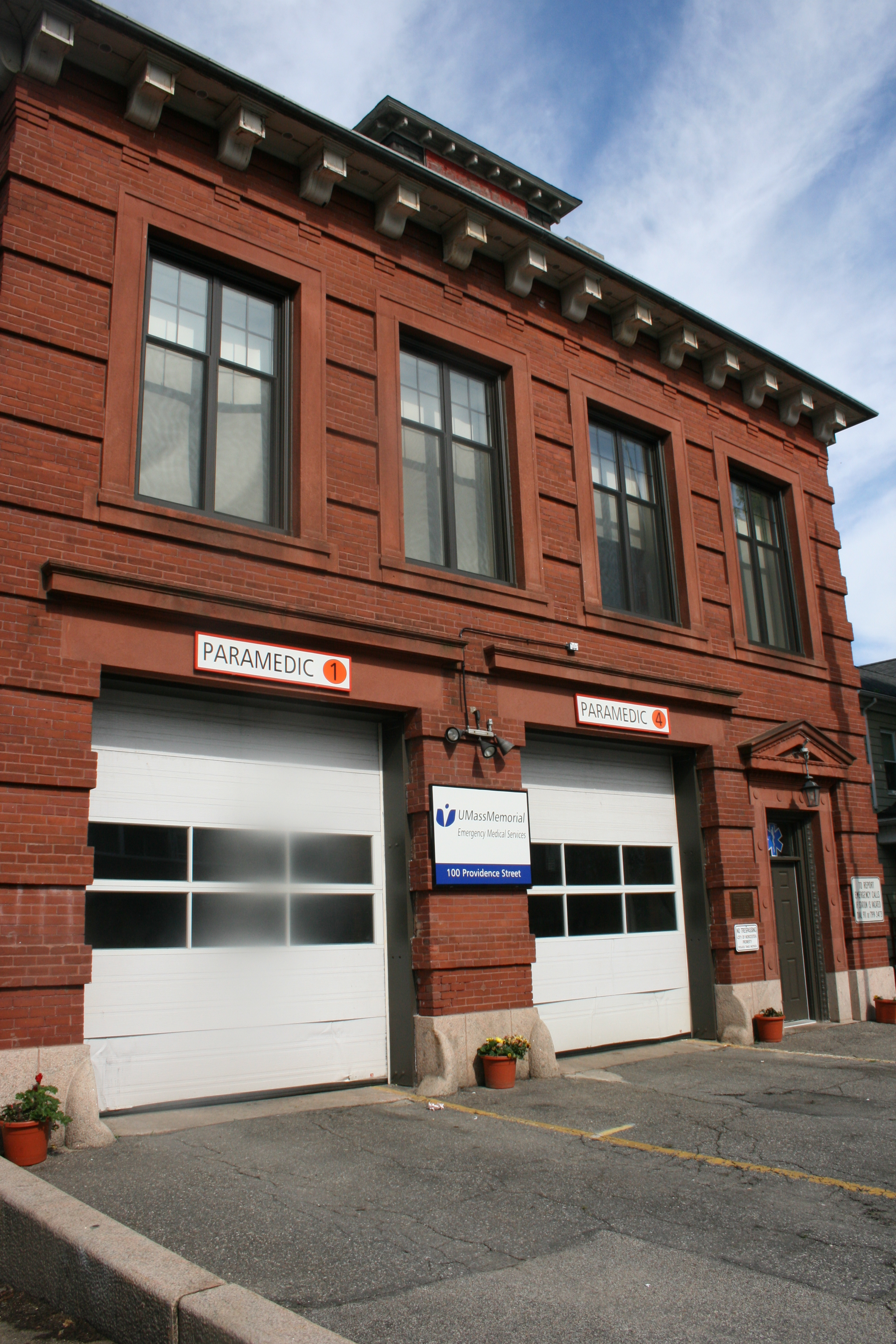
- Providence Street Firehouse building in 2011

- Location within Massachusetts Location within the United States
- Location: 98 Providence St., Worcester, Massachusetts
- Coordinates: 42°15′4″N 71°47′36″W
- Area: 0.1 acres (0.040 ha)
- Built: 1899
- Architect: Earle & Fisher
- Architectural style: Classical Revival
- MPS: Worcester MRA
- NRHP reference No.: 80000553
- Added to NRHP: March 5, 1980

The Providence Street Firehouse is a historic former firestation at 98 Providence Street in Worcester, Massachusetts. Built in 1899, it is unusual among the city's firehouses for its Beaux Arts stylings. The building, listed on the National Register of Historic Places in 1980, now houses Worcester Emergency Medical Services (WEMS).

== Description and history ==
The former Providence Street firehouse stands on the west side of Providence Street, in a predominantly residential area southeast of the city's downtown. It is a 2-1/2 story brick building, rectangular in plan, with a hip roof and a square tower on the north side. The tower is topped by a pyramidal roof. It has two garage bays set in rectangular openings, topped by sandstone lintels, with a pedestrian entrance to their right. That entrance has a Beaux Arts style surround, with rosettes decorating the trim elements, and a gabled pediment above. The second floor has four paired sash windows set in rectangular openings. The roof eave is studded with heavy brackets.

The building was designed by Earle & Fisher and was built in 1899 to serve what was then a rapidly developing neighborhood. Although similar in size and scale to other period firestations in the city, this one is distinctive for its heavy Beaux Arts decoration.

The building was listed on the National Register of Historic Places in 1980. Engine 12 and Ladder 5 ran out of this station until 2009. Worcester Emergency Medical Services took over the station, providing space for Paramedic 1 and Paramedic 4, and for a training facility.

== See also ==
- National Register of Historic Places listings in eastern Worcester, Massachusetts
