= Medway Village Historic District =

Historic district in Massachusetts, United States

- U.S. National Register of Historic Places
- U.S. Historic district
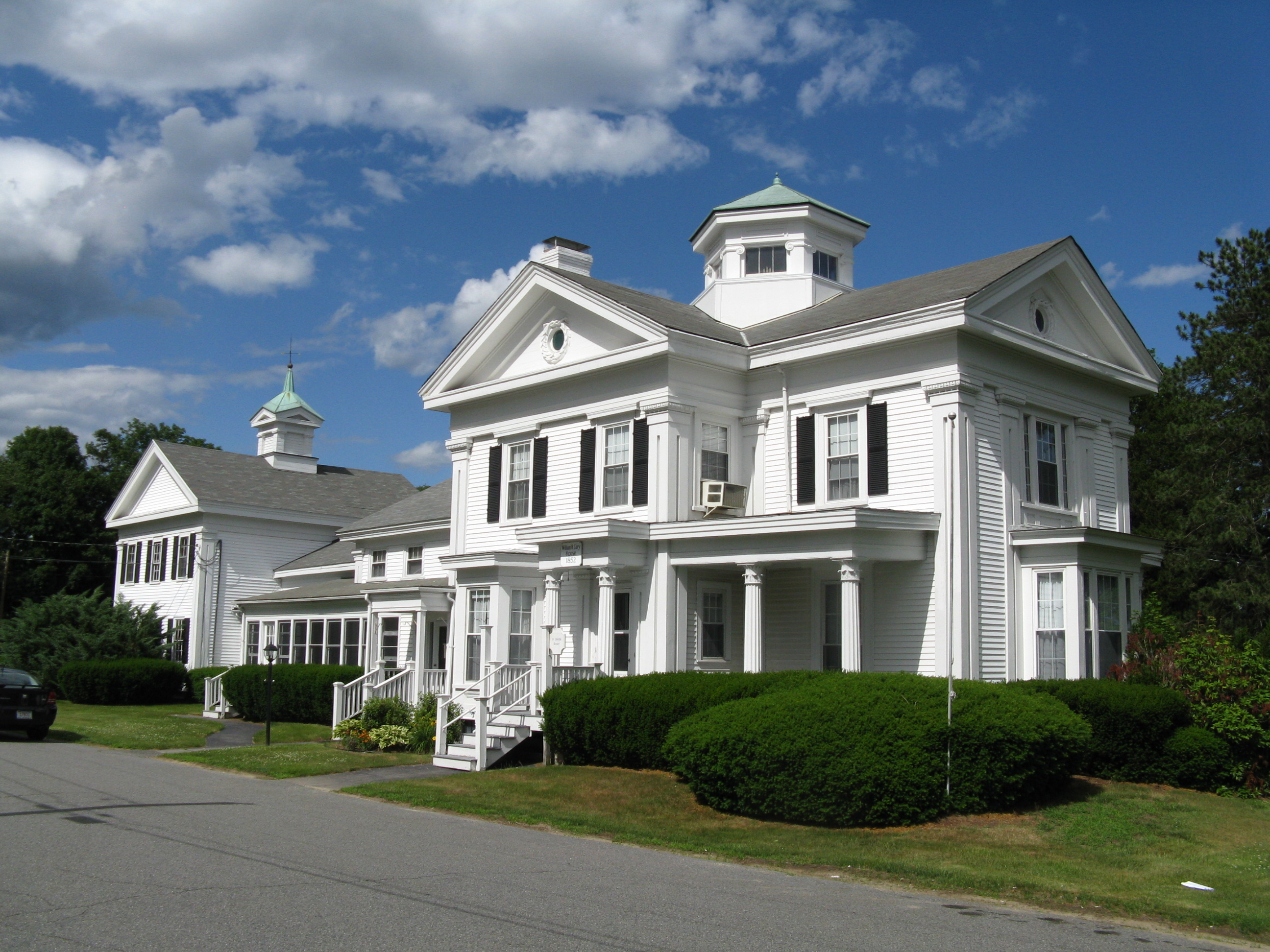
- William H. Cary House

- Location within Massachusetts Location within the United States
- Location: Bounded by former New York and Boston railroad right of way, Oakland St., and Charles River, Medway, Massachusetts
- Coordinates: 42°08′30″N 71°23′48″W
- Area: 60 acres (24 ha)
- Architect: Earle, Stephen C.; et al.
- Architectural style: Georgian, Federal
- NRHP reference No.: 08001191
- Added to NRHP: December 17, 2008

The Medway Village Historic District encompasses a historic 19th century industrial village in southeastern Medway, Massachusetts. The village grew as a consequence of the textile industry that developed on the Charles River in the area beginning in the later years of the 18th century, and running through most of the 19th century. The district is an area covering 60 acres (24 ha) that includes more than 240 historically significant structures, most of which were built between 1831 and 1897.

The district was listed on the National Register of Historic Places in 2008.

== Transportation ==
Medway station was a former railroad station located in Medway Village. The station opened in 1861 and closed in 1966, when train service on the MBTA Millis Branch was discontinued west of Millis station. Train service through Medway was suspended from July 1938 to March 1940.

The main road through the neighborhood, Village Street, runs east to west through Medway and Millis. Originally named Old Mendon Road, it is the oldest road in Medway, being laid out in 1670.

== See also ==
- National Register of Historic Places listings in Norfolk County, Massachusetts
