= Whitcomb Mansion =

Historic house in Massachusetts, United States

- U.S. National Register of Historic Places
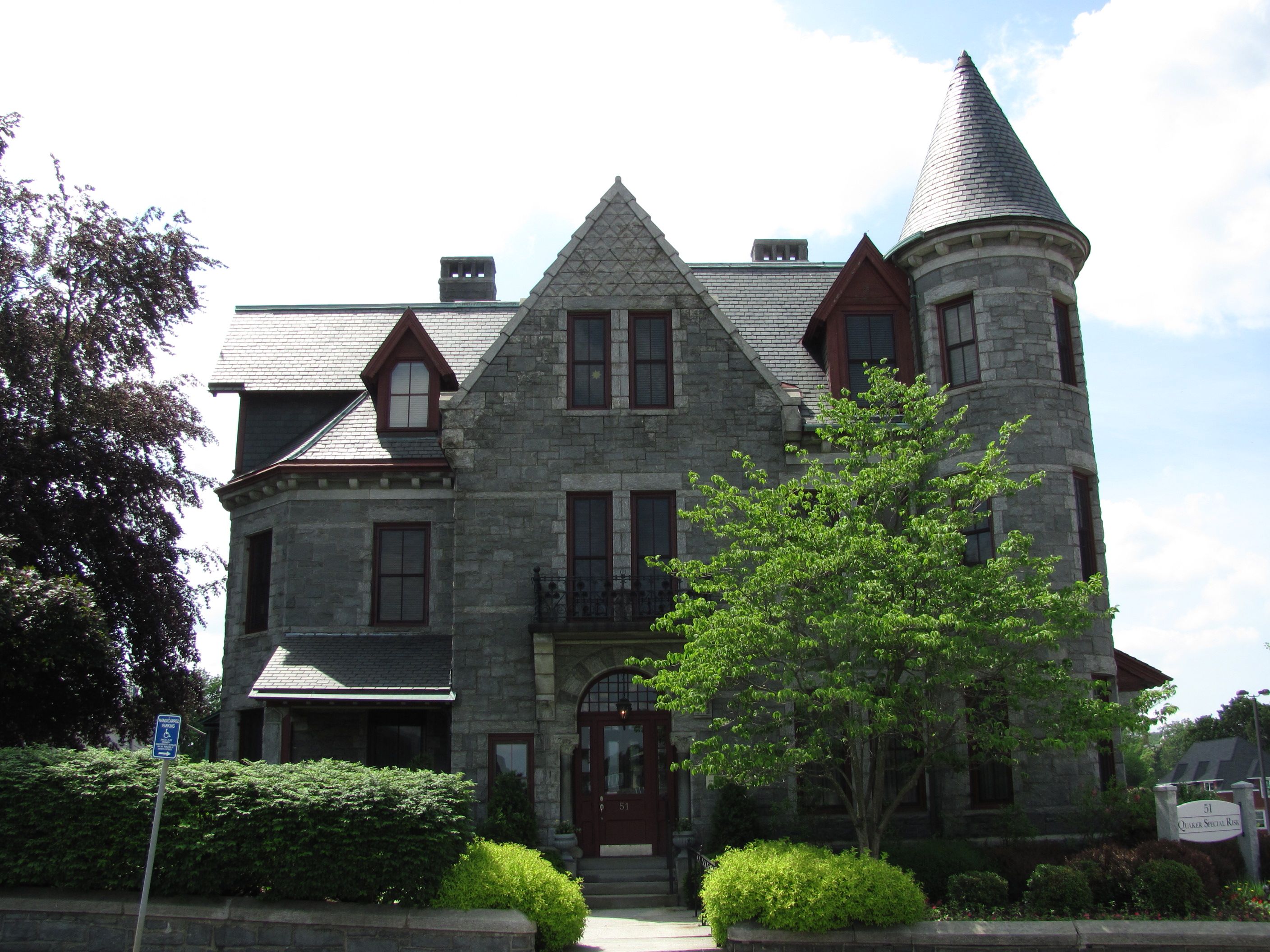
- Whitcomb Mansion

- Location within Massachusetts Location within the United States
- Location: 51 Harvard St., Worcester, Massachusetts
- Coordinates: 42°16′16″N 71°48′9″W
- Built: 1879
- Architect: Earle, Stephen C.
- Architectural style: Queen Anne
- MPS: Individual; Worcester MRA
- NRHP reference No.: 77000653 (Individual); 80000499 (Worcester MRA)
- Added to NRHP: March 5, 1980

The Whitcomb Mansion (also Whitcomb House) is a historic house at 51 Harvard Street in Worcester, Massachusetts. It is a high Victorian (Queen Anne style) mansion that was built in 1879 as the home of George H. Whitcomb, one of the city's leading businessmen and philanthropists. It is also one of the few surviving houses designed by noted Worcester architect Stephen Earle.

George Whitcomb, a Templeton, Massachusetts native, made a fortune in the business of manufacturing envelopes. In addition to this business, he also dealt in real estate in Worcester and elsewhere. He was active in a number of charitable causes, notably educational causes across the country. After his death in 1918, his house was given to the Society for the Blind.

The house Earle designed for Whitcomb is an asymmetrical polychromatic three story granite structure measuring 40 feet (12 m) by 70 feet (21 m). Its front facade is divided into three sections, the central one a projecting gable-ended entry. The front door is flanked by sidelights and is topped by a half-round window, all slightly recessed in an archway. Above the door on the second level of the entry section are a pair of windows, in front of which is a decoratively embellished cast iron balcony. The gable also contains a pair of windows, above which the point of the gable is filled with lighter-colored triangular granite stones. The left section of the main facade is two stories, but the roof is pierced by a single steeply pitched gable dormer. The right section also has a gable dormer, but is truncated because of the presence of a round tower, which is a full three stories high and is topped by a conical roof. Behind the house stands a carriage house, a single story structure built of local stone, topped by a steep slate roof and cupola.

The interior of the house has retained some of its original details despite alterations made to accommodate the Society for the Blind's use of the building. The downstairs rooms are decorated in a variety of exotic wood finishes, and the walls and ceilings are covered in decorative paintings. The upstairs rooms are finished in cherry, ash, and maple.

The house was listed twice on the National Register of Historic Places: as an individual listing in 1977 (as Whitcomb House) and as part of a multiple resources listing in 1980 (as Whitcomb Mansion).

== See also ==
- National Register of Historic Places listings in northwestern Worcester, Massachusetts
- National Register of Historic Places listings in Worcester County, Massachusetts
