= YWCA of Central Massachusetts =

- YWCA of Worcester
- U.S. National Register of Historic Places
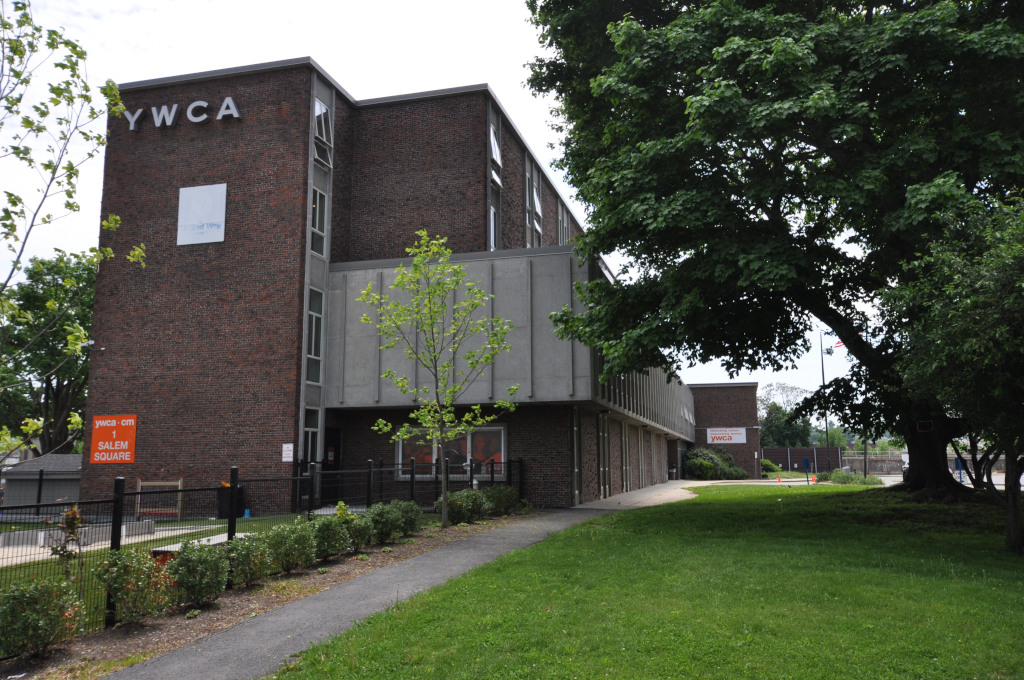

- Location within Massachusetts Location within the United States
- Location: 2 YWCA Way, Worcester, Massachusetts
- Coordinates: 42°15′36″N 71°47′59″W
- Area: 2.69 acres (1.09 ha)
- Built: 1962
- Architect: Kilham, Hopkins, Greeley & Brodie
- Architectural style: International Style
- NRHP reference No.: 100007389
- Added to NRHP: February 3, 2022

- Worcester Young Women's Christian Association
- U.S. National Register of Historic Places
- Location within Massachusetts Location within the United States
- Location: 6 Chatham St., Worcester, Massachusetts
- Coordinates: 42°15′43″N 71°48′14″W
- Area: 0.36 acres (0.15 ha)
- Built: 1892
- Architect: Stephen C. Earle; George H. Clemence;
- Architectural style: Richardsonian Romanesque; Classical Revival
- NRHP reference No.: 100009287
- Added to NRHP: August 22, 2023

The Young Women's Christian Association (YWCA) of Worcester, now the YWCA of Central Massachusetts, was founded in 1885 in Worcester, Massachusetts. The nonprofit organization, like many other YWCA chapters, provides a wide variety of tailored services to women and children in its service area. Included are health and fitness services, transitional housing for single women and mothers with children, job training programs, and racial equity programs for women of color. The YWCA is headquartered at 2 YWCA in downtown Worcester, in a facility listed on the National Register of Historic Places.

== History ==
The Worcester YWCA was founded in 1885 by fourteen women "to promote the temporal, moral and religious welfare of young women who are dependent on their own exertions for support." Initially operating classes out of leased commercial space, it soon acquired a property on Chatham Street where it established a boarding house in 1892. It acquired a campground in Princeton a few years afterward. Its services and offerings continued to expand over the years, and in 1960 it moved to its present facility just southwest of downtown Worcester. The Chatham Street campus, expanded to three buildings in the 1910s and 1920s, was sold to the adjacent department store, and in 2021 completed conversion to a mixed-use commercial/residential property. It was listed on the National Register of Historic Places in 2023.

== Facilities ==
The current YWCA campus is located on under 3 acres (1.2 ha) southwest of Worcester's city hall. The area it stands in was the subject of an urban renewal project begun in the late 1950s, and was completed in 1962. It was designed by Kilham, Hopkins, Greeley & Brodie of Boston, and is a prominent local example of the International style of architecture, with its relatively unadorned exterior of brick, concrete, and glass, and organization of rectangular masses. This campus was also listed on the National Register in 2022, for its architecture and social history.

== See also ==
- National Register of Historic Places listings in northwestern Worcester, Massachusetts
