= North Congregational Church =

- Grace Baptist Church; Hispanic Baptist Church
- Iglesia Apostolica Renovacion Springfield
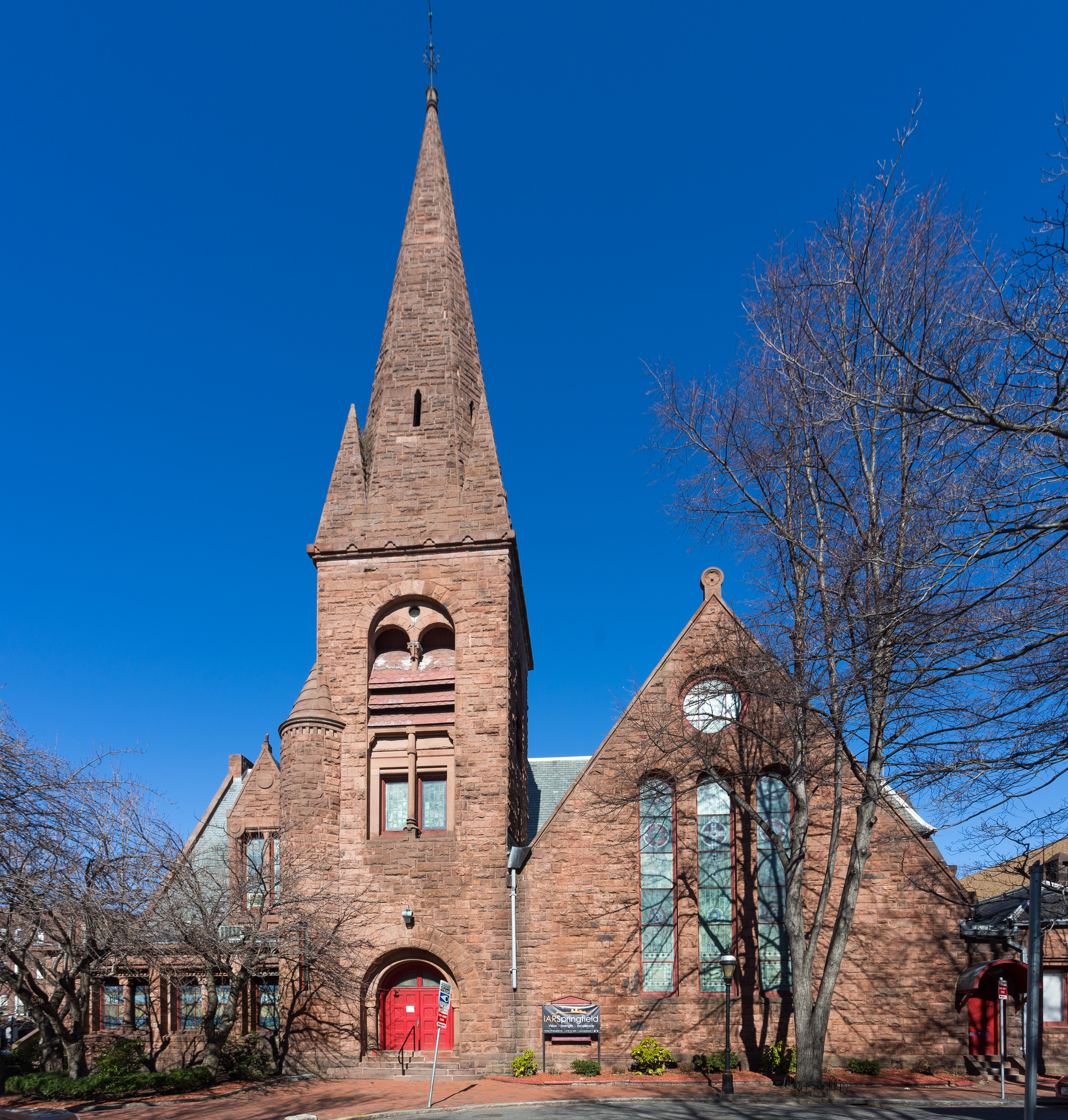

- Location within Massachusetts
- 42°6′22.63″N 72°35′11.35″W
- Location: Springfield, Massachusetts
- Country: United States
- Denomination: Apostolic
- Previous denomination: Congregational
- Website: www.iar.church

History
- Former name: North Congregational Church

Architecture
- Architect: Henry Hobson Richardson
- Architectural type: Romanesque
- Years built: 1872-1873

Clergy
- Pastor: Reverend Dr. Pedro Rafael Osorio

North Congregational Church was built in Springfield, Massachusetts in 1872-73, and was one of the early works by noted American architect Henry Hobson Richardson. It is one of his first works in the Romanesque style.

== Building ==
The structure is of light sandstone and does not show the more distinctive features of later Richardsonian Romanesque works by Richardson and others. While the exterior is rectangular, the interior is cruciform with the corners filled by functional spaces i.e. the vestibule and church offices.

The church is located at 18 Salem Street, at the corner of Salem and Mattoon Streets.

== History ==
The North Congregational Society disbanded in 1935 and the church was sold and renamed Grace Baptist Church. It was later renamed Hispanic Baptist Church.

By 2016, the church was operating as IAR (Iglesia Apostolica Renovacion) Springfield, part of the Apostolic Renewal Renovation Network, a network of 27 churches in 6 countries. It was a bilingual Apostolic congregation with Hispanic, African-American and Anglo-Saxon members, and a regular attendance of 500 people.

In 2019, the church was put up for sale and there is no congregation using it.
