= Apostolic Faith Mission (Brooklyn) =

Church in New York City

Coordinates: 40°41′18.4″N 73°57′56″W

The Former Orthodox Friends Meeting House
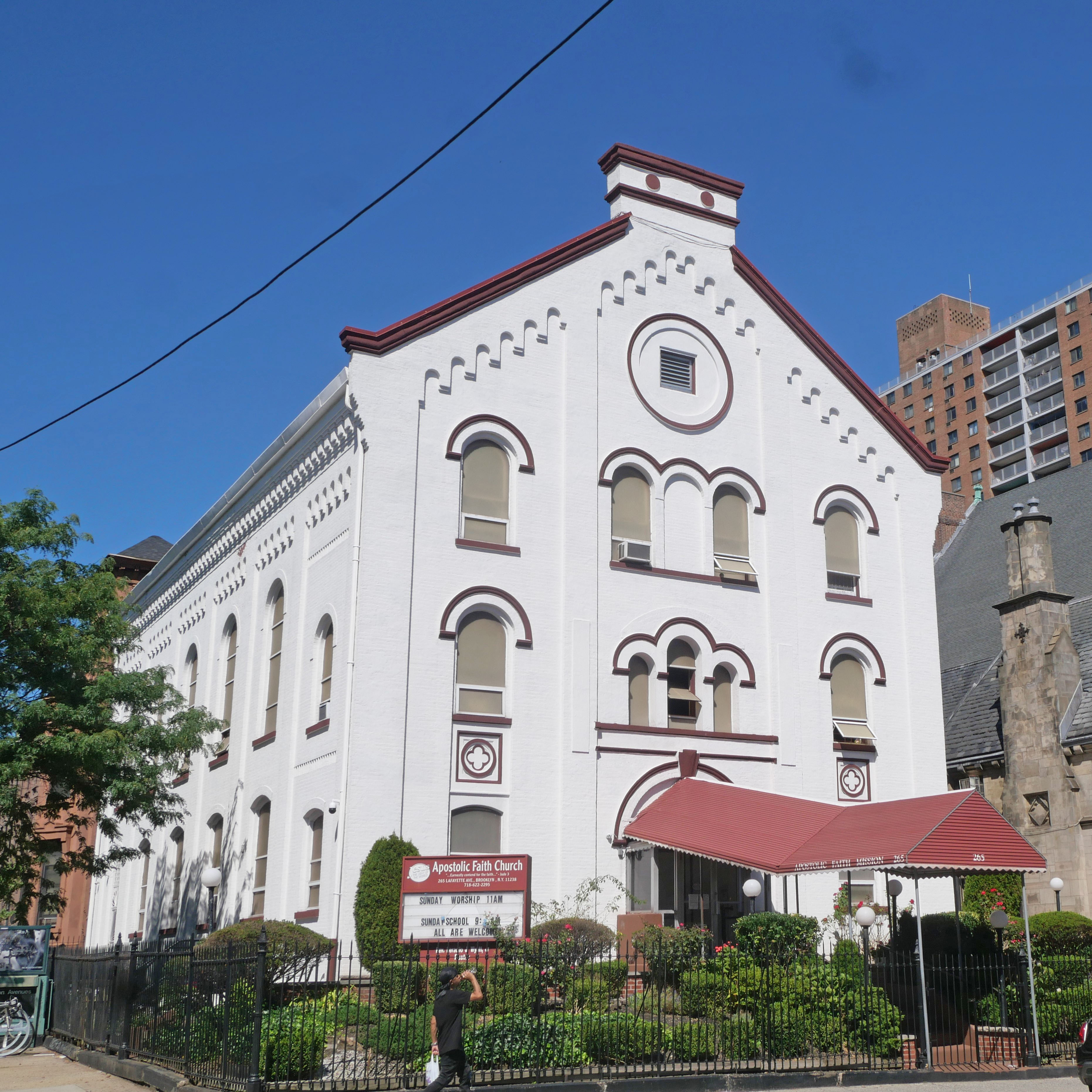

General information
- Architectural style: Lombardian Romanesque
- Location: Brooklyn, New York City, United States of America
- Completed: 1868
- Client: The Society of Friends

Technical details
- Structural system: Masonry

Website
- www.afcbrooklyn.org

The Apostolic Faith Mission church in Clinton Hill, Brooklyn, New York City, located at 265 Lafayette Avenue northeast corner of Washington Avenue, occupies the historic nineteenth-century former Orthodox Friends Meeting House.

The former Society of Friends (Quaker) meetinghouse was built 1868, described in the AIA Guide to New York City as "A simple Lombardian Romanesque box polychromed with vigor by its current tenants." As of 1977, it was the Apostolic Faith Mission.
