= Telegram & Gazette =

Newspaper in Worcester, Massachusetts

- The September 11, 2008, front page of the Telegram & Gazette
- Type: Daily newspaper
- Format: Broadsheet
- Owner: USA Today Co.
- Founded: January 1, 1866
- Headquarters: 100 Front Street; Worcester, Massachusetts 01608, United States
- Circulation: 8,698 Average print circulation 4,133 Digital Subscribers
- ISSN: 1050-4184
- Website: telegram.com

The Telegram & Gazette (and Sunday Telegram) is the sole daily newspaper of Worcester, Massachusetts. The paper, headquartered at 100 Front Street and known locally as the Telegram or the T & G, offers coverage of all of Worcester County, as well as surrounding areas of the western suburbs of Boston, Western Massachusetts, and several towns in Windham County in northeastern Connecticut.

== History ==
On January 22, 1913, the Worcester Telegram ran a story ("Thorpe with Professional Baseball Team Says Clancy"), soon picked up by other papers, that led to Jim Thorpe being stripped of his 1912 Olympic titles, medals and awards.

Until the 1980s, two papers—the Worcester Telegram in the morning and the Evening Gazette in the afternoon—were published by the same company, with separate editorial staffs in some departments. The two were merged into a single Telegram & Gazette upon their acquisition by Chronicle Publishing Company, publishers of the San Francisco Chronicle, in 1986. The Chronicle sold the Telegram & Gazette to The New York Times Company in 1999 for $300 million.

The paper's previous owners also owned Worcester radio station WTAG until selling it after the newspapers were divested, in 1987.

The Telegram & Gazette moved its headquarters from a building on Franklin Street to the Mercantile Center in 2012.

In October 2013, the Telegram & Gazette was bought from The New York Times Company by John W. Henry's Boston Globe Media Partners as part of his purchase of The Boston Globe. Only a month later, Henry announced his intention to sell the paper. From 2009 until March 2014, retired editor Harry Whitin and Ralph Crowley of Polar Beverages explored purchasing the paper. In May 2014, Boston Globe Media Partners sold the paper to Florida-based Halifax Media Group for $20 million, who immediately laid off 20 of the Telegram & Gazette's 80 newsroom staff members. Halifax sold it along with all of their publications to GateHouse Media in January 2015. In 2018, owner GateHouse Media acquired Holden Landmark Corporation, owner of the alternative weekly Worcester Magazine. Six positions at the Telegram & Gazette were cut in May 2019. Six more employees were laid off in August 2019, including the Telegram & Gazette's last long-standing columnist, as part of nationwide custs to GateHouse papers. In July 2019, Worcester Magazine began to be included as a weekly insert in the Telegram & Gazette to replace its arts and entertainment section. In late 2019, GateHouse purchased Gannett and assumed its name. In late 2020, Gannett laid off about 500 employees nationwide, including several longtime Telegram & Gazette reporters as part of cost-cutting measures. Some of these were replaced by new hires. Gannett has further gutted the Telegram & Gazette, as it customarily does to its holdings.

The Telegram & Gazette has been referred to as the newspaper of record in Central Massachusetts. It has also been described as a ghost newspaper, a publication that continues publishing but is a shell of its former self.

The Telegram & Gazette published over 2,400 articles in September 2011, and 506 in September 2023.

=== Circulation ===
- 1999: 107,400
- 2012: 74,563 (weekday)
- 2013: 74,000 (weekday) and 78,000 (Sunday)
- 2018: 22,400 (weekday)
- 2023: 12,831 (8,698 print and 4,133 paid electronic, weekday), 16,457 (12,403 print, 4,054 paid electronic, Sunday)

== Quality ==
A comparison of T & G reporting in 2019 vs. 2010 indicates a substantial increase in transcription journalism, while also affirming that the paper continues to practice accountability journalism. T & G based a quarter of its 2019 stories regarding a major construction project on press releases, in comparison to its coverage of a similar event in 2010 which did not use press releases for any articles.

== Sections and features ==
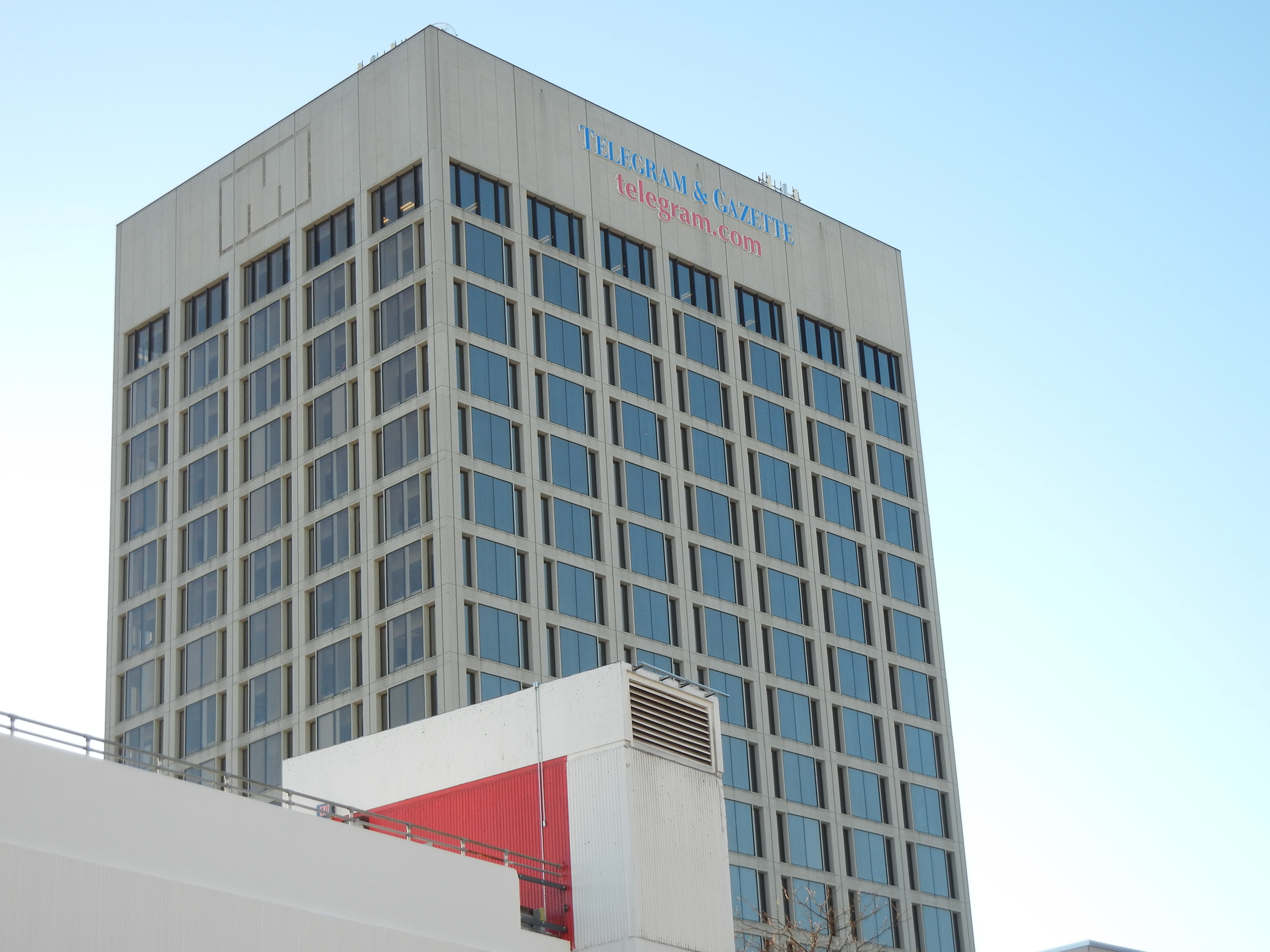
Headquarters at 100 Front Street

The weekday Telegram & Gazette contains national, state and local news, as well as sports, business, and a feature stories. On Thursdays Worcester Magazine is inserted in the paper highlighting local artists and events in the area.

The paper's regular reporters also contribute regular or occasional columns with names such as "Barnestorming", "City Hall Notebook", "Politics and the City", etc. The local news section also includes local news stories and obituaries.

All editorials and letters to the editor appear in the regional opinion and op-ed pages of the main news section.

The Sunday Telegram includes the county's largest classified ad listings, Business Matters section, News, Local and Editorial pages, Living and Homes, and Cars sections, a tabloid-sized comic section and an in-house created Arts, Culture and Travel Section, which replaced similar sections that used to be reprinted in full from The Boston Globe.

The Worcester Telegram & Gazette Corporation owns Coulter Press, which publishes several weekly newspapers in suburban towns northeast and east of Worcester. The Telegram staff also produces Worcester Living (formerly Worcester Quarterly), a local lifestyle magazine. Before their sale to Community Newspaper Company in 1993, the T&G also owned the Hudson Sun and Marlboro Enterprise daily newspapers and Beacon Communications Corporation weekly newspapers in western Middlesex County, Massachusetts.
