= Worcester Plaza =

Office building in Worcester, Massachusetts

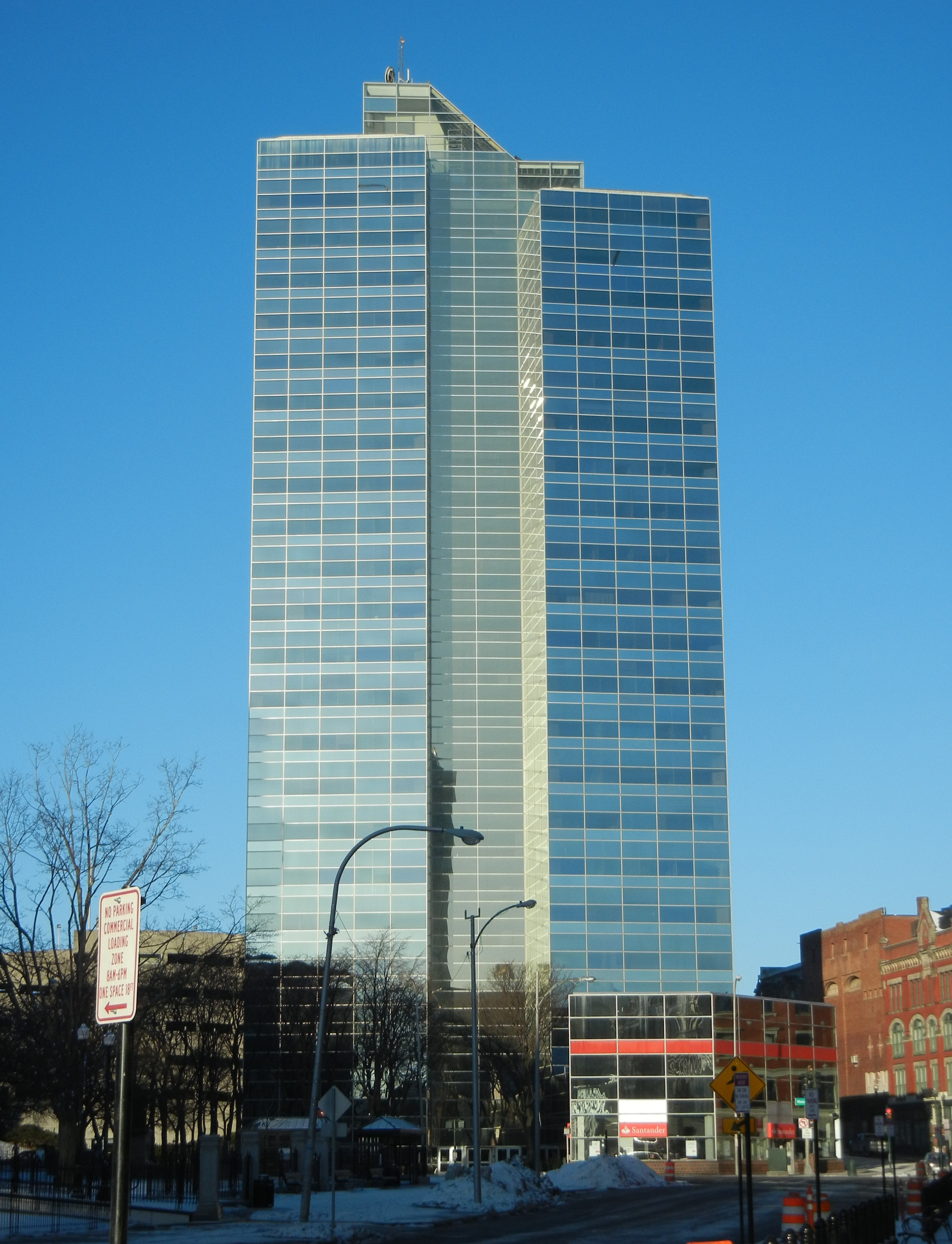
- Interactive map of the Worcester Plaza area
- Former names: Shawmut Bank Tower, Worcester County National Bank

General information
- Type: Commercial office
- Location: 446 Main Street, Worcester, Massachusetts
- Coordinates: 42.2633°N 71.8032°W
- Completed: 1974
- Owner: Synergy Investments

Height
- Roof: 289 feet (88 m)

Technical details
- Floor count: 24
- Floor area: 244,000 sq ft (22,700 m^{2})
- Lifts/elevators: 6

Design and construction
- Architect: Kevin Roche John Dinkeloo and Associates

Website
- marketplace.vts.com/building/worcester-plaza-worcester-ma

Worcester Plaza (sometimes referred to as the Glass Tower) is a building located in downtown Worcester, Massachusetts at 446 Main Street. Designed by Kevin Roche John Dinkeloo and Associates, it was completed in 1974, and is currently tied with The 6Hundred as the tallest building in Worcester. It stands 289 feet (88 m) tall, is 24 stories high, and has 244,000 square feet (22,700 m^{2}) of total floor space. Its façade is completely glass, similar to the 790-foot (240 m) John Hancock Tower in nearby Boston. The tower was formerly known as the Worcester County National Bank Tower

The current building was built instead of a larger, more iconic design announced in 1969 that was never realized. The original design was a 696 feet (212 m) tall, 50 story, slender tower with an angled crown and would have been the "highest standing commercial building in New England.

The building was most recently sold in October 2019 to Boston-based Synergy Investments for $16.5 million. It previously sold for $21.5 million in 2000.

== History ==
In April 2024, a reservation-only observation deck/event venue called Top of the Tower opened on the 23rd and 24th floors. The 2-story observation deck is a multipurpose event space for weddings, parties, corporate events, conferences, and other gatherings. Unscheduled public viewing is not currently offered, unlike at most other observation decks. Top of the Tower is a successor to The Plaza Club, a private invite-only restaurant and bar which opened in 1974 on floor 24. The Plaza Club closed in March 1997.

== Photo gallery ==
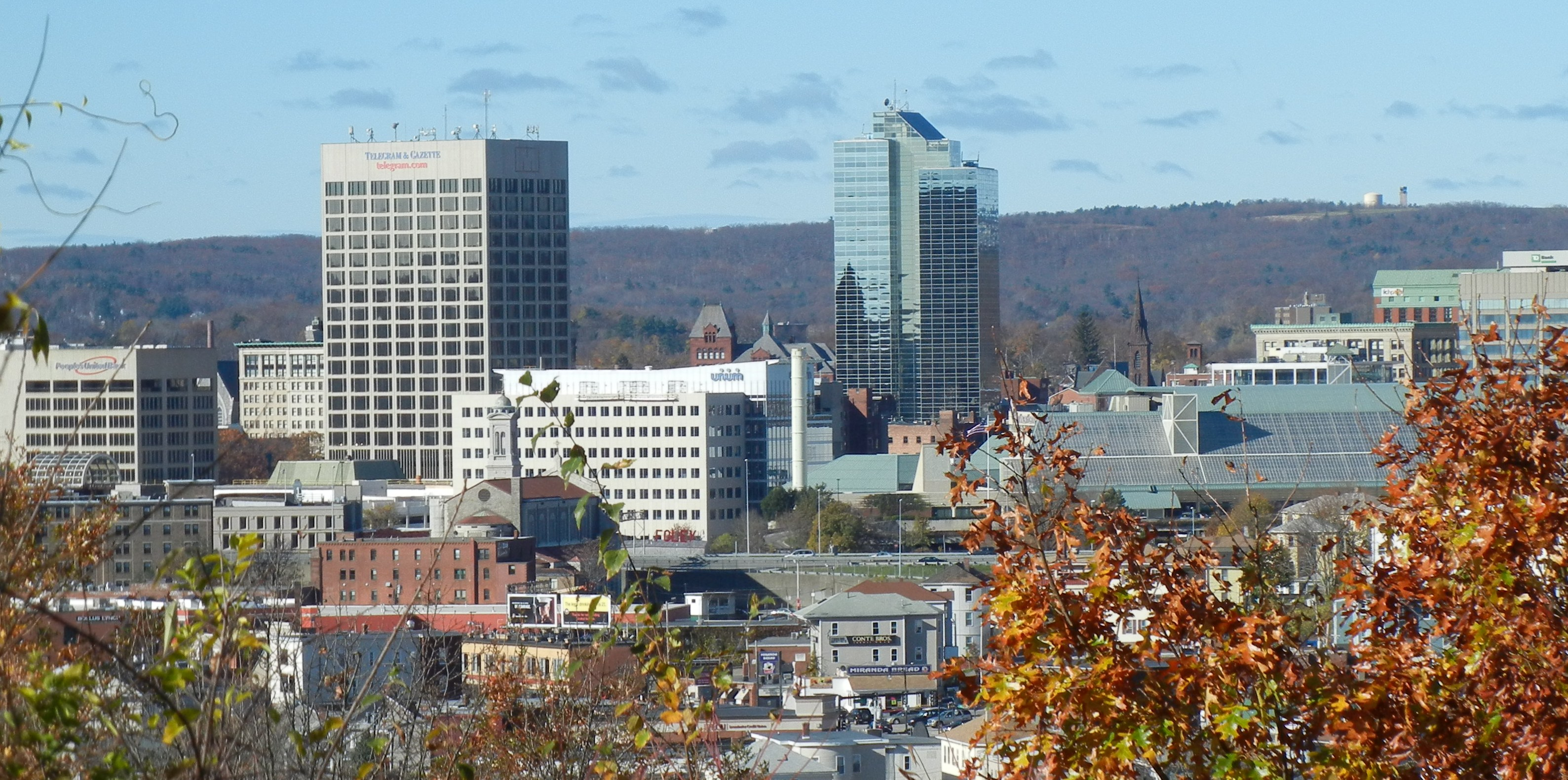
Worcester Skyline (2012)

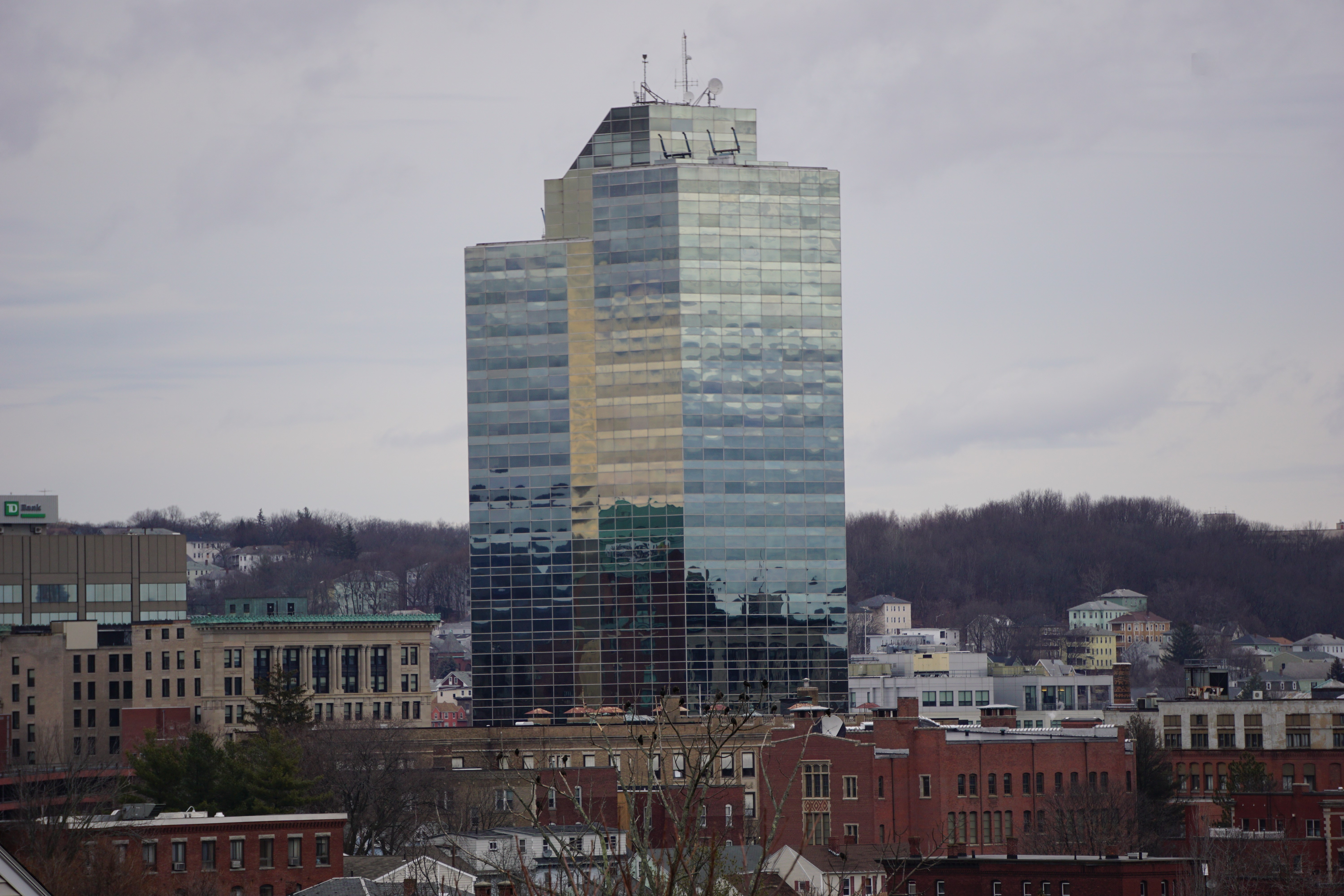
Worcester Plaza (2018)

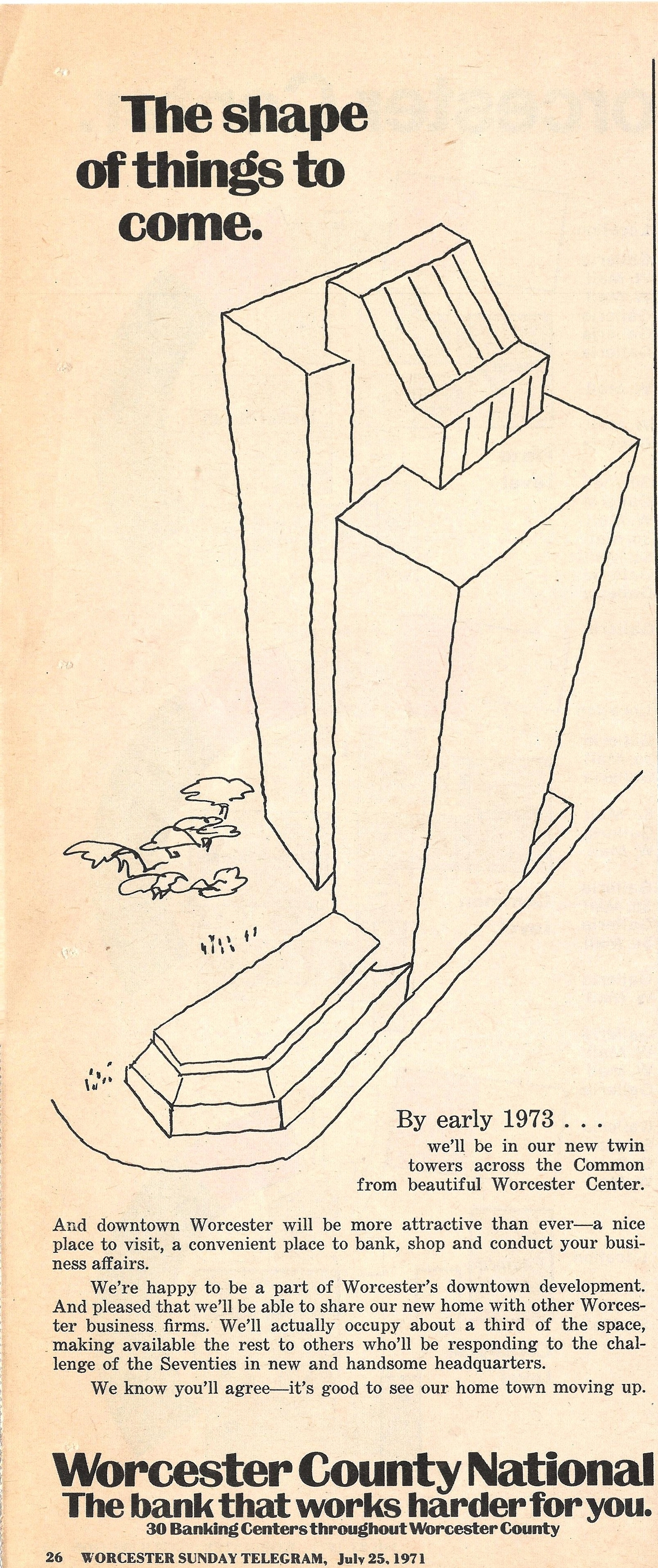
Worcester County National Bank Advertisement, pre-construction (1971)

| Preceded by 100 Front Street | Tallest Building in Worcester; 1974—Present; 88m | Succeeded by Tied with The 6Hundred; 1991—Present |
