= The 6Hundred =

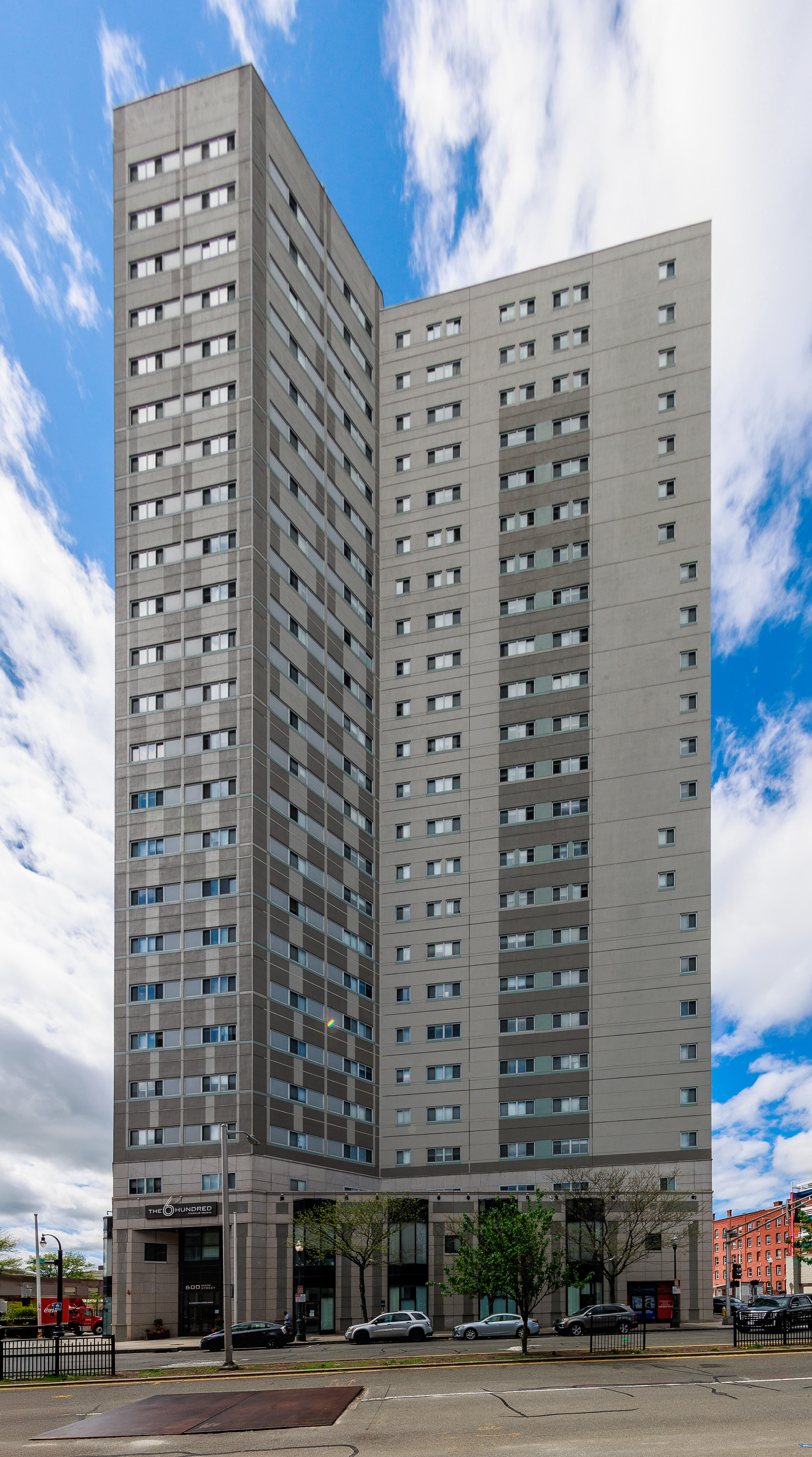
- Austin Street (northeast) façade
- Interactive map of the The 6Hundred area
- Former names: Skymark Tower, The Tower at Franklin Square

General information
- Type: Residential, commercial office
- Location: 600 Main St, Worcester, Massachusetts
- Coordinates: 42.260315°N 71.804919°W
- Construction started: 1986
- Completed: 1991
- Cost: US$21 million
- Owner: Benedict Canyon Equities
- Operator: Greystar Real Estate Partners

Height
- Roof: 289 feet (88 m)

Technical details
- Floor count: 24
- Floor area: 247,000 sq ft (22,900 m^{2})
- Lifts/elevators: 2

Design and construction
- Developer: James J. Soffan

Website
- www.live6hundred.com

The 6Hundred (formerly known as the Sky Mark Tower) is a mixed-use skyscraper located in downtown Worcester, Massachusetts. It stands 289 feet (88 m) tall, is 24 stories high, and has 247,000 square feet (22,900 m^{2}) of total floor space, including ground floor office space and 206 rental apartments. It was completed in 1991, and is currently tied with Worcester Plaza as the tallest building in Worcester. It was briefly known as The Tower at Franklin Square during planning and construction.

== History ==
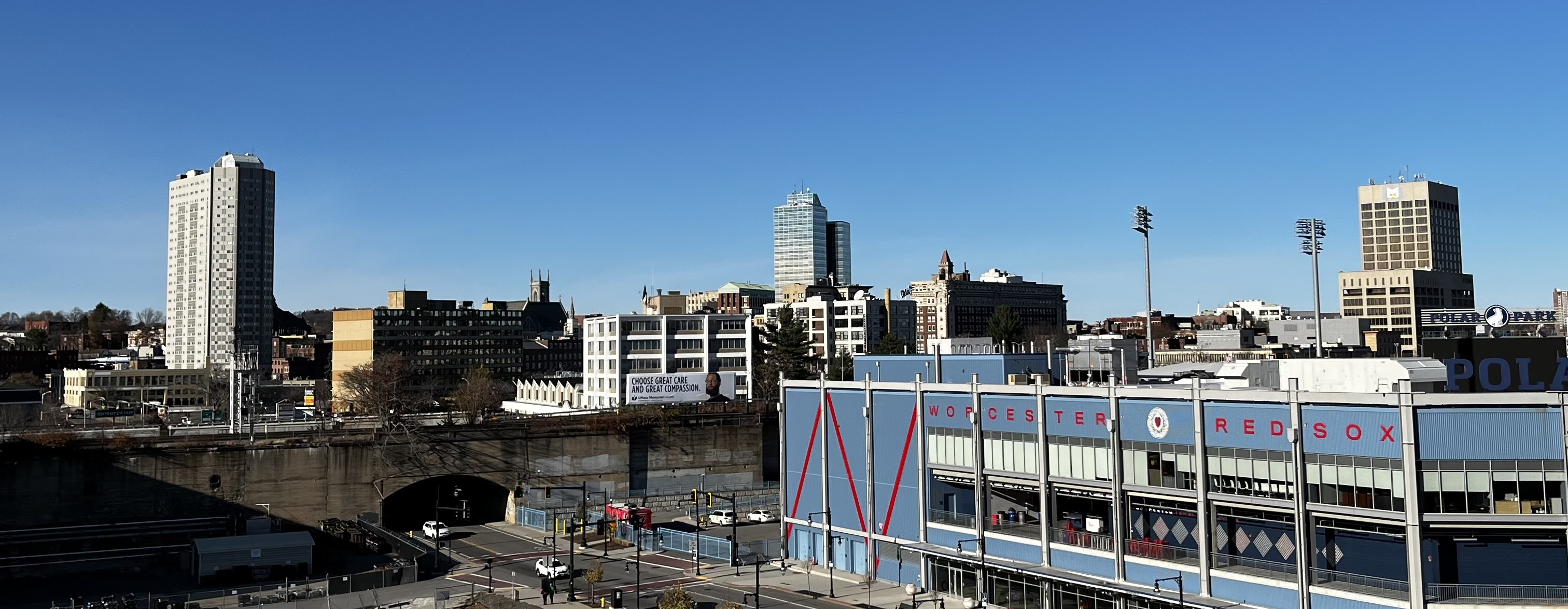
The 6Hundred (left) amongst the Worcester skyline in November 2024

In September 2019, Benedict Canyon Equities purchased the building from VTT Management, for US$28.8 million.

In 2022, a US$3 million renovation project by The Architectural Team was completed. The renovation included improvements to the building entrance and lobby, façade repairs, elevator modernization, and upgrades to signage and accent lighting. A prior major renovation project occurred in 2000.

== Image gallery ==
The 6Hundred
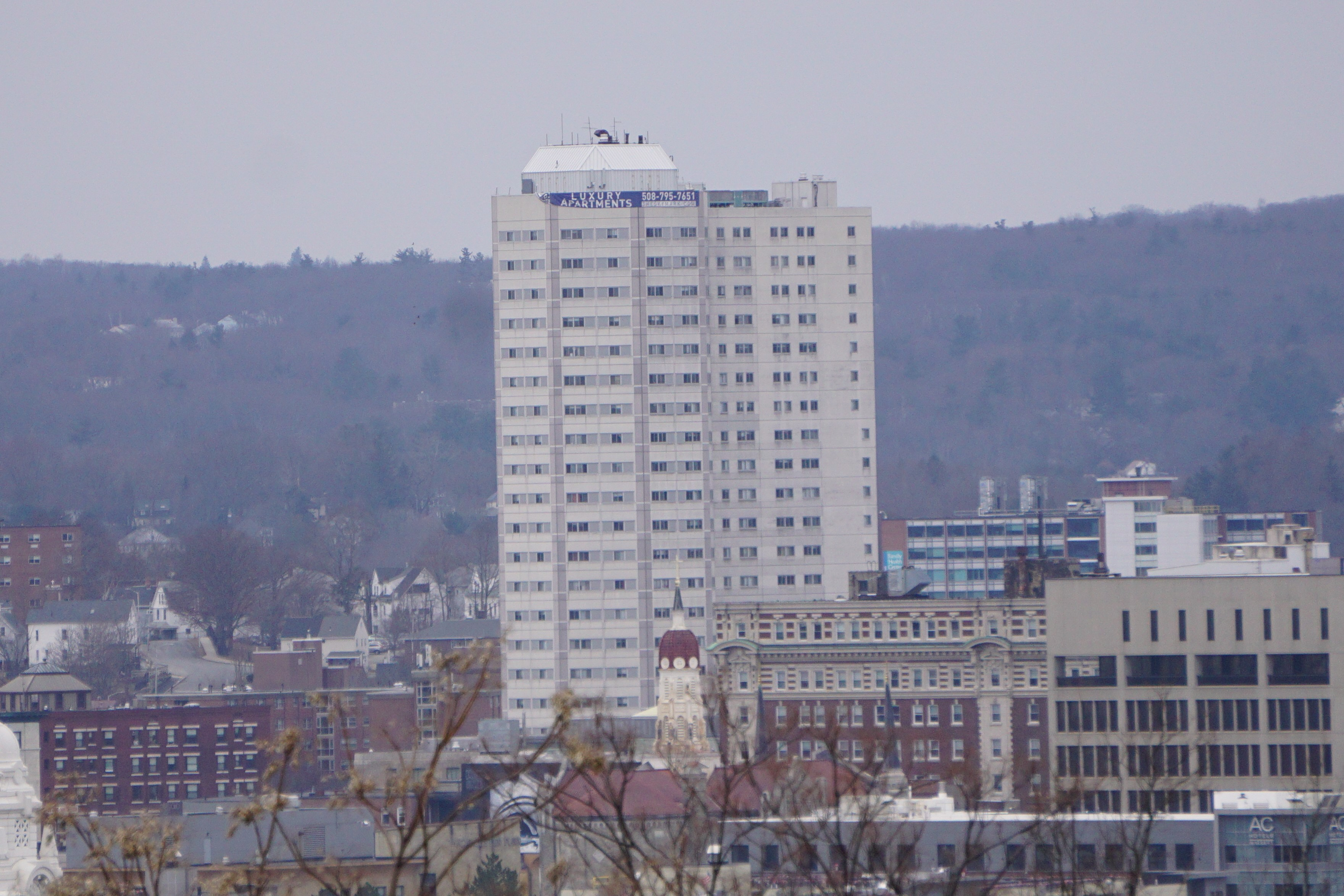
2018

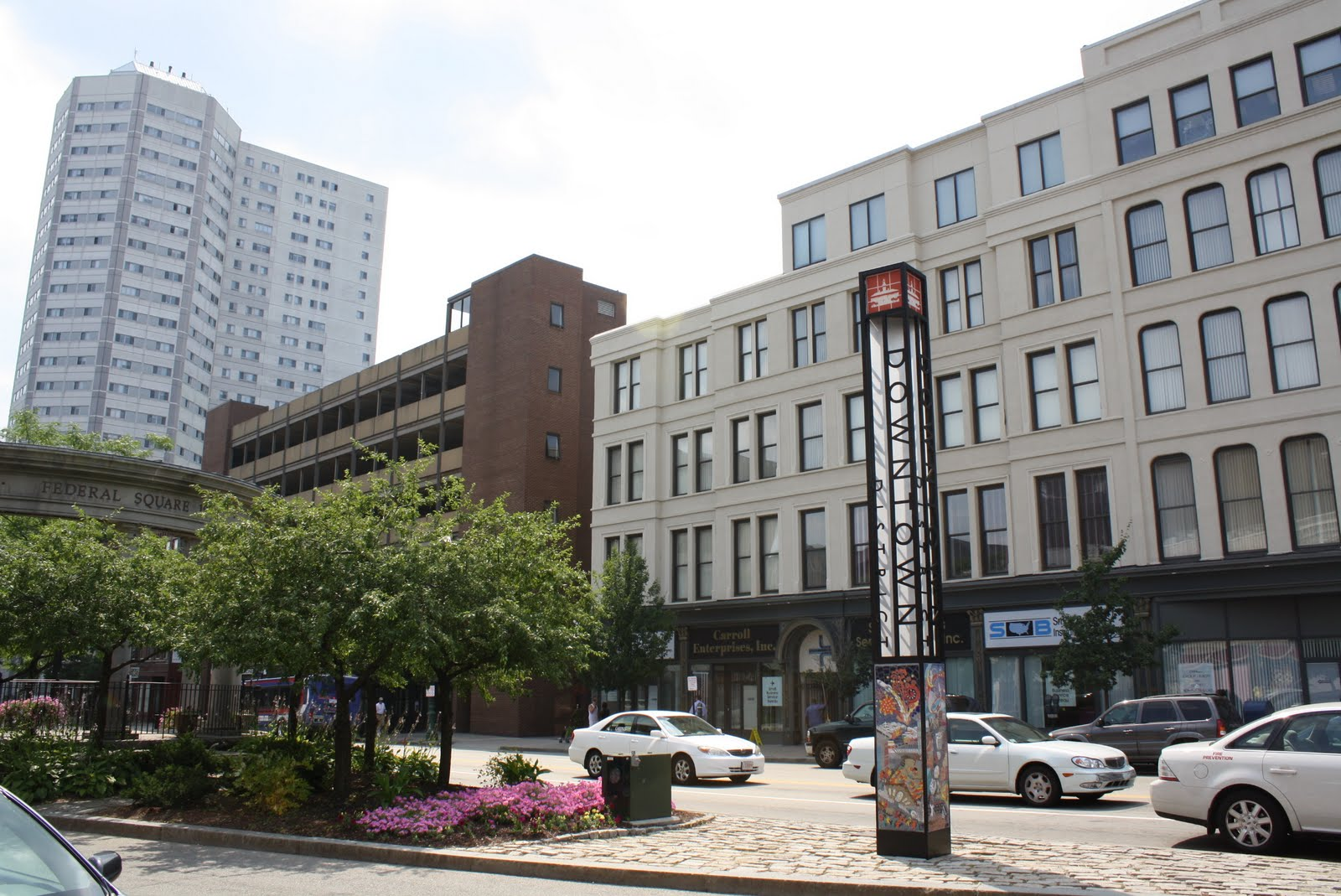
Federal Square in the foreground

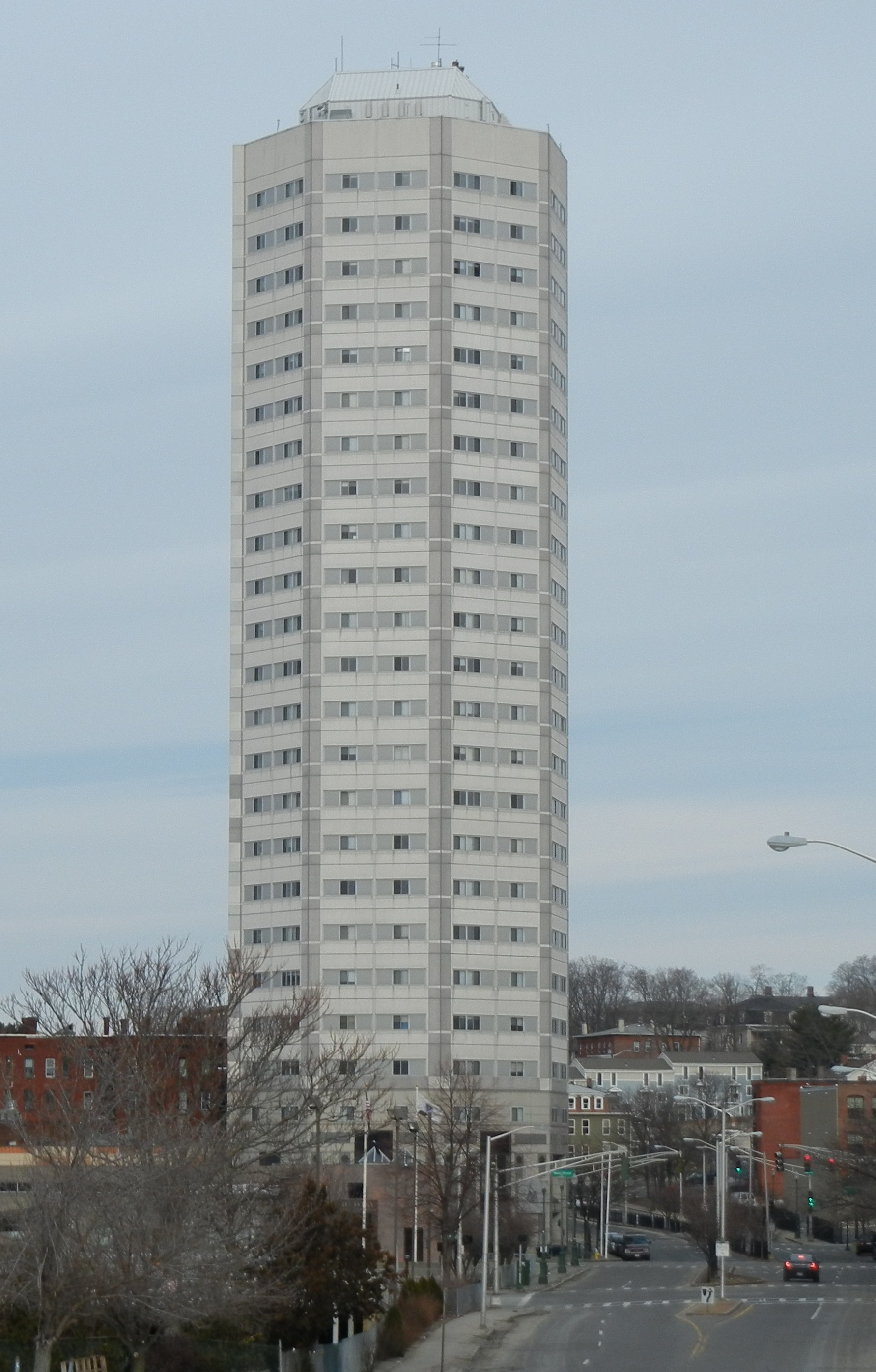
Main Street (southeast) façade
