= Worcester Center Galleria =

Worcester Center
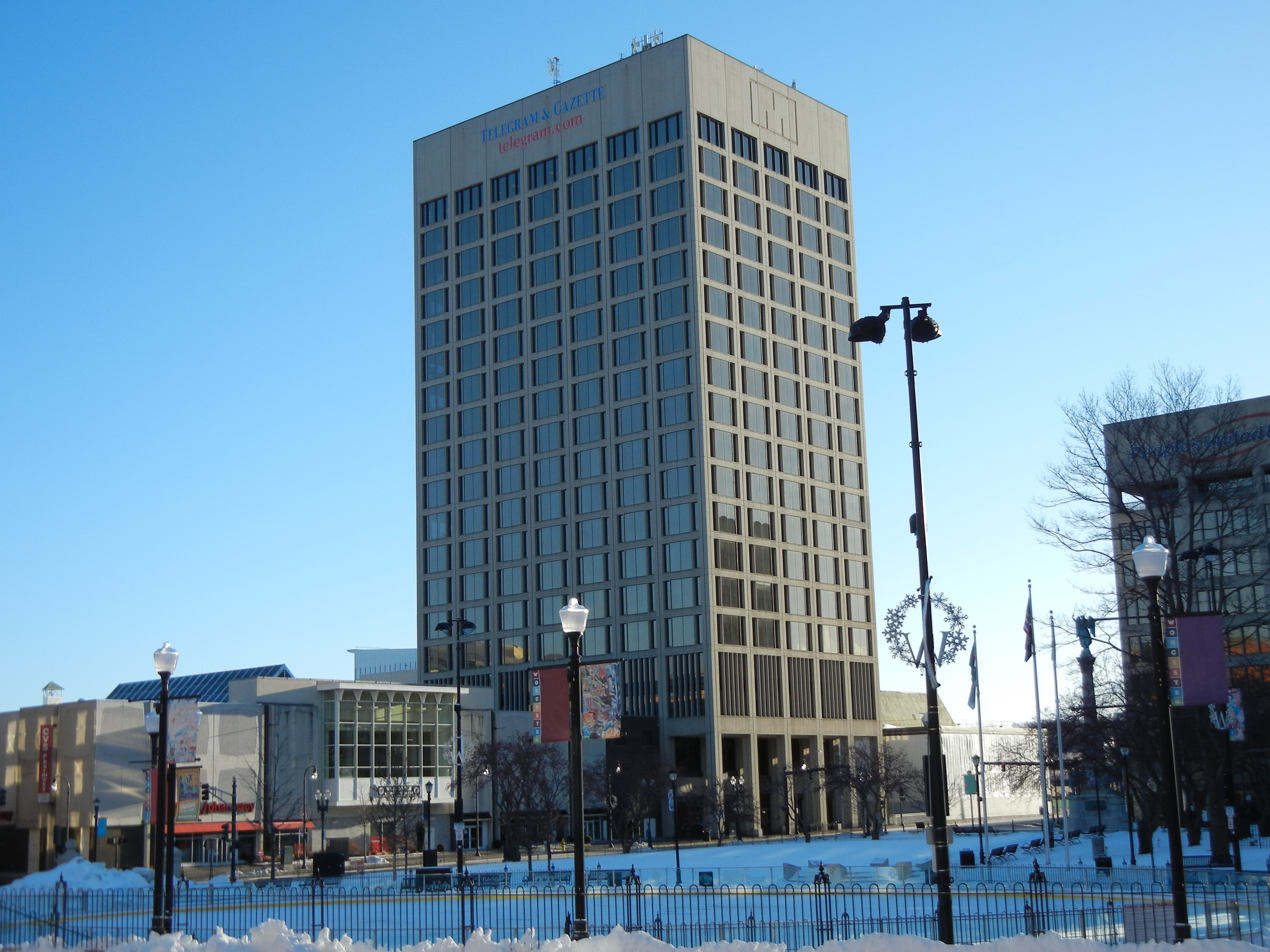
- Worcester Center on January 26, 2014
- Location: Worcester, Massachusetts, United States
- Coordinates: 42.262225°N 71.79851°W
- Address: 100 Front Street
- Opened: July 29, 1971
- Closed: April 2006 (demolished September 13, 2010–May 18, 2011)
- Developer: Worcester Center Associates
- Architect: Welton Becket and Associates
- Num. of stores: 126
- Num. of anchor tenants: 3 (Worcester Center Galleria); 5 (Worcester Common Fashion Outlets)
- Floor area: 1,000,000 sq ft (93,000 m^{2})
- Floors: 2
- Parking: 4,300 space garage

The Worcester Center Galleria, located in Downtown Worcester, Massachusetts, was a two level shopping mall which originally opened on July 29, 1971, as a part of the Worcester Center urban renewal project. The mall, which connected the 100 Front Street and 120 Front Street office towers, was successful for 20 years until it closed following a series of store vacancies. The mall re-opened in 1994 as a short-lived outlet center called Worcester Common Fashion Outlets, finally closing in 2006. The mall was demolished and redeveloped into a project called CitySquare.

== History ==
=== 1971–1993: Beginnings ===
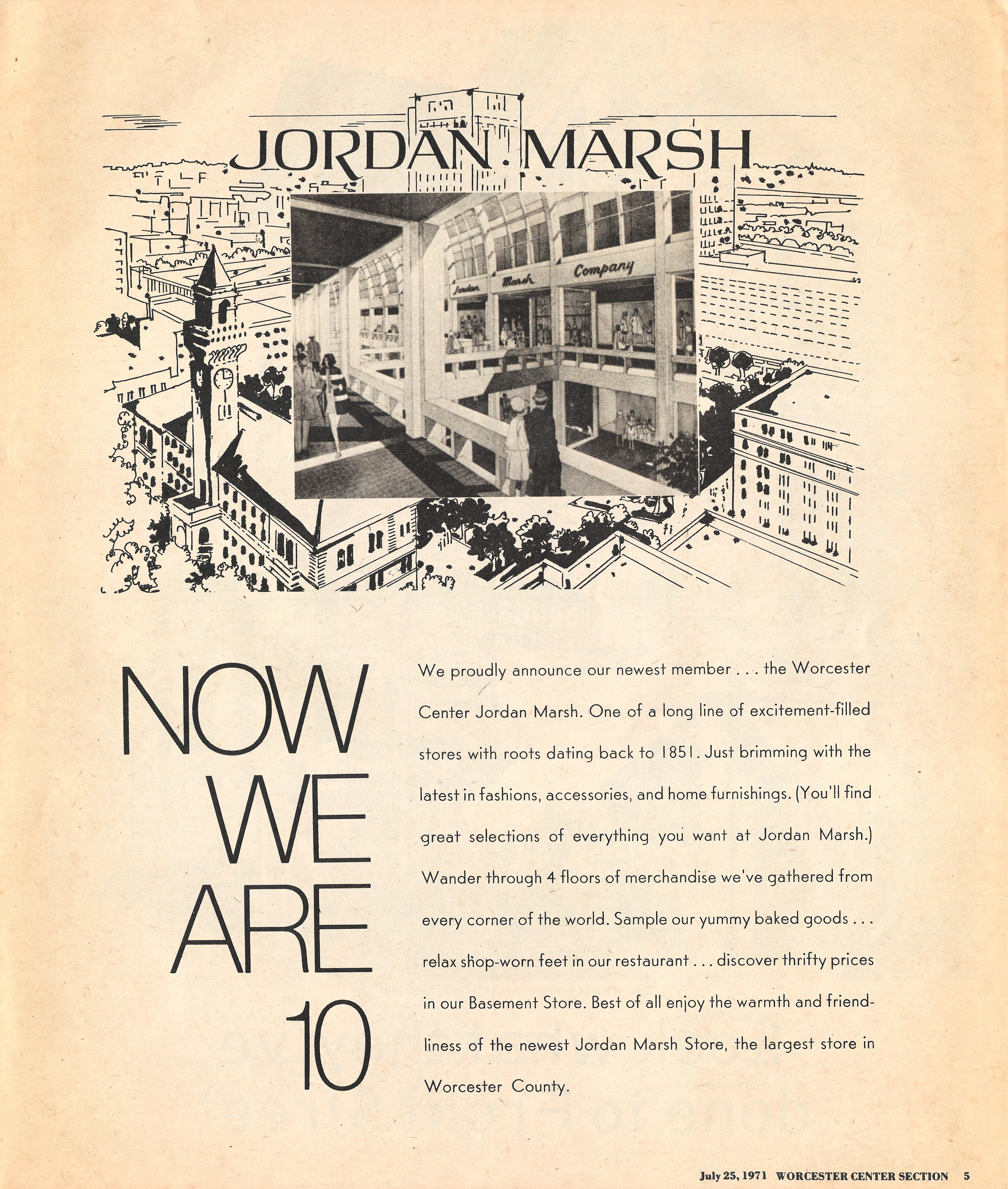
Advertisement for Jordan Marsh, 1971

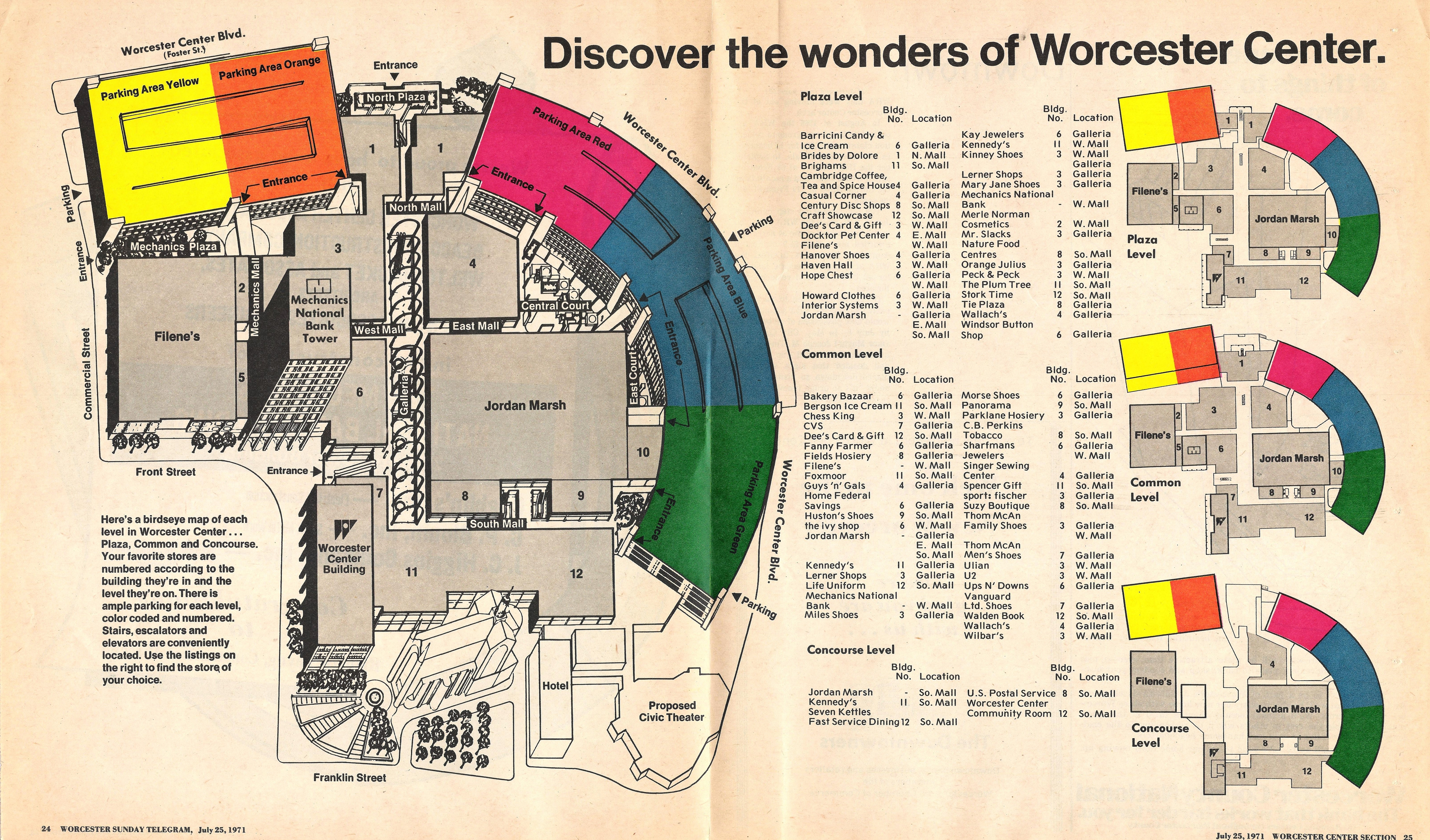
Mall Guide, 1971

The Worcester Center Galleria opened on July 29, 1971. To be built, a large swath of Worcester's downtown was demolished to make room for the 1,000,000 square feet (93,000 m^{2}) mall and two connected skyscrapers (100 Front Street and 120 Front Street). The Galleria had a large open area with an arched roof that was supposedly modeled after the Galleria Vittorio Emanuele II in Milan, Italy. The design for the mall also included a 4,300-space parking garage, which, at the time, was the largest parking structure in the world. Two construction experts from New York and California had called the original mall "the finest shopping center they had ever seen in the United States." The original anchor stores included Filene's, Jordan Marsh, and Kennedy's. the mall was hugely popular from 1971-1986 but By the late 1980s, the mall started to decline because two of the major anchors, Filene's and Jordan Marsh, had moved out, and other area malls such as the Auburn Mall and Greendale Mall began drawing away customers.

According to the city's 2024 comprehensive plan, the Worcester Galleria closed in 1991 after many stores had vacated the mall. It reopened in 1994 as Worcester Common Fashion Outlets.

=== 1994–2003: Revitalization ===
In 1994, Worcester Center Associates sold the Galleria to New England Development which slowly shut down the remaining stores with plans to revitalize the mall. On October 29, 1994, the Galleria reopened as the Worcester Common Fashion Outlets, with Judith Light taking the role of spokesperson, appearing in a large publicity campaign for the mall. With the reopening, there were drastic changes to the stores housed in the mall and the look and layout of it. The original anchors were gone and replaced with Sports Authority, Bed Bath and Beyond, Saks Off Fifth Avenue Outlet, Media Play, and Filene's Basement (later VF Factory Outlet). After the re-opening, the mall contained a total of 126 outlet stores.

As time went on, this re-marketing of the mall did not help. In 1996 the name was changed another time to simply Worcester Common Outlets, and in 1997, a larger outlet mall, the Wrentham Village Premium Outlets, opened off nearby Interstate 495 in Wrentham, Massachusetts drawing from the Common Outlets' customer base.

=== 2004–present: Closure and redevelopment ===
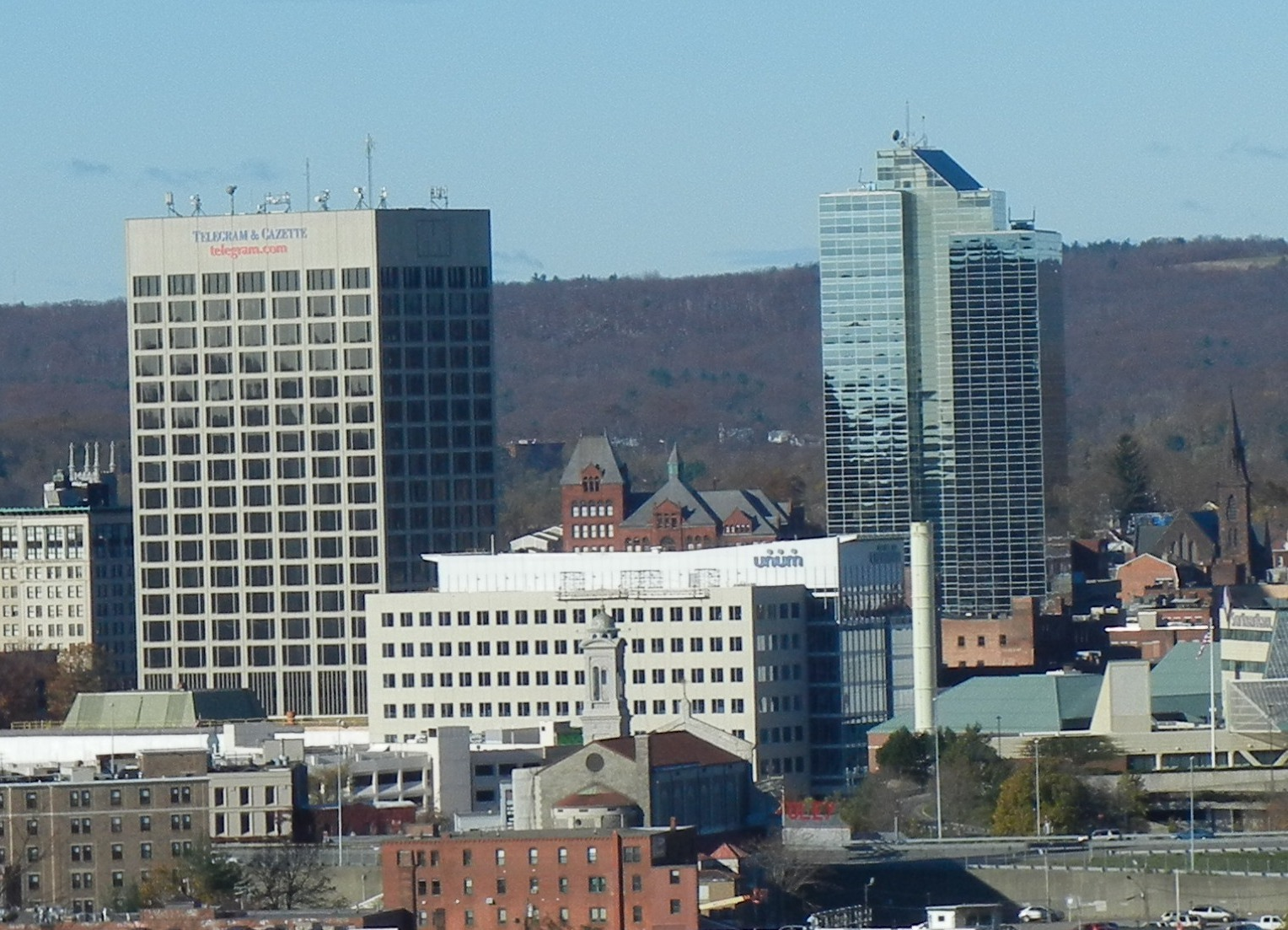
Unum Company's Massachusetts headquarters at One Mercantile Place in downtown Worcester, Massachusetts

Business at the mall slowly died down until June 22, 2004, when Berkeley Investments, along with its capital partner, Starwood Capital of Greenwich, Connecticut announced that they would buy the Worcester Common Outlets. After the announcement of the acquisition, leases in the mall were not renewed and it slowly emptied. The mall closed for good in April 2006. Berkeley has demolished a large portion of the mall and has begun construction of a mixed-use development named CitySquare where a combination of retail, housing and office space will replace the mall. Berkeley Investments planned on keeping the parking garages and Worcester Foothills Theatre, which called a section of the basement of the mall home, until it suspended operations on May 10, 2009, due to lack of funding.

The project is an example of transit oriented development because of its proximity to public transportation.

The $563 million project to construct CitySquare stalled for years as Berkeley Investments struggled to secure tenants. The first phase of the project received city approval in May 2008. In March 2009, it was announced that Unum Group, an insurance company, would lease more than 175,000 square feet (16,300 m^{2}) in the future CitySquare development. This allowed $25 million in state demolition funding to flow. On September 13, 2010, demolition of portions of the former mall started and on May 18, 2011, visible exterior demolition began.
