= Worcester City Hall and Common =

- U.S. National Register of Historic Places
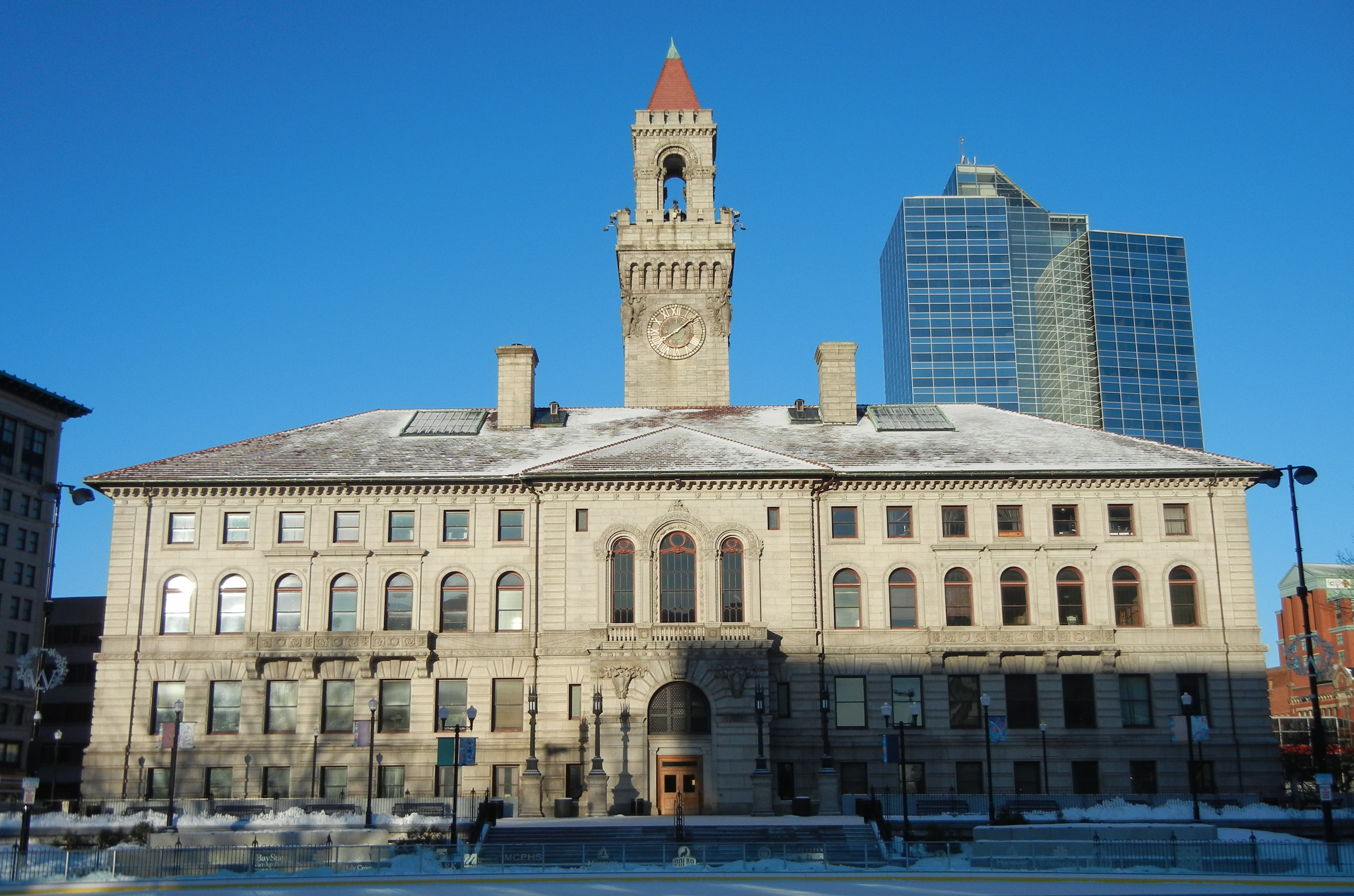
- City Hall viewed from Worcester Common

- Location within Massachusetts Location within the United States
- Location: 455 Main St., Worcester, Massachusetts
- Coordinates: 42°15′44″N 71°48′6″W
- Built: 1669 (1898)
- Architect: Peabody & Stearns
- Architectural style: Late 19th And 20th Century Revivals
- MPS: Worcester MRA
- NRHP reference No.: 78001405
- Added to NRHP: March 29, 1978

The Worcester City Hall and Common, the civic heart of the city, are a historic city hall and town common at 455 Main Street in Worcester, Massachusetts, United States. The city hall and common were added to the National Register of Historic Places in 1978.

== Early history ==
The Common, established in 1669, originally encompassed about 20 acres (8.1 ha), compared to its present size of 4.4 acres (1.8 ha). A meeting house used for both town meetings and religious functions was constructed on the Common in 1719, on the same site as the current City Hall. In 1763, the first meeting house was demolished and what became known as The Old South Meeting House was constructed on the site. It was here, on July 14, 1776, that Isaiah Thomas publicly read the Declaration of Independence for the first time in New England.

== Salem Square ==
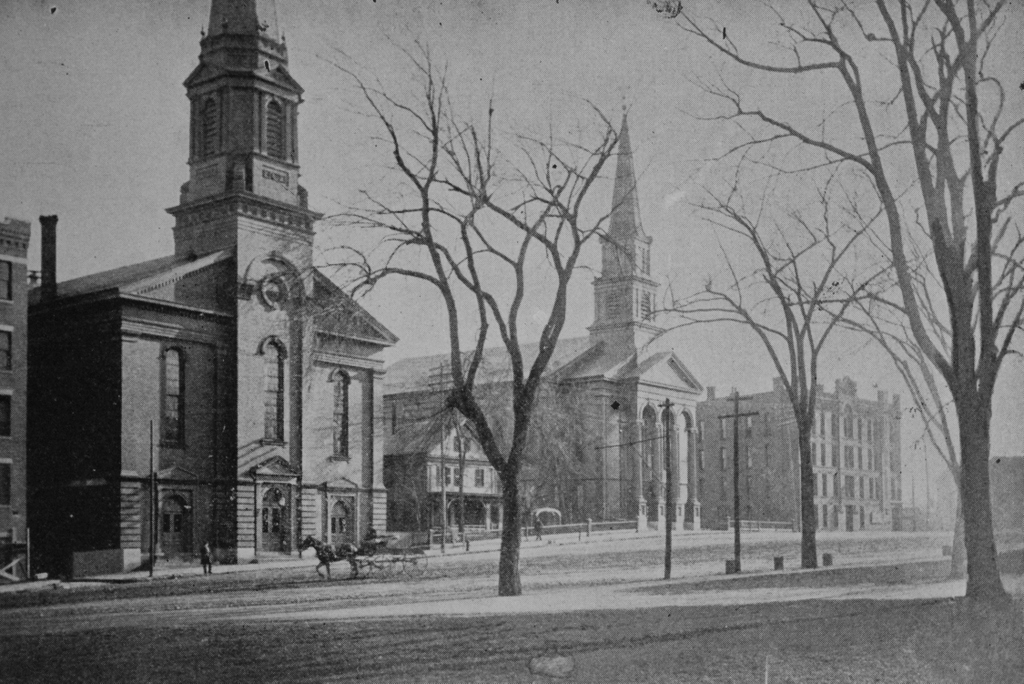
The churches of Salem Square ca 1895

Salem Square was a triangular-shaped plaza on the east side of Worcester Common. Facing the square were two churches, the First Baptist Church (c. 1830s), and the Congregational Church (c. 1848).

Most of Salem Square was eliminated in the early 1970s as part of the Worcester Center urban renewal project, which replaced the plaza with an office building, shopping mall, and parking garage.

== Notre Dame des Canadiens ==
The Notre Dame des Canadiens was a landmark church which faced Salem Square and Worcester Common from 1929 to 2018. In the 1920s, the Catholic Church purchased the Baptist Church on Salem Square and razed it in 1927 to build a new church to serve the city's French Catholic population, the cathedral-like Notre Dame des Canadiens. The neo-Romanesque church measured 198 feet long, 91 feet wide, and 64 feet high, and ran from Trumbull Street to Salem Square. The building featured two towers with gold crosses and a 194-foot high bell tower.

The Roman Catholic diocese closed the church in 2008, due to falling attendance. The building was sold in 2010 and demolished in October 2018.

== City Hall ==
Worcester City Hall was designed by Peabody & Stearns and built by the Norcross Brothers in 1898. The Italianate structure was built with a granite exterior, and was partly modeled after Italian Renaissance palazzos. Its tower shares some similarity to that of the Palazzo Vecchio in Florence, Italy, and the interior of the building extensively uses marble, commonly seen in Italian Renaissance buildings, and features an interior courtyard where the upper floors have balconies supported by decorated round arches. City Hall is currently the 4th tallest building in Worcester.

== Burial ground, Civil War Memorial, and fountain ==
Near the center of the Common is the meeting house's burial ground, marked by gravestones and the Bigelow Monument. The Soldiers' Monument, located near the northeast corner of the Common, honors the 398 Worcester soldiers killed in the American Civil War. The Burnside Fountain, located near the southeast corner of the Common, provided water for horses, and features the sculpture Boy with a Turtle, commonly known as "Turtle Boy."

== Photo Gallery ==
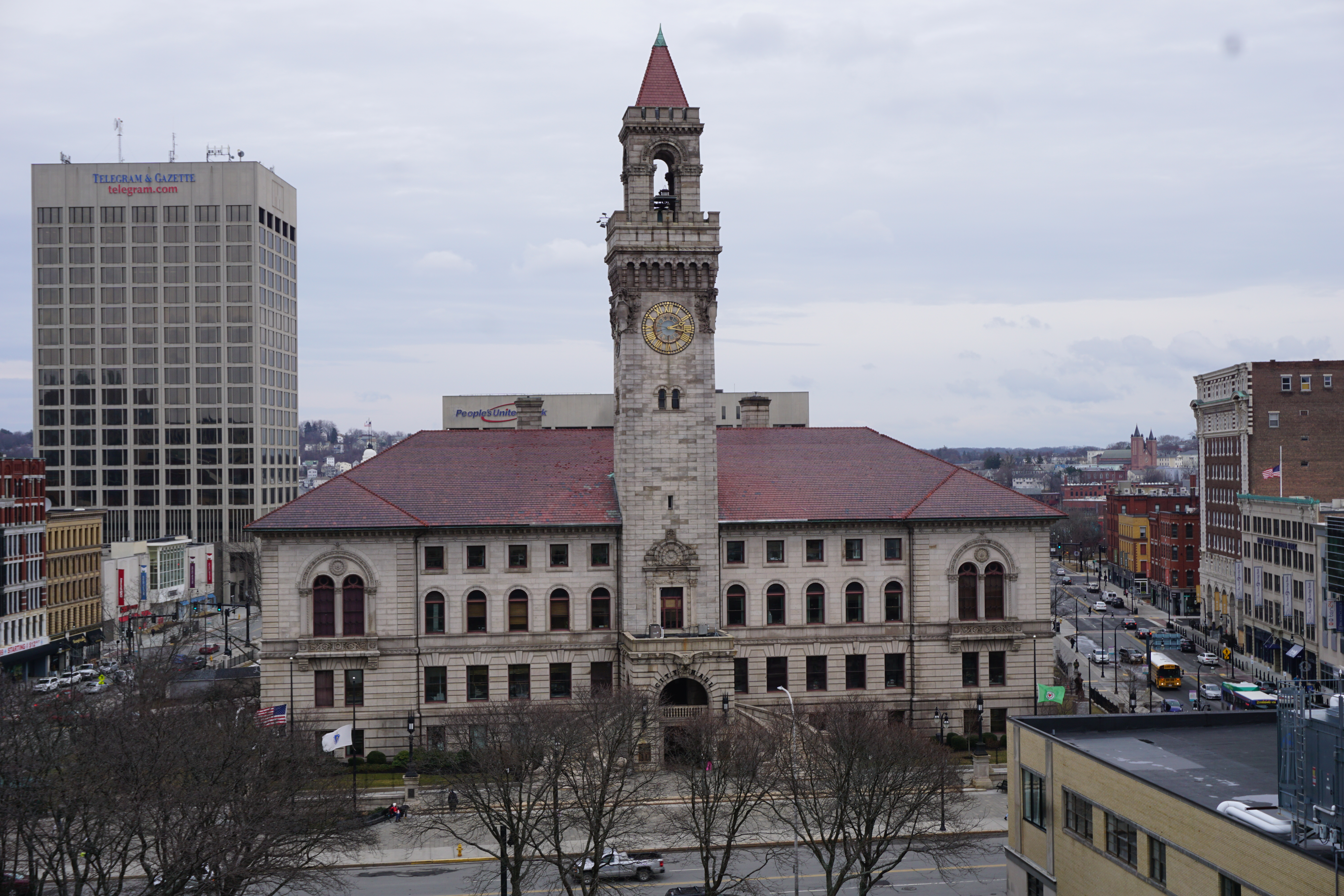
City Hall, front view

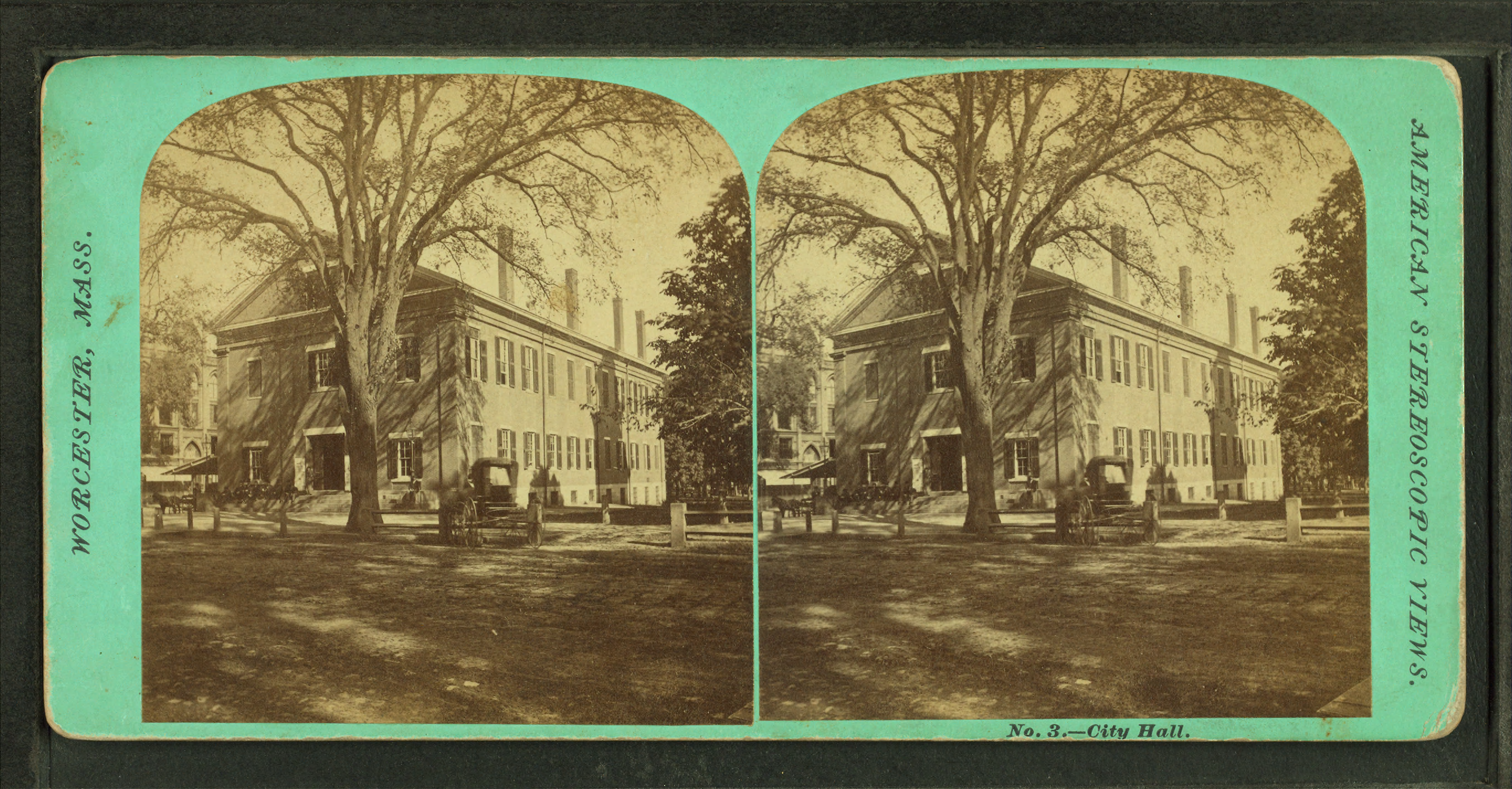
Old South Meeting House (circa 1885), demolished 1890s

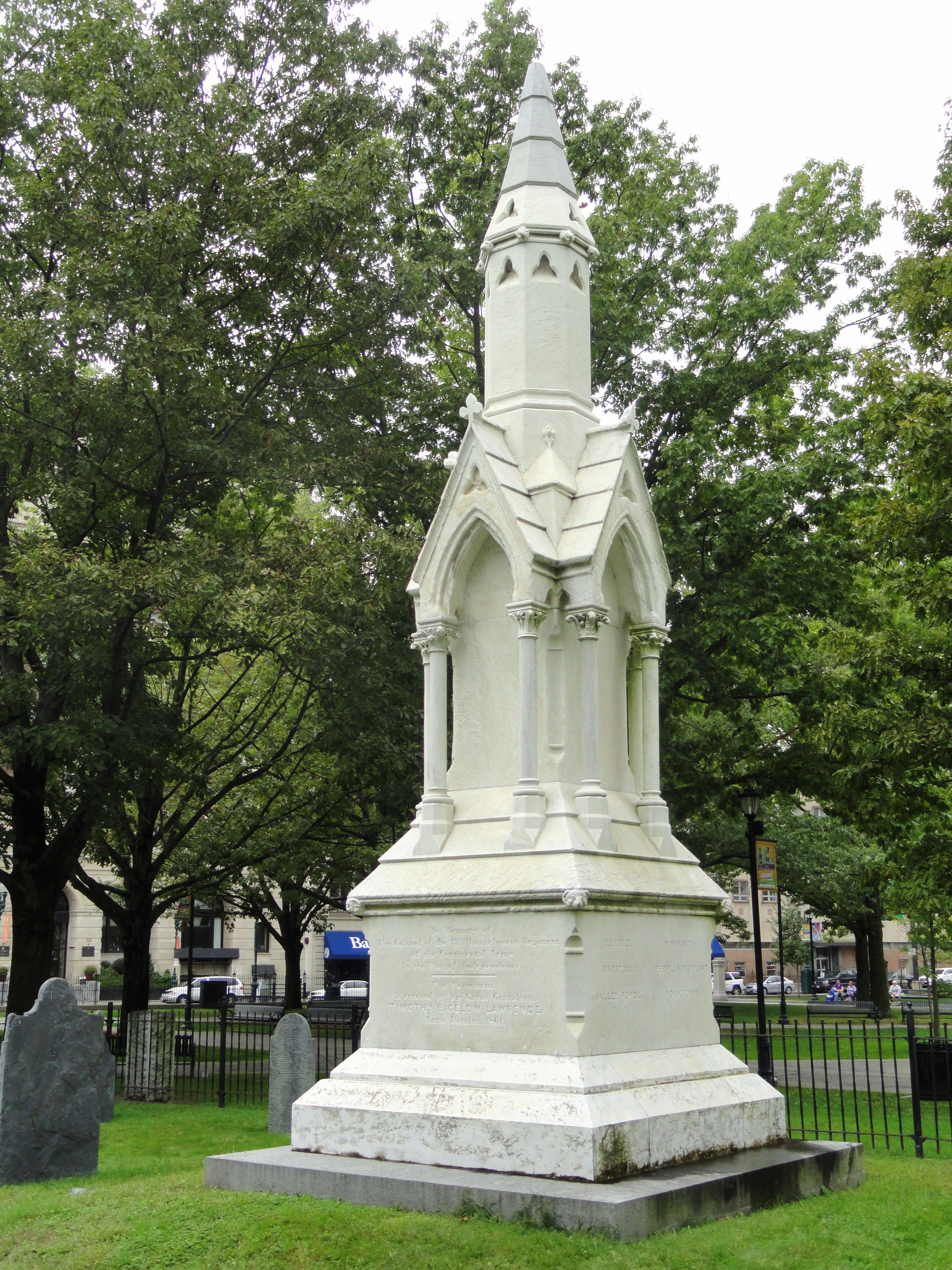
Bigelow Monument

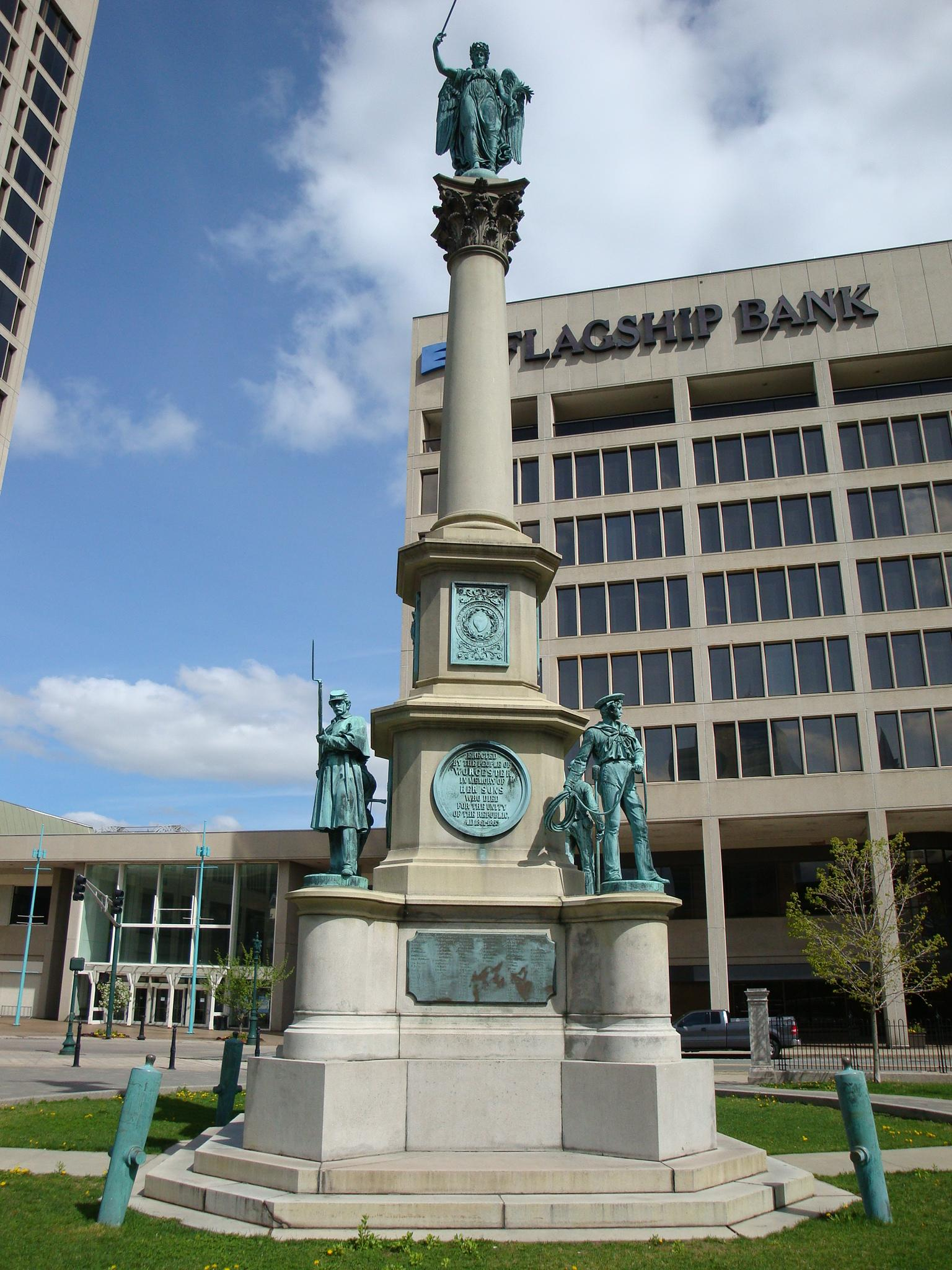
Soldiers' Monument

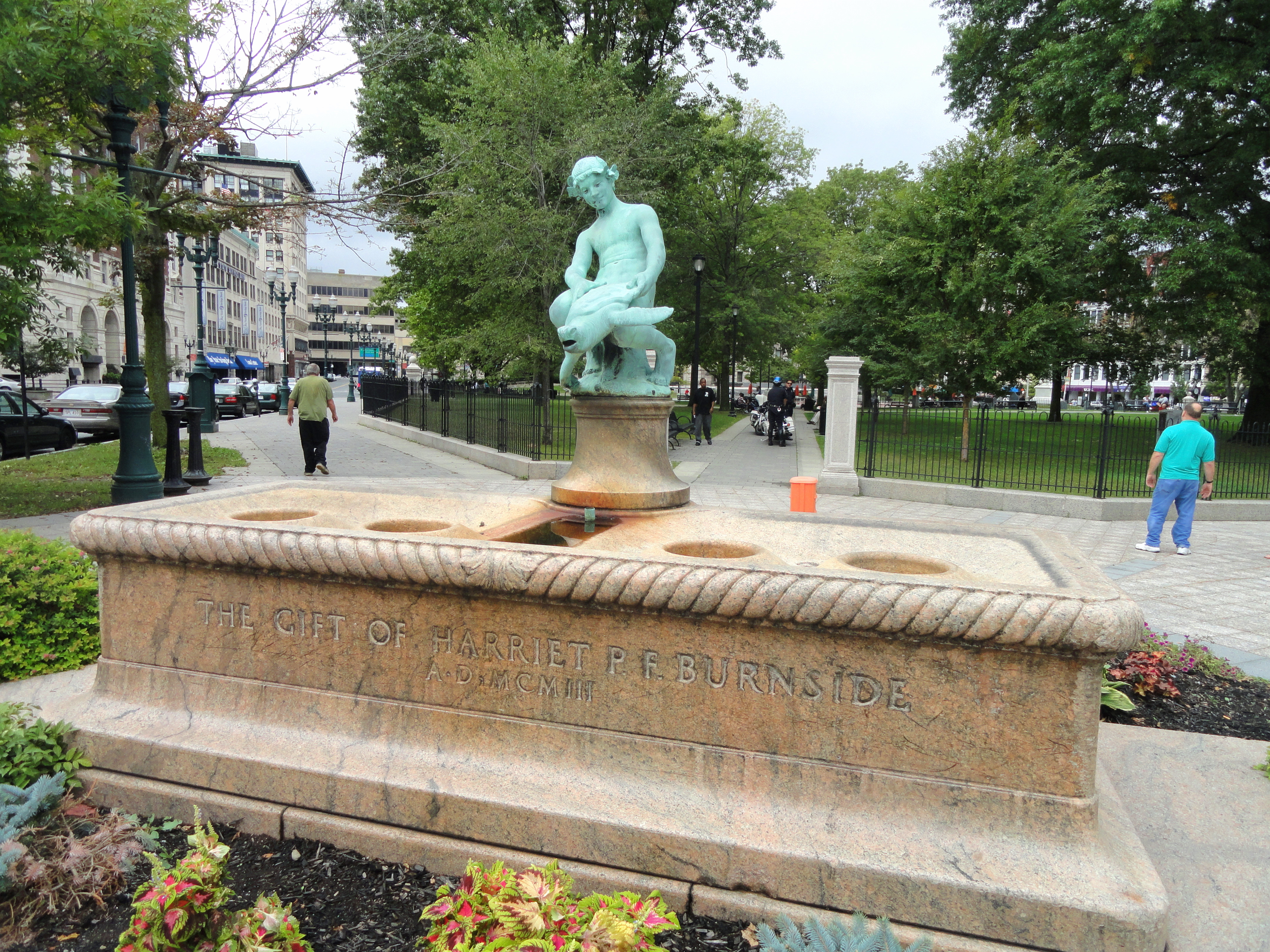
Burnside Fountain

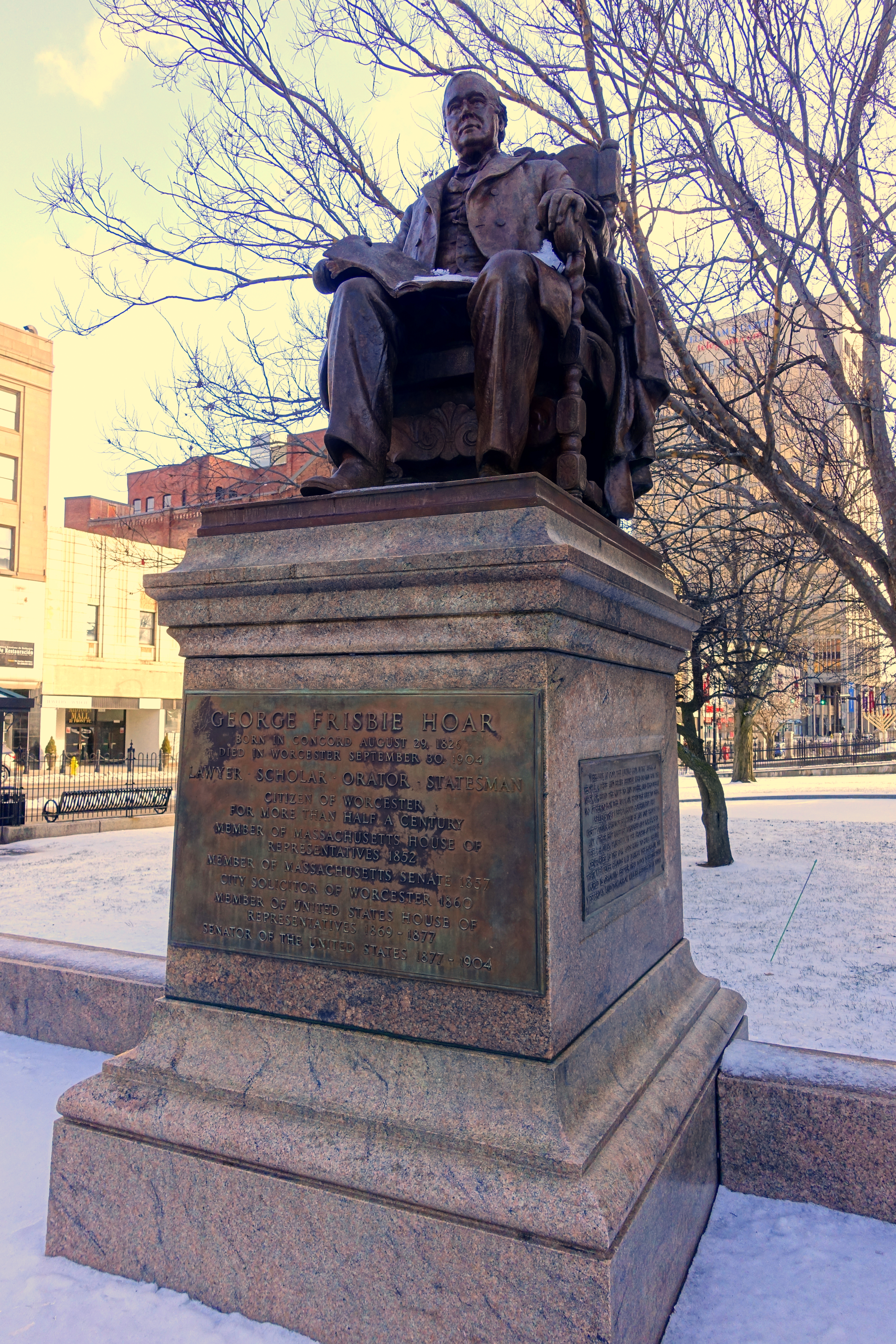
Statue of George Frisbie Hoar

== See also ==
- National Register of Historic Places listings in northwestern Worcester, Massachusetts
- National Register of Historic Places listings in Worcester County, Massachusetts

Preceded by Old State Mutual Building	Tallest Building in Worcester; 1898—1971; 69m	Succeeded by 100 Front Street
