= Burnside Fountain =

Drinking fountain with statue in Worcester, Massachusetts, United States

Coordinates: 42°15′41.3″N 71°48′0.82″W

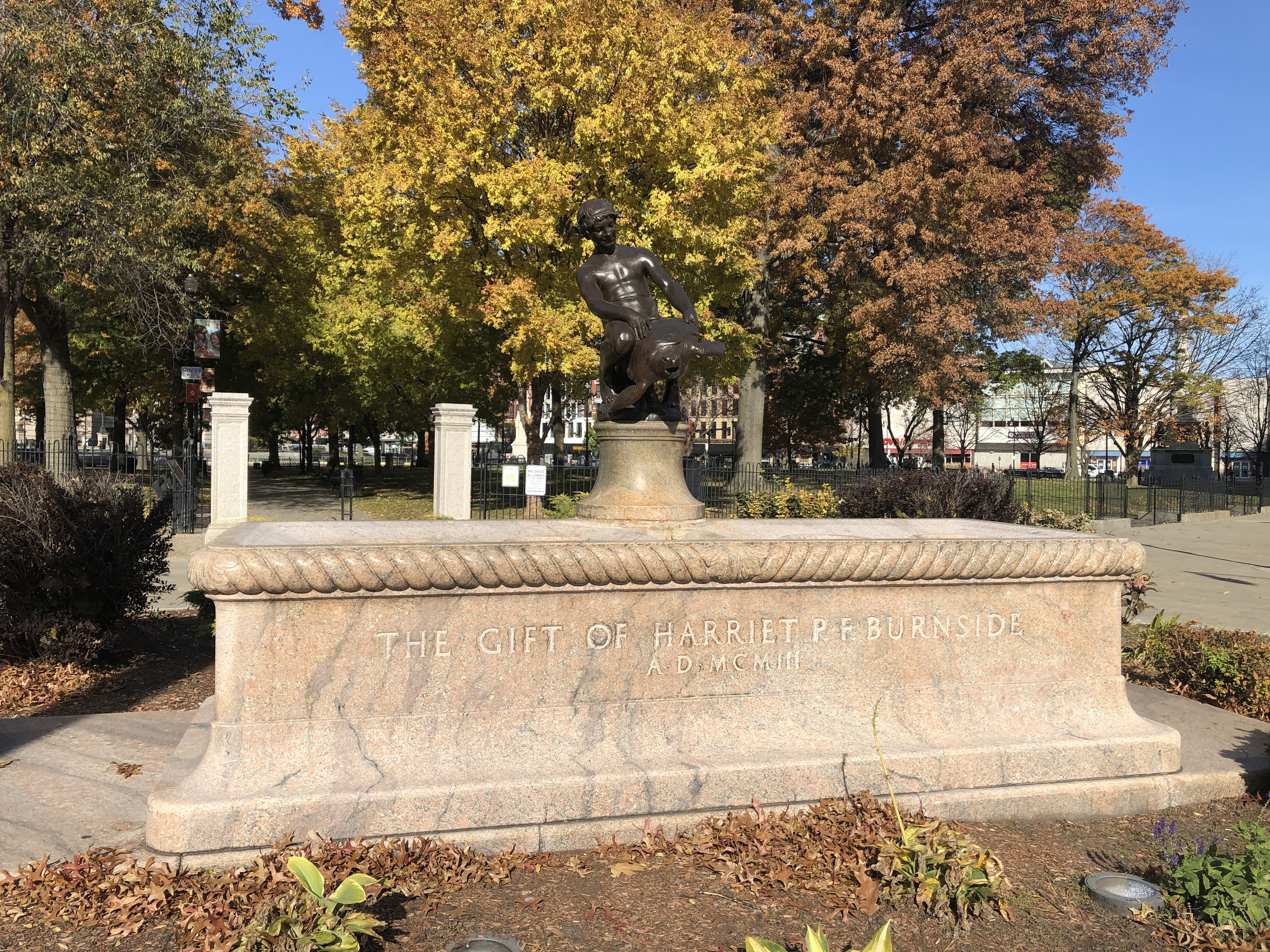
- Artist: Henry Bacon, architect Charles Y. Harvey, sculptor
- Year: 1912
- Type: Fountain in two parts; basin and sculpture
- Medium: Granite (basin) and bronze (sculpture)
- Dimensions: 1.5 m × 3.7 m (5 ft × 12 ft);
- Location: Worcester Common, Worcester, Massachusetts, U.S.
- Owner: City of Worcester

The Burnside Fountain is a non-functioning drinking fountain at the southeast corner of Worcester Common in Worcester, Massachusetts. It consists of two parts, a pink granite basin, and a bronze statue of a young boy riding a sea turtle.

The Burnside Fountain was commissioned in 1905 by the city of Worcester—the prior year, Harriet F. Burnside had bequeathed US$5,000 (equivalent to about $179,000 in 2025) to create a fountain to provide fresh water for horses and dogs in the memory of her father, a prominent lawyer. The basin was designed by architect Henry Bacon, who later designed the Lincoln Memorial in Washington, D.C., and the figure was created by sculptor Charles Y. Harvey. Harvey died by suicide before finishing the sculpture, and Sherry Edmundson Fry completed the bronze. The fountain was installed in 1912 in Central Square, then moved in 1969 to its current location on Worcester Common. In 1970, the statue was stolen, and was re-installed two years later. An attempted theft occurred in 2004.

The bronze is officially named Boy with a Turtle but is known to locals as Turtle Boy. Turtle Boy has become an unofficial mascot for Worcester, much in the same way Manneken Pis is for Brussels. The Burnside Fountain's popularity is derived mostly from viewers' risqué misinterpretation of the statue. Over its 114-year existence, it has been referenced in stories and songs, as well as having a music contest and a microbrew named after it.

== Description ==
The Burnside Fountain consists of two parts, the basin and the sculpture. The pink granite basin is rectangular and has four large bowls, two on either end, carved into its top. These bowls were originally designed as water troughs for horses, and a smaller, lower, bowl located on the rear of the fountain was designed for dogs.

The bronze sculpture sits on a circular base in the middle of the basin. The sculpture is officially known as Boy with a Turtle, as its figure is of a young boy, in the nude, riding a sea turtle. In 1986, the Worcester municipal parks and recreation department described the statue with the sentence, "The boy holding the turtle, his hair flying, a sly smile on his face, is charming and disarming."

== Background ==
Samuel Burnside was a prominent lawyer in Worcester who studied law at Dartmouth College in the early 1800s. Burnside had three daughters, Sophia, Harriet, and Elizabeth, who went on to be called by Frederick Clifton Pierce "the most notable figures in the life of Worcester." The notability of the three daughters was due in part to the prestige and wealth Samuel Burnside had accrued as Chief Justice of the Court of Common Pleas. Both before and after Samuel Burnside's death on July 25, 1850, his three daughters were known for charitable works, having donated public gardens and a library to the city of Worcester. One daughter's most well-known donation to the city came in the form of a bequest in her will. In 1904, Harriet Burnside died and left $5,000 in her will to the city of Worcester to build a fountain as a memorial to her father.

== History ==
When Burnside bequeathed the money for the fountain, she asked that it be designed for use as a drinking trough for horses and also for dogs. The commission was originally intended for Daniel Chester French, but, according to a paper by Zelotes W. Coombs, French turned down the commission due to "pressure of other engagements, however... he did supervise the work." French assigned the design of the basin to Henry Bacon, who would later work with French on the Lincoln Memorial. The sculpture was assigned to Charles Y. Harvey, a graduate of the American Academy in Rome, who had worked with Augustus Saint-Gaudens on the Robert Gould Shaw Memorial in Boston.

Charles Y. Harvey began work on Boy with Turtle at his studio in New York City, believing that this work was going to be his masterpiece. Almost immediately, he began second guessing his design and feeling that it was inadequate. This negativity was a trait that he had shown many times in the past. Roughly a week after beginning the sculpture, Harvey began hearing voices commanding him to kill himself. A paper about restoring the sculpture, written at Worcester Polytechnic Institute (WPI) in 2011, stated "Harvey began to hear voices coming from the unfinished statue commanding him to take his own life." On January 27, 1912, Harvey headed to Bronx Park with two razors, and slit his own throat along the west bank of the Bronx River. His body was discovered the following morning, by some students walking through the park.

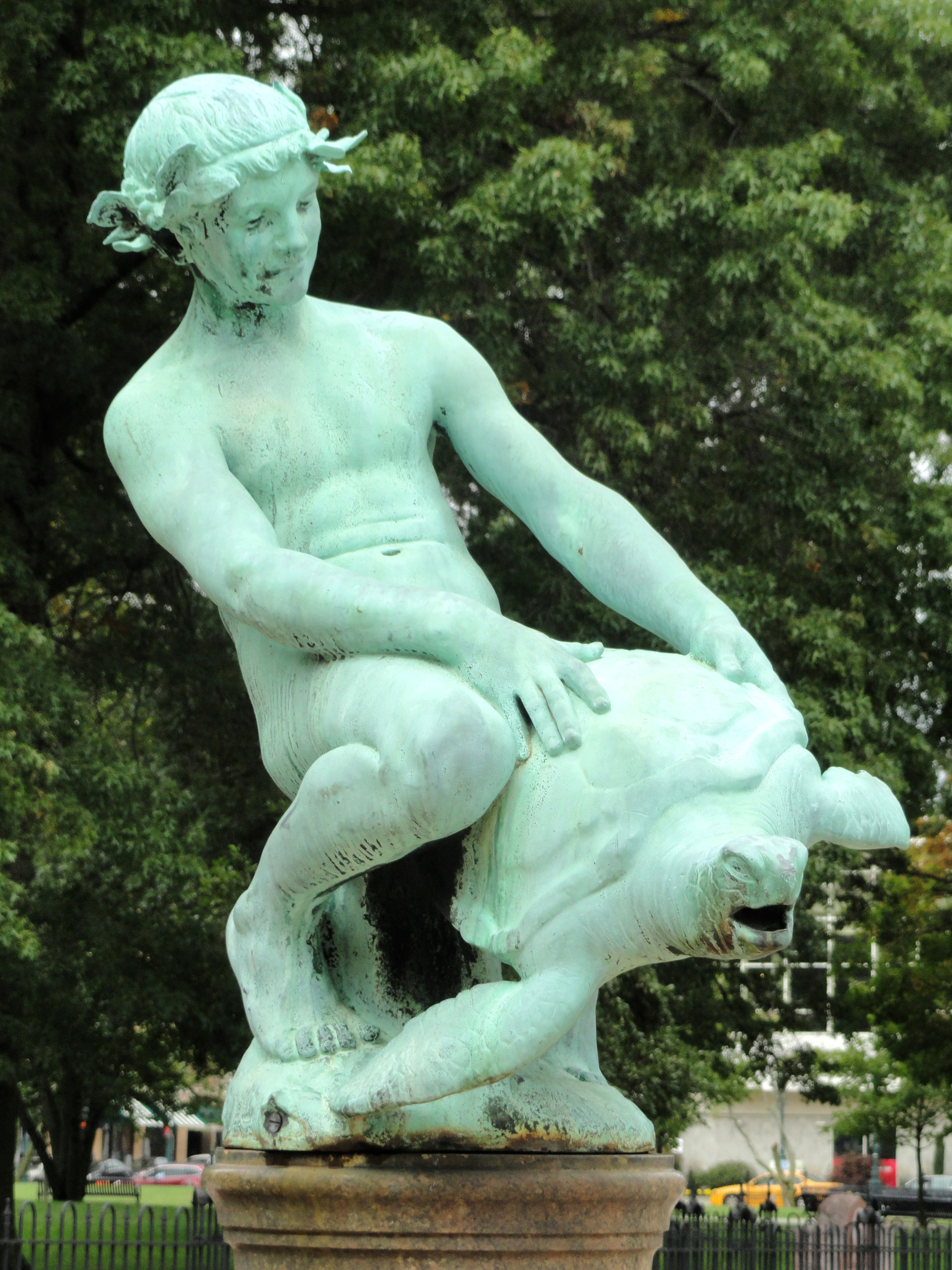
Boy with a Turtle showing its bright green patina, surface corrosion, and rust staining.

After Harvey's death, Sherry Fry, a fellow American Academy graduate, was invited to finish the work according to the original designs Harvey had laid out. Fry completed the sculpture and it was delivered along with the basin to Worcester in 1912. There had been much discussion about where to install the fountain. Central Square, just off the Worcester Common, was chosen with only slight opposition from "market gardeners who had been using the east end of the Common for their summer outdoor market." When it was installed in Central Square there was no dedication ceremony or unveiling for the fountain. A news article on October 11, 1912, stated that Worcester Mayor Philip O’Connell "believes it will be well to have the fountain placed in use without ceremony." This lack of a ceremony is presumably due to Harvey's suicide and the desire to not celebrate such an act.

By 1912, the use of horse and buggy had fallen out of fashion, and the Burnside Fountain saw little use in its intended purpose. By 1939, citizens of Worcester were already calling for the fountain to be moved to a more suitable place where it could be of more use. It took until 1969 for the Burnside Fountain to be moved from Central Square. It was relocated to the Worcester Common and turned to face Salem Square. One year later, in May 1970, the statue was ripped from its pedestal and stolen. It was returned later that same year, but it took until 1972 for the boy and turtle to be placed back on top of the basin. Another apparent theft attempt happened in 2004 when the bronze sculpture was toppled off its pedestal and left dangling off the basin. The city was quick to fix the statue this time, with its being righted and reattached within days.

In 2010, the Burnside Fountain was named one of WAAF's "Hill-Man's 25 Greatest Places in Massachusetts." That same year, it was also nominated for "Worst Public Art in New England" by a regional art blog. Around this same time, a small group of volunteers began the "Turtle Boy Urban Gardeners," a group dedicated to keeping the plantings around the Burnside Fountain presentable.

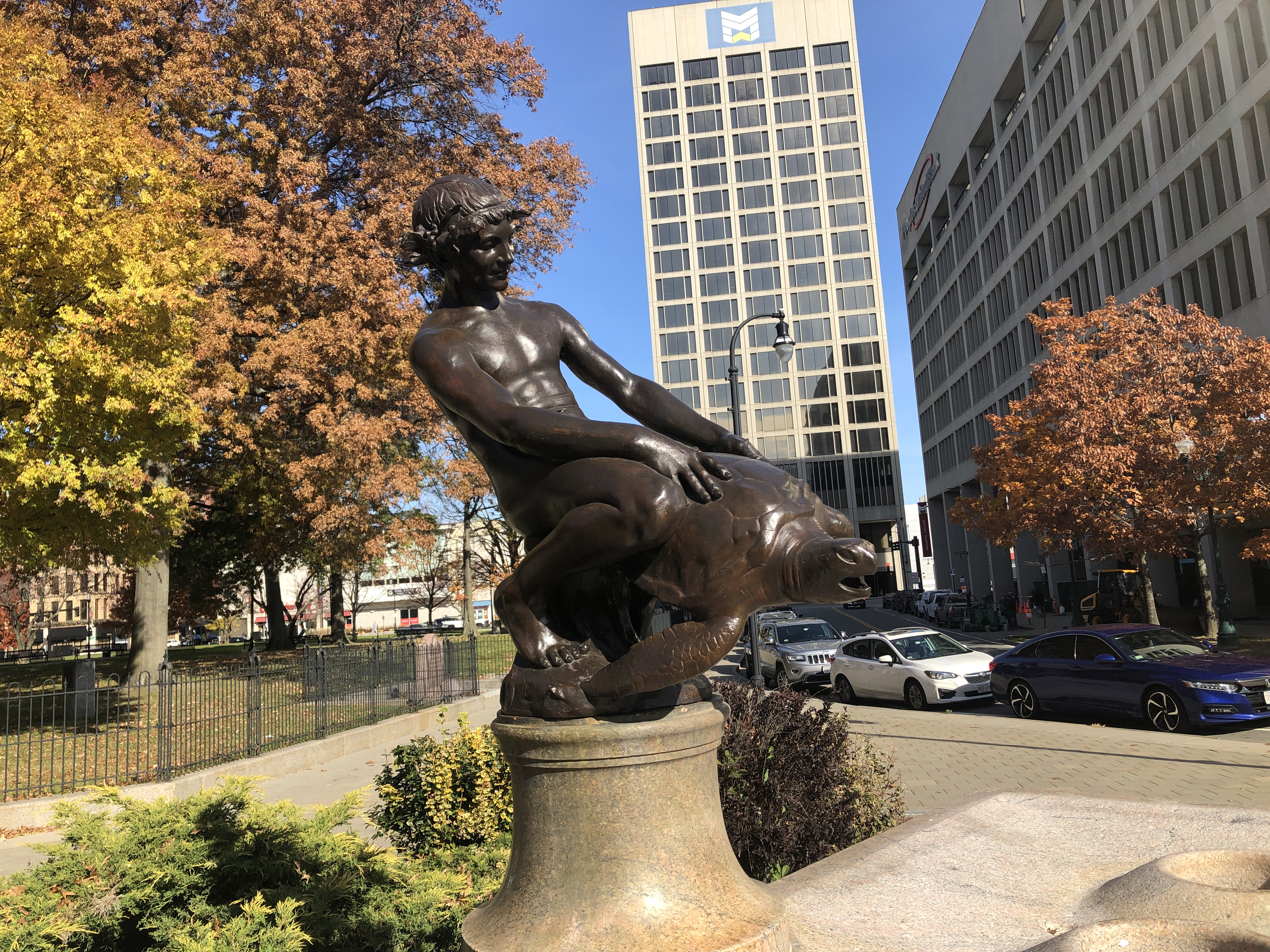
Boy with a Turtle after its restoration in 2021.

=== Condition ===
A 1986 inventory of public memorials in Worcester, compiled by the municipal parks and recreation department, listed the fountain's problems as "chipped stone, water system, bronze surface corrosion, rust staining, litter," and the Smithsonian Art Inventories Catalog surveyed the fountain in September 1994 and listed its condition as "treatment urgent."

Leading up to the 100th anniversary of the Burnside Fountain in 2012, there was renewed interest in restoring the fountain. Restoration estimates ranged from $40,000 to $60,000, which was more than the city was willing to spend. As of June 2012, there were no official plans to restore the fountain. In June 2021, the exterior of the fountain was treated for bronze corruption, restoring the original coloring.

== Turtle Boy ==
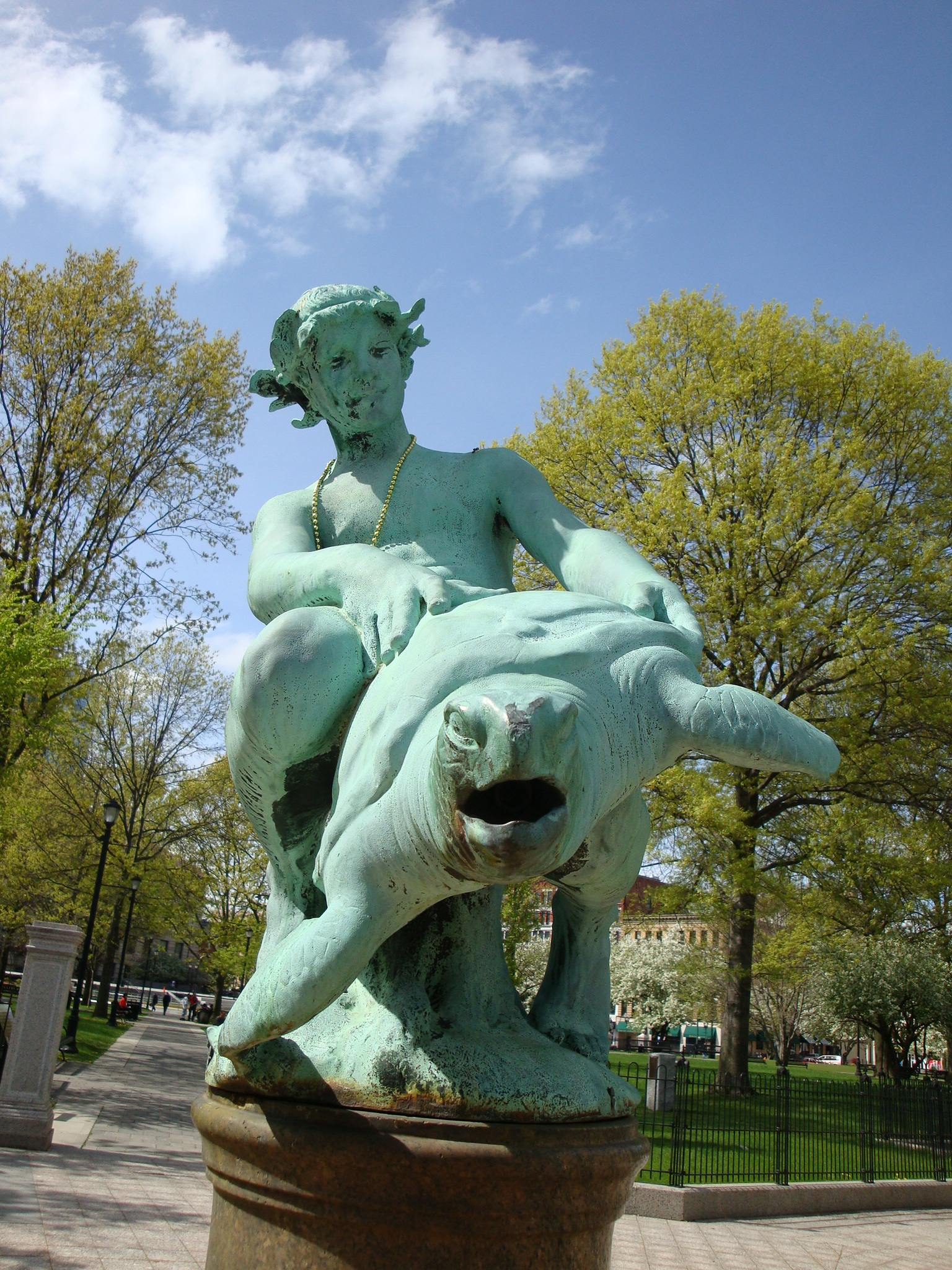
Turtle Boy wearing Mardi Gras beads

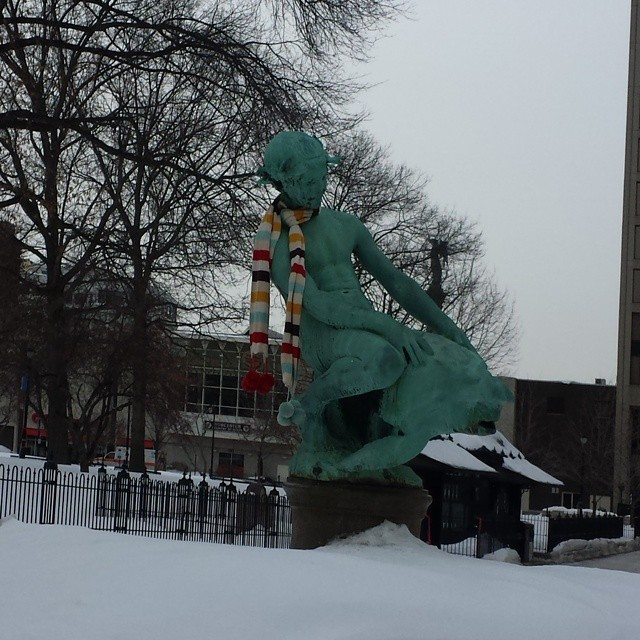
Turtle Boy wearing a winter scarf

The statue that sits atop the Burnside Fountain is now commonly referred to as Turtle Boy. In the tradition of Manneken Pis in Brussels, Turtle Boy has become an unofficial mascot for Worcester. Much of the local popularity of the statue is due to bawdy insinuations about how the boy and the turtle are portrayed. Anonymous members of the Worcester community sometimes dress the statue in festive clothes for holidays, local bands write crowd-pleasing songs about it, and the statue has even graced postcards of the city.

The popularity of Turtle Boy began around the time it was installed in Central Square. In 1916, the Burnside Fountain's boy and turtle appeared in The Cloud Bird, a children's book by Margaret C. Getchell in which each chapter was about a Worcester landmark. In the eighth chapter, "The Adventurer in Armor," a small girl finds a young, Peter Pan-like faun who had agreed to hold back the turtle. They later go on an adventure upon the turtle's back, but return at the end of the day. By the late 2000s, "Turtle Boy" was a common term used to align events and objects with Worcester. A local music contest was named the "Turtle Boy Music Awards," and the Wormtown Brewing Company in Worcester began selling a "Turtle Boy Blueberry Ale."

Kristina Wilson, associate professor in the Department of Visual and Performing Arts at Worcester's Clark University, asked people on campus what they thought of Turtle Boy. One person replied "Oh, that's Worcester's monument to bestiality." Wilson said the sculpture is intended to portray "innocence, joy, and rebirth," and that historically Charles Y. Harvey came from an artistic tradition in which "the human figure is the apex of beauty, and how well you can capture that is the demonstration of your artistic talents." Regarding the artistic merit of the work, Wilson said: "It's unfortunate, because it really does look like something untoward is going on."

Mostly because of the ambiguity in what the Burnside Fountain is depicting, Turtle Boy pops up occasionally in social media. The sculpture also appeared on comedian Daniel Tosh's Tosh.0 blog.

== See also ==
- Drinking fountains in the United States
- Aidan Kearney (journalist), known as Turtleboy, a nickname inspired by the fountain
