= List of tallest buildings in Worcester, Massachusetts =

This list of tallest buildings in Worcester, Massachusetts, ranks skyscrapers in the U.S. city of Worcester, Massachusetts, by height.

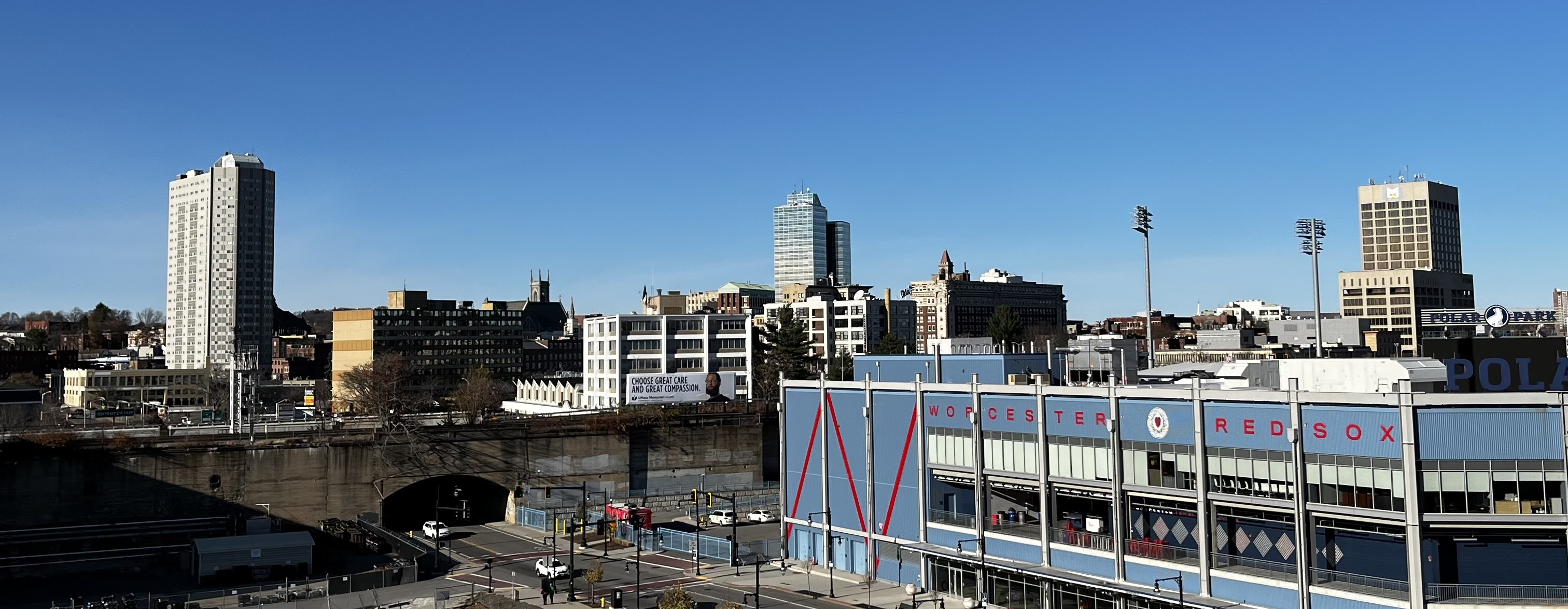
The Worcester skyline in November 2024

Worcester currently has 18 high-rise buildings. In the city, there are 12 buildings that stand taller than 150 feet (46 m). The two tallest structures in Worcester are the 24-story tower at 600 Main Street and Worcester Plaza, both of which rise 289 feet (88 m). The rest of the high rise buildings are between 150 and 110 ft tall.

== Tallest buildings ==
This lists ranks Worcester buildings that stand at least 150 feet (46 m) tall, based on standard height measurement. This includes spires and architectural details but does not include antenna masts. An equal sign (=) following a rank indicates the same height between two or more buildings. The "Year" column indicates the year in which a building was completed.

Rank	Name	Image	Address	Height ft (m)	Floors	Year	Coordinates	Primary Purpose	Notes
1=	The 6Hundred		600 Main Street	289 feet (88 m)	24	1991	42.260315°N 71.804919°W	Residential	
1=	Worcester Plaza		446 Main Street	289 feet (88 m)	24	1974	42.263281°N 71.803235°W	Office	
3	Mercantile Center		100 Front Street	226 feet (69 m)	20	1971	42.2626°N 71.7994°W	Office	
4	Belmont Tower Apartments		40 Belmont Street	216 feet (66 m) (estimate)	19	1972	42.271355°N 71.79595°W	Residential	
5	Worcester City Hall		455 Main Street	203 feet (62 m)	4	1898	42.262222°N 71.801667°W	Office	
6	Guaranty Bank Building		370 Main Street	187 feet (57 m)	12	1971	42.264805°N 71.802270°W	Office	Also known as the "Guaranty Building" and the "Guarantee Bank and Trust Building."
7	Plumley Village East Apartments		16 Laurel Street	179 feet (55 m) (estimate)	16	1972	42.269600°N 71.795381°W	Residential	
8	Union Station		2 Washington Square	175 feet (53 m)	3	1911	42.2612°N 71.7949°W	Transportation	
9	Lincoln Park Tower		11 Lake Avenue	171 feet (52 m) (estimate)	15		42.273086°N 71.757987°W	Residential	
10	Lincoln Village Apartments I		37 Pleasant Valley Drive	162 feet (49 m) (estimate)	15		42.297878°N 71.776086°W	Residential	Also known as "49 Pleasant Valley Drive," and built as part of the Lincoln Village Apartments development.
11	Webster Square Tower East		1050 Main Street	159 feet (48 m) (estimate)	14		42.246057°N 71.831409°W	Residential	Built as part of the Webster Square development.
12	Elm Park Tower		425 Pleasant Street	154 feet (47 m)	16	1977	42.263686°N 71.816142°W	Residential	

== Timeline of tallest buildings ==
Name	Image	Street address	Years as tallest	Height feet / m	Floors	Coordinates	Reference
Old Union Station		2 Washington Square	1875–1898	200 feet (61 m)		42.2612°N 71.7949°W	
Worcester City Hall		455 Main Street	1898–1971	203 feet (62 m)	4	42.262222°N 71.801667°W	
100 Front Street		100 Front Street	1971–1974	226 feet (69 m)	20	42.2626°N 71.7994°W	
Worcester Plaza		446 Main Street	1974–1991 (tied 1991–present)	289 feet (88 m)	24	42.263281°N 71.803235°W	
The 6Hundred		600 Main Street	tied 1991–Present	289 feet (88 m)	24	42.260315°N 71.804919°W	

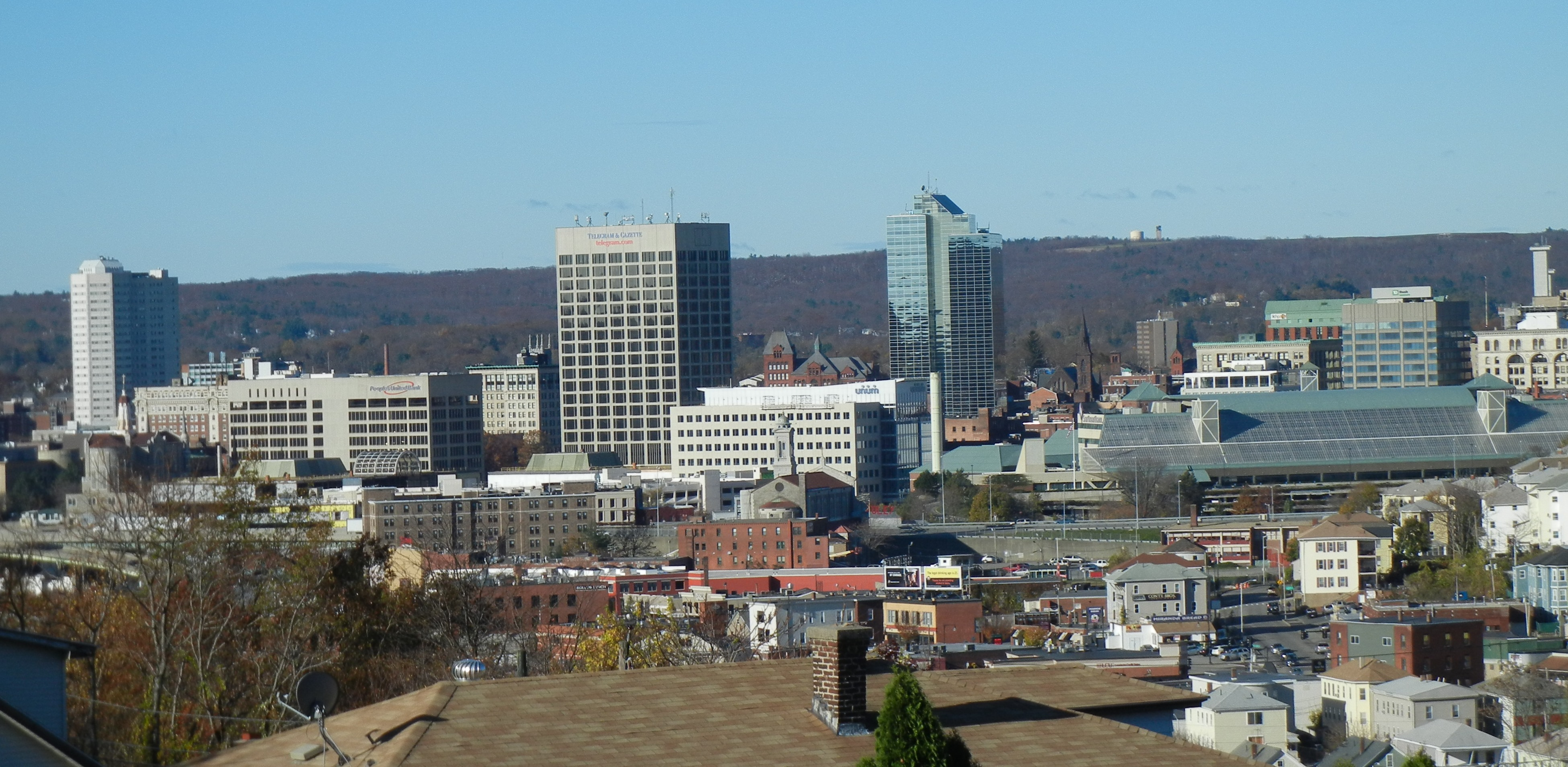
Worcester skyline

== See also ==
- List of tallest buildings in Boston
- List of tallest buildings in Cambridge, Massachusetts
- List of tallest buildings in Springfield, Massachusetts
- List of tallest buildings in Massachusetts outside of Boston
