= 100 Front Street =

Mercantile Center
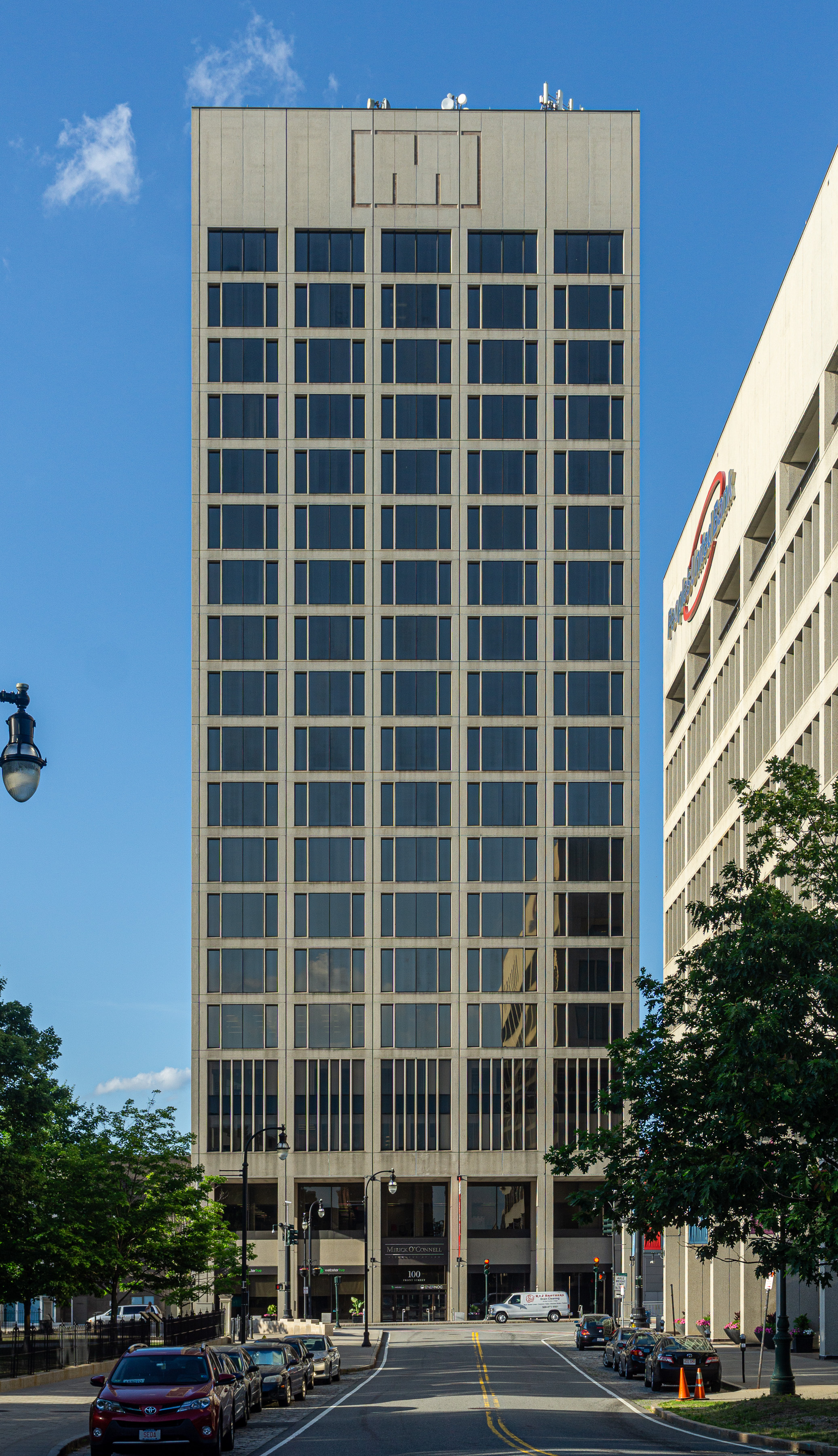
- Interactive map of the Mercantile Center area
- Former names: Mechanics National Bank Tower

General information
- Type: Commercial office
- Location: 100 Front Street, Worcester, Massachusetts
- Coordinates: 42.2626°N 71.7994°W
- Completed: 1971

Height
- Roof: 226 feet (69 m)

Technical details
- Floor count: 20
- Floor area: 280,000 sq ft (26,000 m^{2})

Design and construction
- Architect: Welton Becket and Associates
- Developer: Worcester Center Associates

Mercantile Center (originally Mechanics National Bank Tower) is a high-rise building located at 100 Front Street in Downtown Worcester, Massachusetts. The former Worcester Center complex, comprising 100 Front Street and the adjacent nine story tower at 120 Front Street were named Mercantile Center by its owner, Franklin Realty Advisors, in early 2016.

At 226 feet (69 m), the 20-story office tower is the third tallest building in Worcester (behind The 6Hundred and Worcester Plaza, both 288 feet (88 m) high). It was completed in 1971, as a part of the Worcester Center urban renewal project, and has 280,000 square feet (26,000 m^{2}) of interior space. The building's footprint is not square, but rectangular, with the short sides being 5 windows across, and the long sides being 7 windows across. The short sides still feature the Mechanics Bank "M" at the top of the façade above the top floor.

== Photo gallery ==
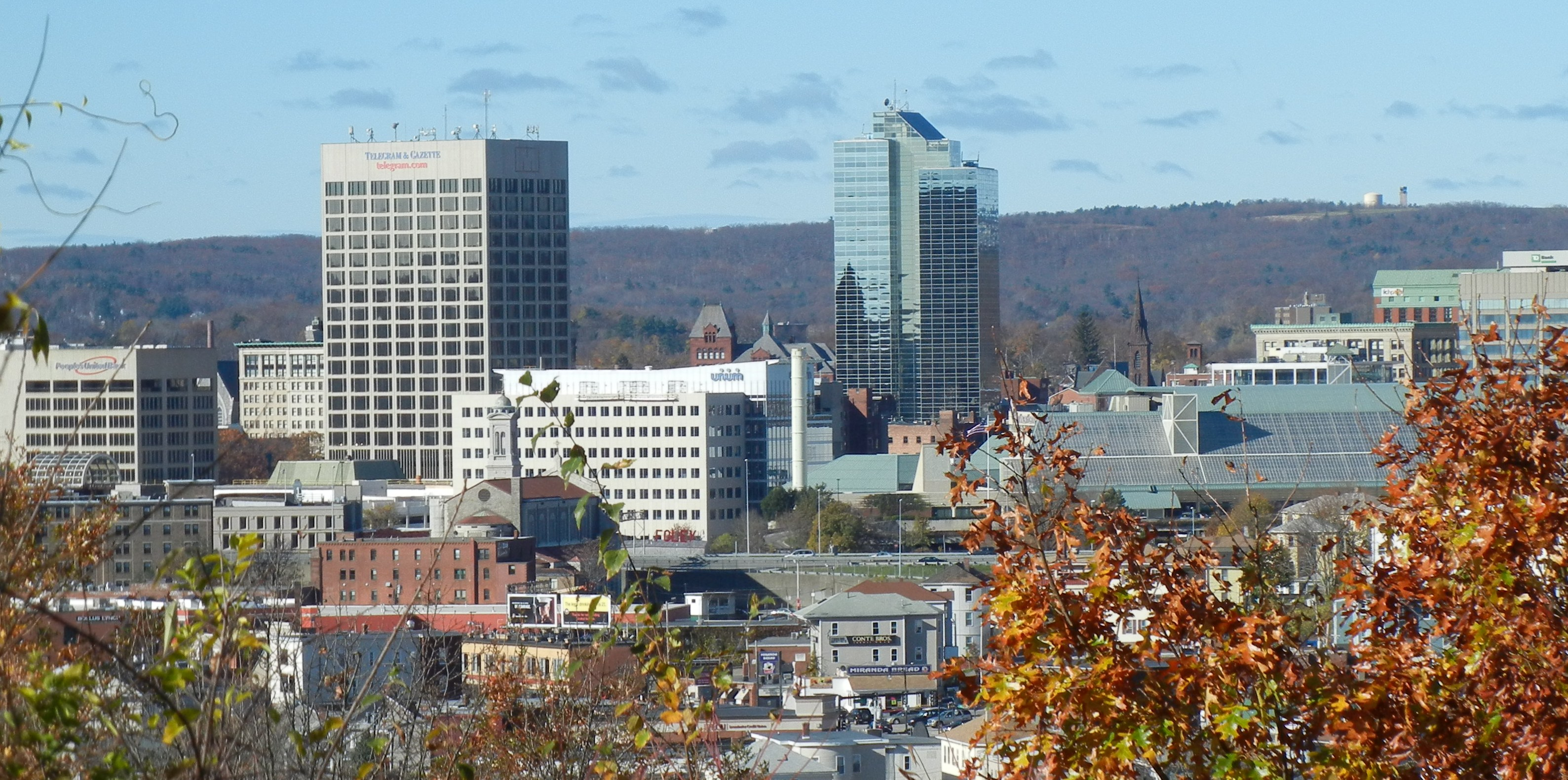
Worcester Skyline (2012)

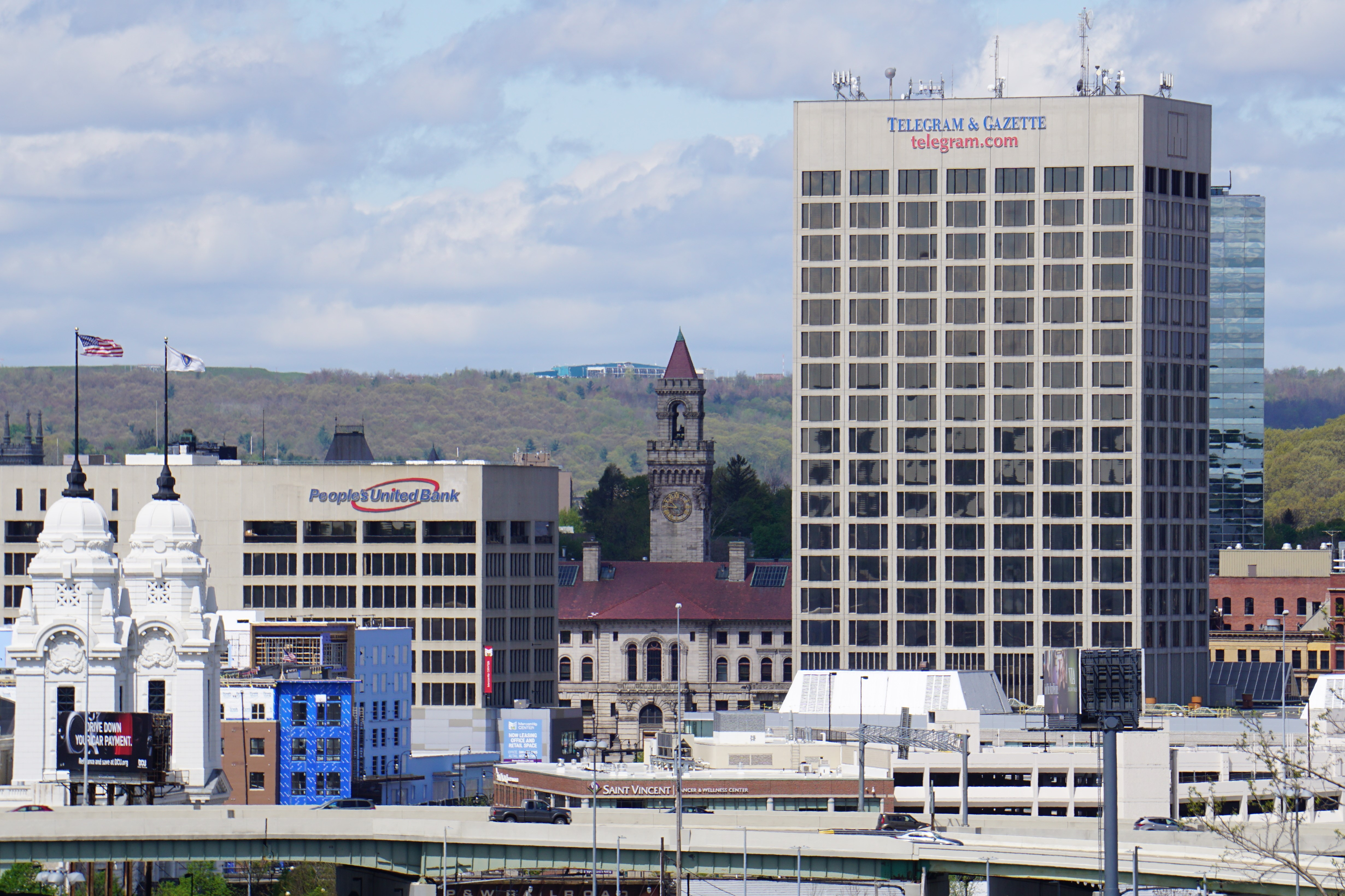
Mercantile Center (2017)

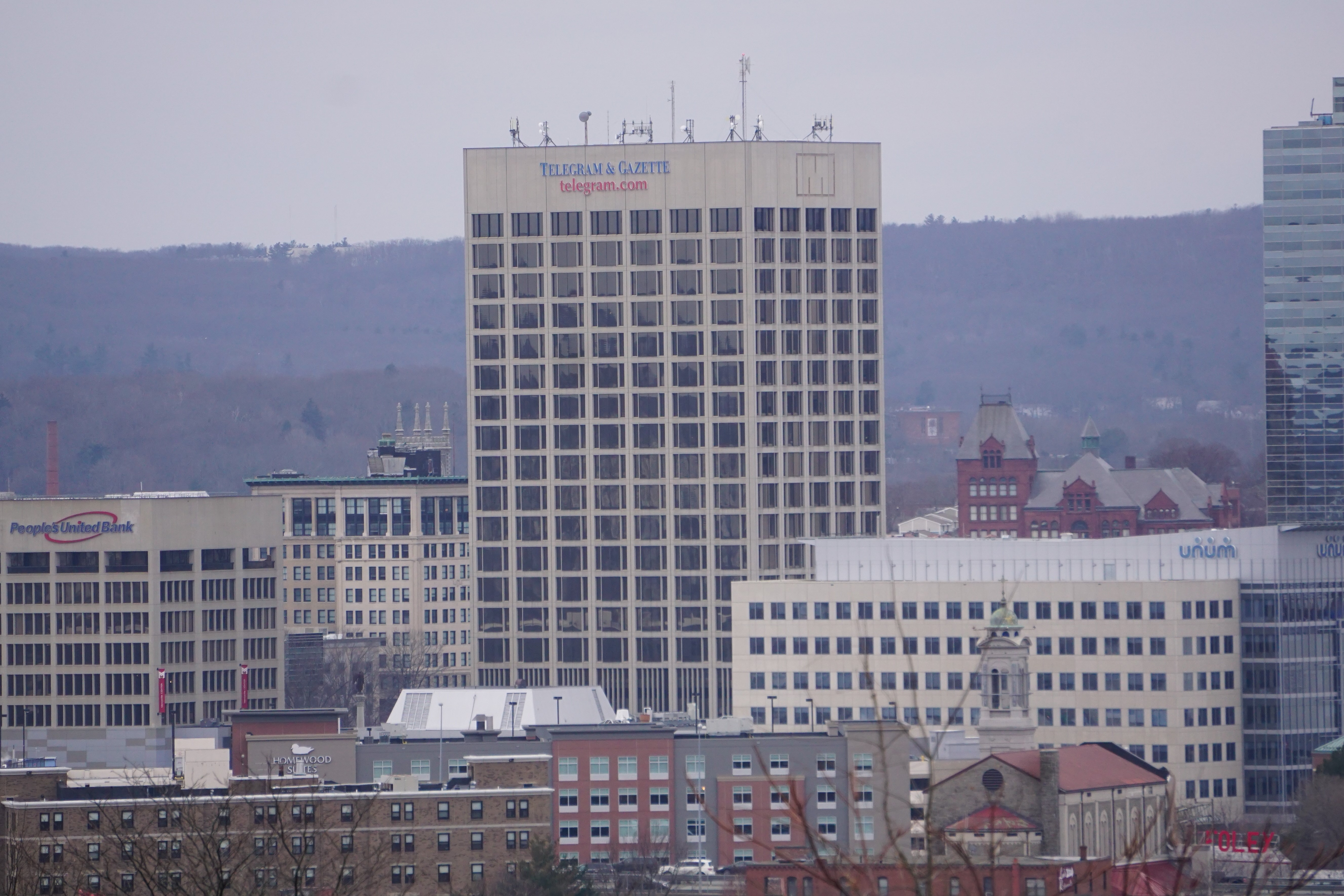
Mercantile Center (2018)

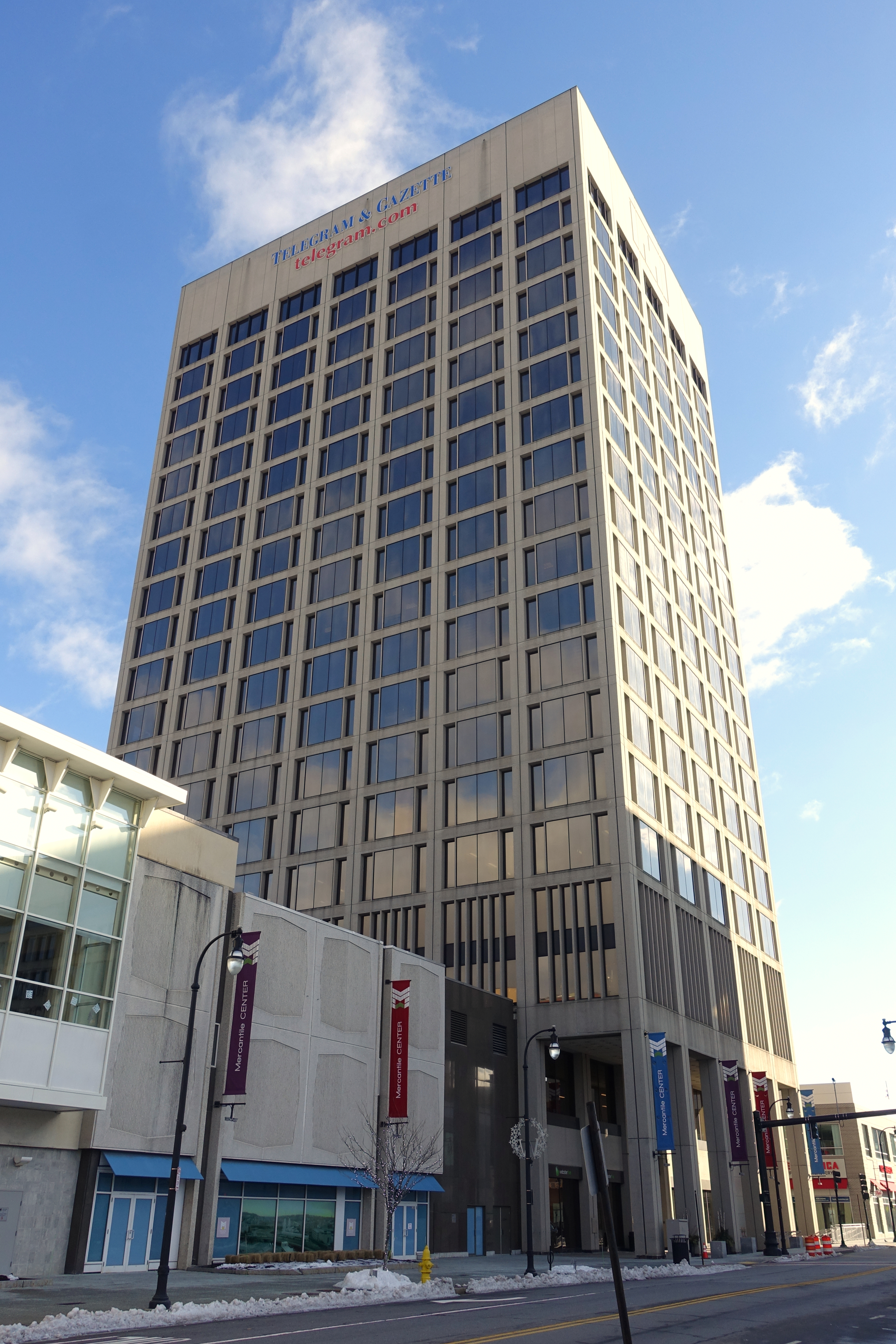
Mercantile Center (2020)

Preceded by Worcester City Hall	Tallest Building in Worcester; 1971—1974; 69m	Succeeded by Worcester Plaza
