= Levi Olan =

Jewish rabbi, activist and author (1903-1984)

Levi Olan

Levi Arthur Olan (March 22, 1903 – October 17, 1984) was an American Reform Jewish rabbi, liberal social activist, author, and professor. Born in Ukraine in 1903, he grew up in Rochester, New York and was ordained at Hebrew Union College in 1929. He served as rabbi of Temple Emanuel in Worcester, Massachusetts from 1929 to 1948, and Temple Emanu-El in Dallas, Texas from 1948 to his retirement in 1970. Olan was one of the most prominent liberal voices in Dallas, which was a predominantly conservative city. His views on poverty, war, civil rights, civil liberties and other topics were disseminated largely through his popular program on WFAA radio, and earned him the moniker, “the conscience of Dallas.” He also had a longstanding visiting professorship at Southern Methodist University and published numerous works on Judaism, process theology, and contemporary social issues.

== Childhood ==
Olan was born Lemel Olanovsky in 1903 in Moshny, Ukraine, near Cherkasy (then part of the Russian Empire). His family fled pogroms for the United States—Olan and his mother joining his father in Rochester, New York when he was three. Olan stated in an interview that his father "shortened the family name to Olan at the suggestion of an immigration officer at Ellis Island." They settled in a Jewish neighborhood, where Olan’s father began working as a peddlar, eventually opening a grocery and dry goods store. The family was observant and Yiddish speaking; Olan's father was treasurer at a Lubavitch synagogue.

As a child, Olan frequented Rochester’s Baden Street Settlement House. He participated in the debate team and—with friends and future rabbis Milton Steinberg and Sidney Regner—the Boys Literary Club, eventually becoming a club leader. He also joined Steinberg in studying after school at the neighborhood Talmud Torah school.

== Post-secondary education ==
At first, Olan was uninterested in a rabbinical career, preferring philosophy, history, or law. From 1921 to 1923, he attended the University of Rochester, where he was inspired by historian Lawrence Packard to become a history teacher, and where his exposure to the theory of evolution distanced him from his Orthodox upbringing. While playing basketball at the Unitarian Church one day, he was approached by the minister, who convinced him to talk to a Reform rabbi. The rabbi suggested Hebrew Union College in Cincinnati, Ohio, which appealed to Olan because his friend Regner was there, and because its free tuition, room and board would allow him to leave home.

At HUC, Olan chafed against an academic atmosphere in which “theoretical absolutes were handed to us.” He heckled teachers, and was threatened with expulsion for his “attitude.” His favorite class was on the prophets, relating them to contemporary issues such as the trial of Sacco and Vanzetti.

Olan completed his bachelor's degree at the University of Cincinnati in 1925, and was ordained as a rabbi by HUC in 1929.

== Worcester ==
Upon his ordination, Olan became rabbi of Temple Emanuel in Worcester, Massachusetts. Founded in 1920 as a Modern Orthodox synagogue, it gradually adopted Reform practices and, under Olan’s leadership, affiliated with the Reform movement in 1937.

At first there were conflicts between the more traditional congregation and the more modern rabbi, who inserted English into services and stated that one could be both a Jew and an atheist. By the time Olan left Worcester twenty years later, however, congregation and rabbi “had grown comfortable with one another.” One practice of his that the congregation supported was the trading of pulpits with Methodist, Baptist, Congregational, and Unitarian ministers.

Not satisfied only with his official rabbinical duties, Olan travelled to Harvard University and introduced himself to the renowned Jewish studies scholar Harry Wolfson. Wolfson recommended a course of independent study, and Olan began a lifelong habit of devoting mornings to scholarship and afternoons to his official duties. Some of the authors by whom he was most influenced were John Dewey, Friedrich Hegel, William James, Franz Rosenzweig, and Henri Bergson. At the same time, he studied the Babylonian Talmud, seeking connections between ancient and modern ideas.

== Dallas ==
In 1948, David Lefkowitz was retiring as rabbi of Dallas’ Reform Temple Emanu-El, the largest synagogue in Dallas and the second largest in Texas. The search committee was looking for an experienced rabbi who could be a liberal leader in the predominantly conservative city. Boston rabbi and best-selling author Joshua Liebman suggested Olan.

When Olan was offered the job, his liberal friends discouraged him. But he was encouraged by Nelson Glueck, president of Hebrew Union College, and Jacob Rader Marcus, founder of the American Jewish Archives. They thought Olan could play an important role in introducing some of the practices of Reform Judaism to the Southwest, a region with a growing Jewish population. And Olan welcomed the challenge of bringing liberal ideas to the conservative region. He took the job.

Olan differed from his predecessor in many respects. Lefkowitz specialized in ministering to the needs of individual congregants. Olan was more of a preacher and scholar, focused on challenging the congregation as a group. His imposing voice and presence belied his short physical stature. He was known for his intellectually and morally challenging sermons, but was also an inveterate trader of jokes.

Olan felt that many aspects of temple life—worship, education, social activities—were too assimilationist and secular, and worked to reintroduce a more serious focus on Jewish tradition. For example, he introduced more Hebrew into the almost exclusively English-language services. And he introduced Zionism into a congregation with many anti-Zionist members. When several hundred disgruntled congregants called a meeting with Olan to air their complaints, he replied, according to his oral history, “‘I was brought down here to be the rabbi. If you're going to tell the rabbi what Judaism is then you don't need him. It's supposed to work the other way. He's supposed to tell you what Judaism is.’ And I said goodnight and went home. I never had another peep out of them.”

One of Olan’s most popular activities at Temple Emanu-El was the Significant Book lecture series. His first lecture was attended by 900 people, and the series continued after his retirement.

During his tenure in Dallas, Olan delivered his sermons on the Temple Emanu-El radio program. Recordings of the broadcasts and the corresponding typescript sermon texts distributed by the Temple Brotherhood, dating from 1961 to 1970, are preserved at the Bridwell Library at Southern Methodist University.

At Southern Methodist University’s Perkins School of Theology, Olan continued the scholarly pursuits he had begun at Harvard. As visiting professor of contemporary Judaism, he spent every morning at Perkins. His favorite haunt was the library; when a new one was built in 1951, he was its first—and became its most prolific—patron. At his carrell during the mornings, and afterward at a neighborhood lunch spot, he became a valued source of counsel and discussion in the fields of academia, politics, and culture, befriending the likes of Neiman Marcus president Stanley Marcus, theologians Albert Outler and Schubert Ogden, soon-to-be federal judge Irving Goldberg, soon-to-be civil rights leader Zan Wesley Holmes Jr., and his best friend, Perkins library director Decherd Turner.

Olan served on the University of Texas Board of Regents from 1963 to 1969, and served as president of the Central Conference of American Rabbis from 1967 to 1969. He was a founding member of Colophon, Southern Methodist University's Friends of SMU Libraries organization.

The sanctuary at Temple Emanu-El in Dallas was rededicated as the Olan Sanctuary in 1990.

== Activism ==
Olan inherited from Lefkowitz a Sunday morning, half-hour radio program on WFAA. Under Olan, the show became a platform for his controversial, liberal views on current events, reaching 200,000 listeners. Through the program, he addressed issues of poverty, civil rights, anti-Semitism, McCarthyism, the Vietnam War, the nuclear arms race, evolution, and the assassination of President Kennedy in Dallas. He became popularly known as “the conscience of Dallas.”

Olan was one of the few whites who publicly opposed racism in Dallas during the 1950s. Some of his earliest radio broadcasts expressed his shock at segregation, his endorsement of federal public housing for Dallas, and his conviction that racism was against the teachings of the Bible. Olan delivered guest sermons at Good Street Baptist Church, and became a friend and ally to the pastors there. He joined Dallas Citizens for Peaceful Integration, and advocated for school integration when Dallas defied the Supreme Court-mandated desegregation of public schools in 1954. In 1967, he convinced African American leaders to unite behind a single African American school board candidate, who won and served on the board for a decade. Because of these activities, he received hate mail, his house was vandalized, and Temple Emanu-El received a bomb threat.

January 4, 1963: Olan joined the Rev. Dr. Martin Luther King Jr. at a poll tax rally at the Fair Park Auditorium in Dallas.

Olan was also one of the few white members of the Dallas County United Poll Tax Committee, which opposed the $1.75 poll tax as a vestige of post-Reconstruction Era racism. On January 4, 1963, Olan joined the Rev. Dr. Martin Luther King Jr. at a poll tax rally at the Fair Park Auditorium.

Olan also spoke out against the Red Scare. He was one of the few members of the Southern Methodist University and Dallas communities to publicly criticize SMU English Department chair John O. Beaty when he published the anti-communist, anti-Semitic The Iron Curtain Over America in 1951. The administration of university president Umphrey Lee refused to rebuke Beaty. Gradually, however, a movement against Beaty grew, until, in 1954, the faculty condemned him, a new university president confronted him, and his political activities waned.

Olan was a charter member of the Dallas branch of the ACLU. He fought against a campaign to ban suspected communist artists’ works from the Dallas Museum of Art—a campaign that succeeded for an eight-month period in 1955. As a founding member of the Friends of the Dallas Public Library, he fought for the library to go ahead with plans to place an abstract sculpture in the lobby of its new building in 1955 despite public suspicion of the sculpture’s artistic and political meaning. He even fought for the name “Friends of the Dallas Public Library” against a member who accused it of sounding too communist.

When President John F. Kennedy was assassinated in Dallas in 1963, Olan used his sermons and radio broadcasts to accuse the city of complicity due to the popular stream of vitriol aimed at Kennedy prior to his visit. He was appointed to serve on the Citizens Memorial to JFK Committee, which raised funds for a memorial that was finally constructed in 1970.

== Retirement and Scholarship ==
After retiring in 1970, Olan devoted more time to scholarship. He was a visiting professor at Leo Baeck College in London, and continued teaching at SMU as well as other Dallas area universities. He produced three books during his retirement: Judaism and Immortality; Maturity in an Immature World, a compilation of his radio sermons; and Prophetic Faith and the Secular Age.

Olan's interest in process philosophy led him to befriend Charles Hartshorne, and he was one of the first authors to apply process philosophy to Jewish theology.

Olan married Sarita Messer, daughter of Frank Messer, founder of Cincinnati-based construction company Frank Messer & Sons (now Messer Construction), and sister of the actor Robert Middleton. They had three children, including the composer David Olan.

== Publications ==
- On the Nature of Man... Reprinted from Yearbook, Vol. LVIII, The Central Conference of American Rabbis, 1948.
- With All Our Hearts. Cincinnati: Union of American Hebrew Congregations, 1949.
- The Faith of an Untired Liberal. Buffalo: International Association of Torch Clubs, 1949.
- Rethinking the Liberal Faith. Cincinnati: Hebrew Union College Press, [1949?].
- Felix Adler: Critic of Judaism and Founder of a Movement. New York: Union of American Hebrew Congregations, 1951.
- Judaism, A Religion of Realistic Hope for Man. Commencement address at the Hebrew Union College-Jewish Institute of Religion, Cincinnati, June 7, 1953.
- “Libraries and censorship.” Texas Library Journal, vol. 30, no, 2 (June 1954).
- “Coercion Does Not Work.” In Best Jewish Sermons of 5715-5716, Saul I. Teplitz. New York: Jonathan David Co., 1956.
- Judaism and Modern Theology. Reprinted from the Central Conference of American Rabbis, Annual convention, vol. 66, 1956.
- “Reinhold Niebuhr and the Hebraic Spirit; A Critical Inquiry.” Judaism, vol. 5, no. 2 (Spring 1956).
- “Who is a Jew? A Symposium.” Judaism, vol. 8, no. 1 (Winter 1959).
- The Stone Which the Modern Builders Rejected. Cincinnati: Hebrew Union College Press, 1960.
- New Resources for a Liberal Faith. Philadelphia: Maurice Jacobs, 1962.
- The Lawyer in a Free Society. Austin, 1963. Address before the Bar Advisory Council in Austin on May 25, 1963.
- “New Presences.” CCAR Yearbook, 1963. Also in Martin, Contemporary Reform Jewish Thought.
- “The Nature of Man.” In Great Jewish Ideas. Abraham Ezra Millgram. Washington: B'nai B'rith Dept. of Adult Jewish Education, 1964.
- “The University and Man's Condition.” Southwest Review, vol. 49, no. 1 (Winter 1964).
- Freedom and Responsibility. Reprinted from the Central Conference of American Rabbis, Annual convention, vol. 75, 1965.
- “An Unrepentant Liberal Jew.” In Varieties of Jewish Belief. Ira Eisenstein. New York: Reconstructionist Press, 1966.
- “A new Evaluation of Rabbinical Seminaries.” Reprinted from the Central Conference of American Rabbis, Annual convention, vol. 76, 1967.
- “Promise and Fulfillment.” Dartmouth Medical School Quarterly, vol. 4, no. 2, 1967.
- “Aspirations of Ethnic Minorities.” In National Conference on Social Welfare. New York: Columbia University Press, 1971.
- Judaism and Immortality. New York: Union of American Hebrew Congregations, 1971.
- “Christian Jewish Dialogue: A Dissenting Opinion.” Nashville: Abingdon, 1972. Offprint from Religion in Life, 1972.
- A Rational Faith: Essays in Honor of Levi A. Olan. Levi Arthur Olan; Jack Bemporad. New York: Ktav Publishing House, 1977.
- Prophetic Faith and the Secular Age. New York: Ktav Publishing House; Dallas: Institute of Jewish Studies, 1982.
- “The sermons of Rabbi Levi Olan,” New York Public Library.

== See also ==
- Jewish principles of faith
