= Steven A. Fox =

American Reform rabbi

- Born: California
- Occupation: Rabbi
- Spouse: Vicki Reikes Fox

Steven A. Fox is an American Reform rabbi. He is the Chief Executive Emeritus of the Central Conference of American Rabbis, the largest and oldest rabbinical organization in North America.

== Early life and education ==
Fox was born in Southern California to David and Senta Fox. He attended Temple Beth Tikvah, where he served as youth group president. He was later president of the Southern California Federation of Temple Youth. He graduated from Sunny Hills High School in Fullerton, California in 1972. He received a B.A. from California State University, Fullerton in 1975 and an M.A. from Hebrew Union College in 1978.

== Career ==
He was ordained at Hebrew Union College-Jewish Institute of Religion in 1980. His early rabbinic assignments included service at Temple Emanuel in Worcester, Massachusetts and Temple Isaiah in Lexington, Massachusetts. He later served as an adjunct rabbi of Temple Isaiah in Los Angeles.

Rabbi Fox earned his Juris Doctor degree at Northeastern University in 1985 and was an attorney and managing partner in a Los Angeles based law firm. Rabbi Fox advised religious and secular non-profits, rabbis and cantors, congregations and other Jewish organizations on a variety of issues.

In 2006 Fox was appointed Executive Vice President of CCAR. His title was later changed to Chief Executive Officer.

== Views ==
- Politics and the pulpit re: Israel: “It is more important that rabbis should speak about Israel. I also think there is an obligation for the rabbi to speak about the severity of the discourse surrounding this. We need to learn how to respect the diversity of views in the American Jewish community and the American community.”
- Gay marriage rights: Fox notes that Reform Jews and their rabbis "have long been part of the struggle for gay rights, and that includes advocacy for marriage equality."
- Recognition of Reform Judaism in Israel: Fox has expressed disappointment with Prime Minister Benjamin Netanyahu for not responding more forcefully to attacks on Reform Judaism made by members of his cabinet. Fox said the next priority for the Reform movement in Israel would be achieving parity in government allocations with Orthodox religious establishments and schools.

== Personal ==
Fox is married to Vicki Reikes Fox and they have two grown children.
