= Beth Israel Congregation (Jackson, Mississippi) =

Reform Jewish Synagogue in Jackson, US

- Hebrew: בית ישראל
- Location in Mississippi Beth Israel Congregation (Jackson, Mississippi) (the United States)

Religion
- Affiliation: Reform Judaism
- Ecclesiastical or organisational status: Synagogue
- Leadership: Rabbi Joseph Rosen
- Status: Active

Location
- Location: 5315 Old Canton Road, Jackson, Mississippi 39211
- Country: United States
- Coordinates: 32°22′11″N 90°07′57″W

Architecture
- Architect: Joseph Willis (1875)
- Type: Synagogue
- Style: Gothic Revival (1875)
- Established: 1861 (as a congregation)
- Completed: 1867 (South State and South #1); 1875 (South State and South #2); 1941 (East Woodrow Wilson Ave.); 1967 (Old Canton Road)

Website
- bethisraelms.org

Beth Israel Congregation (Hebrew: בית ישראל) is a Reform Jewish congregation and synagogue located at 5315 Old Canton Road in Jackson, Mississippi, United States. Organized in 1860 by Jews of German background, it is the only Jewish synagogue in Jackson. Beth Israel built the first synagogue in Mississippi in 1867, and, after it burned down, its 1874 replacement was at one time the oldest religious building in Jackson.

Originally Orthodox, the congregation joined the Union of American Hebrew Congregations in 1874. After going through a series of rabbis, and periods without one, the congregation hired Meyer Lovitt as rabbi in 1929; he would remain until 1954. The congregation moved to a new building in 1941.

Dr. Perry Nussbaum, Beth Israel's rabbi from 1954 to 1973, was active in the Civil Rights Movement. In 1967, the congregation moved to a new synagogue building, and both the new building and Nussbaum's house were bombed by the Ku Klux Klan that year. In 2003, Valerie Cohen became the congregation's first female rabbi. Rabbi Rosen began at Beth Israel Congregation in July 2019. With a growing membership of over 200 families, Beth Israel was the largest Jewish congregation in the state.

== Early years ==
The congregation was originally established in 1860 by Jews of German background. Its primary purpose was to create a Jewish cemetery, which it immediately did, on State Street. In November 1862, the congregation hired a Mr. Oberndorfer as cantor; its next goal was provide a Jewish education for the congregation's children. At the time Jackson had 15 Jewish families.

A number of accounts state that the congregation's first synagogue was built at South State and South streets in 1861 and burned by the Union Army in 1863, but the veracity of the latter claim is disputed. That year the congregation had 31 members, and adopted its first constitution. In 1867, the congregation constructed a wood frame building at the corner of South State and South streets. The building, which was used both as a schoolhouse and for prayer services, was the first synagogue in Mississippi.

From the start the congregation was not unified. However, as there were only about 50 Jews in Jackson in 1868, the community was too small for two synagogues. Conflicts arose between the older German Jewish members and post-American Civil War Jewish immigrants from Poland, particularly over synagogue ritual. The synagogue followed the Orthodox nusach Ashkenaz, but some members wanted to adopt Isaac Mayer Wise's reformist Minhag America Prayer-Book.

Tensions eased when Beth Israel hired its first Rabbi, the Reverend L. Winter, in 1870. He moved the congregation towards Reform Judaism, replacing Saturday services with Friday night ones, giving sermons in English, and adding confirmation ceremonies. Winter, however, left soon afterward.

Beth Israel's building burned down in July 1874, and was replaced by a stone and brick building at the same location. Dedicated in 1875, the two-story brick Gothic Revival structure had "pointed-arch windows", and an auditorium on the second floor that was accessed via two curved staircases. The architect, Joseph Willis, had previously designed or remodeled several significant buildings in Mississippi, including the Old Mississippi State Capitol. In later years one straight staircase replaced the two curved ones, and the exposed brick walls were covered by stucco.

In 1875, Beth Israel also formalized its move to Reform by joining the Union of American Hebrew Congregations (now Union for Reform Judaism).

== First half of the 20th century ==
Following its founding the congregation grew very slowly; by 1908 there were still only 37 members, and 16 children in the religious school. By 1918, membership had fallen to 24, and children in the religious school to 10. That year the synagogue's total income was $800 (today $17,100).

In the first decades of the 20th century, the neighborhood around the South State Street building transitioned to industrial use. To accommodate members who had moved away from Jackson's downtown, in 1940 the congregation commenced construction of a new building at 546 East Woodrow Wilson Avenue (west of State Street), while holding services at Galloway Memorial Methodist Church. The congregation moved into the new building in 1941, and dedicated it in January 1942. The sanctuary had solid walnut pews that sat 300. Beth Israel's old building at South State and South streets was demolished; at the time of the move, it was the oldest building used for religious purposes in Jackson. In 2005, a historical marker was placed at the location by the State of Mississippi, commemorating the original Beth Israel synagogue buildings.

In its first few decades Beth Israel went through a number of rabbis, whose tenures were all short-lived, and endured many periods without any rabbi at all. One rabbi, Louis Schreiber, was hired in 1915, and fired the next year, for "grossly insulting and hurting the feelings of Beth Israel members". In 1929 the congregation hired Meyer Lovitt as rabbi, and with him Beth Israel achieved a measure of stability. By 1939, the synagogue had 72 members, out of a total Jewish population in Jackson of around 250.

Lovitt was non-confrontational, and avoided getting involved in issues relating to the civil rights movement. He minimized the differences between Christianity and Judaism, and viewed assimilation positively. He preferred that the congregation celebrate the Jewish holidays in ways that attracted no attention, and had no objection to members putting up Christmas trees, which he referred to as "Hanukkah bushes." Lovitt would remain with Beth Israel until his retirement in 1954.

== Perry Nussbaum era ==
In 1954, Lovitt was succeeded by Dr. Perry Nussbaum. Born in Toronto in 1908 and raised there, Nussbaum had attended a small Orthodox synagogue as a boy, and, after high school, worked as secretary for the Holy Blossom Temple's rabbi Barnett R. Brickner. With encouragement from Brickner, in 1926 he applied and was accepted into a combined eight-year rabbinic ordination and degree program at Hebrew Union College in Cincinnati and University of Cincinnati. He graduated in 1933, Hebrew Union College's first Canadian graduate. He was the last member of his class to receive an offer of a position, so he had to accept as his first rabbinic posting a role at a Reform synagogue in Melbourne. This did not work out, as he was too inexperienced. Nussbaum subsequently served at a synagogue in Amarillo, Texas, and in 1937 accepted a position as a prison chaplain in Pueblo, Colorado, where he also worked as a part-time librarian at the local university, and taught public speaking. In 1941, he became rabbi of Temple Emanu-El in Wichita, Kansas, and in 1943 he joined the Chaplain Corps of the United States Army. He served in the Philippines, and eventually became a colonel in the United States Army Reserve.

After the war, he was assistant rabbi at a synagogue in Trenton, New Jersey (a position several other rabbis had rejected). Finding that the rabbi there wanted a secretary, not an assistant, Nussbaum resigned after less than a year, and moved to Temple Emanu-el of Long Beach, New York. He found the position there extremely political, and after three years became rabbi of Temple Anshe Amunim in Pittsfield, Massachusetts. After Lovitt retired from Beth Israel, the chair of the Central Conference of American Rabbis (and former classmate and friend), Rabbi Nathan Perilman, recommended the post to Nussbaum. Perilman stated the congregation was wonderful, and would respect and appreciate him. He also lauded the city of Jackson. Looking for stability, and some "rest and relaxation", Nussbaum interviewed for the role; the search committee's first question to him was "Doctor, what's your position on school desegregation?" He replied that he was a liberal, but was careful not to get his congregants into trouble. Though the committee was concerned about his liberalism, they offered him the role, which he accepted, resigning from Temple Anshe Anusim.

Nussbaum had a forceful personality, and was outspoken and not particularly tactful; some congregants remembered him decades after he retired as "headstrong" and "abrasive". He was a good educator, speaker, and pastor, and had a particular knack for composing original prayers. Nussbaum found Beth Israel's membership highly assimilated, and, in his view, some congregants were "anti-Hebrew, anti-Israel, anti-everything!" He criticized members who put up Christmas trees (a large proportion did), and slowly re-introduced Jewish rituals such as bar mitzvahs to the congregation's practice. He also developed an annual educational program for adults, and added Hebrew studies.

Nussbaum supported Zionism and Israel, causes which his congregants typically publicly avoided. Upon arriving at Beth Israel he discovered that some of his richest members were supporters of the anti-Zionist American Council for Judaism, and he immediately prohibited them from meeting in the synagogue's premises, which, according to Nussbaum, "left its scars". He openly declared that Judaism was a religion distinct from Christianity, rather than just an Old Testament version of it. In 1955, Nussbaum organized the Mississippi Assembly of Jewish Congregations, which had representatives from all twenty-five of Mississippi's synagogues, and was elected its president. He was always keen on ecumenical work, but discovered that rabbis were excluded from the Jackson Ministerial Association, which was Protestant-only. He instead helped found the Jackson Interfaith Fellowship.

Following the bombing of the Hebrew Benevolent Congregation Temple in 1958, Nussbaum wrote an article in Beth Israel's bulletin titled "It Can Happen Here", in which he expressed the view that such a bombing was quite possible in Jackson. A copy of the article was reprinted in Jackson's secular press, and raised considerable opposition amongst Jackson's leadership. This in turn led to Nussbaum's first battle with his congregation; at the next board meeting it was proposed that Nussbaum be required to clear all public statements with the board before making them. The rabbi's supporters were able to defeat the resolution, but the attempt shook Nussbaum, though he did not end his activism. In 1961, Nussbaum provided considerable support to the early Freedom Riders imprisoned in Mississippi jails, and in 1966 Nussbaum began sponsoring annual "Clergy Institutes" at Beth Israel, to which he invited local black ministers.

=== Bombings ===
As tensions in the Southern United States heightened over the civil rights movement, the Jews of Jackson came under threat, being targeted by both the Ku Klux Klan (KKK) and the Americans for the Preservation of the White Race (APWR). The latter set up a booth at Jackson's state fair selling antisemitic literature, and Samuel Bowers, the KKK's Imperial Wizard in Mississippi, ordered attacks on both the synagogue and Nussbaum. The position of Beth Israel's membership in Jackson was not secure; according to Murray Polner, writing in 1977,

Judaism may rank higher in the moral order of the Bible Belt fundamentalists than, say, Black Christianity or Roman Catholicism, but it remains nonetheless a less–than–equal sect, and extraneous and foreign religion in an area of xenophobes.

Jews were unofficially excluded from membership in the Jackson Country Club, and the congregants were used to "customary slights and indignities" from Jackson's predominantly white, evangelical, Protestant community.

In 1967, the congregation moved to its current location, a building on Old Canton Road described by journalist Jack Nelson as "an octagonal structure dominated by a massive roof". At the dedication in March of that year, both black and white ministers participated. On September 18, 1967, the new building was wrecked by a dynamite bomb placed by Klan members in a recessed doorway. According to Nelson, the explosion had "ripped through administrative offices and a conference room, torn a hole in the ceiling, blown out windows, ruptured a water pipe and buckled a wall." The bomb caused $25,000 (today $240,000) worth of damage.

Three days later, the Greater Jackson Clergy Alliance "expressed their sorrow and support for the Jewish community" by organizing a "Walk of Penance". The Alliance, which had been formed two months earlier, comprised 60 clergy from 10 denominations, "the first racially integrated association of Protestants, Catholics, and Jews in Mississippi." Nussbaum had helped found it, merging into it the Jackson Interfaith Fellowship. The Reverend Thomas Tiller, the Alliance president, stated that "by default, we may have contributed to a climate of opinion which gives rise to terrorism. What concerns us, and others like us, is that we may not have been zealous enough in protecting our God-given freedoms." Despite this show of solidarity, and a reward offered of several thousand dollars, the perpetrators were not unearthed.

In November of that year, the same group planted a bomb that blew out the front of Nussbaum's house, while he and his wife were asleep inside. Nussbaum blamed the bombings on local antisemitism and bigotry, but most of his congregation blamed it on Nussbaum's anti-segregationist activism. Though the congregation officially supported him, a number of members privately urged him to leave Beth Israel and find another pulpit. The synagogue's board of trustees voted to prohibit non-Jewish groups from using the synagogue's premises unless they had prior approval from the board; the intent was to put an end to the interracial meetings that Nussbaum held there.

In the wake of the bombings, Nussbaum wanted to leave Jackson, but as a 60-year-old rabbi was unable to find another posting. He stayed at Beth Israel until his retirement in 1973, when he and his wife moved to San Diego.

== Late 20th and 21st centuries ==
After Nussbaum's retirement, Beth Israel hired Richard Birnholz as rabbi. Birnholz was ordained at Hebrew Union College in 1971, and had served from 1971 to 1973 as assistant rabbi of Temple Israel in Memphis, Tennessee. While serving as rabbi, he was also a visiting professor in Millsaps College's religion department. In 1977, he won the Samuel Kaminker Memorial Award for his informal education curriculum, and in 1983 he was alumni-in-residence at Hebrew Union College in New York. He served Beth Israel until 1986, then moved to Congregation Schaarai Zedek in Tampa, Florida.

Birnholz was followed by Eric Gurvis, Steven Engel, and Jim Egolf, all of whom, like Nussbaum before them, also served as the rabbis of Temple Beth El in Lexington, Mississippi, leading services there once a month on Sunday. At the end of the 20th century, Beth Israel was the largest of the fourteen synagogues in Mississippi, with 213 member families.

In 2003, Beth Israel hired Valerie Cohen, Beth Israel's first female rabbi. Cohen had originally earned a B.A. in public relations, then studied at Hebrew Union College's Israel, Cincinnati, and New York City campuses. She graduated in 1999, and was ordained at Manhattan's Temple Emanuel. After serving for three years as assistant rabbi at Temple Israel in Memphis, Tennessee, Cohen joined Beth Israel. She continued the tradition of her predecessors of also serving as the rabbi of Lexington's Temple Beth El.

In 2005, Cohen started classes for adults who wished to celebrate their Bar and Bat Mitzvah, but had not had the opportunity when 12 or 13. That same year, in the aftermath of Hurricane Katrina, Beth Israel welcomed between 75 and 100 evacuees from New Orleans. In 2006, Beth Israel had a membership of approximately 200 families which, in contrast with Mississippi's other Jewish congregations, was slowly growing. Beth Israel's services were attended by about 50 people in 2008. In 2013, the synagogue's windows were broken and the word "Jew" scratched into the paint of a door.

Cohen accepted an offer to become rabbi of Temple Emanuel Sinai in Worcester, Massachusetts, in 2014. She was followed at Beth Israel by interim rabbis Ted Riter and Stephen Wylen.

Jeffrey Kurtz-Lendner joined as rabbi in 2016. A graduate of Brandeis University and the Jewish Theological Seminary, he had served as rabbi of the Northshore Jewish Congregation of Mandeville, Louisiana, from 2002 to 2007, and Temple Solel in Hollywood, Florida, from 2007 to 2015. By 2017, membership had reached 214 families; that year, the congregation held its fiftieth annual charity food bazaar, and celebrated its fiftieth year in the Old Canton Road building.

In recognition of its contributions to the civil rights movement, the synagogue was added as a stop on the Mississippi Freedom Trail in April 2018.

== Arson ==
On January 10, 2026, a pre-dawn fire severely damaged the synagogue. The cause of the fire was determined to be arson, and a suspect was arrested later that day. No congregants were injured, but the fire destroyed parts of the administrative offices, library, and several Torah scrolls. The suspect accidentally caused severe burns to his face, hands, and ankles during the attack, and was hospitalized afterwards. Fire officials said the building narrowly avoided total structural collapse due to the rapid response of emergency crews.

The United States Department of Justice announced that the defendant and suspect in the arson case is 19-year-old Peter Spencer Pittman. The suspect in the arson case admitted to targeting the synagogue due to its "Jewish ties," referring to the building as the "synagogue of Satan." Federal authorities stated that the language used by the suspect reflected antisemitic ideology and that the attack was being investigated as a hate crime targeting a religious institution. Prosecutors charged the suspect with arson of a religious building and indicated that additional federal hate crime charges were under consideration.
