= Valerie Cohen =

American Reform rabbi

Rabbi Valerie Cohen

Personal life
- Born: Cleveland, United States

Religious life
- Religion: Judaism
- Denomination: Reform Judaism

Jewish leader
- Position: Rabbi
- Synagogue: Temple Emanuel Sinai
- Residence: Holden, Massachusetts
- Semikhah: 1999

Valerie Cohen is an American Reform rabbi.

== Biography ==
Born in Cleveland, Ohio, Cohen was raised in Florida, where she earned a B.A. in public relations at University of Florida, graduating in 1993. She then studied at Hebrew Union College's Israel, Cincinnati and New York City campuses, where she graduated in 1999 and was ordained at Manhattan's Temple Emanuel. That year she joined Temple Israel in Memphis, Tennessee, as assistant rabbi.

In 2003, Beth Israel Congregation of Jackson, Mississippi, hired Cohen as its sole rabbi, the "only pulpit rabbi in Jackson". She simultaneously served as the rabbi of Lexington, Mississippi's Temple Beth El.

In 2013, The Forward named Cohen one of its 36 inspiring rabbis.

Cohen became rabbi of Temple Emanuel Sinai in Worcester, Massachusetts in 2014.
