= Laurence B. Packard =

American historian

- Born: Laurence Bradford Packard; January 20, 1887; Brockton, Massachusetts, United States
- Died: January 14, 1955 (aged 67); Amherst, Massachusetts
- Education: Harvard University
- Occupation: Historian

Laurence Bradford Packard (January 20, 1887 – January 14, 1955) was an American historian. He was a professor at Amherst College for 6 years.

== Early life ==
He was born in Brockton, Massachusetts in 1887. He studied at Brockton High School. In 1909, he completed his A.B. degree from Harvard University.

== Education ==
He completed his PhD in 1921. His PhD dealt with the age of Louis XIV.

== Career ==
He was a professor at the University of Rochester in 1913-1925.

He was a professor at Amherst College in 1925-1931.

== Books ==
His books include:

- Packard, Laurence Bradford (1929). The Age of Louis XIV. New York: H. Holt and Co. OCLC 585901.
- Packard, Laurence Bradford (1927). The Commercial Revolution, 1440-1776; mercantilism - Colbert - Adam Smith. New York: H. Holt and Co. OCLC 517786.
