= Temple Emanuel Sinai (Worcester, Massachusetts) =

Reform synagogue in Worcester, Massachusetts, US

- Hebrew: עִמָנוּאֵל סִינַי
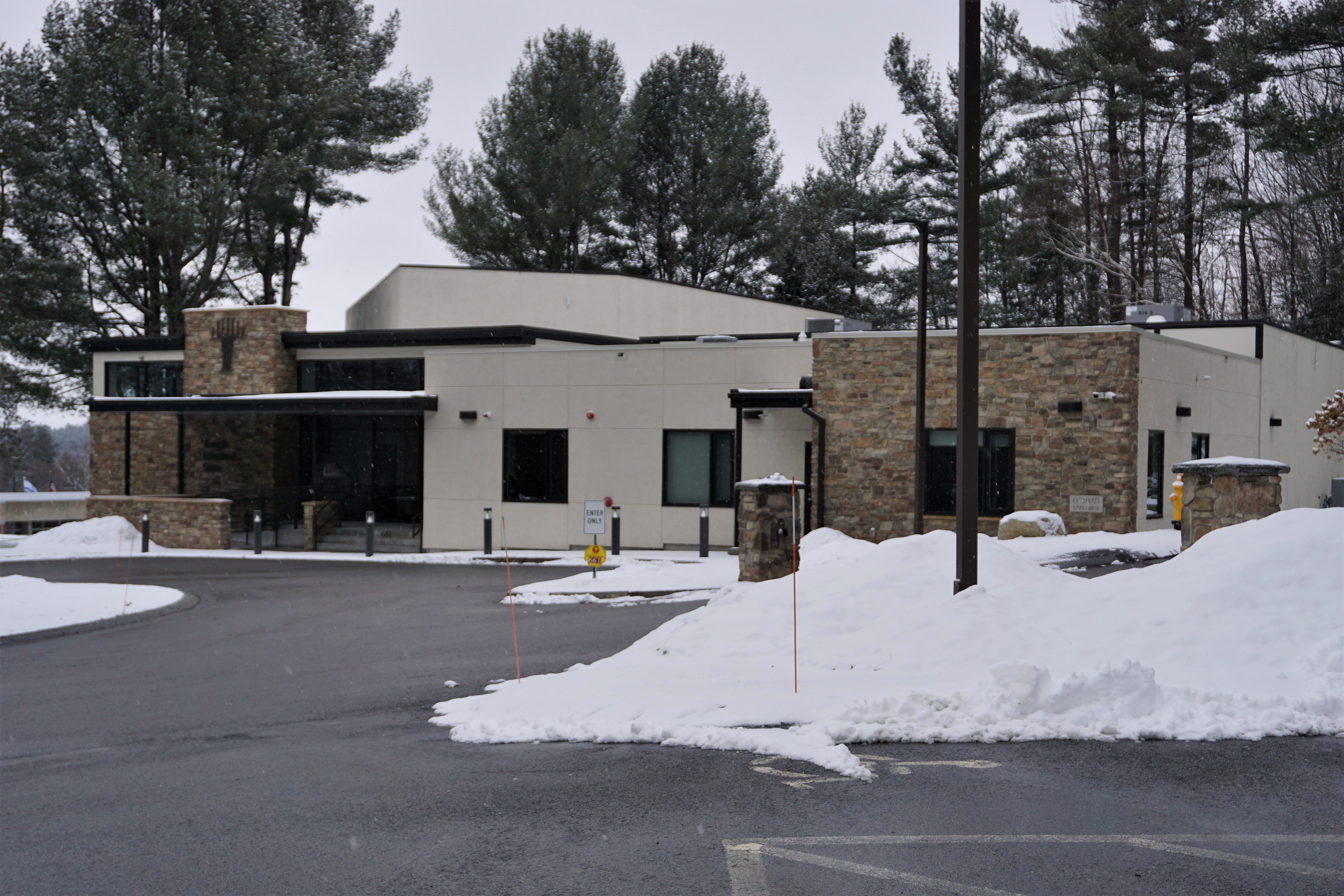
- Temple Emanuel Sinai, in 2022

- Location in Massachusetts

Religion
- Affiliation: Reform Judaism
- Ecclesiastical or organizational status: Synagogue
- Leadership: Rabbi Valerie Cohen
- Status: Active

Location
- Location: 661 Salisbury Street, Worcester, Massachusetts
- Country: United States
- Interactive map of Temple Emanuel Sinai
- Coordinates: 42°17′44″N 71°50′25″W

Architecture
- Architect: Charles R. Greco (1949)
- Type: Synagogue
- Style: Colonial Revival (1949)
- Established: 2013 (merged Temple Emanuel Sinai): 1921 (Temple Emanuel); 1957 (Temple Sinai)
- Completed: Temple Emanuel: 1921 (Suburban Road); 1923 (Elm Street^{[note a]}); 1949 (May Street); Temple Sinai: 1951 (Elm Street^{[note a]}); 1962 (Salisbury Street^{[note b]}); Temple Emanuel Sinai: 2013 (Salisbury Street^{[note b]})
- Site area: 42 acres (17 ha)

Website
- emanuelsinai.org

Temple Emanuel Sinai (Hebrew: עִמָנוּאֵל סִינַי, lit. 'God is with us Sinai') is a Reform Jewish synagogue located at 661 Salisbury Street in Worcester, Massachusetts in the United States of America. The congregation was formed in 2013 through the merger of Worcester's two Reform congregations, Temple Emanuel and Temple Sinai, and traces its origins to 1921. It is affiliated with the Union for Reform Judaism.

The synagogue is adjacent to the Worcester Jewish Community Center, on property acquired by Temple Sinai in 1962 for its permanent home. Temple Emanuel's former building at 280 May Street was sold in 2013 to the Worcester State University Foundation, with the sale allowing continued use of the building until 2015. Planning for the congregation's final location concluded in 2014, resulting in a decision to expand and renovate the Temple Sinai facility at 661 Salisbury Street, rather than relocate to the campus of Congregation Beth Israel, also in Worcester.

Rabbi Matthew Berger, who became Temple Emanuel's rabbi in 2009, served as the first rabbi of Temple Emanuel Sinai following the merger. In 2014, Rabbi Valerie Cohen succeeded Berger.

== Brief overview of history ==
=== Temple Emanuel congregation ===
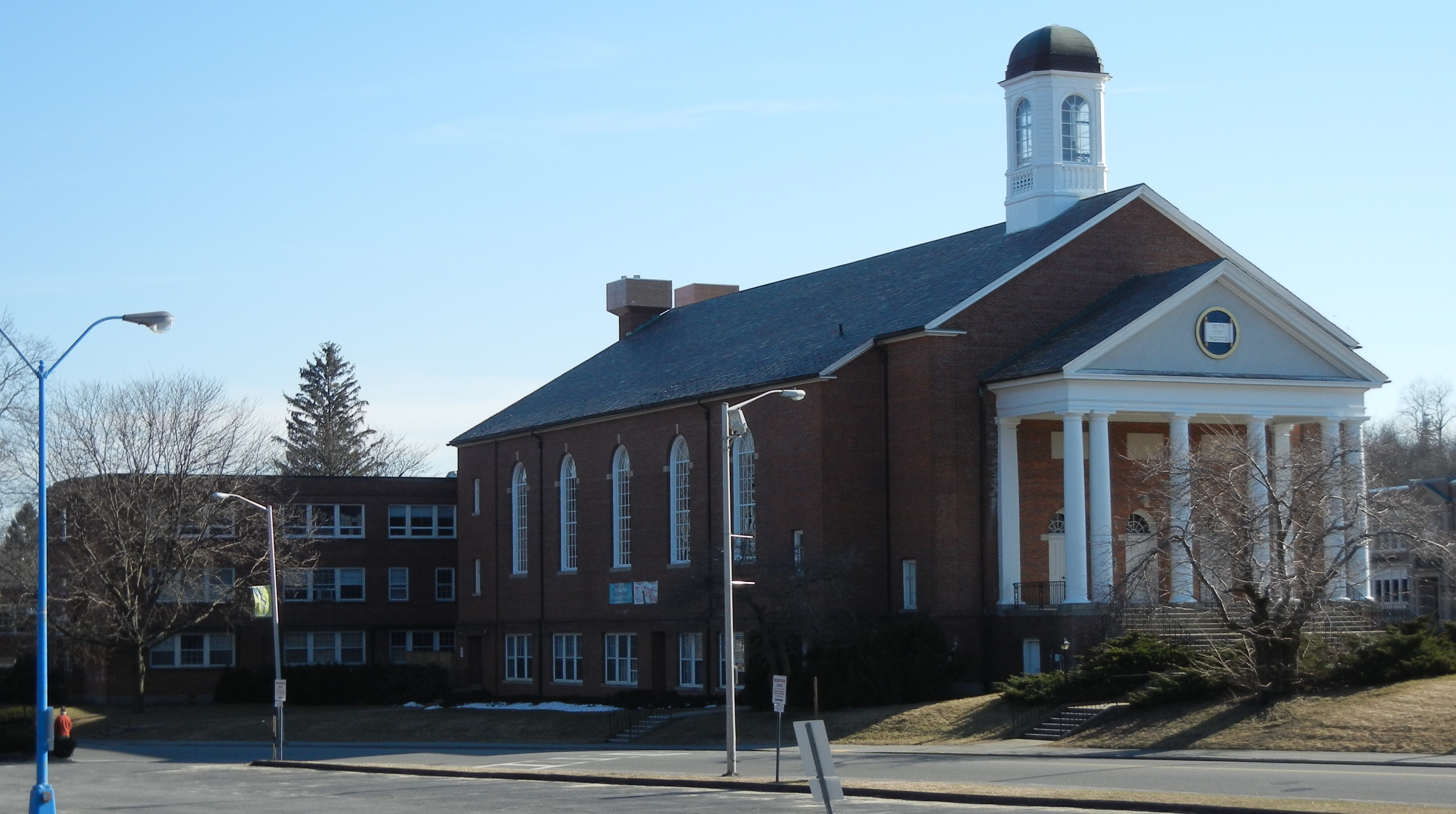
280 May Street

Founded in 1921, Temple Emanuel was the first Reform Jewish congregation established in Worcester, Massachusetts, and remained the city's largest synagogue from the 1940s until its 2013 integration with its offshoot, Temple Sinai. The congregation's third and largest building, located at 280 May Street, was completed and consecrated in 1949 and expanded in 1961 to accommodate a religious school enrollment of nearly 1,000 students. Membership reached its peak in 1957 with 1,340 families, making it one of the largest Reform congregations in the United States at the time. As of 1982, it was the second-largest Reform congregation in New England. By 2009, membership had declined to 425 families.

Temple Emanuel was led by two long-serving rabbis who played significant roles in both the local community and the Reform movement. Rabbi Levi Olan (1929–1948) became the first Jewish president of the Worcester Ministerial Union and oversaw membership growth from fewer than 200 to 610 families. Rabbi Joseph Klein (1949–1996) continued Olan's emphasis on interfaith engagement, serving as president of the Worcester Ministers’ Association and the Greater Worcester Clergy Association. During his tenure, membership increased from 610 families to 1,340 families in 1957 before gradually declining in subsequent decades.

=== Temple Sinai congregation ===
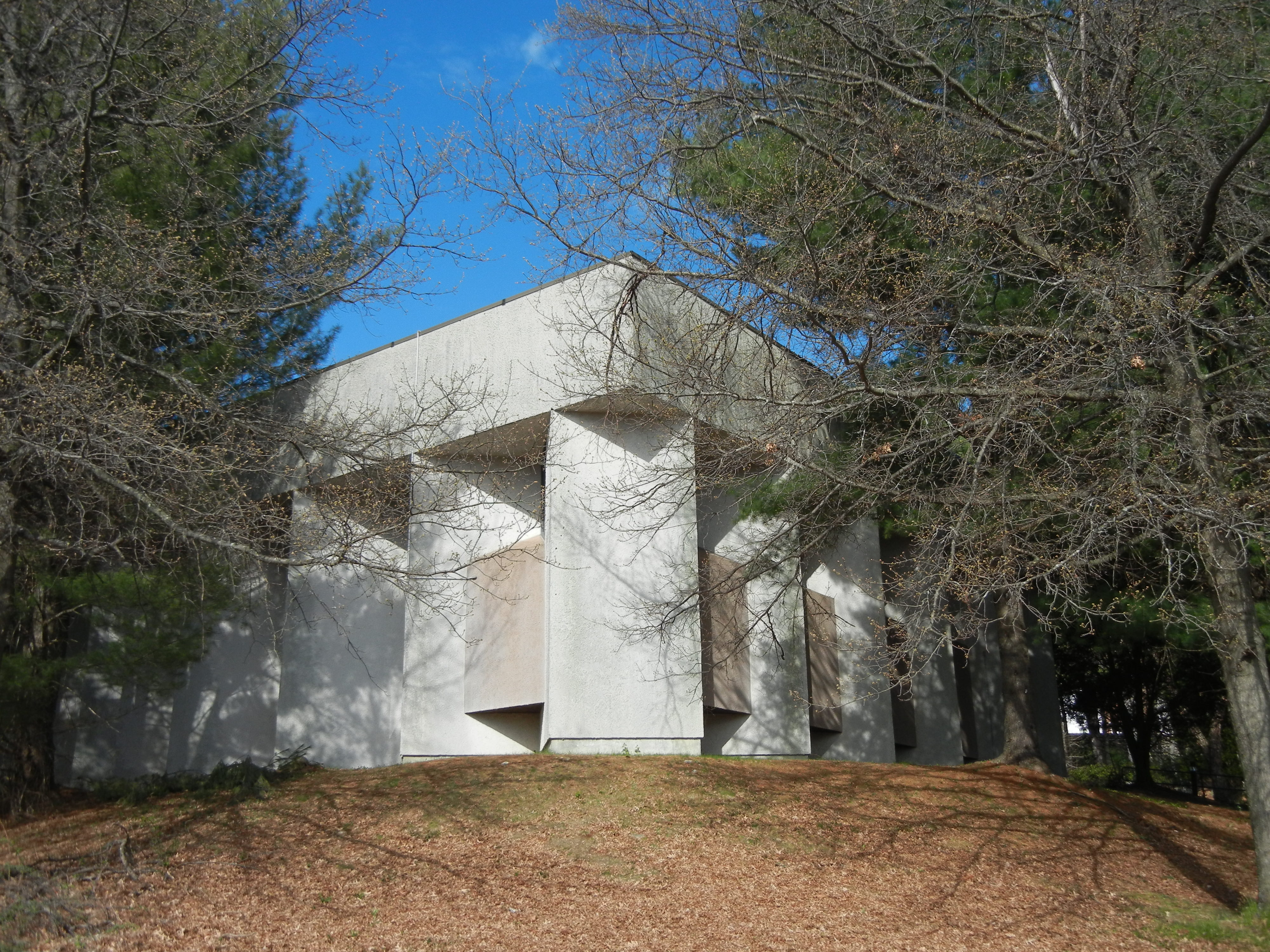
661 Salisbury Street

In a letter dated December 16, 1957, the Steering Committee of Temple Sinai—a group of Temple Emanuel members who believed that the congregation's close-knit character had diminished and that its religious practices had become more conservative—formally notified the secretary of Temple Emanuel's board of their intent to establish a second Reform congregation in Worcester. Temple Sinai's founding Statement of Principles included a provision limiting membership to 500 families.

=== Merger of congregations ===
Facing declining membership and increasing financial challenges associated with demographic changes in Worcester's Jewish community, members of Temple Emanuel and Temple Sinai began discussions on re-integration in 2011. After 54 years as separate congregations—and following encouragement from the Union for Reform Judaism over a period of at least two decades—Temple Sinai leadership formally reached out to Temple Emanuel to pursue unification.

In 2012, Temple Emanuel listed its May Street campus for sale after both congregations determined that Temple Sinai's property at 661 Salisbury Street would serve as the site for the combined congregation. In May 2013, Temple Emanuel members voted to approve the sale of the 280 May Street building to the Worcester State University Foundation. The following month, members of both congregations voted in favor of re-integration and the establishment of a unified Reform congregation under the name Temple Emanuel Sinai.

== Rabbinical leaders ==
The following individuals served as rabbi of the merged Temple Emanuel Sinai:

Ordinal	Name	Years	Notes
1	Matthew Berger	2013–2014	Served as rabbi of Temple Emanuel from 2009 to the 2013 merger
2	Valerie Cohen	2014–present	

== Temple Emanuel history ==
=== Early history (1920–1948) ===
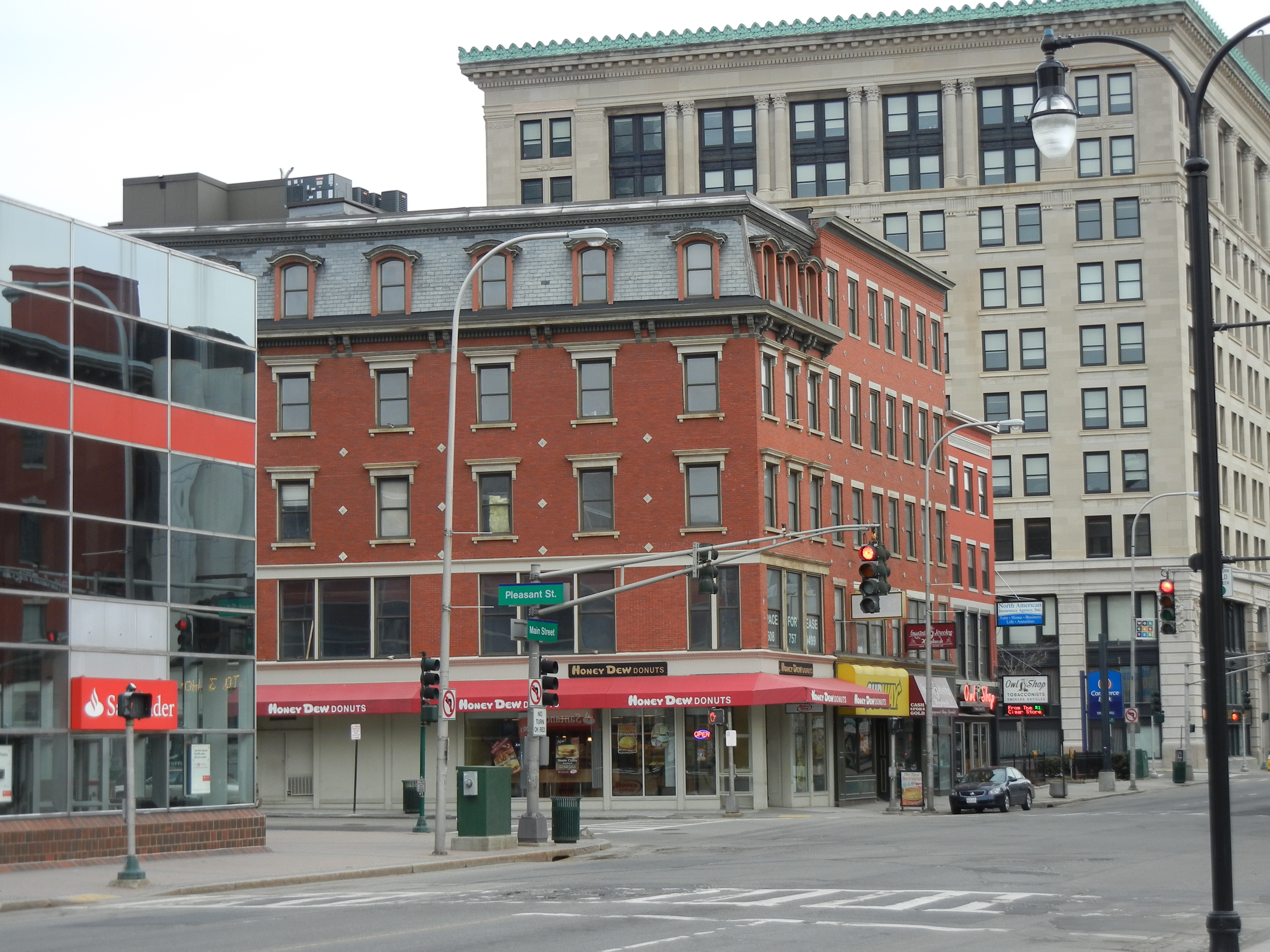
Harrington Corner (1921–1922)

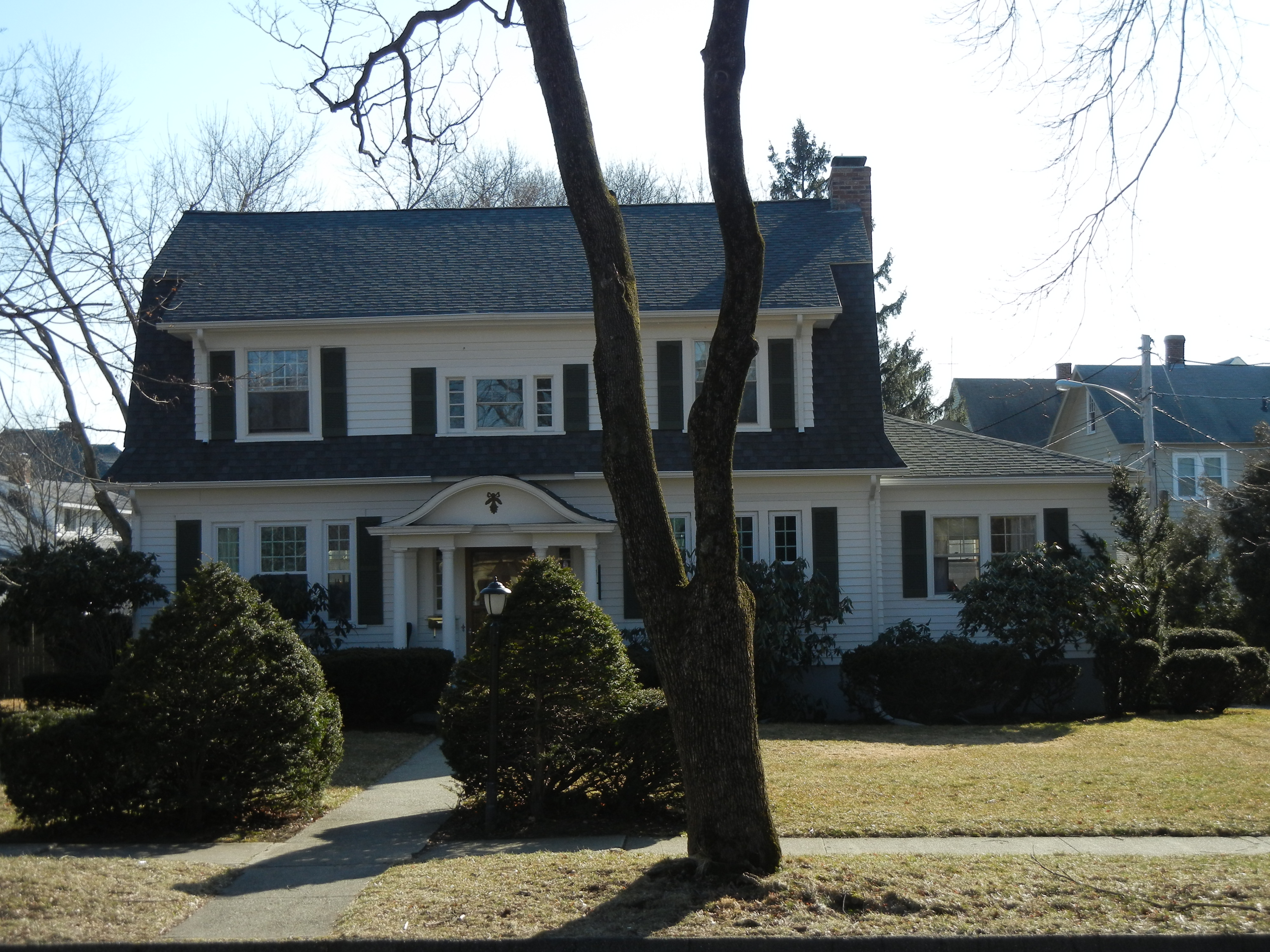
22 Suburban Road (1922–1923)

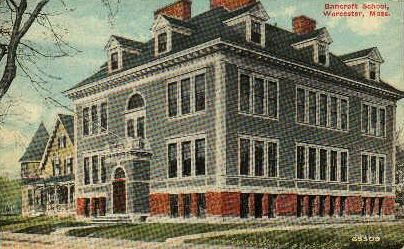
111 Elm Street (1923–1949)

In 1920, sixty men whose families had relocated from Worcester's Union Hill neighborhood on the East Side to the wealthier West Side met at the Bancroft Hotel to plan the establishment of a synagogue in their new community. In 1921, the group began holding services in a Modern Orthodox style above Easton's Tea Room at Harrington Corner in downtown Worcester. The same year, it incorporated as the Worcester Modern Congregation and in 1922 opened its first synagogue, known as the West Side Community House, in a converted residence at 22 Suburban Road. By 1923, the congregation had outgrown that facility and moved to the former Bancroft School building at 111 Elm Street, adopting the name Temple Emanuel. Under the leadership of Rabbi Levi Olan, the congregation gradually adopted Reform practices and officially affiliated with the Reform movement in 1937.

The congregation played an active role in civic and social affairs, including the Civil Rights Movement. In 1931, its Brotherhood hosted a symposium titled "Foundations of the Race Problem" featuring lectures by several speakers, including W. E. B. Du Bois.

=== Joseph Klein era ===
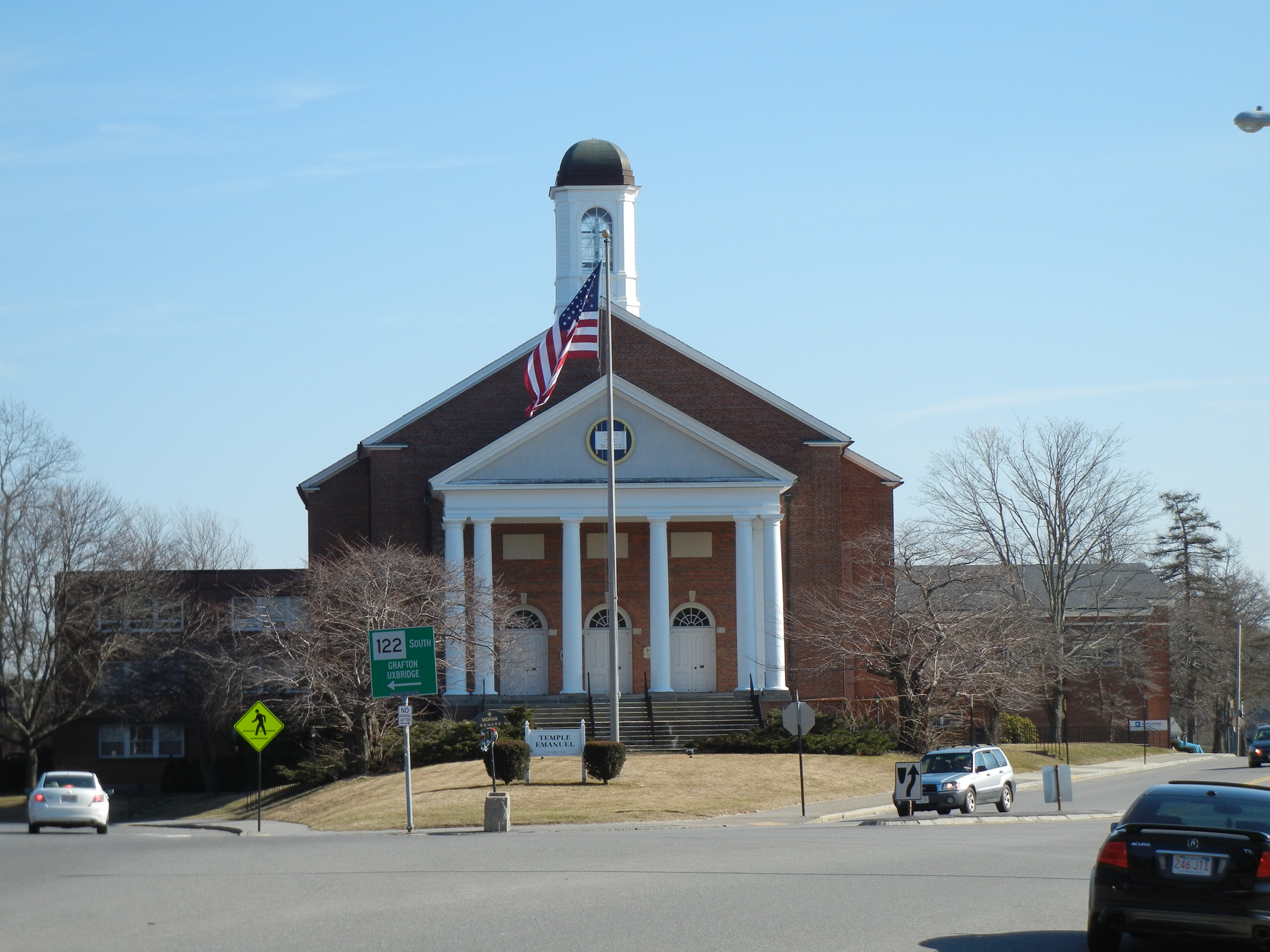
280 May Street (1949–2013)

In 1949, Temple Emanuel moved to a new building at the intersection of May and Chandler Streets.

Rabbi Joseph Klein, who began his tenure in 1949, served until his retirement in 1977 and continued as Rabbi Emeritus until his death in 1996. Klein mentored several future Reform leaders, including Rabbi Alexander M. Schindler, who served as Temple Emanuel's assistant and associate rabbi from 1953 to 1959, and Rabbi Eric Yoffie.

Rabbi Klein later served part-time as the first rabbi of Temple Beth-El in Las Cruces, New Mexico, before returning to Worcester in 1984. He was the great-grandfather of Alisan Porter.

By 1957, Temple Emanuel had reached a peak membership of 1,340 families, including 42 who also belonged to Congregation Beth Israel in Worcester. At that time, Worcester's ten other Jewish congregations had a combined membership of 1,410 families.

From 1959 to 1962, Temple Emanuel hosted the "Temple Forum" lecture series, featuring speakers such as Hubert Humphrey, Martin Luther King Jr., Theodore Bikel, and Eleanor Roosevelt. In 1965, the synagogue hosted the recording of Hear O Israel: A Prayer Ceremony in Jazz, conducted by congregant Jonathan Klein with performances by Herbie Hancock and other musicians. The synagogue was the site of the funerals for Gregory G. Pincus in 1967 and Abbie Hoffman in 1989.

=== Post-Klein era ===
Rabbi Stanley Davids served as Temple Emanuel's fifth rabbi from 1977 to 1986.

Temple Emanuel celebrated its 70th anniversary on October 25, 1991. In 2003, the congregation installed Carlton Watson as president.

Rabbi Matthew L. Berger served as the congregation's ninth and final rabbi from 2009 until the 2013 merger with Temple Sinai, and continued as the first rabbi of the combined Temple Emanuel Sinai until 2014, when he was succeeded by Rabbi Valerie Cohen.

=== Education ===
In 2012, Temple Emanuel's religious school joined with Congregation Beth Israel and Temple Sinai to create PaRDeS, the Worcester Jewish Community Religious School, which operated until 2016.

=== Facilities ===
The synagogue building at 280 May Street, designed by architect Charles R. Greco and completed in 1949 in the Colonial Revival style, included a sanctuary, a 1,000-seat auditorium, and educational spaces. It was expanded in 1961 with a classroom wing and clergy offices. As enrollment declined, the classroom wing was leased to various educational institutions, including Worcester State University, the Abby Kelley Foster Charter Public School, and Quinsigamond Community College's Training and Education center.

==== Dedicated spaces ====
Dedicated spaces within the building included the Abraham & Mae Persky Sanctuary, the Philip & Mary Rose Chapel, the Stacy A. Cohan Youth Center, and the Joseph and Sophie Cohan Nursery School Playground. A renovation of the Persky Sanctuary in 2011 lowered and extended the bimah, reducing seating capacity from 918 to 626.

=== Worship ===
==== Daily Minyan ====
Temple Emanuel maintained a daily lay-led minyan from 1954 until 2011 and continued to offer regular Shabbat and weekday services throughout its history. Temple Emanuel Sinai later maintained the tradition with Monday evening services at its Salisbury Street location.

=== Rabbinical leaders ===
The following individuals served as rabbi of Temple Emanuel:

Ordinal	Name	Years	Notes
1	Maurice Mazure	1923–1926	
2	Julius Gordon	1926–1929	
3	Levi Olan	1929–1948	
4	Joseph Klein	1949–1977	Emeritus: 1977–1996
5	Stanley Davids	1977–1986	
6	Norman Mendel	1986–1991	
−	Stuart W. Gershon	1991–1992	interim
7	James L. Simon	1992–1998	
−	Sigma F. Coran	1998–1999	interim
8	Jordan Millstein	1999–2008	
−	Ilene Bogosian	2008–2009	interim
9	Matthew Berger	2009–2013	Continued to serve as rabbi of merged congregation

== Temple Sinai history ==
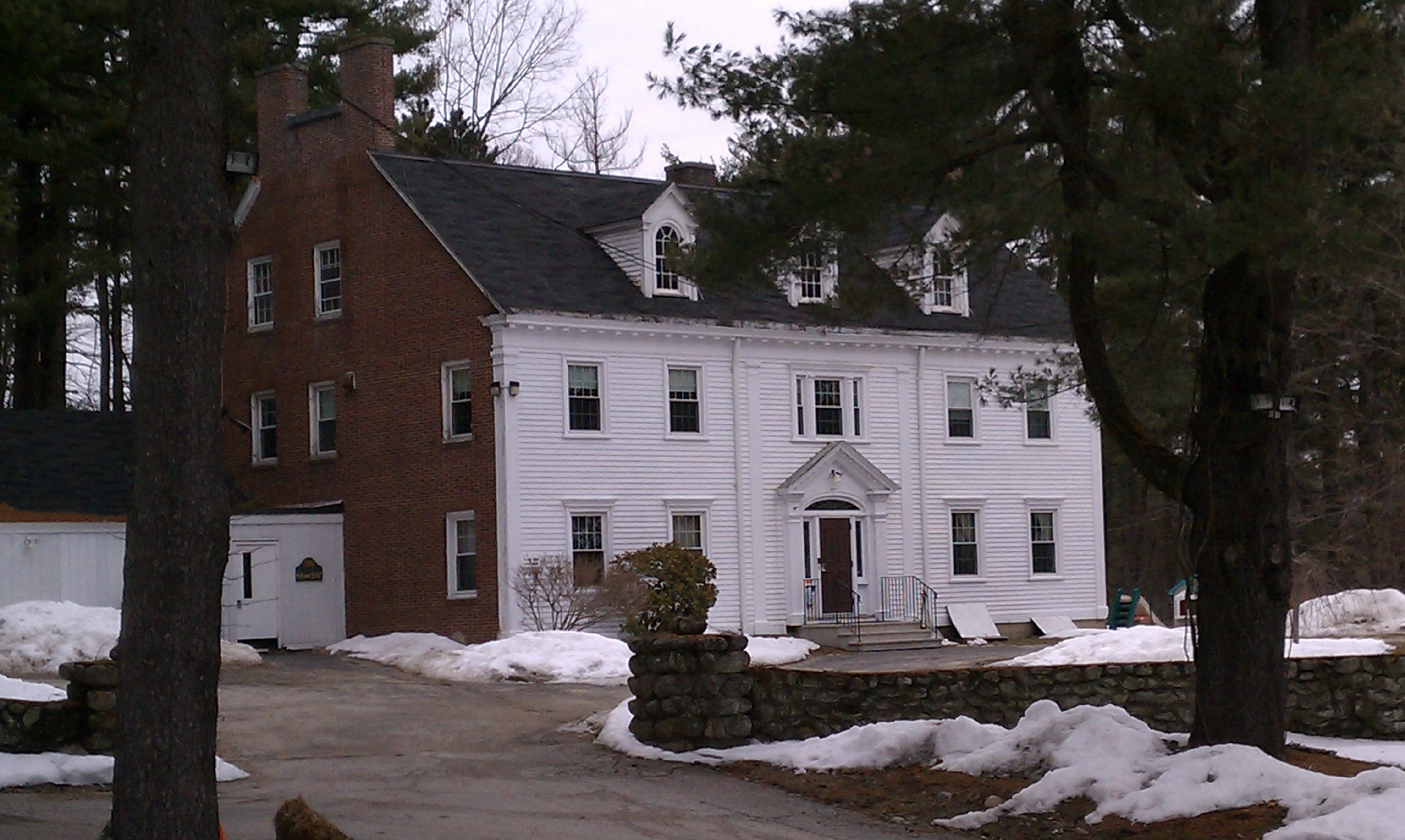
661 Salisbury Street (1962–2013)

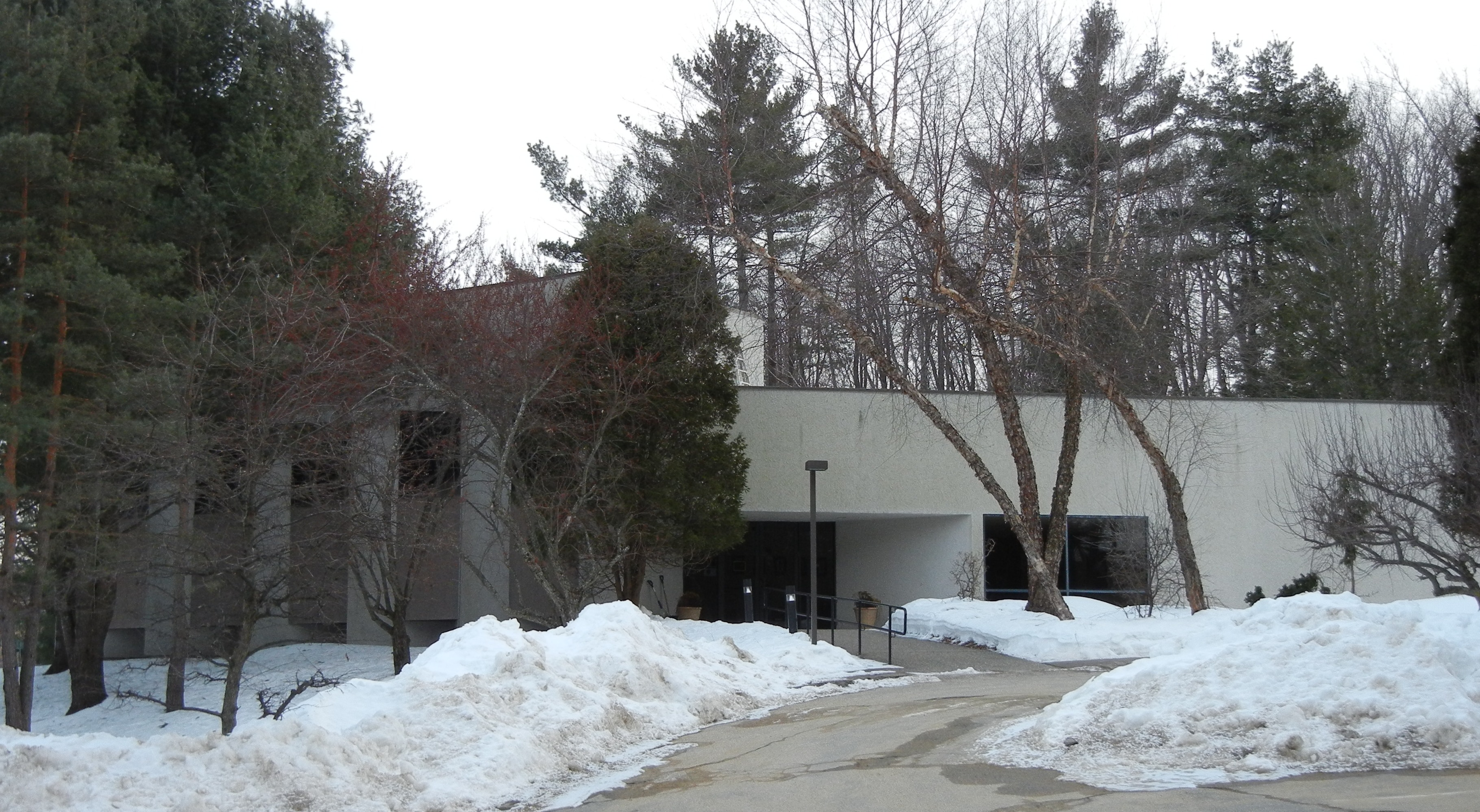
661 Salisbury Street (1980–2013)

Temple Sinai held its first services from 1957 to 1962 at the Worcester Jewish Community Center, which had relocated in 1951 to Temple Emanuel's former building at 111 Elm Street. In 1962, the congregation moved to a 42-acre estate it had purchased at 661 Salisbury Street, where services and religious school classes were conducted in a large mansion on the property. In 1980, Temple Sinai completed its first purpose-built synagogue on the same site, retaining the mansion for use as offices and classrooms.

The Worcester Jewish Community Center, also expanding beyond its Elm Street facility, built a new building adjacent to Temple Sinai at 633 Salisbury Street and moved there in 1967.

During its early years, Temple Sinai adopted many practices associated with Classical Reform Judaism, distinguishing itself from Temple Emanuel. These included discontinuing the use of traditional religious garments such as kippot and tallitot, though these practices were gradually reintroduced over time.

The congregation's first rabbi, Leonard Helman, joined Temple Sinai in 1958. He was succeeded by Rabbis John Rosenblatt and Michael Barenbaum. David Kaplan served as the congregation's early cantorial soloist. Rabbi Gary Glickstein led the congregation from 1977 to 1985, followed by Rabbi Seth Bernstein, who served as Temple Sinai’srabbi from 1986 to 2011. Cantor Wendy Autenrieth served as Cantor/Educator from 1987 to 1999.

=== Rabbinical leaders ===
The following individuals served as rabbi of Temple Sinai:

Ordinal	Name	Years	Notes
1	Leonard Helman	1958–1959	
2	Kenneth E. Stein	1959–1967	
3	Joseph Kurasick	1967–1970	
4	John Rosenblatt	1970–1971	
−	Sanford Seltzer	1971–1973	interim
−	Harold Jaye	1971–1973	interim
5	Michael Barenbaum	1973–1976	
−	Sanford Seltzer	1977	interim
6	Gary Glickstein	1977–1985	
7	Seth Bernstein	1986–2011	Emeritus: 2011–2013
−	Scott Saulson	2011–2012	interim
−	Michael Swartz	2012–2013	interim
−	Carol Glass	2012–2013	interim

== Notable members ==
- Samuel Adler
- Harriette L. Chandler
- Arthur E. Chase
- Joseph C. Casdin
- Harold Devine
- Joanne Goldstein
- Jacob Hiatt
- Abbie Hoffman
- Myra Kraft
- Harry C. Payne
- Denise Eisenberg Rich
- Warren M. Robbins
- Alan F. Segal
- David B. Yoffie

== Gallery ==
=== Salisbury Street ===
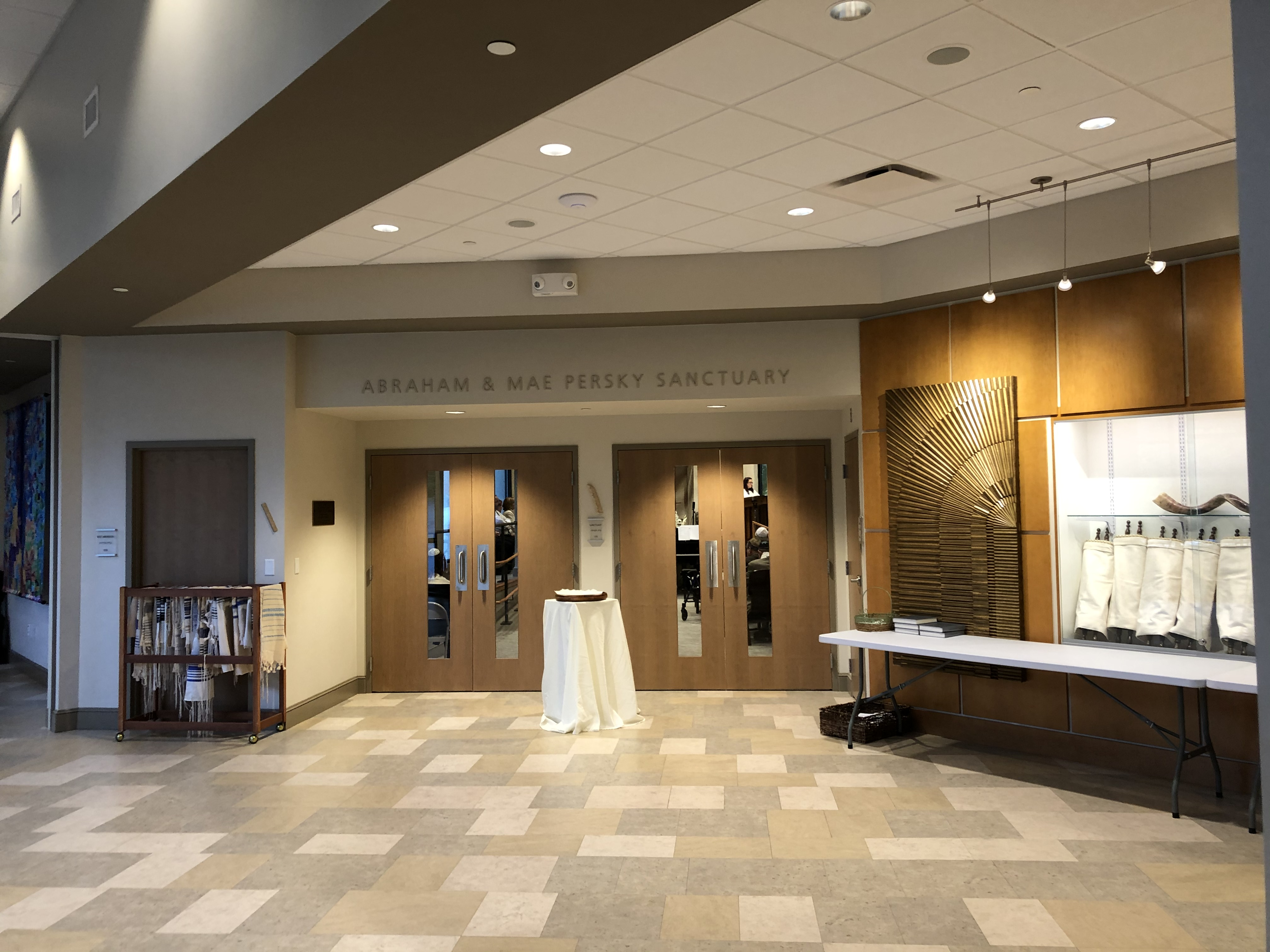
Lobby

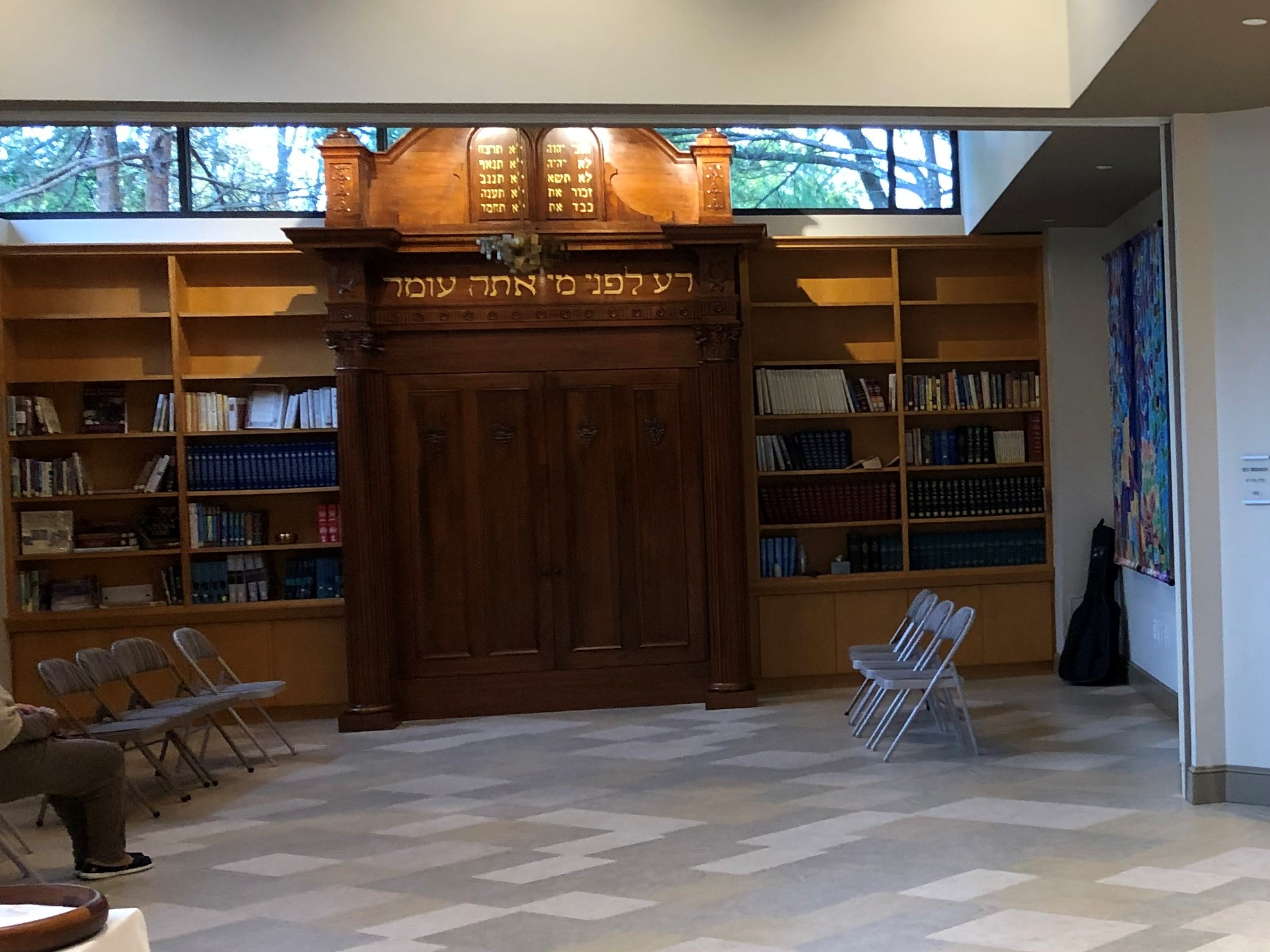
Beit Midrash (Chapel/Library)

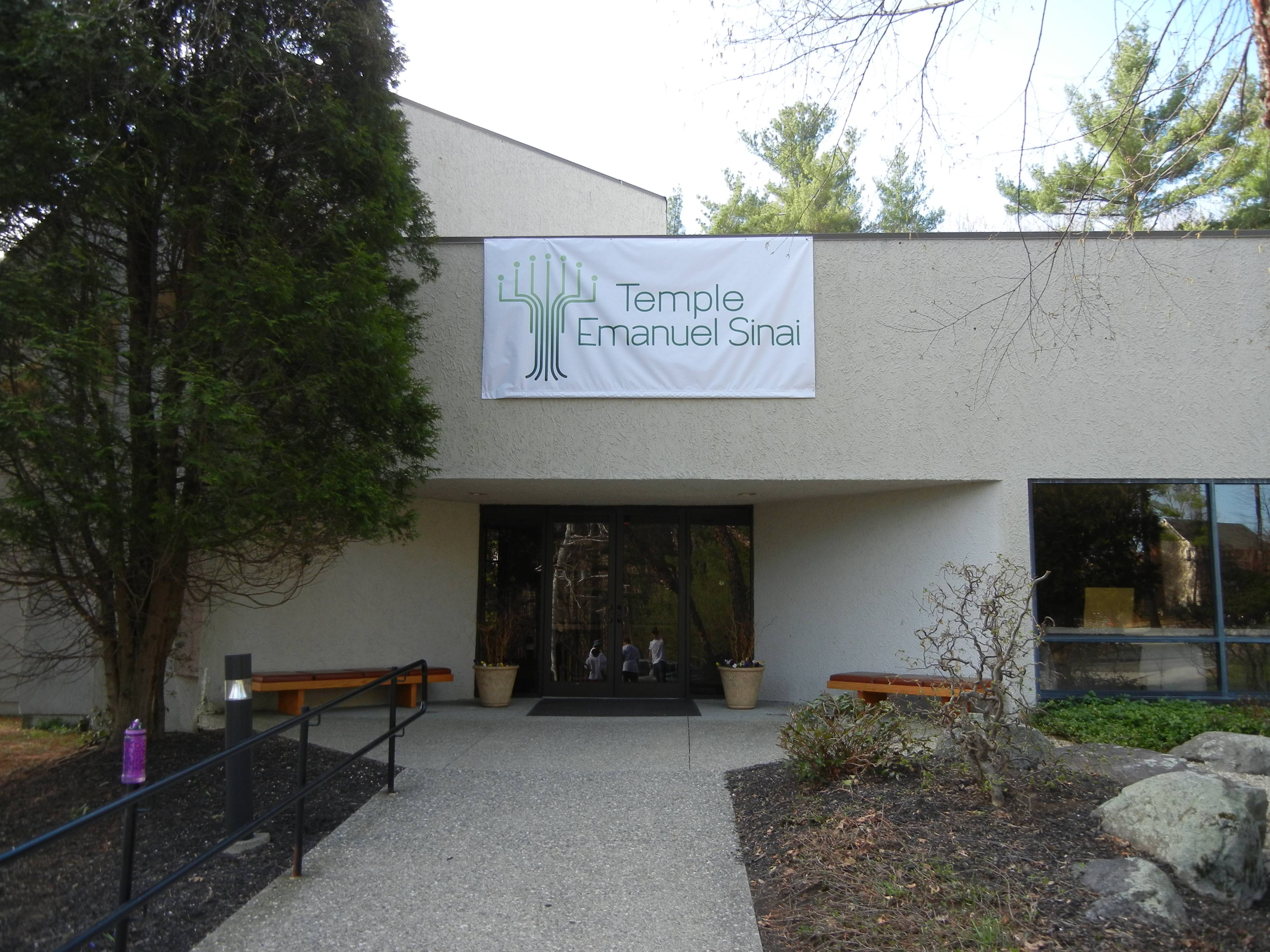
Front entrance to Temple Sinai, in 2015

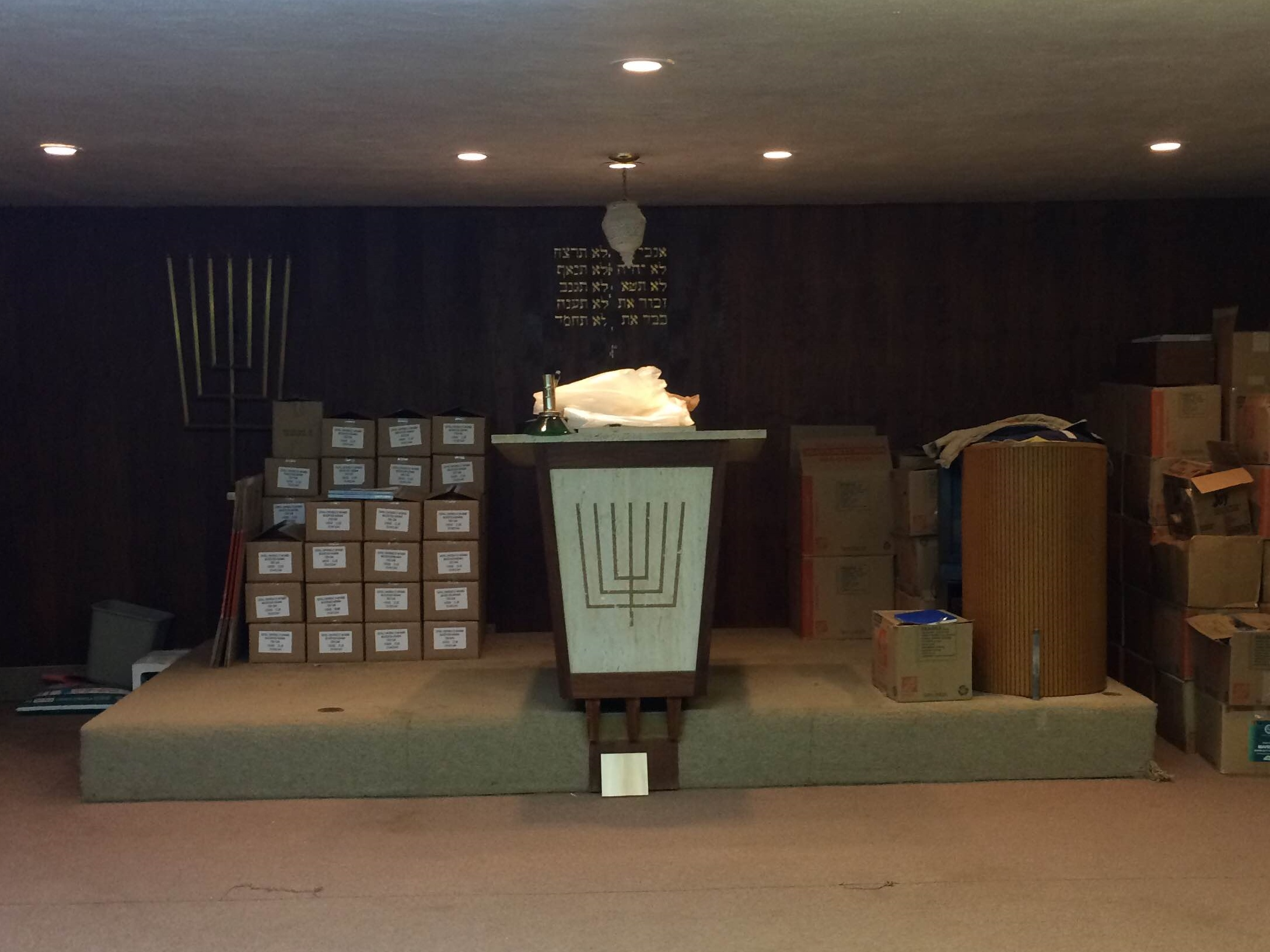
Chapel of Temple Sinai

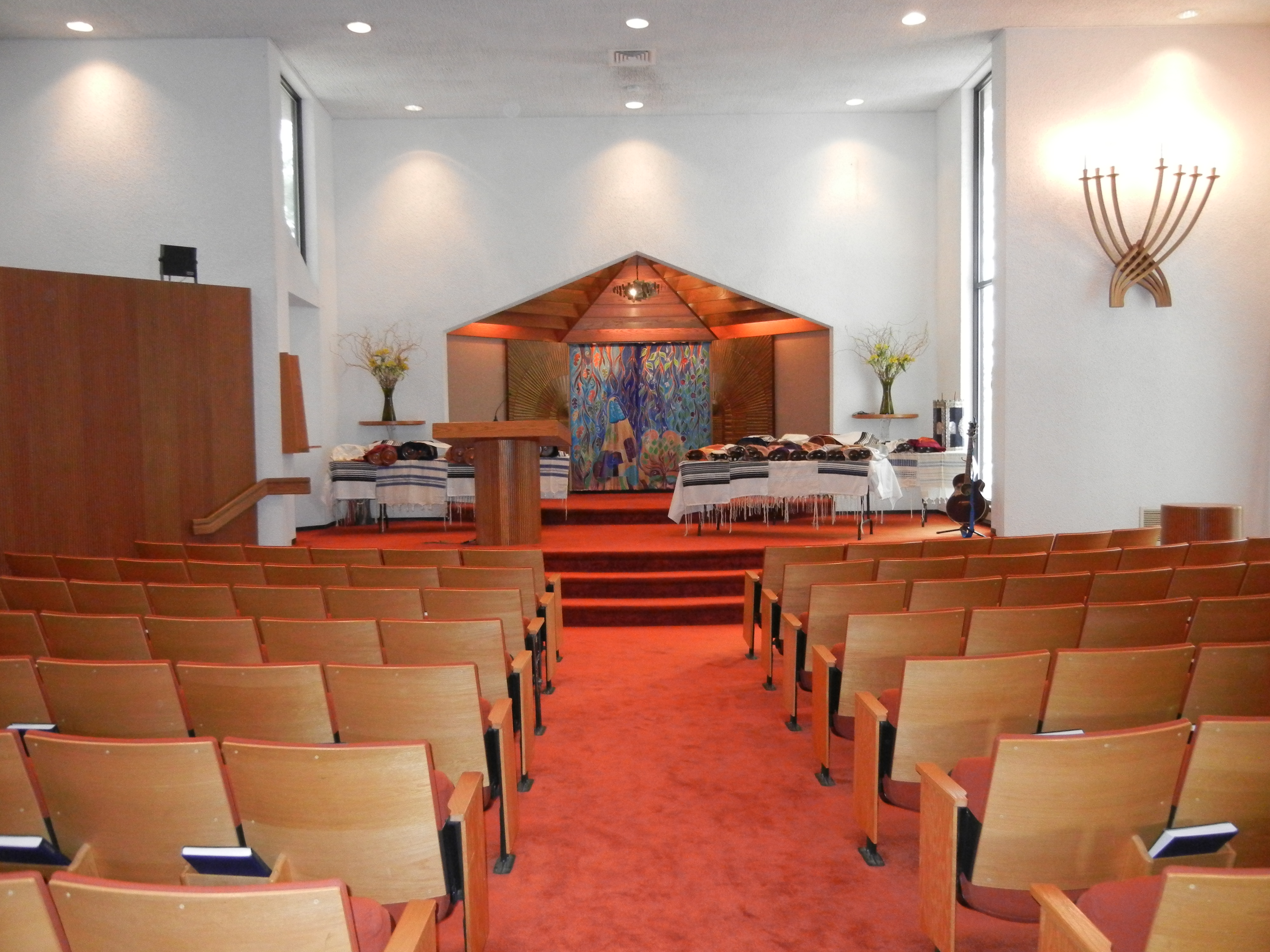
Sanctuary of Temple Sinai

=== May Street ===
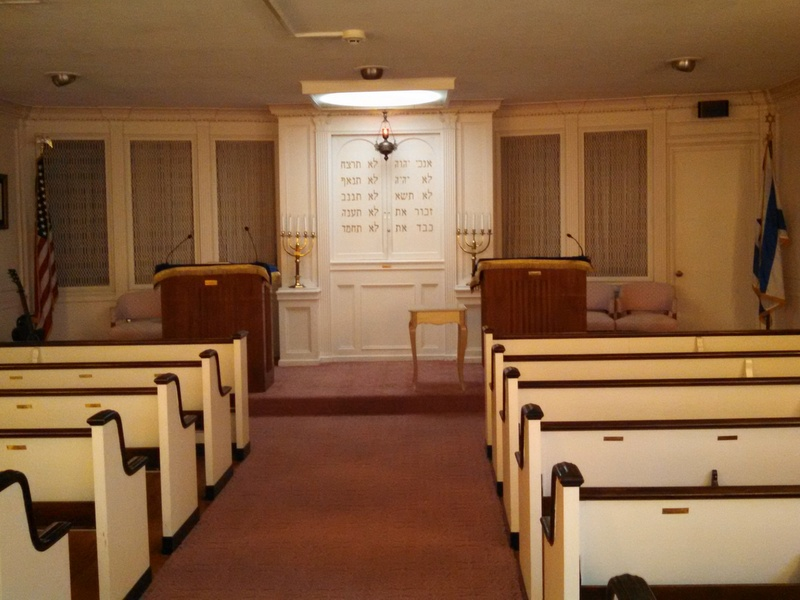
Philip & Mary Rose Chapel

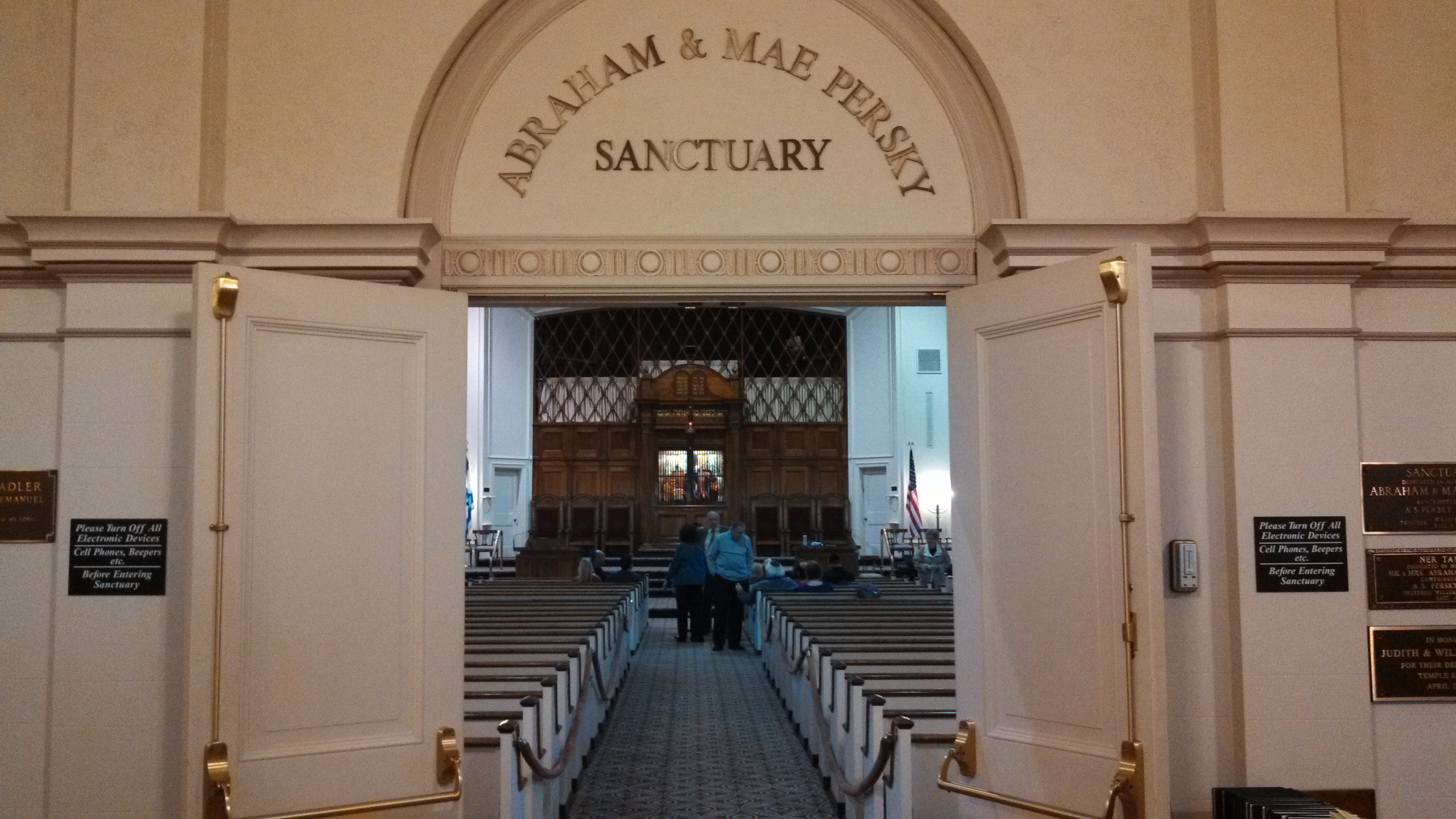
Abraham & Mae Persky Sanctuary through lobby doors

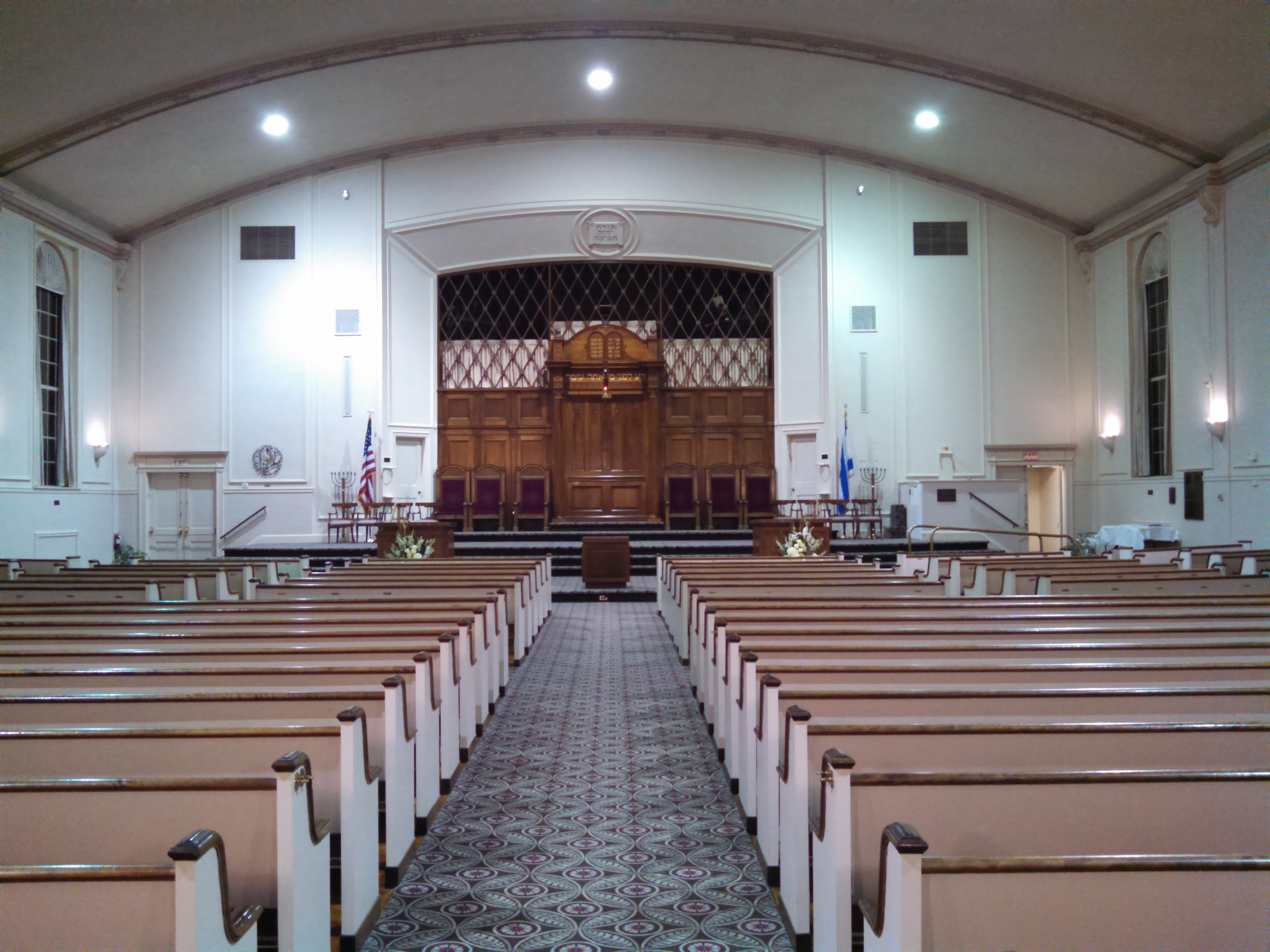
Abraham & Mae Persky Sanctuary

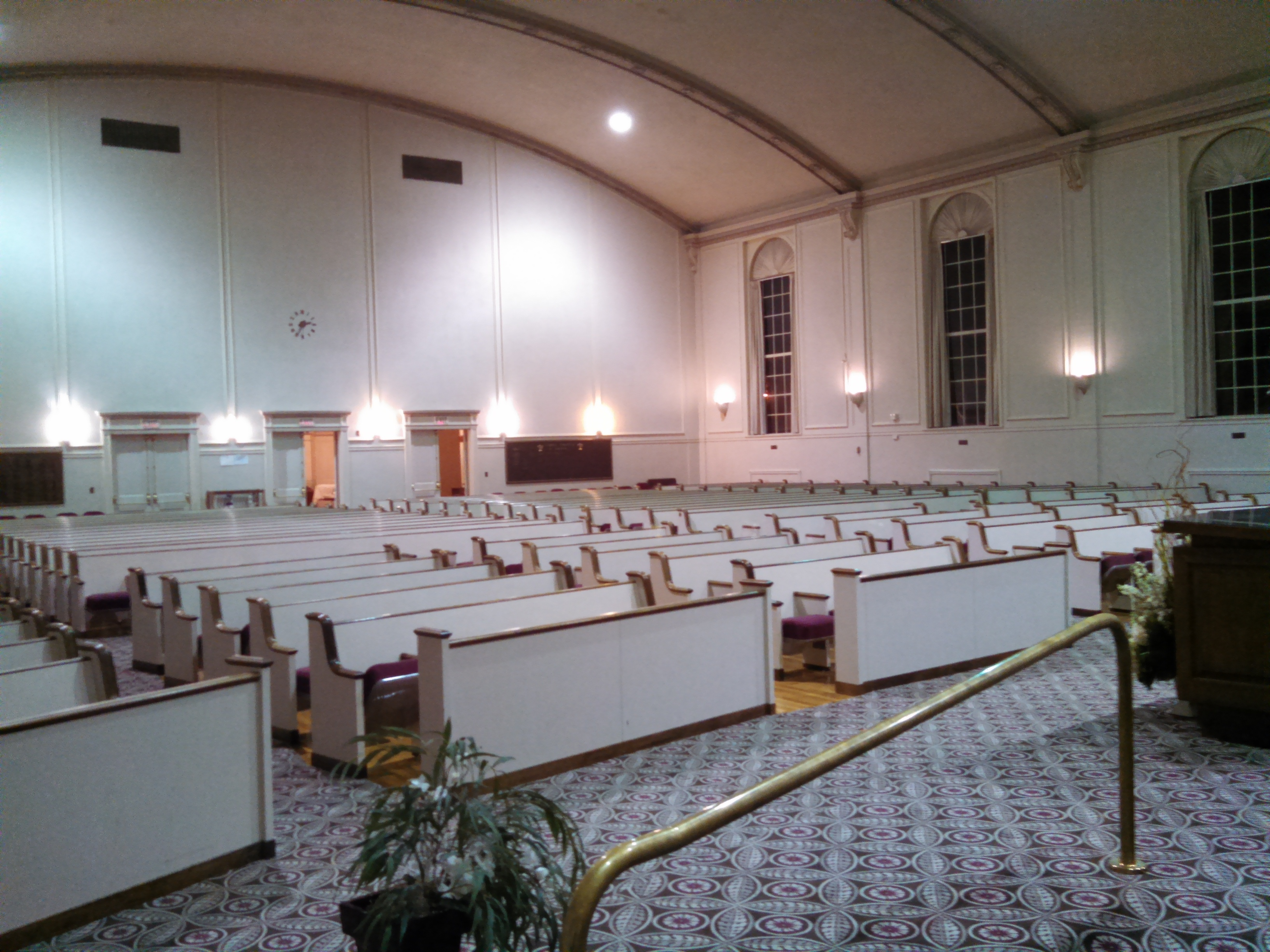
Abraham & Mae Persky Sanctuary

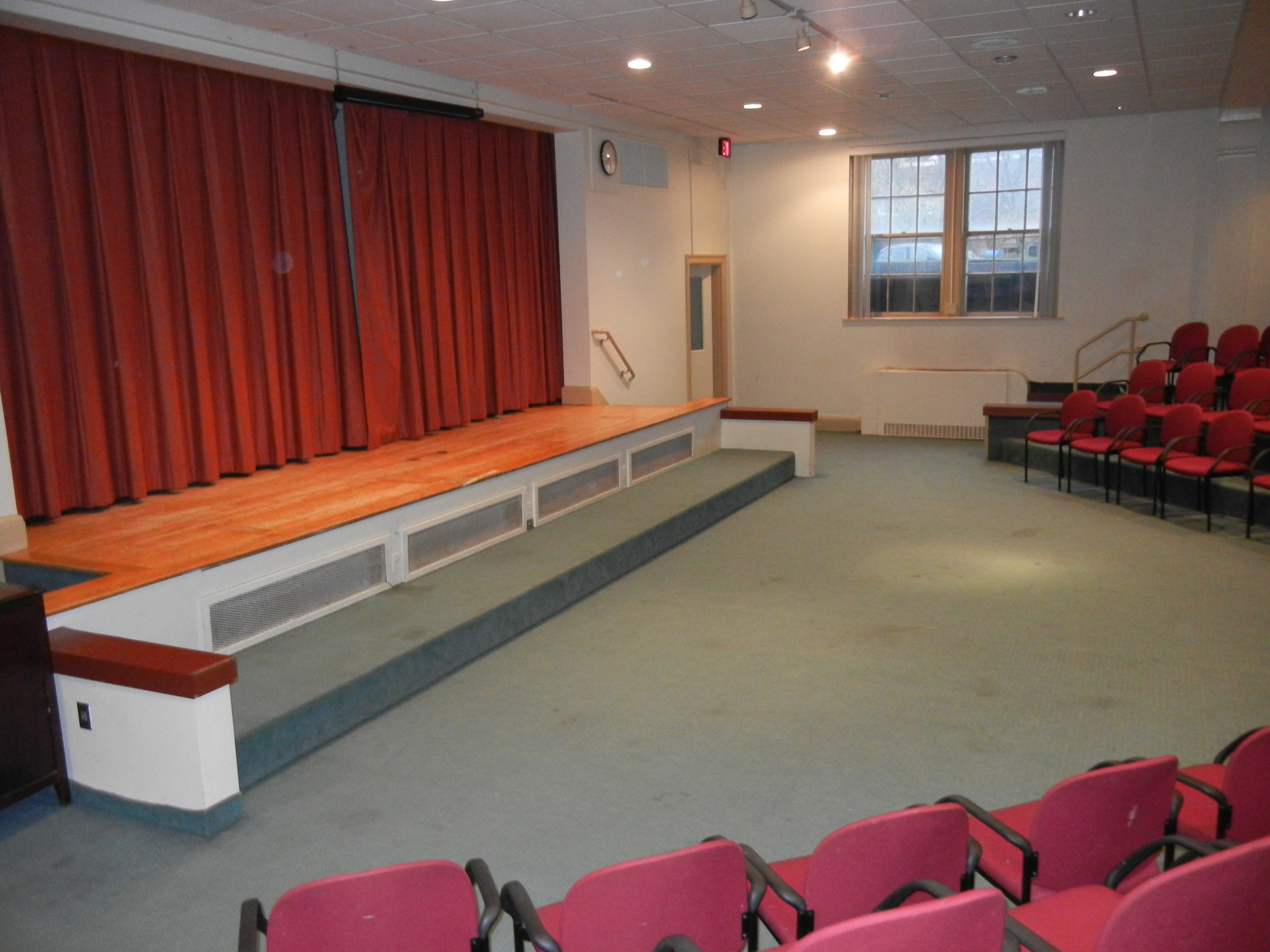
Stacey A. Cohan Youth Center

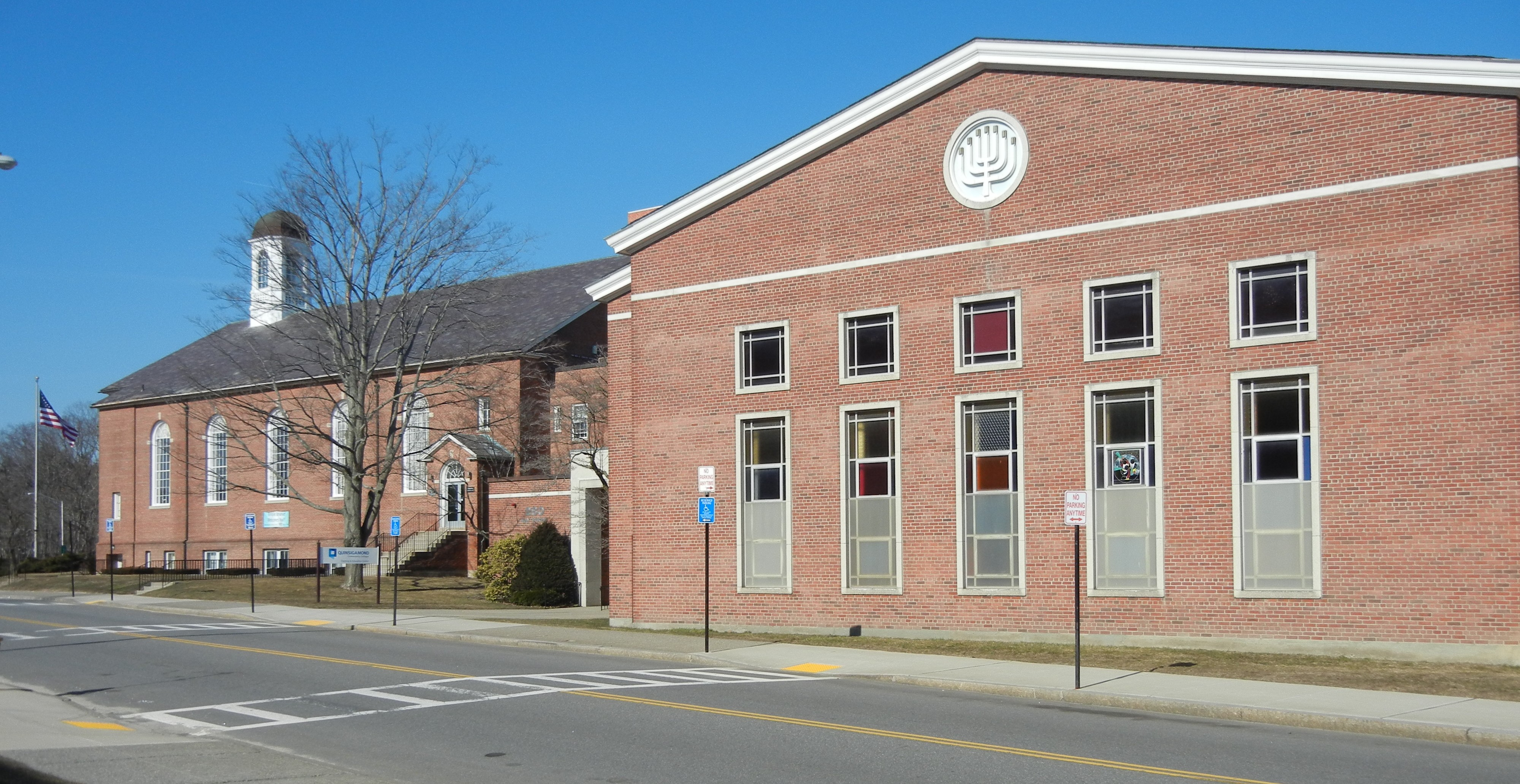
Façade with chapel and auditorium entrances

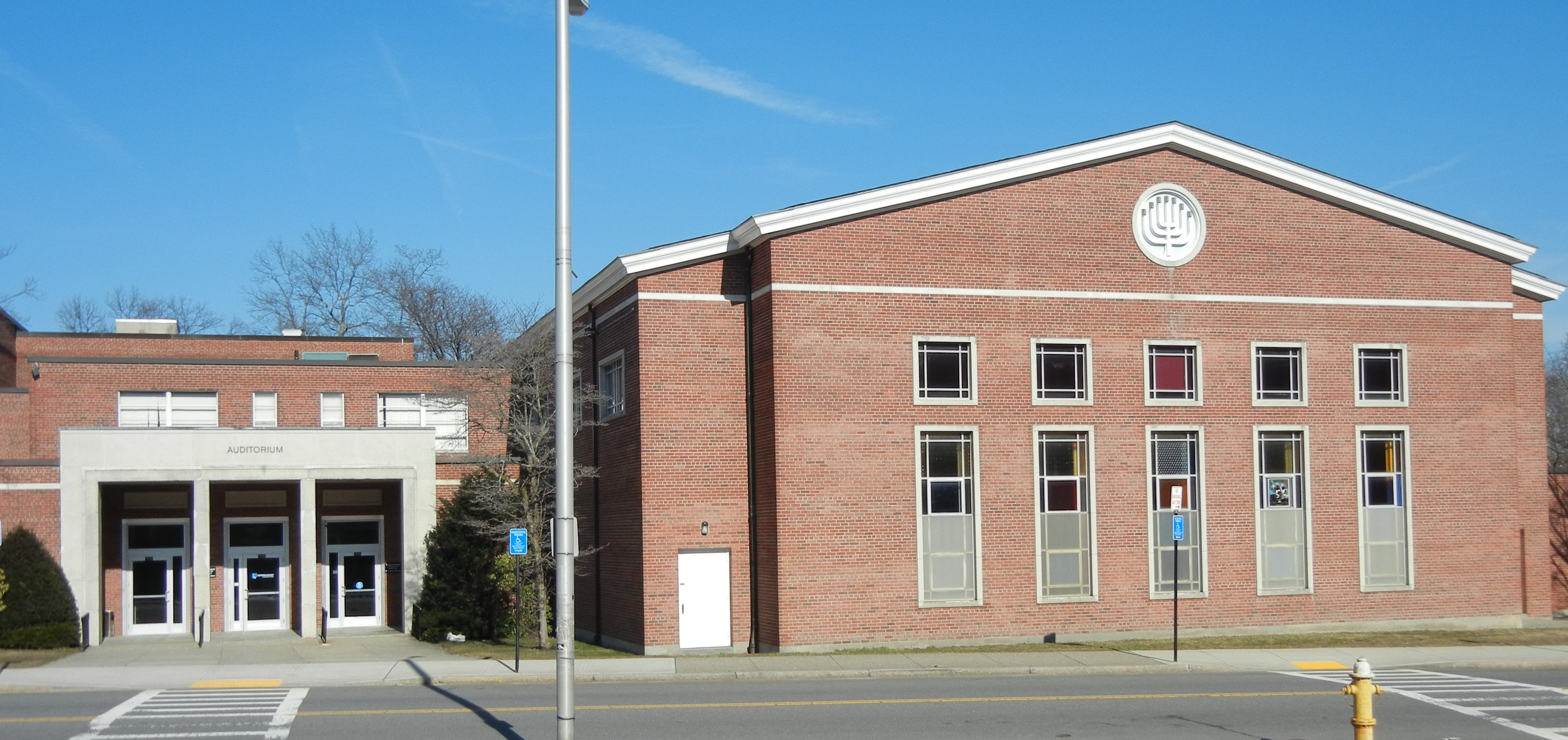
Auditorium Complex

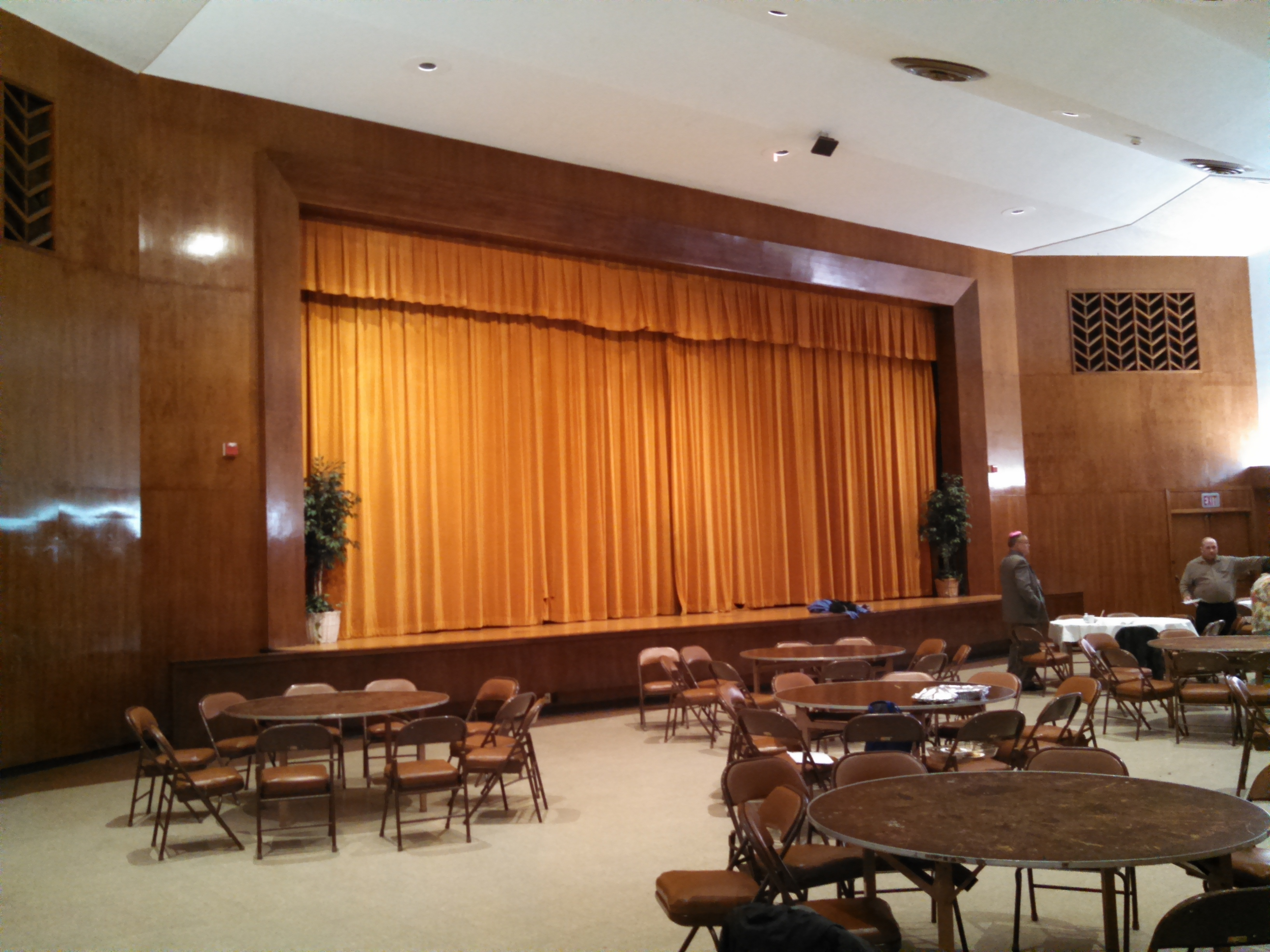
Auditorium

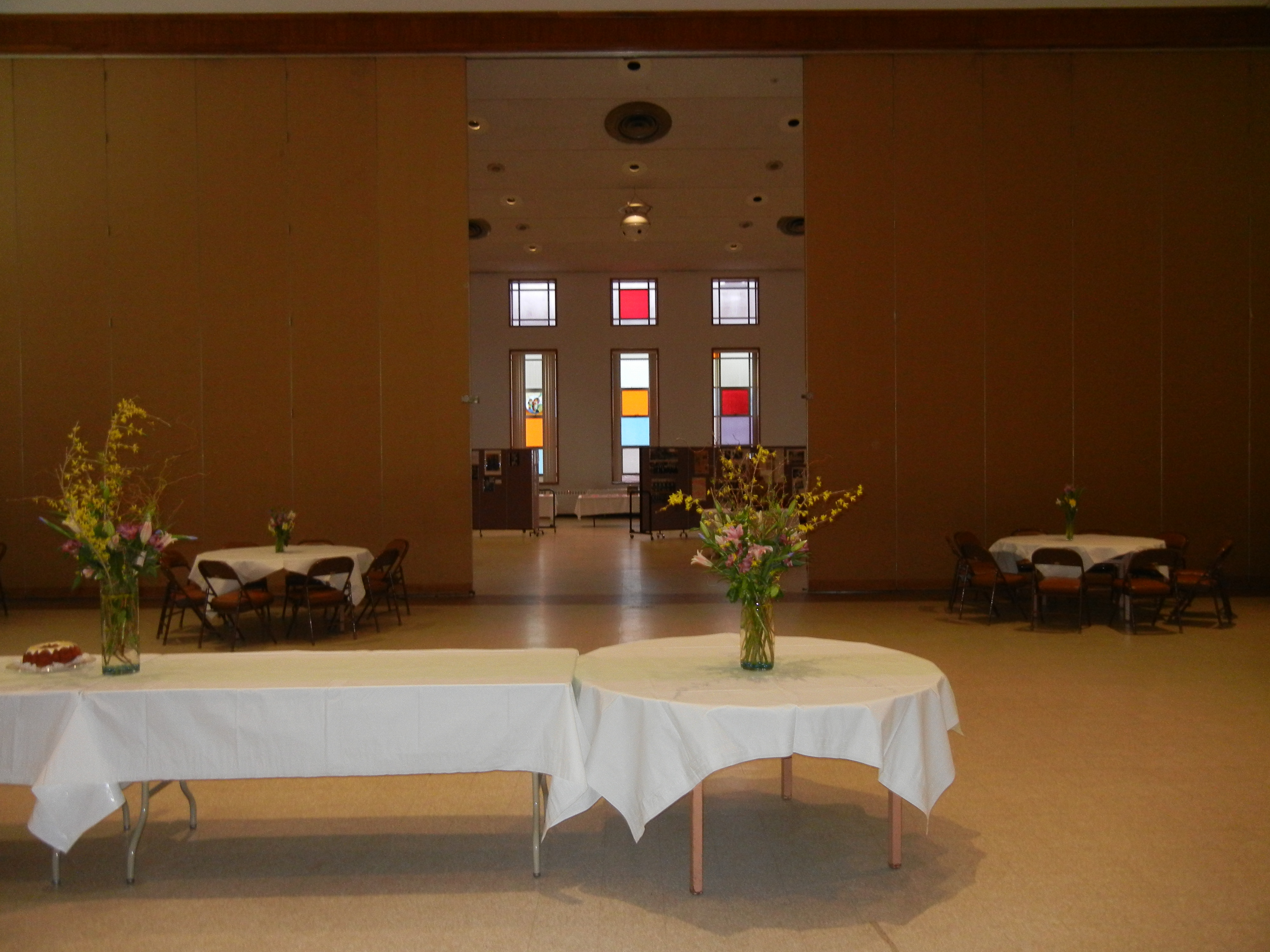
Auditorium

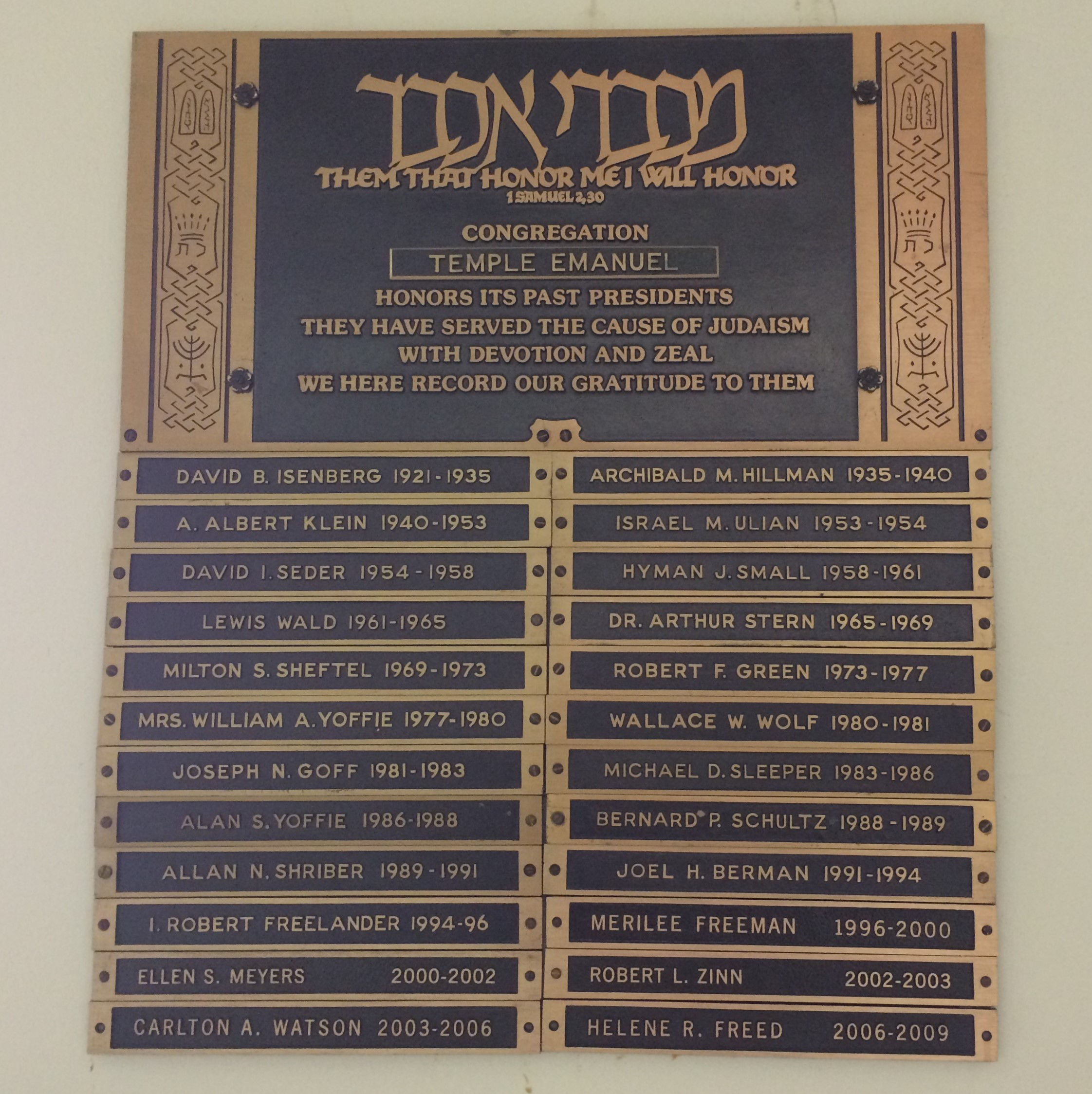
Presidents Plaque

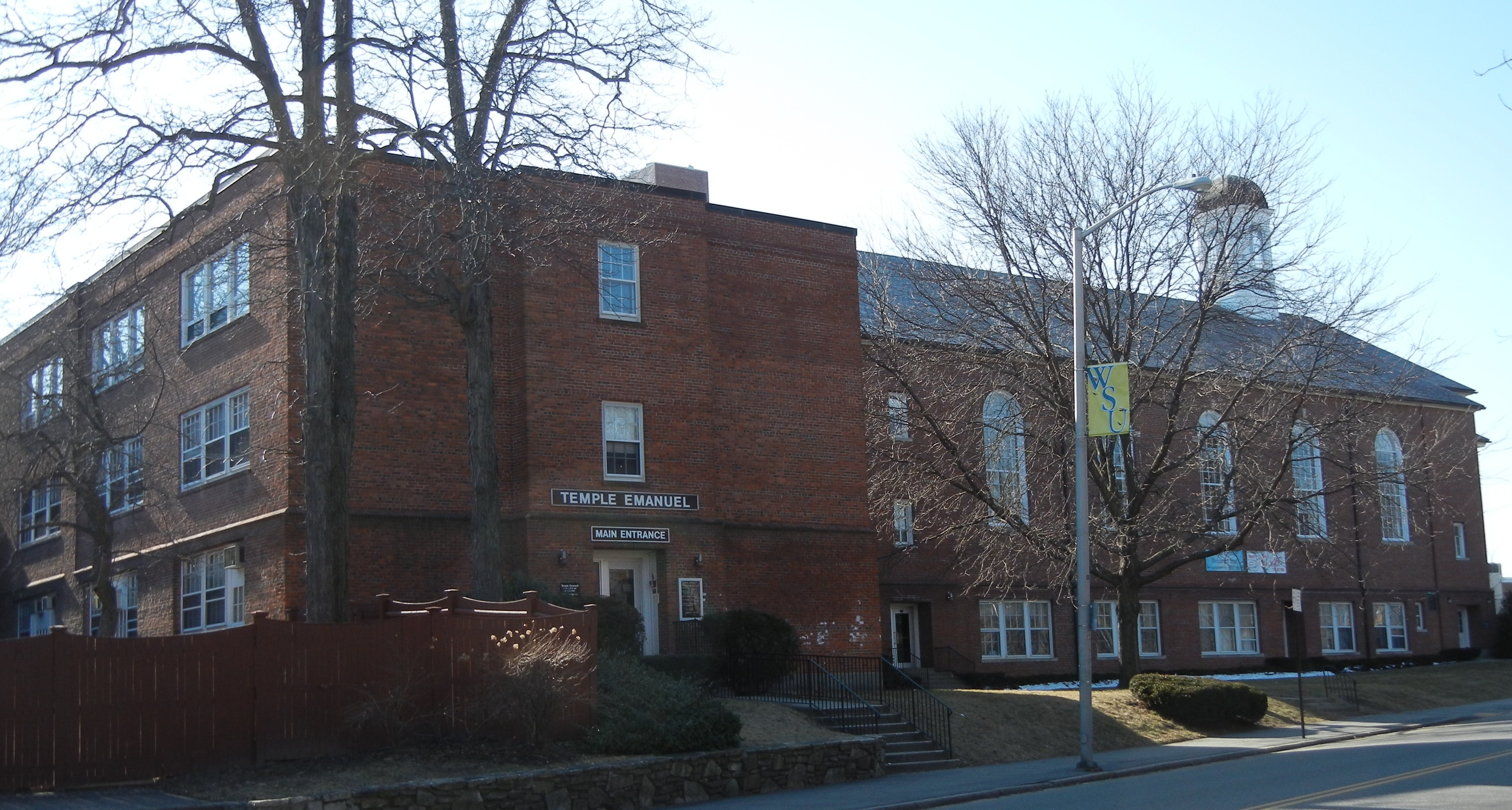
Chandler Street Entrance and Religious School wing

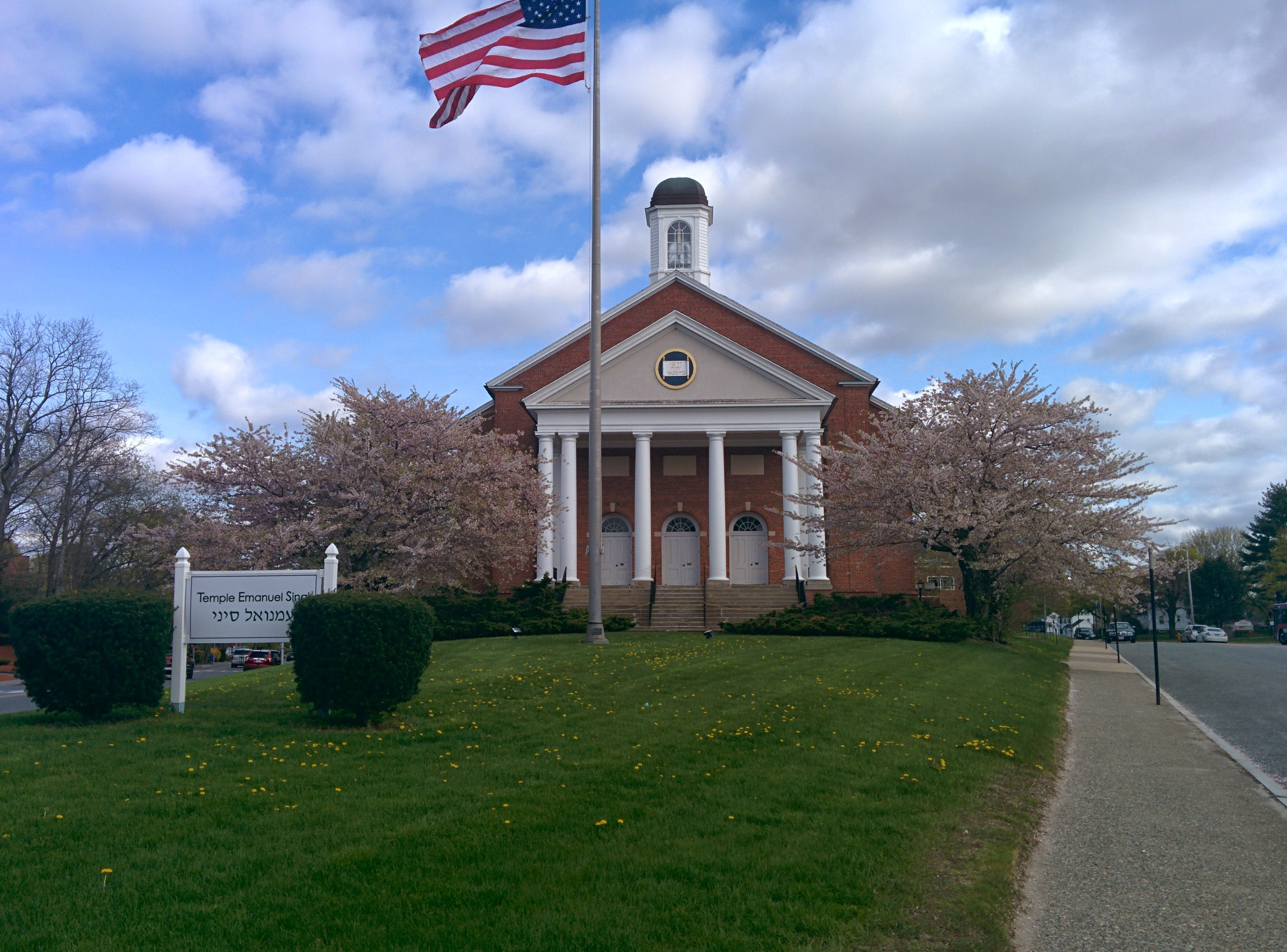
Cherry Blossoms

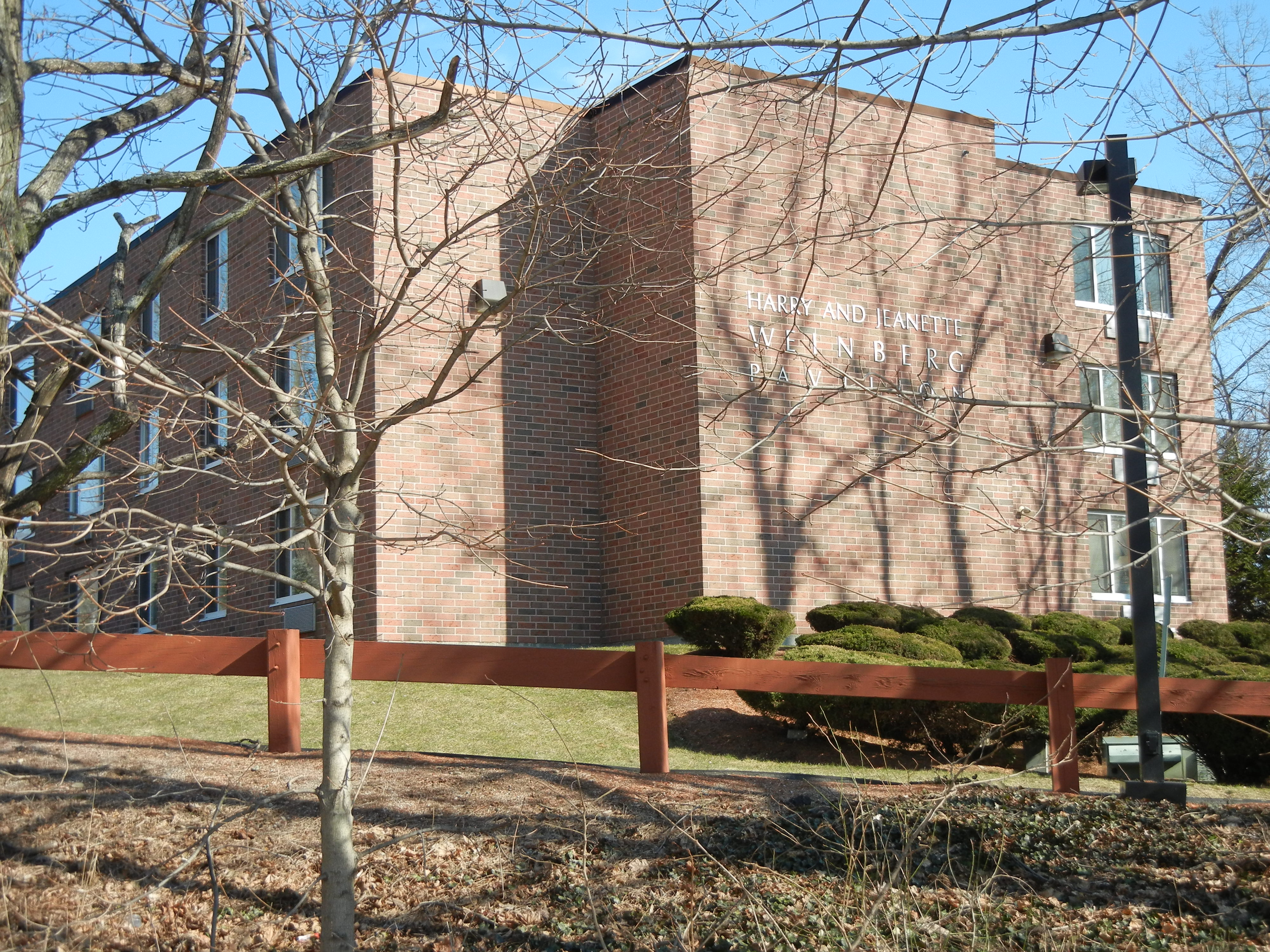
Bet Shalom Apartments (Worcester Jewish Community Housing For The Elderly, Inc.)

== See also ==
- History of the Jews in the United States

== Notes ==
- ^[note a]: Same premises at Elm Street.
- ^[note b]: Same premises at Salisbury Street.
