= Timeline of Worcester, Massachusetts =

The following is a timeline of the history of the city of Worcester, Massachusetts, United States of America.

== Prior to 19th century ==
- 1669 – Common established.
- 1719 – Town meeting house built.
- 1722 - incorporated as a town June 14, 1722.
- 1731 - On April 2, 1731, Worcester was chosen as the county seat of the newly founded Worcester County
- 1733 – Court House built.
- 1763 – Old South Meeting house built (approximate date).
- 1775
  - Post office established.
  - Massachusetts Spy newspaper relocates to Worcester.
- 1776 – July 14, first public reading of the Declaration of Independence by Isaiah Thomas.
- 1786 – Worcester Magazine begins publication.
- 1787 – First known printing of the word 'baseball' appears in A Little Pretty Pocket-book, Worcester, MA, by Isaiah Thomas, Rare Book and Special Collections, Library of Congress.
- 1792 – Second Meeting House dedicated.
- 1793 – Associate Library Company active.

== 19th century ==
- 1800 – Independent Gazetteer begins publication.
- 1801 – National Aegis newspaper begins publication.
- 1812 – American Antiquarian Society founded.
- 1818 – Worcester Agricultural Society incorporated.
- 1819 – Fraternity of Odd Fellows active.
- 1823 – Massachusetts Yeoman newspaper begins publication.
- 1824 – Town Hall built.
- 1825 – Worcester Lyceum of Natural History founded.
- 1828 – Blackstone Canal opens.
- 1829
  - Worcester County Republican newspaper begins publication.
  - Worcester County Athenaeum and Worcester Lyceum active.
- 1830
  - Worcester County Colonization Society formed.
  - Worcester Social Library active.
  - Population: 4,173.
- 1832 – Worcester Law Library Association active.
- 1833
  - Tolman carriage factory established.
  - Ezra Rice House built.
- 1834
  - St. John's Catholic Church established.
  - Worcester Palladium newspaper begins publication.
  - Worcester Academy established.
- 1835 – Harris' Circulating Library in operation.
- 1838
  - P. Young variety store established.
  - Christian Reflector newspaper begins publication.
  - Rural Cemetery is incorporated.
- 1843 – College of the Holy Cross established.
- 1840
  - Worcester County Horticultural Society formed.
  - Population: 7,497.
- 1844 – Worcester Almanac begins publication.
- 1845
  - Daily Transcript and Worcester County Gazette newspapers begin publication.
  - Classical and English High School opens.
- 1847 – Worcester Telegraph and Worcester Daily Journal newspapers begin publication.
- 1848
  - Worcester (a town) becomes the City of Worcester.
  - Levi Lincoln Jr. becomes mayor.
  - City hosts Whig State Convention.
- 1849 – Oread Institute founded.
- 1850
  - National Women's Rights Convention held in city.
  - Population: 17,049.
- 1851 – Daily Morning Transcript newspaper begins publication.
- 1852 – Worcester Young Men's Christian Association founded.
- 1853
  - Worcester Rhetorical Society incorporated.
  - Emmanuel Baptist church built.
  - Agricultural Fairgrounds in operation (approximate date).
- 1854
  - Hope Cemetery laid out.
  - Mission Chapel built.
- 1856 – Worcester Employment Society and Highland Military School founded.
- 1857
  - Mechanics Hall built.
  - Ladies' Collegiate Institute opens.
- 1858 – Worcester Music Festival begins; Frohsinn Gesang Verein chorus formed.
- 1860 – A.H. Word's Select Circulating Library active.
- 1862 – Free Public Library building constructed on Elm Street.
- 1864 – Dale Hospital opens.
- 1865 – Worcester County Free Institute of Industrial Science founded.
- 1866 – Worcester County Homoeopathic Medical Society formed.
- 1868 – Chamberlain's Circulating Library in operation.
- 1869 – Elwood Adams hardware store in business.
- 1872 – South End commercial circulating library in operation.
- 1873 – Home for Aged Women opens.
- 1874
  - Worcester Normal School established.
  - Soldiers' Monument dedicated.
  - Cathedral of Saint Paul built.
- 1875
  - Worcester Society of Antiquity formed.
  - Train station built.
- 1876 – Grand Army of the Republic Hall built.
- 1877 – Irvings base ball team active.
- 1879 – Worcester Worcesters base ball team formed (approximate date).
- 1880 – First perfect game in Major League Baseball history pitched by Lee Richmond, pitcher for the Worcester Worcesters.
- 1884
  - Worcester bicentennial.
  - St. Peters Catholic Church built.
- 1885 – Frederick Daniels House built.
- 1886
  - Worcester Daily Telegram newspaper begins publication.
  - Hatters' and Furnishers' Association formed.
- 1887
  - Clark University founded.
  - Becker's Business College formed.
  - Pilgrim Congregational Church built.
  - Horseshoers' Union organized.
- 1888 – St. Mark's Episcopal Church built.
- 1889 – Old South Church built, corner Main and Wellington St.
- 1891 – Lothrop's Opera House opens.
- 1892 – New English High School opens.
- 1894 – St. Matthew's Episcopal Church and South Unitarian Church built.
- 1895
  - Bay State Bank was incorporated and remains the only Worcester-based bank in the City.
  - Union Congregational Church built.
- 1897 – Worcester Art Museum School established.
- 1898
  - Worcester Art Museum building opens.
  - Worcester City Hall built.
- 1899 – Worcester Business Institute established.

== 20th century ==
- 1900
  - Population: 118,421.
  - Bancroft School established.
  - Bancroft Tower in Salisbury Park erected.
- 1901 – Worcester Magazine begins publication.
- 1904
  - Assumption College established.
  - Shaarai Torah congregation incorporated.
- 1906
  - Boulevard Park opens.
  - Worcester Lunch Car and Carriage Manufacturing Company founded.
  - Labor News begins publication.
  - Worcester Domestic Science School established.
- 1907 – Slater Building constructed.
- 1910
  - Population: 145,986.
  - April 3: President William Howard Taft visits Mechanics Hall to speak about labor issues to a meeting of Brotherhoods in Train Service
- 1911 – Train station rebuilt.
- 1912
  - Bancroft Hotel built.
  - Burnside Fountain installed.
- 1913 – Greendale Branch Library, Quinsigamond Branch Library and South Worcester Branch Library built.
- 1914
  - Park Building constructed.
  - September – Fashion Week.
- 1921 – Temple Emanuel founded.
- 1923 – Worcester Panthers baseball team active.
- 1924
  - Fitton Field stadium opens.
  - Congregation Beth Israel founded.
- 1927
  - Foley Stadium built.
  - Worcester Airport opens.
- 1931 – Higgins Armory Museum opens.
- 1938 – Worcester Junior College established.
- 1950 – Roman Catholic Diocese of Worcester established.
- 1952 – Massachusetts Route 146 highway constructed.
- 1953 – Tornado.
- 1954 – Worcester Area Sports Car Club formed.
- 1955 – Commerce Bank & Trust Company founded.
- 1962 – University of Massachusetts Medical School established.
- 1963
  - Smiley created by Harvey Ross Ball.
  - Quinsigamond Community College founded.
- 1968 – Worcester Consortium of Universities founded.
- 1971
  - Worcester Center Galleria opens.
  - Worcester Science Center and Mechanics Tower built.
- 1974
  - Worcester Regional Transit Authority established.
  - Worcester Plaza built.
- 1975 – Joseph D. Early becomes U.S. representative for Massachusetts's 3rd congressional district.
- 1976 – Worcester Magazine begins publication.
- 1980 – New England Summer Nationals automotive festival begins.
- 1982 – Centrum arena opens.
- 1983 – Interstate 190 highway in operation.
- 1986 – Telegram & Gazette newspaper formed.
- 1987
  - Greater Worcester Land Trust founded.
  - United States District Court for the District of Massachusetts division opens.
  - Sister city relationship established with Pushkin, Russia.
- 1988
  - Jordan Levy becomes mayor.
  - Worcester Historical Museum opens on Elm Street.
- 1991 – Sky Mark Tower built.
- 1994
  - Raymond Mariano becomes mayor.
  - Worcester Women's History Project founded.
  - Worcester IceCats hockey team active.
- 1996
  - City website online (approximate date).
  - Worcester Sharks ice hockey team active.
  - Music Worcester Inc. formed.
- 1997 – Jim McGovern becomes U.S. representative for Massachusetts's 3rd congressional district.
- 1999 – Worcester Cold Storage Warehouse fire.

== 21st century ==
- 2000
  - Massachusetts College of Pharmacy and Health Sciences campus opens.
  - Union Station renovated.
- 2001 – Worcester Public Library main branch renovated.
- 2002 – Tim Murray becomes mayor.
- 2004 – Worcester IceCats hockey team sold and moves out of Worcester.
- 2005 – Worcester Tornadoes baseball team formed.
- 2007 – Konstantina Lukes becomes mayor.
- 2010 – Joseph C. O'Brien becomes mayor.
- 2011 – Worcester Hydra soccer team founded.
- 2012 –
  - Joseph Petty becomes mayor.
  - Worcester Tornados baseball team's final season.
- 2013 – Higgin's Armory Museum closes.
- 2014 – Worcester Bravehearts baseball team formed.
- 2015 – Worcester Sharks hockey team moves to San Jose.
- 2017 – Worcester Railers hockey team formed.
- 2018 – Massachusetts Pirates indoor football team formed.

== See also ==
- Worcester history
- List of mayors of Worcester, Massachusetts
- Worcester, Massachusetts Firsts
- Media in Worcester, Massachusetts
- Timelines of other municipalities in the Greater Boston area of Massachusetts: Boston, Cambridge, Haverhill, Lawrence, Lowell, Lynn, New Bedford, Salem, Somerville, Waltham

== Images ==
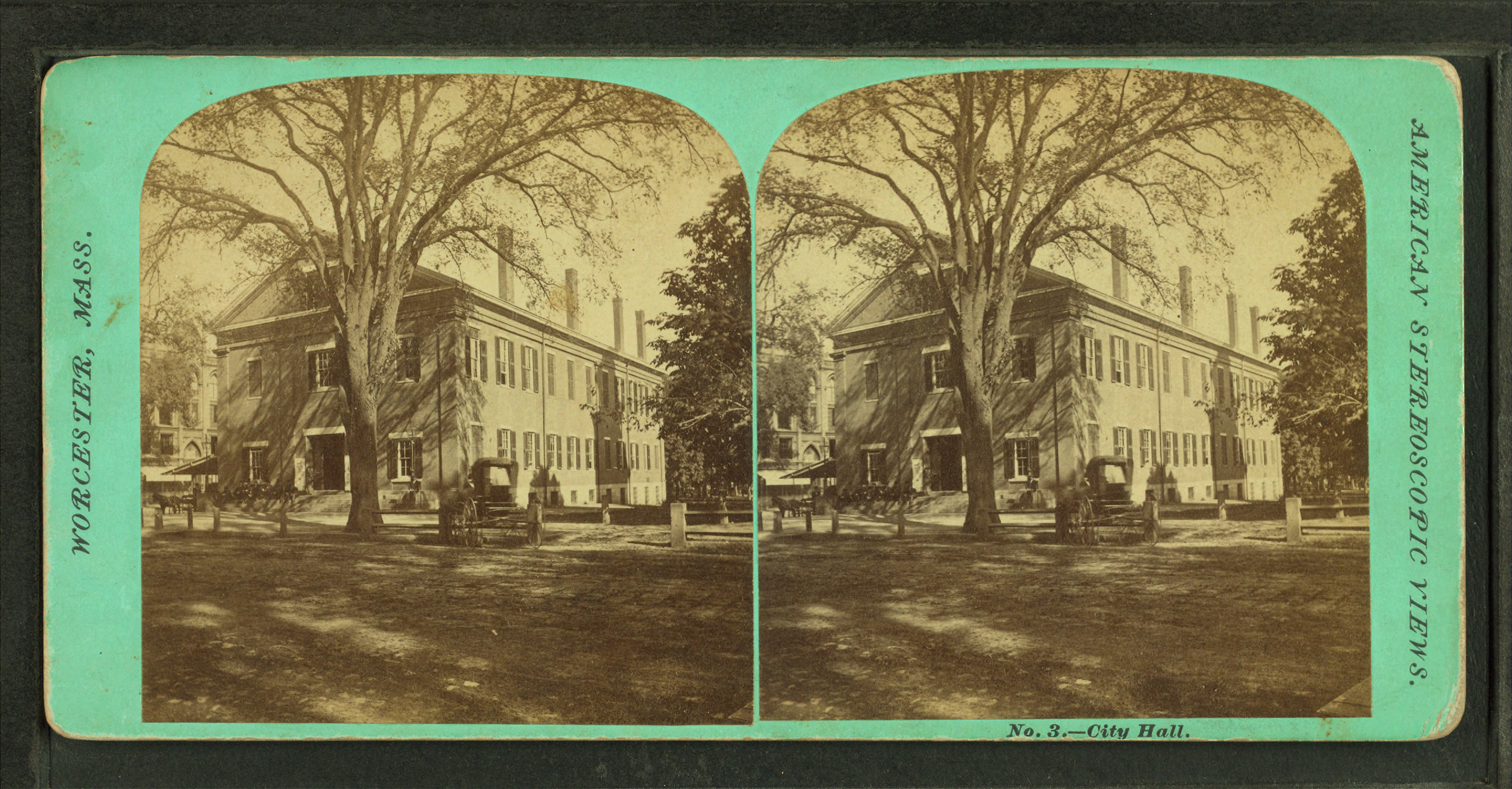
Town Hall, corner Main and Front St., built 1824

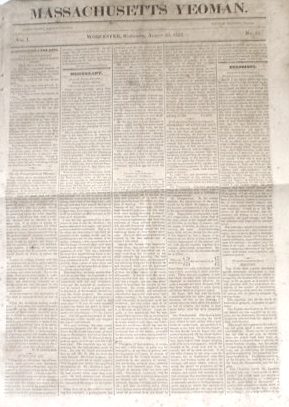
Massachusetts Yeoman newspaper published in Worcester ca.1820s

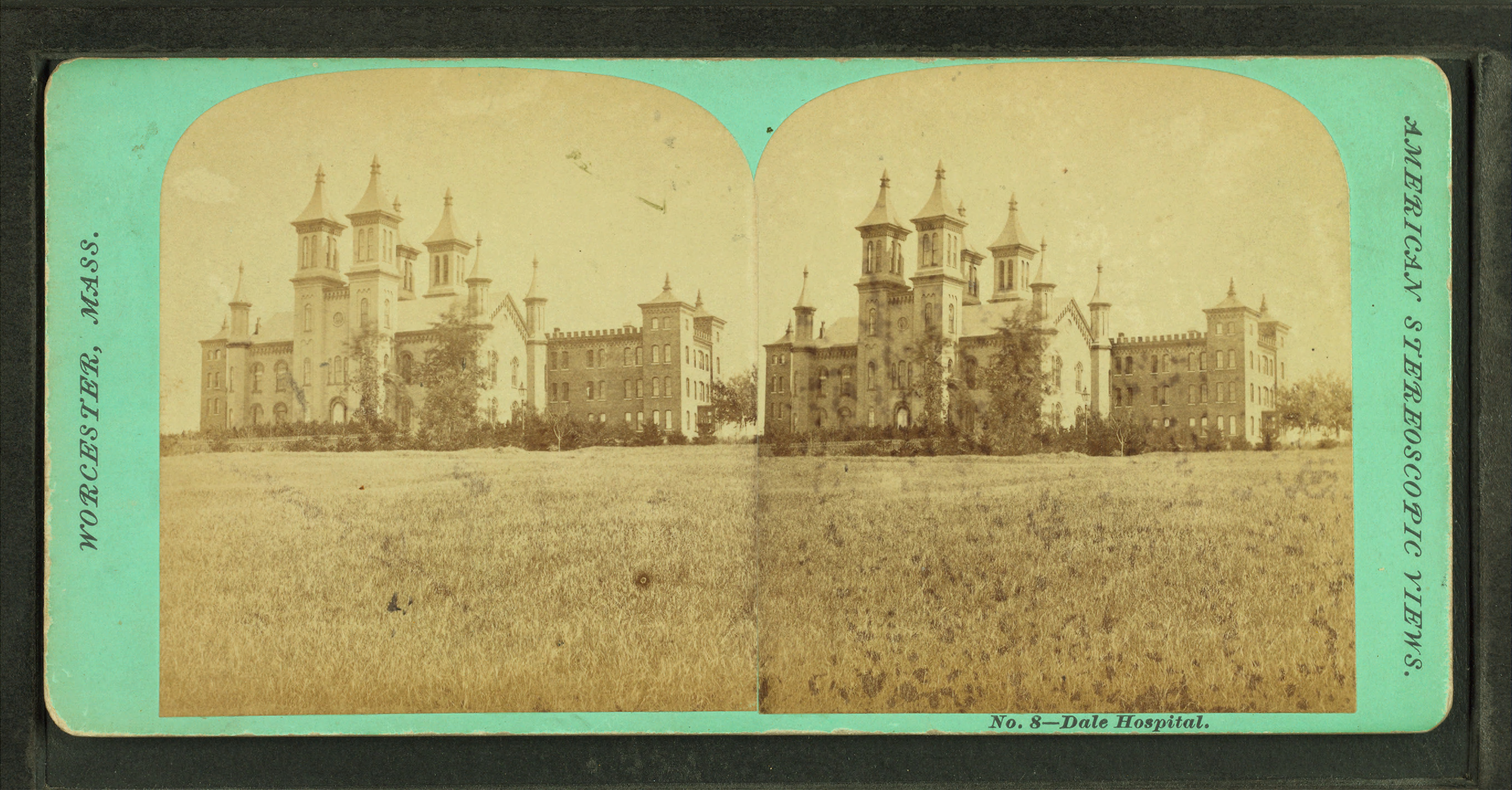
Dale Hospital, opened in 1864

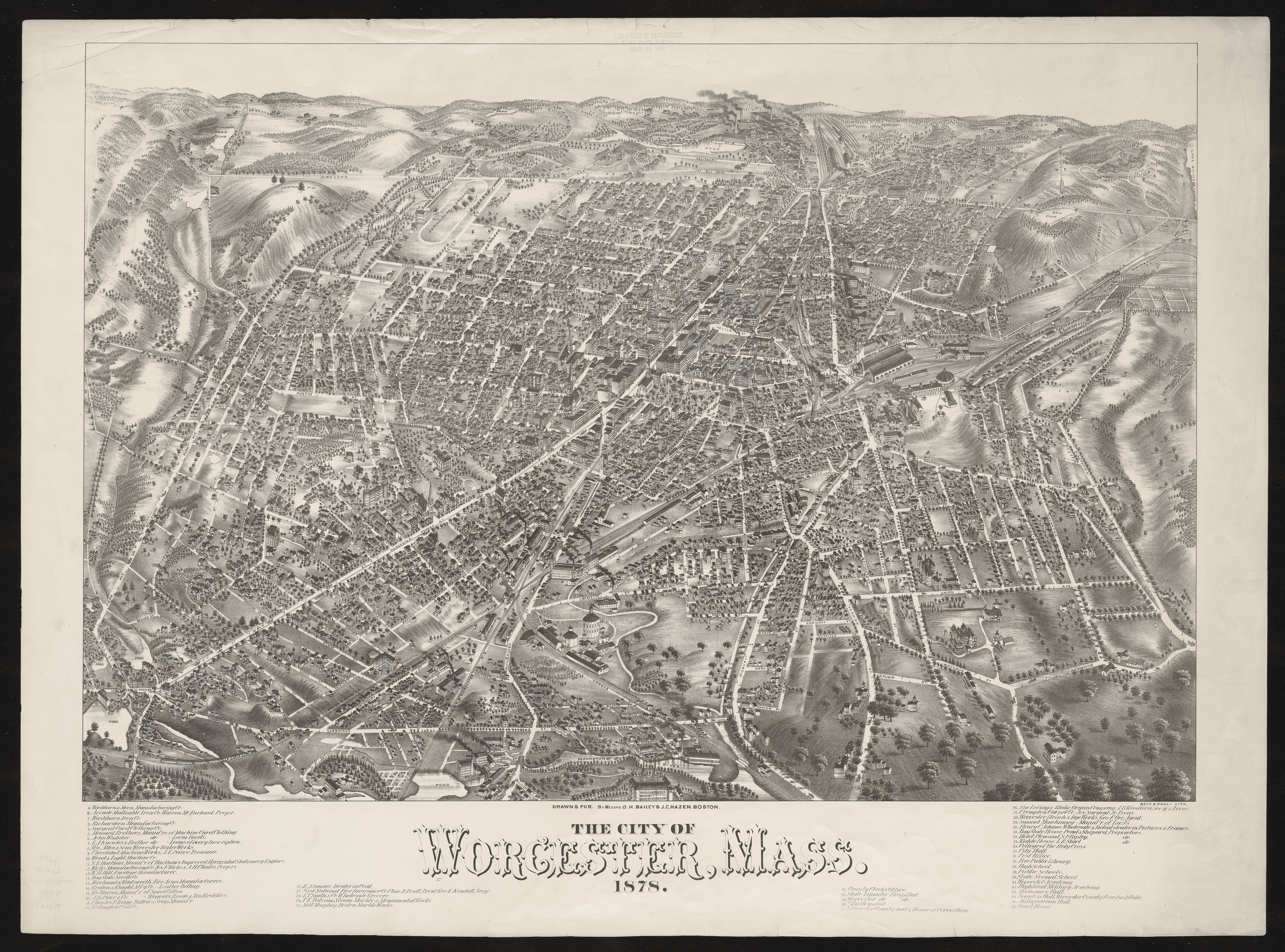
Map of Worcester, 1878

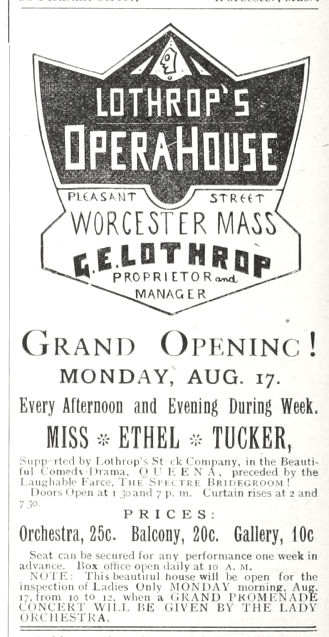
Lothrop's Opera House, 1891 advertisement

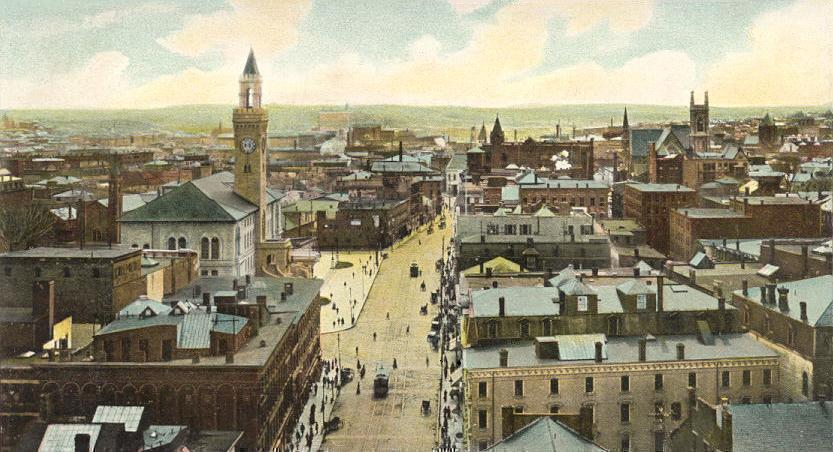
Worcester, ca.1905

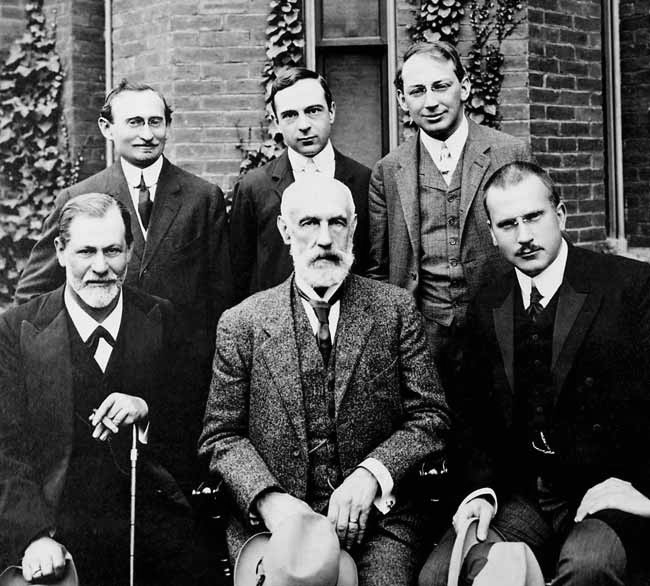
Group photo 1909 in front of Clark University. Front row: Sigmund Freud, G. Stanley Hall, Carl Jung; back row: Abraham A. Brill, Ernest Jones, Sándor Ferenczi

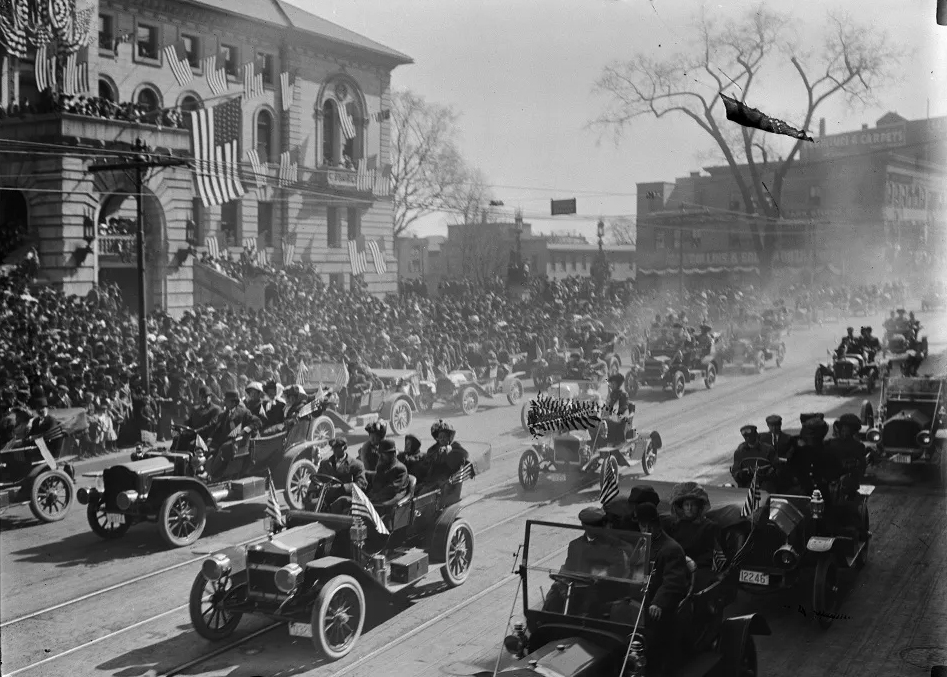
"President Taft and Governor Draper passing Worcester City Hall, April 3, 1910"

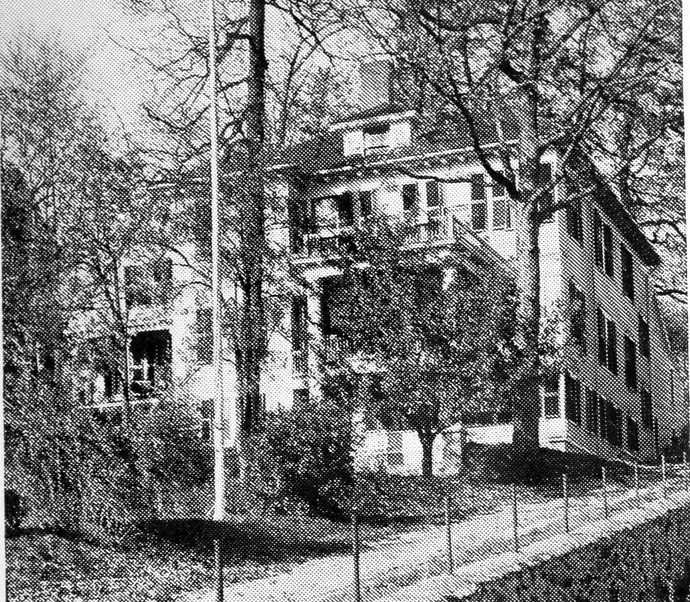
Worcester Domestic Science School, 1914

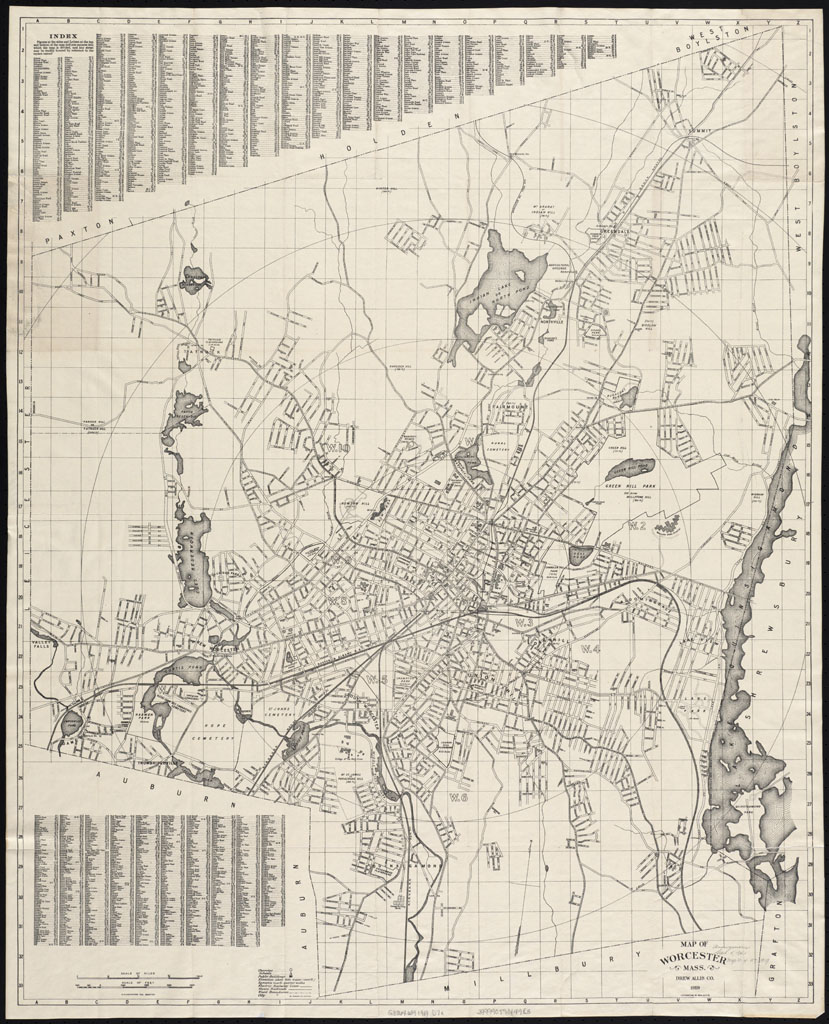
Map of Worcester, 1919

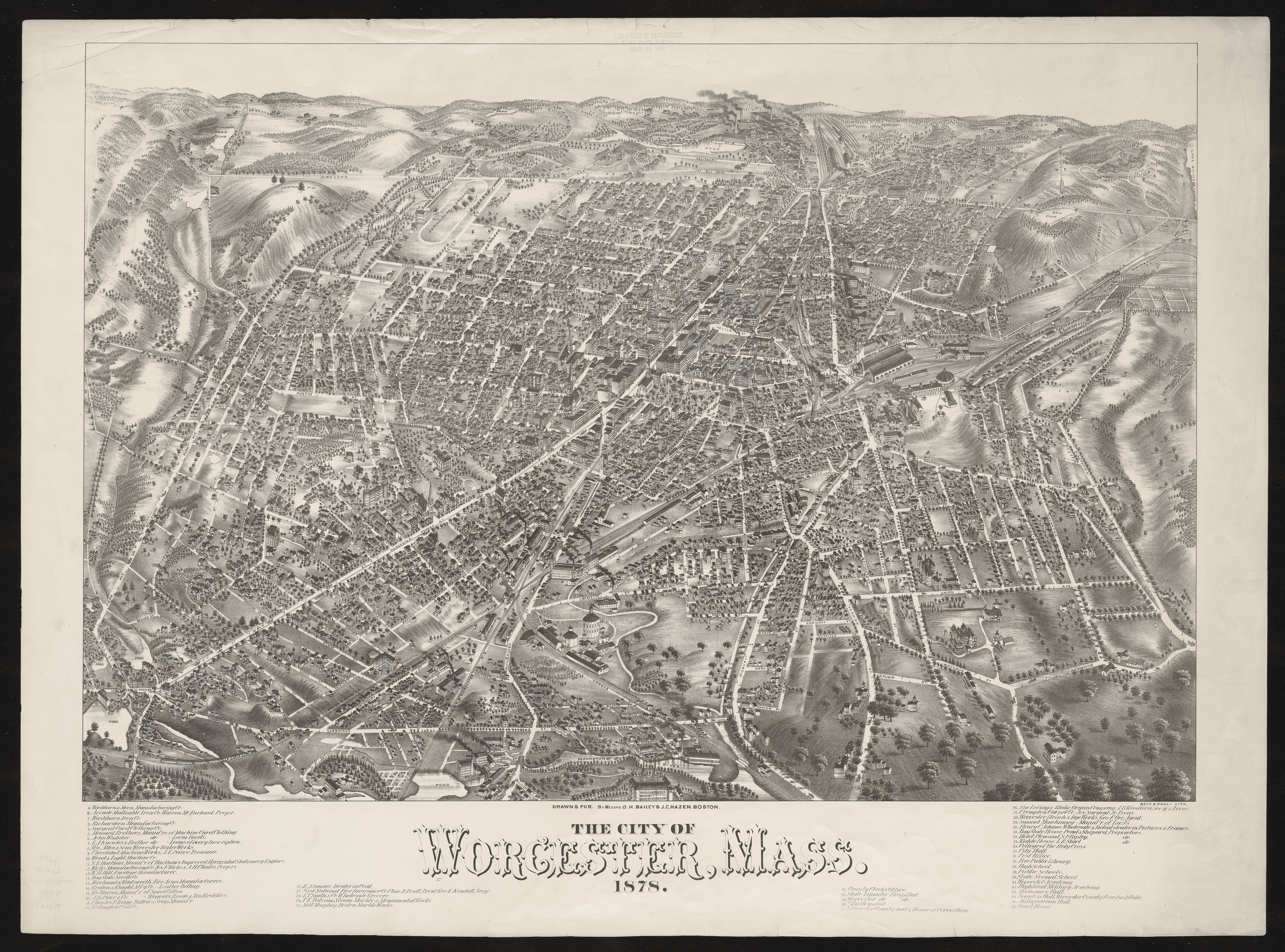
High-resolution birds-eye-view map of Worcester in 1878

== Bibliography ==
Published in the 18th-19th century

- Peter Whitney (1793), History of the County of Worcester, in the Commonwealth of Massachusetts, Worcester, Massachusetts: Isaiah Thomas, OL 6905743M
- Henry J. Howland (1853), Worcester Almanac, Directory, and Business Advertiser, for 1854, Worcester: H.J. Howland, OCLC 785826916, OL 25278704M
- Heart of the Commonwealth, or, Worcester as it is, Worcester, Massachusetts: Henry J. Howland, 1856, OL 14011107M
- Henry J. Howland (1861), Worcester Almanac, Directory, and Business Advertiser, Worcester: H.J. Howland, OCLC 785827805, OL 25278671M
- Henry J. Howland (1865), Worcester Directory, Worcester: H.J. Howland, OCLC 18580655, OL 25285405M
- Claflin; Black (1870), Five hundred past and present citizens of Worcester, Mass, G. R. Peckham, OCLC 1600205, OL 14008064M
- Franklin P. Rice (1884), The Worcester Book: a diary of noteworthy events in Worcester, Massachusetts, from 1657 to 1883, Worcester: Putnam, Davis and Co., OCLC 6676339, OL 7202093M
- 1684, 1884: Celebration of the two hundredth anniversary of the naming of Worcester, October 14 and 15, 1884, Worcester, Mass: Printed by order of the City Council, 1885, OL 13988362M
- City of Worcester, Massachusetts: its Public Buildings and its Business, 1886, Worcester: Sanford & Davis, 1886, OL 14050449M
- Baynes, T. S.; Smith, W. R., eds. (1888). "Worcester (3.)" . Encyclopædia Britannica. Vol. 24 (9th ed.). New York: Charles Scribner's Sons.
- Franklin Pierce Rice (1893), Dictionary of Worcester and Vicinity, Worcester: F. S. Blanchard & Co., OL 14050717M
- Franklin P. Rice, ed. (1899), Worcester of eighteen hundred and ninety-eight, Worcester, Mass: F. S. Blanchard, OCLC 404208, OL 14048656M

Published in the 20th century

- "Worcester Magazine". 1. Worcester Board of Trade. 1901.. See also: v.3 (1902); v.6 (1903); v.14 (1911); v.15 (1912); v.19 (1916)
- "Worcester (Massachusetts)" . Encyclopædia Britannica. Vol. 28 (11th ed.). 1910. pp. 822–823.
- "Worcester", Handbook of New England, Boston: Porter E. Sargent, 1916, OCLC 16726464
- Charles L. Nichols (1918), Bibliography of Worcester (2nd ed.), Worcester: Priv. print., OL 7058897M
- Worcester Bank & Trust Company (1922), Historic events of Worcester, Worcester, Massachusetts, OCLC 2973056, OL 6642342M
- Richards Standard Atlas of the city of Worcester, Massachusetts. L.J. Richards & Co. 1922 – via State Library of Massachusetts.
- R. W. G. Vail, ed. (1936). "Worcester". Bibliotheca Americana. Vol. 29. New York. OCLC 13972268.
- Federal Writers' Project (1937), "Worcester", Massachusetts: a Guide to its Places and People, American Guide Series, Boston: Houghton Mifflin, hdl:2027/mdp.39015014440781
- Ory Mazar Nergal, ed. (1980), "Worcester, MA", Encyclopedia of American Cities, New York: E.P. Dutton, OL 4120668M

Published in the 21st century

- "Long a College Town, Worcester Now Looks the Part", New York Times, January 6, 2015
