= Confession =

Statement acknowledging a hidden personal fact

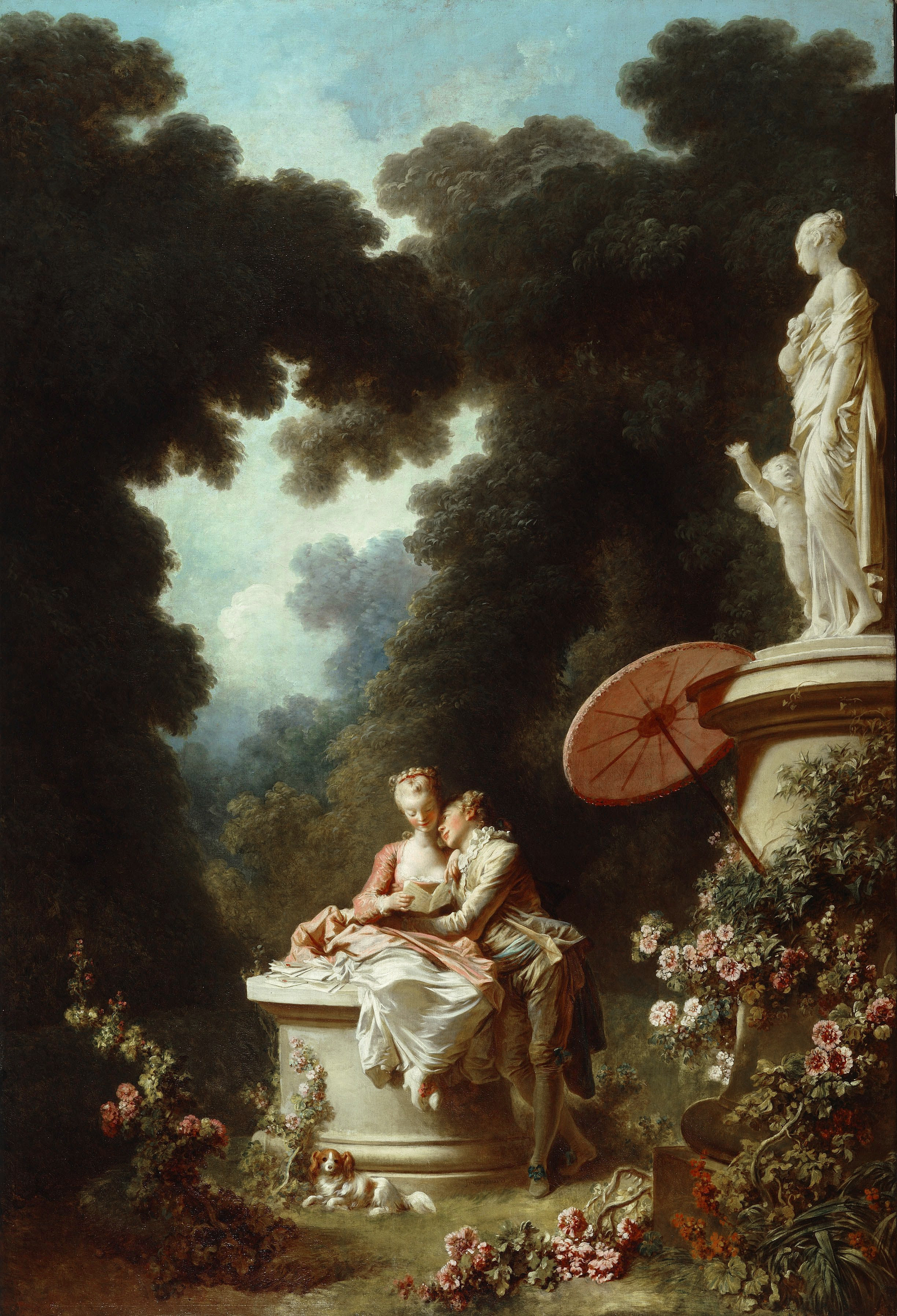
Confession of Love by Jean-Honoré Fragonard depicts a subject confessing feelings that had been concealed up to that point.

A confession is a statement – made by a person or by a group of people – acknowledging some personal fact that the person (or the group) would ostensibly prefer to keep hidden. The term presumes that the speaker is providing information that they believe the other party is not already aware of, and is frequently associated with an admission of a moral or legal wrong:

In one sense it is the acknowledgment of having done something wrong, whether on purpose or not. Thus confessional texts usually provide information of a private nature previously unavailable. What a sinner tells a priest in the confessional, the documents criminals sign acknowledging what they have done, an autobiography in which the author acknowledges mistakes, and so on, are all examples of confessional texts.

Not all confessions reveal wrongdoing, however. For example, a confession of love is often considered positive both by the confessor and by the recipient of the confession and is a common theme in literature. With respect to confessions of wrongdoing, there are several specific kinds of confessions that have significance beyond the social. A legal confession involves an admission of some wrongdoing that has a legal consequence, while the concept of confession in religion varies widely across various belief systems, and is usually more akin to a ritual by which the person acknowledges thoughts or actions considered sinful or morally wrong within the confines of the confessor's religion. In some religions, confession, the acknowledgment of sinful thoughts and actions, takes the form of an oral communication to another person. Socially, however, the term may refer to admissions that are neither legally nor religiously significant.

== Psychology ==
Confession often benefits the one who is confessing. Paul Wilkes characterizes confession as "a pillar of mental health" because of its ability to relieve anxieties associated with keeping secrets. Confessants are more likely to confess when the expected benefits outweigh the marginal costs (when the benefit of the offense to them is high, the cost to the victim is low, and the probability of information leakage is high). People may undertake social confessions in order to relieve feelings of guilt or to seek forgiveness from a wronged party, but such confessions may also serve to create social bonds between the confessant and the confessor, and may prompt the listener to reply with confessions of their own. A person may therefore confess wrongdoing to another person as a means of creating such a social bond, or of extracting reciprocal information from the other person. A confession may be made in a self-aggrandizing manner, as a way for the confessant to claim credit for a misdeed for the purpose of eliciting a reaction to that claim.

== Law ==
In law, there is an exception to the hearsay rule that allows testimony concerning someone else's confession to be admitted if the statement had a great enough tendency "to expose the declarant to civil or criminal liability". The theory is that a reasonable person would not make such a false confession. In U.S. law, a confession must be voluntary in order to be admissible. Confessions (whether forced or otherwise) may feature in formal or informal show trials.

In India sections 24 to 30 of Indian Evidence Act, 1872 deals with confession, but the word confession has not been defined in any statute. It has been judicially interpreted to mean an admission of all the ingredients of an offense. ^{Pakala Narayan Swami v. Emperor, AIR 1939 PC 47} Section 24 mandates a confession must be voluntary. Section 25 renders invalid a confession made to a police officer. Section 26 deals with confession in police custody. Section 27 provides the circumstances under which and to what extent a confession in police custody is admissible.

It reads:

When any fact is deposed to as discovered in consequence of information received from a person accused of any offense, in the custody of a police officer, so much of such information, whether it amounts to a confession or not, as relates distinctly to the fact thereby discovered, may be proved. This section does not apply to information given to police by an accused person who was not in custody at the time it was given.^{Chunda Murmu v. State of West Bengal, AIR 2012 S.C. 2160} The submission of a person to the custody of a police officer within the terms of Sec. 46(1) of the Code of Criminal Procedure is a custody within the meaning of this section. The word custody in this section does not mean physical custody by arrest.As soon as the accused or the suspected person comes into the hands of police officer, he is, in the absence of clear evidence to the contrary, no longer at liberty, and is therefore in custody within the meaning of Sec. 26 and 27.

According to section 30 of Indian Evidence Act, when two or more persons are tried jointly, a confession by one accused incriminating himself and others is relevant.

== Medicine ==
Dr. Suzanne Karan, a residency program director at the University of Rochester Department of Anesthesiology and Perioperative Medicine, initiated confessions sessions in residency education. In 2015, Dr. Karan published her research on confessions, concluding that the use of confessions sessions provided an opportunity to reflect, discuss, and admit without fear of punitive actions and allowed for early intervention on the issues that are relevant to physician trainees.

== Socialization ==
Public confessions play a role in struggle sessions and in other methods of social control and influence involving self-criticism.

== See also ==
- Atonement in Judaism
- Repentance
