= Armsby Block =

- U.S. National Register of Historic Places
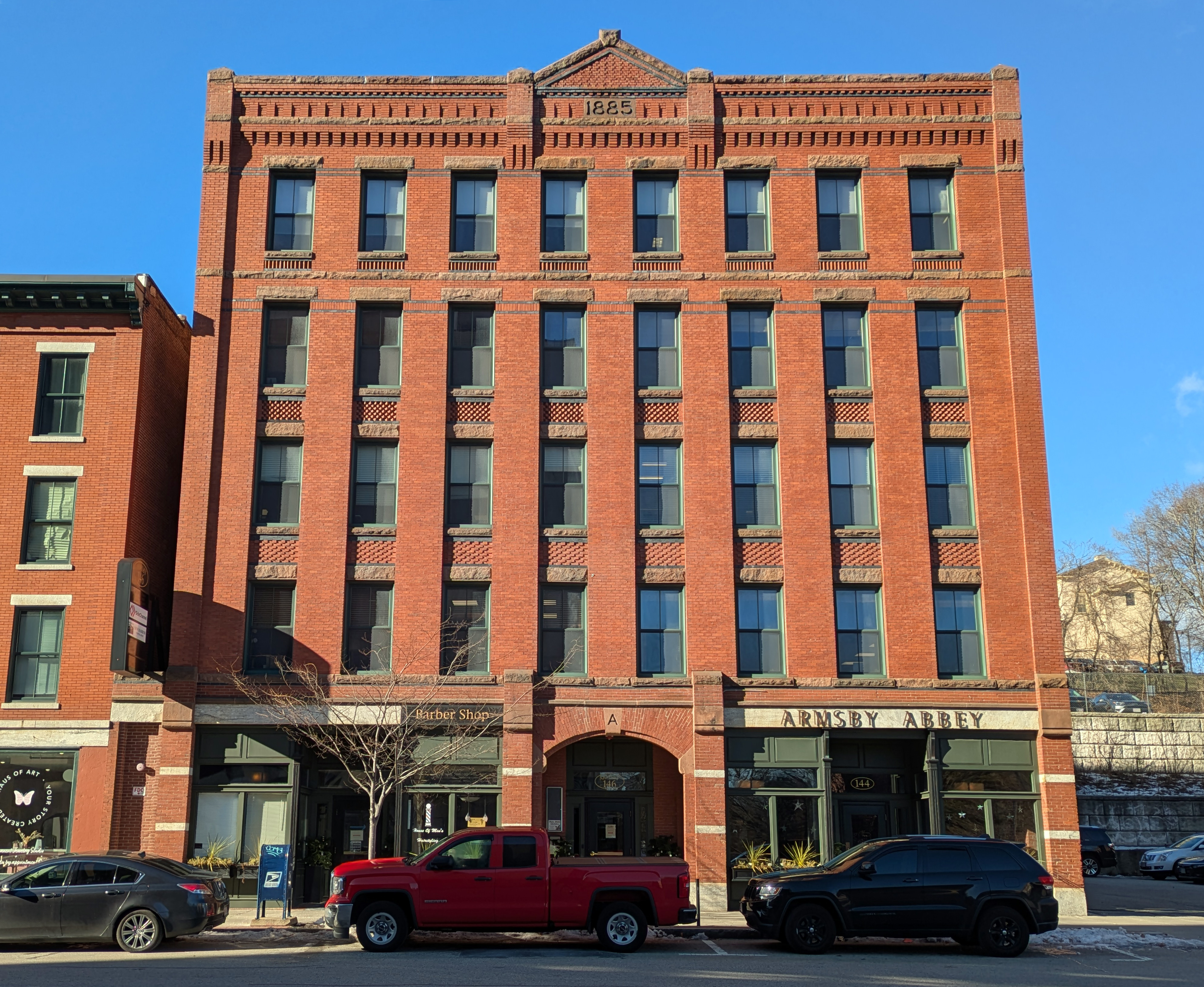
- The Armsby Block in 2025

- Location within Massachusetts Location within the United States
- Location: 144-148 Main St., Worcester, Massachusetts
- Coordinates: 42°16′7.2″N 71°48′2.4″W
- Area: less than one acre
- Built: 1885
- Architect: Earle, Stephen C.
- Architectural style: Panel Brick
- MPS: Worcester MRA
- NRHP reference No.: 80000598
- Added to NRHP: March 05, 1980

The Armsby Block, also known as the Armsby Building, is an historic mixed-use residential and commercial building at 144-148 Main Street in Worcester, Massachusetts. Built in 1885 to a design by noted local architect Stephen Earle, it is a well-preserved example of Panel Brick architecture. The building was listed on the National Register of Historic Places in 1980.

== Description and history ==
The Armsby Block is located on the west side of Main Street on the northern stretch of its downtown, adjacent to the former Elwood Adams Store. It is a five-story masonry structure, with a brick facade. The ground floor has two storefronts, which flank the recessed main building entrance. Brick piers separate each of these elements, and are topped by a frieze band and rusticated sandstone stringcourse. Upper level windows are set in rectangular openings with sandstone sills and lintels, and panels of brickwork between the second, third and fourth levels; a sandstone stringcourse separates the fourth and fifth floors. The building is crowned by a band of brick corbelling and a parapet with a central gable.

The building was designed by Stephen Earle and built in 1885. It originally housed stores on the ground floor and a boarding house on the upper floors. It was built by the estate of George Armsby, who had been secretary of Worcester's Munroe Organ Reed Company. The principal alterations to the building over time were to the storefronts; these changes have largely been reversed. It currently contains offices for the Worcester County Sheriff and a restaurant at street level.

== See also ==
- National Register of Historic Places listings in northwestern Worcester, Massachusetts
- National Register of Historic Places listings in Worcester County, Massachusetts
