= Worcester Public Library =

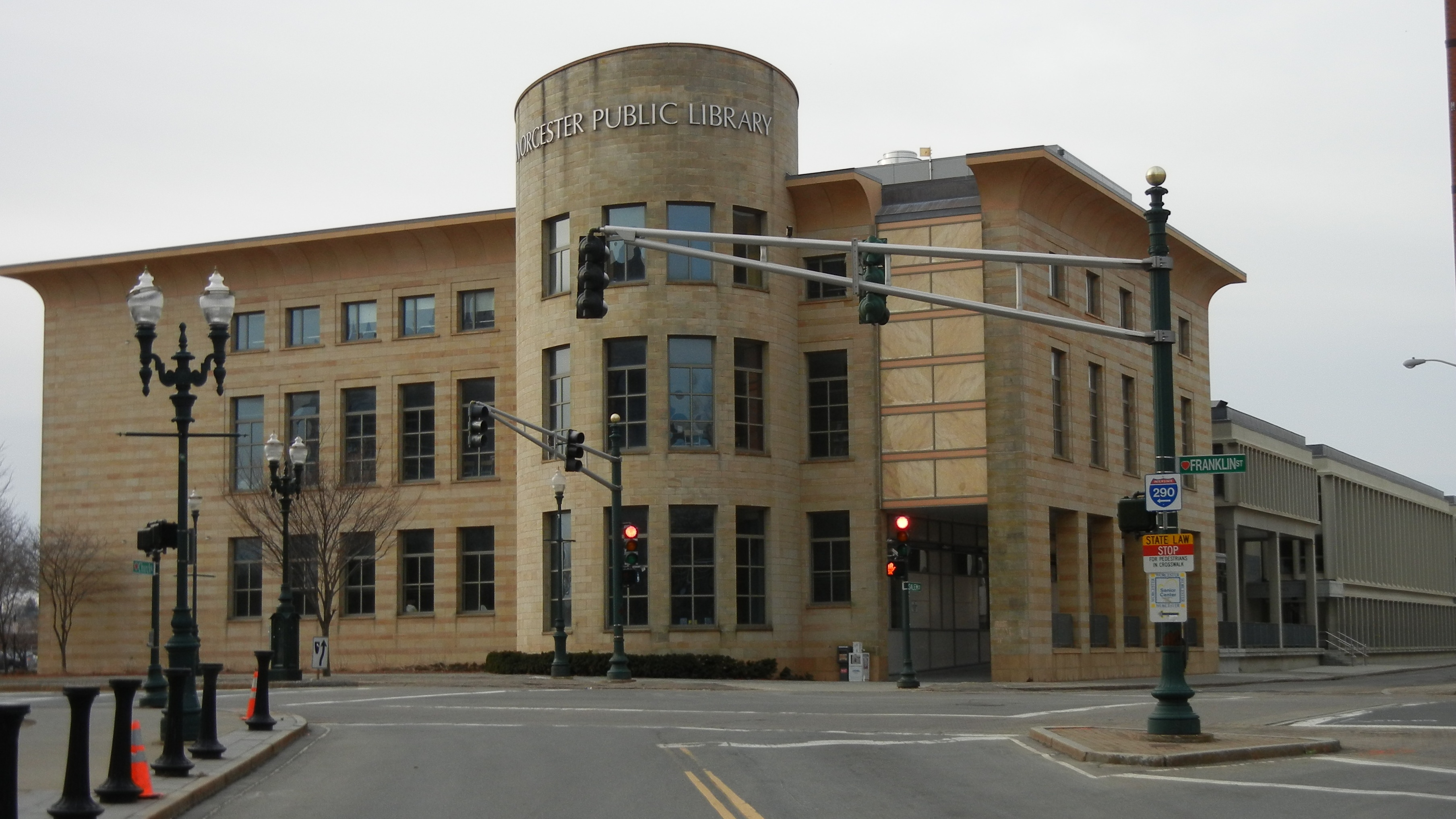
- Worcester Public Library, 2014
- 42.2604°N 71.8004°W
- Location: Worcester, Massachusetts, United States
- Type: Public library
- Established: 1859; 167 years ago

Other information
- Website: mywpl.org

Worcester Public Library (formerly known as the "Worcester Free Public Library") is a public library in downtown Worcester, Massachusetts. It was founded in 1859 when local resident John Green donated his personal library to the city for public use. In 2004, the Worcester Library Foundation was established to raise funds and promote the library. In fiscal year 2009, the city of Worcester spent 1.14% ($4,817,006) of its budget on the library—some $26 per person.

== History ==
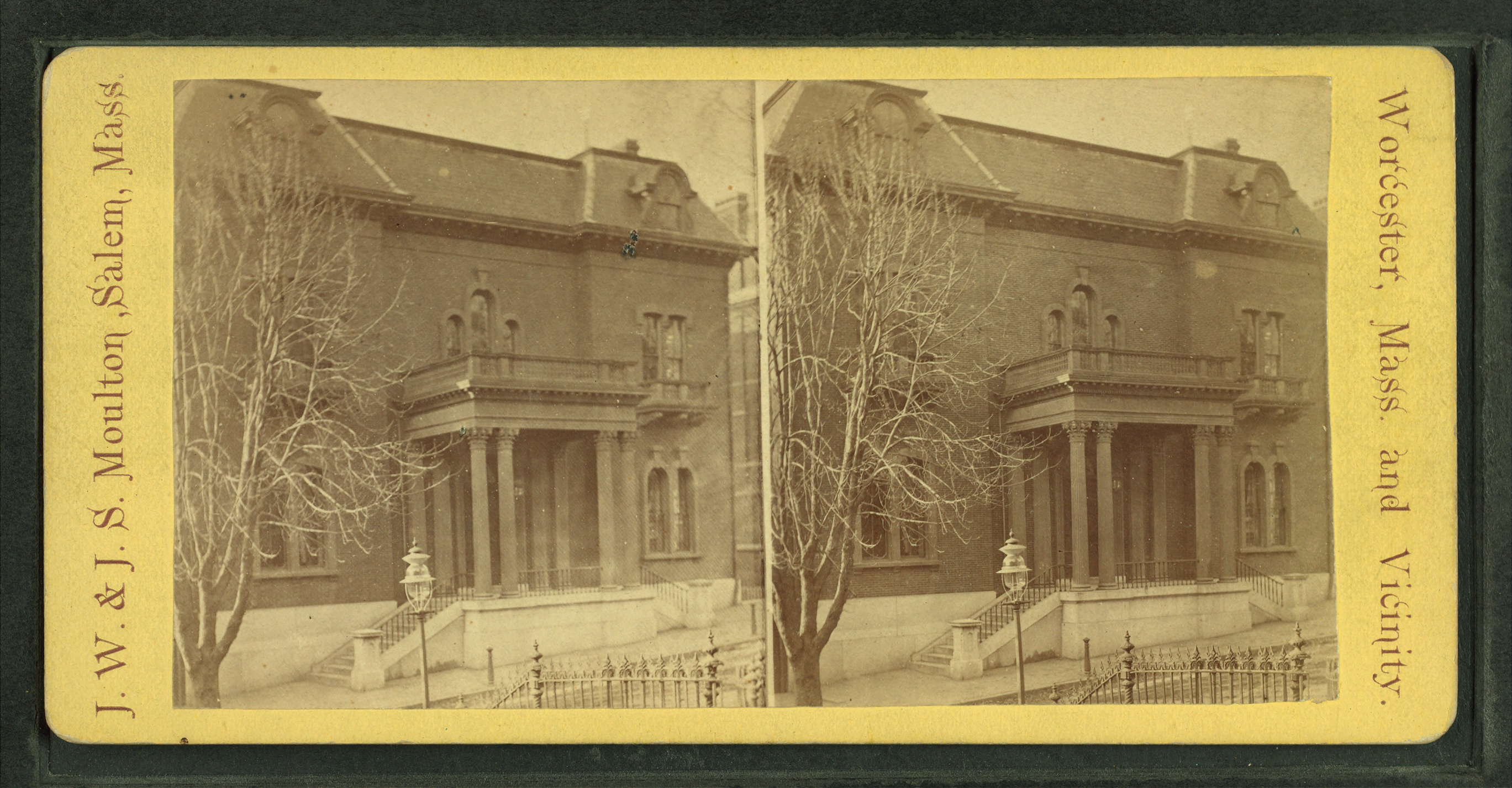
Worcester Public Library, 19th century

The Worcester Public Library originated in 1859, with a donation of 7,000 volumes from John Green III. Green was a Worcester-born "physician, dentist, surgeon, apothecary and man-midwife." In 1855, Green had donated 5,000 volumes from his personal collection to the Worcester Lyceum on a 5-year loan; as the loan was about to expire, Dr. Green decided to establish a free public library for the city. The original location of the library was the third floor of the Bank Block at Foster and Main Streets, but by 1861 an official library building had been constructed on Elm Street. The cornerstone of this library was laid on July 4, 1860. The construction of this library building satisfied Dr. Green's condition on his donation that "a suitable building should be provided for [the books], and that they should not be taken from the library room but freely read there at all times when the rooms are open." On December 8, 1872, the Free Public Library opened on Sundays, which was a momentous enough occasion to be recorded in The Worcester Book. By 1886, the total number of volumes in the library's collection was nearly 60,000.

In 1914, three new branches were introduced to the Worcester Public Library system. The branches, Greendale (later renamed Frances Perkins), Quinsigamond, and South Worcester, were all established with the help of grants from Andrew Carnegie. Throughout the 20th century, three other branches, including Billings Square, Tatnuck, and Main South were constructed, but all six of these libraries closed in 1990 (Frances Perkins reopened in 1992). The main branch of the library moved from Elm Street to its current location at Salem Square in 1964, and the current building was constructed in 2001.

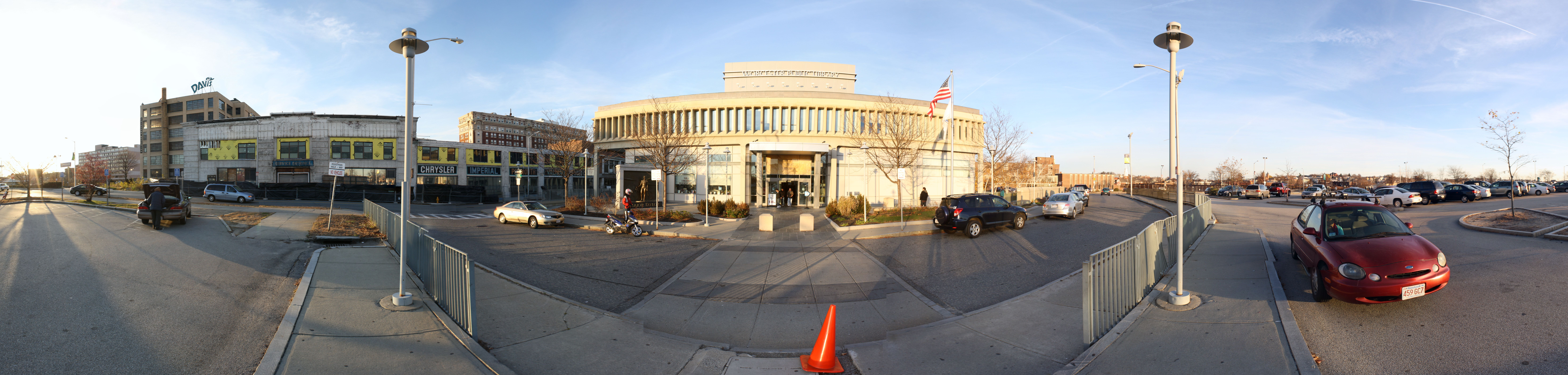
Panoramic view of the Main Branch of the Worcester Public Library in 2010.

== Bookmobile ==
The WPL has always been devoted to serving the Worcester community, and in 1940 the WPL's first Bookmobile was launched. The Bookmobile was intended to provide library services for areas of Worcester that could not reach one of the regular library branches, and the program was a huge success. In its first week, 2,500 of the 2,700 volumes carried by the Bookmobile were checked out. The Bookmobile eventually began circulating more volumes than any one branch of the WPL. In 1991, Bookmobile services were discontinued, but in 2012 the WPL launched the Mobile Library Branch, Library Express (Libby). Based on Libby's success, a second bookmobile named Lilly was launched in 2014, and in 2018 the Libby bookmobile was upgraded.

== Services ==
In addition to the regular circulation services, the WPL provides a number of other services. For New Americans and English Learners, the library provides print and audio resources for learning English, as well as information about applying for citizenship and even weekly classes to assist patrons in passing citizenship exams. The library also offers classes and one-on-one resume-writing workshops. The WPL also offers a Talking Book Library to its patrons with visual or other physical disabilities, who cannot read traditional print materials; the Talking Book Library provides resources in large type, braille, and described videos.

== Notable Staff ==
- Samuel Swett Green

== Branches ==
Current and Historical Branches of the Worcester Public Library
| Branch Name | Date Opened | Operational? (As of 2018) | Date Closed | Address | Additional information |
|---|---|---|---|---|---|
| Frances Perkins (Originally Greendale) | 1914 | Yes | 1990 (reopened 1992) | 470 West Boylston Street Worcester, MA 01606 | Carnegie Library |
| Quinsigamond | 1914 | No | 1990 | 14 Blackstone River Road Worcester, MA 01607 | Carnegie Library |
| South Worcester | 1914 | No | 1990 | 705 Southbridge Street Worcester, MA 01610 | Carnegie Library |
| Billings Square | 1928 | No | 1990 | | |
| Tatnuck | 1940 | No | 1990 | | |
| Main South | 1945 | No | 1990 | | |
| Main Branch | 2001 | Yes | NA | 3 Salem Square Worcester, MA 01608 | |
| Great Brook Valley | | Yes | NA | 89 Tacoma Street Worcester, MA 01605 | |
| Roosevelt | 2013 | Yes | NA | 1006 Grafton Street Worcester, MA 01604 | |
| Tatnuck Magnet | | Yes | NA | 1083 Pleasant Street Worcester, MA 01602 | |
| Goddard | | Yes | NA | 14 Richards Street Worcester, MA 01603 | |
| Burncoat | | Yes | NA | 526 Burncoat Street Worcester, MA 01606 | |
