= Congregation Beth Israel (Worcester, Massachusetts) =

Beth Israel
- Hebrew: בית ישראל
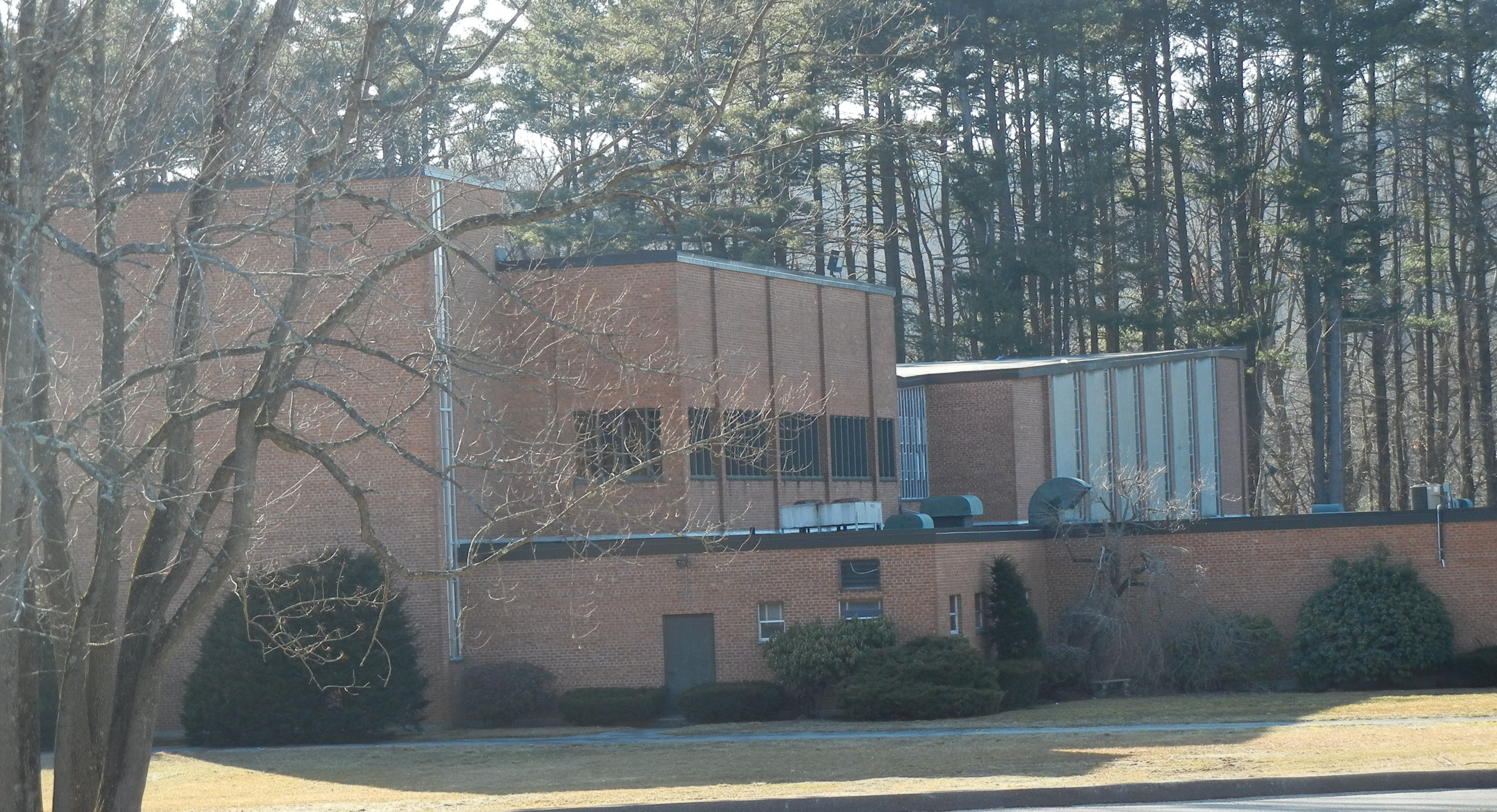
- Beth Israel synagogue building

- Location in Massachusetts

Religion
- Affiliation: Conservative Judaism
- Ecclesiastical or organisational status: Synagogue
- Leadership: Rabbi Aviva Fellman
- Status: Active

Location
- Location: 15 Jamesbury Drive, Worcester, Massachusetts
- Country: United States
- Administration: United Synagogue of Conservative Judaism
- Coordinates: 42°16′59″N 71°49′41″W

Architecture
- Established: 1924 (as a congregation)
- Groundbreaking: 1958
- Completed: 1941 (first synagogue); 1959 (current synagogue)
- Construction cost: $735,000 (today $8.1 million)
- Capacity: 476: Sanctuary; 110: Chapel; 950: Social hall

Website
- bethisraelworc.org

Congregation Beth Israel (Hebrew: בית ישראל) is an egalitarian Conservative synagogue and congregation located at 15 Jamesbury Drive in Worcester, Massachusetts, in the United States. Founded in 1924 as an Orthodox synagogue, the congregation formally affiliated with the United Synagogue of Conservative Judaism in 1949, and describes itself as the "leading Conservative congregation in Central Massachusetts."

The congregation first worshipped at a house on Pleasant Street; it constructed a synagogue building in its place in 1939. It completed its current location on Jamesbury Drive in 1959.

The congregation hired its first permanent rabbi, Israel Chodos, in 1940. Subsequent rabbis have included Emanuel Green (1942-1944), Sidney Guthman (1944-1948), Herbert Ribner (1948–1955), Abraham Kazis (1955–1973), Baruch Goldstein (1971–1986), and Jay Rosenbaum (1983–2003). In 1994, the synagogue and Rosenbaum were the subject of the book And They Shall be My People: An American Rabbi and His Congregation by Paul Wilkes.

Joel Pitkowsky succeeded Rosenbaum as rabbi in 2003. Pitkowsky left in 2011 and was succeeded by Rabbi Steven Schwarzman. Rabbi Schwarzman left in 2014 and was succeeded by Rabbi Aviva Fellman.

== Early history ==
Beth Israel was founded in 1924 as an Orthodox synagogue. The congregation initially worshiped at 835 Pleasant Street, in a house that had room for up to 75 worshipers. That same year it also founded a Sunday school.

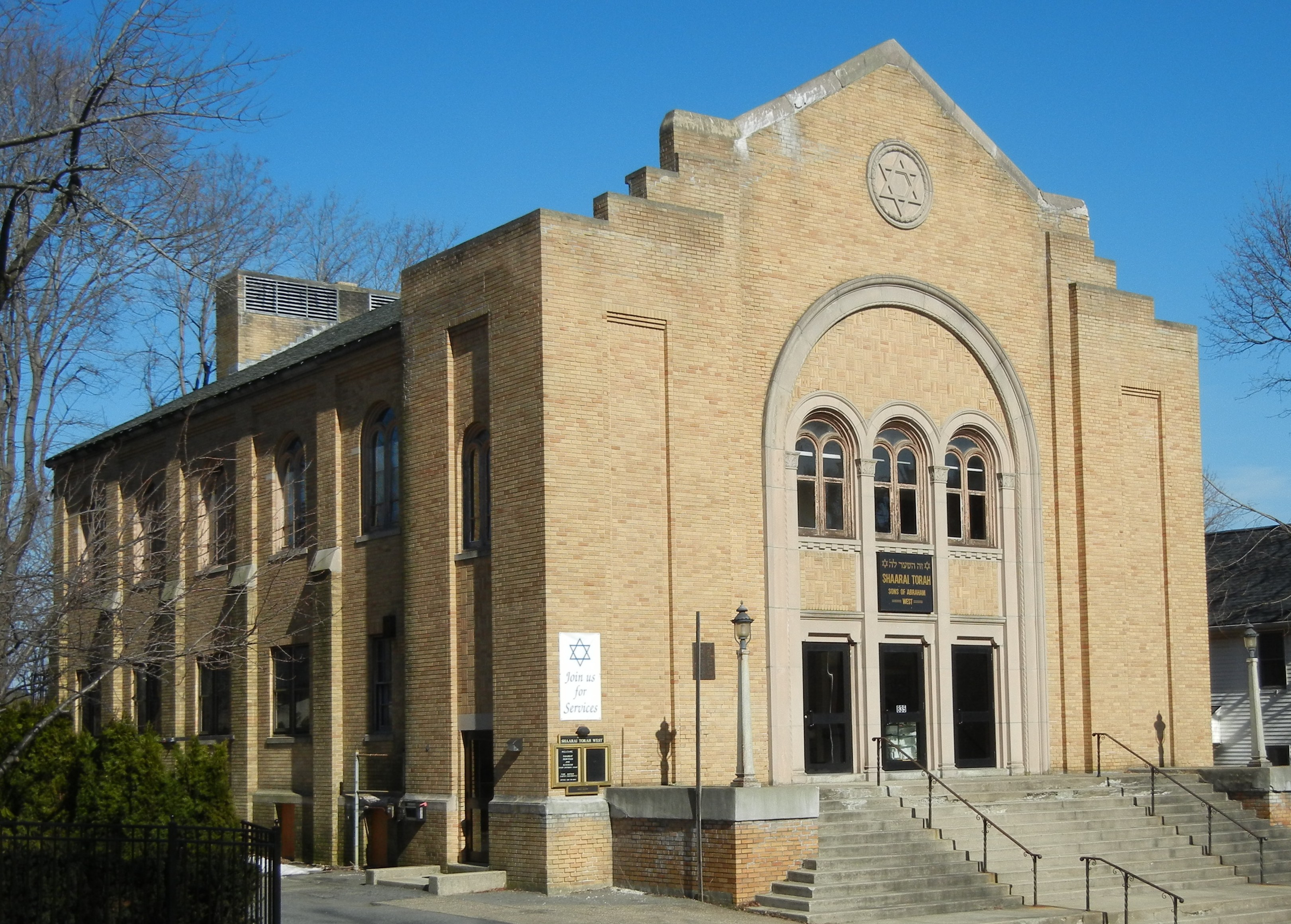
Pleasant Street building

Beth Israel hired its first permanent rabbi in 1940, and constructed its first building, on Pleasant Street (replacing the existing house) in July 1939, at a cost of $75,000 (today $1,740,000). The new building's sanctuary could accommodate 500 people. After World War II the congregation grew rapidly, from 242 member families in 1945, to 451 in 1953; by then the Hebrew school had 261 children in it. In 1945 the congregation voted to become Conservative, and in 1949 formally joined the United Synagogue of America (now United Synagogue of Conservative Judaism).

Herbert Ribner served as rabbi from 1948 to 1955, and was followed by Abraham Kazis in 1955. In 1957, Beth Israel was the second largest of Worcester's eleven Jewish congregations, with 532 member families; the largest, the Reform Temple Emanuel, had 1,340 member families (42 families were members of both).

== Jamesbury Drive building ==
In 1953, Beth Israel purchased 12.9 acres (5.2 ha) of land on Jamesbury Drive for $42,000 (today $470,000), and began construction of their current building on it in 1958. Completed in 1959, the building cost $735,000 (today $8.1 million), of which over $300,000 (today $3.3 million) was mortgaged. The building had a main sanctuary that sat 476, a chapel with seating for 110, and a social hall that could accommodate up to 950 people. For the High Holidays, the sanctuary could be expanded into the social hall, providing seating for 1,450. The mortgage was retired in 15 years. The structure at 835 Pleasant Street was sold on September 10, 1959 to the Orthodox Shaarai Torah Synagogue, to serve as its west side branch.

Kazis was succeeded as congregational rabbi by Baruch Goldstein in 1971. A native of Mława (then in East Prussia), Goldstein had been sent to Auschwitz concentration camp in 1942. His entire family perished in the Holocaust, but he survived and emigrated to the United States, where he became a rabbi.

Goldstein was succeeded by Jay Rosenbaum in 1986. A graduate of New York University and Rutgers University, he had been ordained by the Jewish Theological Seminary of America (JTSA) in 1980.

== 1990s to present ==
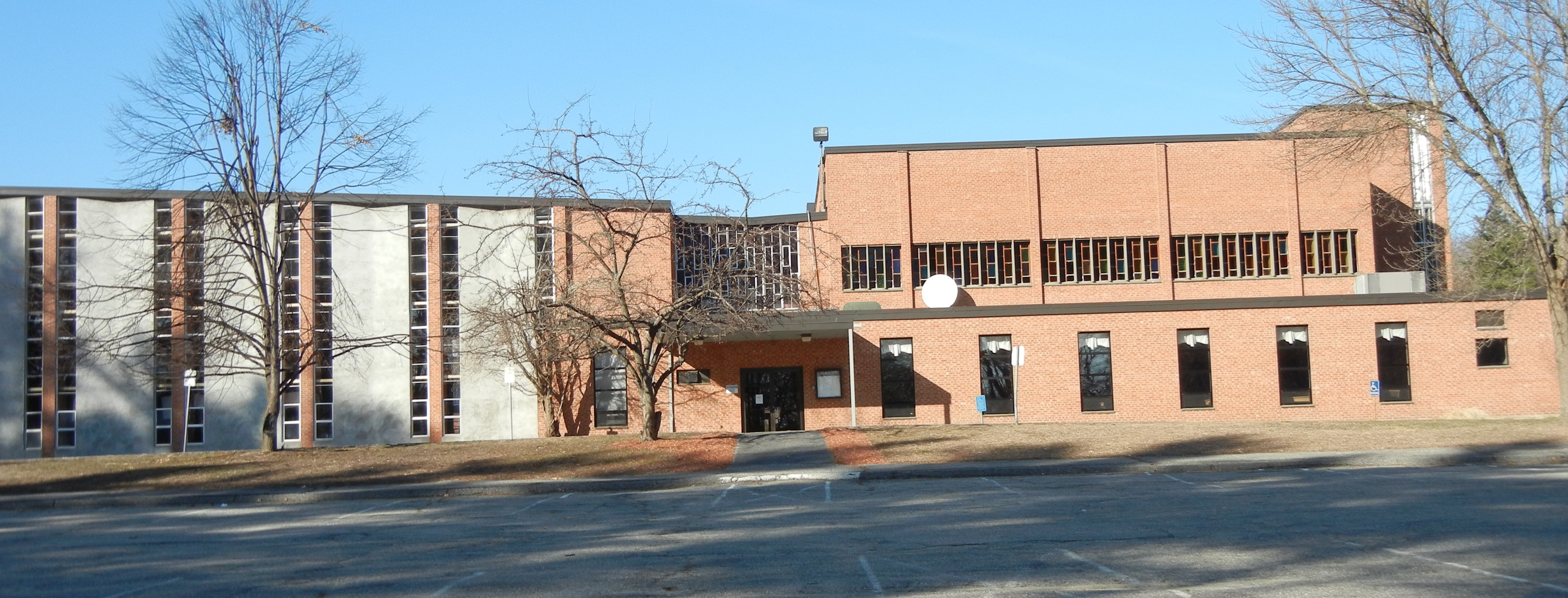
South-facing side of Jamesbury Drive building

In the early 1990s, the congregation still numbered around 530 member families. In 1994, the synagogue and Rosenbaum were the subject of the book And They Shall be My People: An American Rabbi and His Congregation, the observations of Paul Wilkes, who had spent two and a half years with Rosenbaum and the congregation.

During that period, the synagogue operated with annual budget deficit, which had risen to $210,000 (today $480,000). The board of directors raised annual dues from $650 (today $1,500) to $950 (today $2,200), but membership fell to 499 families, and Wilkes was concerned that Rosenbaum's job was threatened. By 1995, however, the deficit had been eliminated, and Rosenbaum was signed to a new three-year contract.

In the fall of 2001, Hazzan Devin Goldenberg was elected the Congregation's cantor, succeeding Hazzan Stephen Freedman. When Rabbi Rosenbaum left to lead Herzl-Ner Tamid Congregation in Mercer Island, Washington in the Spring of 2002, Hazzan Goldenberg continued to lead the Congregation alone until the Fall of 2003 when he was joined by Rabbi Joel Pitkowsky. Rabbi Pitkowsky, a graduate of Rutgers University and who received his ordination at the JTSA in 2001, had served as assistant rabbi of Conservative Synagogue Adath Israel of Riverdale before joining Beth Israel. Marina Shemesh joined as cantor in 2004. She was succeeded in 2010 by Elise Barber, a fifth year cantorial student at Hebrew College.

In 2014, Beth Israel hired its first female rabbi, Aviva Fellman.

== Leadership ==
=== Rabbinical ===
| Name | Years | Emeritus |
|---|---|---|
| Israel Chodos | 1940–1942 | |
| Emanuel Green | 1942–1944 | |
| Sidney Guthman | 1944–1948 | |
| Herbert Ribner | 1948–1955 | |
| Abraham Kazis | 1955–1973 | |
| Baruch Goldstein | 1971–1986 | 1986–2017 |
| Jay Rosenbaum | 1986–2002 | |
| Joel Pitkowsky | 2003–2011 | |
| Steven Schwarzman | 2011–2014 | |
| Aviva Fellman | 2014– | |

Baruch Goldstein served as Educator from 1952 to 1964 and Assistant Rabbi from 1971 to 1973. He served as the rabbi of Temple Emmanuel in Wakefield, Massachusetts from 1964-1971.

=== Cantorial ===
| Name | Years |
|---|---|
| Stanley Weinberger | 1982–1986 |
| Stephen Freedman | 1989–2001 |
| Devin Goldenberg | 2001–2004 |
| Marina Shemesh | 2004–2010 |
| Elise Barber | 2010–2012 |
| Annelise Ocanto | 2012–2015 |
| Jeri Robins | 2015–2017 |
