= List of Carnegie libraries in Massachusetts =

The following list of Carnegie libraries in Massachusetts provides information on Carnegie public libraries in Massachusetts, where 43 of them were built from 1901 to 1917, funded by 35 grants totaling $1,137,500 and awarded by the Carnegie Corporation of New York. Massachusetts Carnegie libraries were also built at five academic institutions at a cost of $513,846.

== Key ==
Building still operating as a library
Building standing, but now serving another purpose
Building no longer standing
Building listed on the National Register of Historic Places
Building contributes to a historic district on the National Register of Historic Places

== Public libraries ==
	Library	City or town	Image	Date granted	Grant amount	Location	Notes
1	Ashland	Ashland		Feb 20, 1903	$10,000	66 Front St.	
2	Athol	Athol		Mar 14, 1902	$22,000	568 Main St.	
3	Berkley	Berkley		Feb 6, 1915	$5,000	1 N. Main St.	
4	Brockton	Brockton		Apr 16, 1910	$110,000	304 Main St.	
5	Chelsea	Chelsea		Jul 20, 1908	$60,000	569 Broadway	
6	Clinton	Clinton		Mar 8, 1901	$25,000	54 Walnut St.	
7	Dighton	Dighton		Feb 15, 1905	$6,000	395 Main St.	
8	Edgartown	Edgartown		Apr 26, 1902	$4,000	58 N. Water St.	
9	Granby	Granby		Mar 31, 1916	$5,000	Library Ln.	
10	Holliston	Holliston		Jan 6, 1903	$10,000	752 Washington St.	
11	Hudson	Hudson		Jan 6, 1903	$12,500	3 Washington St.	
12	Lakeville	Lakeville		Jul 13, 1912	$5,000	241 Main St.	
13	Lee	Lee		Nov 25, 1903	$12,000	100 Main St.	
14	Leominster	Leominster		Dec 24, 1906	$27,500	30 West St.	Hartwell, Richardson & Driver, architects.
15	Lynn Haywood	Lynn		Mar 16, 1915	$50,000	270 Broadway	Now a subdivided commercial building.
16	Lynn Houghton	Lynn		Mar 16, 1915	—	833 Western Ave.	No longer a library.
17	Marlborough	Marlborough		Apr 26, 1902	$30,000	35 W. Main St.	Peabody & Stearns, architects.
18	Melrose	Melrose		Dec 30, 1901	$25,000	69 W. Emerson St.	
19	Millbury	Millbury		Mar 16, 1915	$12,500	128 Elm St.	
20	Needham	Needham		Jan 13, 1903	$10,000	968 Highland Ave.	Opened in 1904, replaced in 1914, old building demolished in the 1960s
21	New Marlborough	New Marlborough		Feb 3, 1917	$5,000		Burned down Jun 16, 1996
22	Reading	Reading		Jan 2, 1902	$15,000	16 Lowell St.	Now part of the town hall
23	Revere	Revere		Oct 3, 1901	$20,000	179 Beach St.	
24	Rockland	Rockland		Jan 13, 1903	$12,500	20 Belmont St.	
25	Rockport	Rockport		Jun 18, 1903	$10,000	18 Jewett St.	Now a private residence
26	Saugus	Saugus		Nov 9, 1916	$17,000		Demolished in the 1990s
27	Sharon	Sharon		Mar 14, 1913	$10,000	11 N. Main St.	Library relocated; building’s future undecided as of April 2026
28	Somerville Central	Somerville		Apr 8, 1907	$123,000	79 Highland Ave.	
29	Somerville East	Somerville		Apr 8, 1907	—	115 Broadway	
30	Somerville West	Somerville		Apr 8, 1907	—	40 College Ave.	
31	South Hadley	South Hadley		Dec 8, 1905	$10,000	27 Bardwell St.	No longer used as a library
32	Springfield Central	Springfield		Mar 30, 1905	$260,000	220 State St.	
33	Springfield Forest Park	Springfield		Mar 30, 1905	—	380 Belmont Ave.	
34	Springfield Indian Orchard	Springfield		Mar 30, 1905	—	44 Oak St.	
35	Springfield Memorial Square	Springfield		Mar 30, 1905	—	22 St. George Rd.	
36	Stoneham	Stoneham		Jan 13, 1903	$15,000	431 Main St.	
37	Taunton	Taunton		Apr 26, 1902	$70,000	12 Pleasant St.	
38	Turners Falls	Turners Falls		Mar 27, 1903	$13,500	201 Avenue A	
39	Walpole	Walpole		Jul 16, 1901	$15,000	65 Common St.	Library moved out in 2012; building sold.
40	West Springfield	West Springfield		Sep 20, 1915	$25,000	200 Park St.	
41	Worcester Frances Perkins	Worcester		Jul 1, 1910	$75,000	470 W. Boylston St.	Greendale Branch Library
42	Worcester Quinsigamond	Worcester		Jul 1, 1910	—	812 Millbury St.	
43	Worcester South Worcester	Worcester		Jul 1, 1910	—	705 Southbridge St.	

== Academic libraries ==
	Institution	Locality	Image	Year granted	Grant amount	Location	Notes
1	Mount Holyoke College	South Hadley		Dec 31, 1903	$50,000	Mount Holyoke College campus	Williston Memorial Library
2	Radcliffe College	Cambridge		Mar 31, 1905	$73,900	10 Garden Street/Radcliffe Yard	Schlesinger Library
3	Smith College	Northampton		Jul 13, 1905	$62,500	Smith College campus	Neilson Library
4	Tufts College	Medford		Dec 19, 1904	$100,000	Tufts University campus	Eaton Hall (no longer functions as a library)
5	Wellesley College	Wellesley		Mar 31, 1905; Jan 6, 1915	$132,000 $95,446	Wellesley College campus	Margaret Clapp Library

== See also ==
- Bibliography of Massachusetts
- Geography of Massachusetts
- History of Massachusetts
- Index of Massachusetts-related articles
- List of libraries in the United States
- List of public libraries in Massachusetts
- List of Massachusetts-related lists
- Outline of Massachusetts
