= Elwood Adams Store =

- U.S. National Register of Historic Places
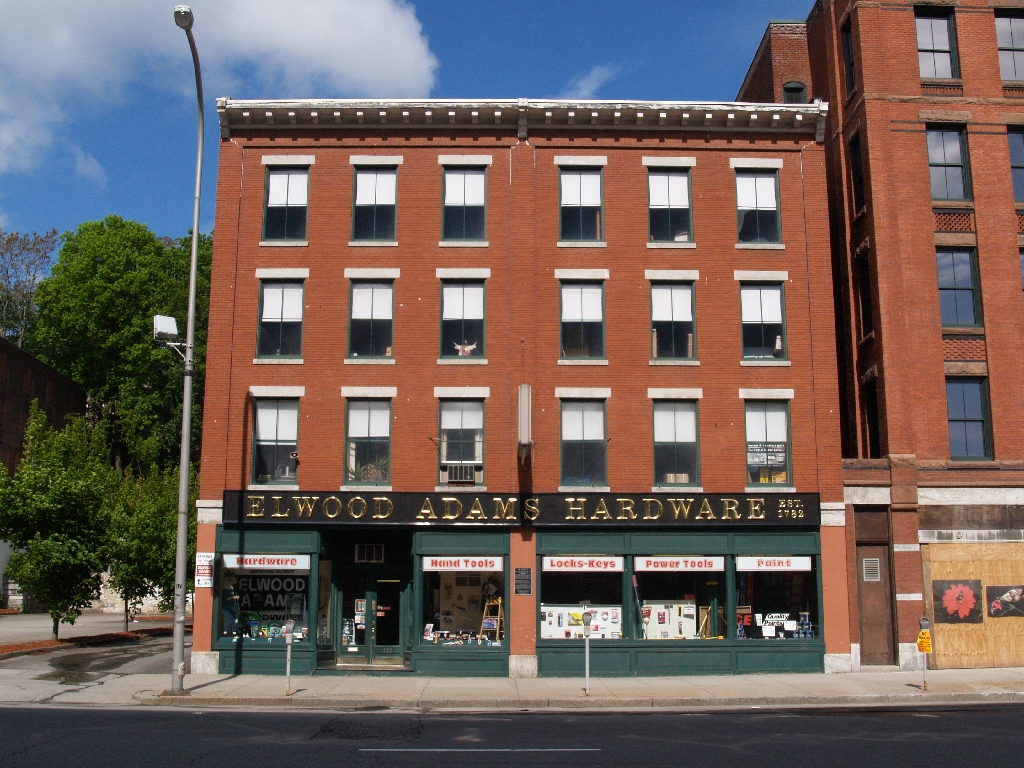

- Location within Massachusetts Location within the United States
- Location: 156 Main St., Worcester, Massachusetts
- Coordinates: 42°16′6.6″N 71°48′2.5″W
- Area: less than one acre
- Built: c. 1831
- Architectural style: Commercial Vernacular
- MPS: Worcester MRA
- NRHP reference No.: 80000584
- Added to NRHP: March 05, 1980

The Elwood Adams Store was an historic hardware store at 156 Main Street in Worcester, Massachusetts. At the time of its closing in October 2017, it had been one of the longest operating hardware stores in the United States, having begun business in 1782. The building, constructed about 1831 and enlarged around 1865, is the oldest commercial building in downtown Worcester. It was listed on the National Register of Historic Places in 1980.

== Description and history ==
The Elwood Adams Store building is located on the west side of Main Street in the northern part of Worcester's downtown area. The original structure, built about 1831, was raised from two-and-a-half to four stories about 1865, at which time the entire front was apparently refaced with new brick. The street facade originally consisted of two shopfronts of granite with iron posts at street level (since remodeled); the upper floors are divided into two groups of three rectangular windows with granite sills and lintels, separated by a central pier, and crowned by wooden cornice

The hardware store that became the Elwood Adams Store was established on this site in 1782 by Daniel Waldo Sr. It occupied the first brick building constructed in Worcester. Waldo's son Daniel Jr. took over the business in 1791, and later partnered with Henry Miller, who purchased it in partnership with George Rice in 1821. Miller took full ownership of the business in 1831, and purchased the building from Waldo's heirs in 1865. Miller sold the business to Elwood Adams and a partner in 1886. First known as Smith & Adams, it became known as the Elwood Adams Store in 1891, the name it retained until its closing in 2017.

== See also ==
- Armsby Block, next door
- National Register of Historic Places listings in northwestern Worcester, Massachusetts
- National Register of Historic Places listings in Worcester County, Massachusetts
