= Worcester Magazine =

- Categories: Alternative weekly
- Frequency: Weekly
- Circulation: 27,404 (March 2014)
- Founded: 1976
- Company: USA Today Co.
- Country: United States
- Based in: Worcester, Massachusetts
- Language: English
- Website: worcestermag.com
- ISSN: 0191-4960
- OCLC: 4936296

Worcester Magazine is a weekly magazine in Worcester, Massachusetts.

== History ==
Founded in 1976 by two recent graduates of Antioch College, Dan Kaplan and Ryck Lent, the magazine is distributed at more than 400 locations across Central Massachusetts. It is published weekly on Thursdays. Businessman Allen Fletcher is the former publisher of the magazine. In 2008, Holden Landmark Corporation purchased Worcester Magazine. In 2018, Holden Landmark Corporation was acquired by GateHouse Media, owner of the Telegram & Gazette.

In December 2023, the magazine announced it will cease free distribution. However, it will continue to be inserted on Fridays in the Telegram & Gazette and be published online to its website.
