= Worcester Area Sports Car Club =

Automobile club in Worcester, Massachusetts

Worcester Area Sports Car Club at start of a rally near Webster Square in Worcester, MA 1955

Worcester Area Sports Car Club, Inc. (WASCC) was an automobile club formed after World War II by owners of foreign-built sports cars supporting rallying and autocross held in and around Worcester, Massachusetts.

Worcester Area Sports Car Club first rallied together in 1954 with 15 members and incorporated as a nonprofit in the late 1950s. Early members included Cameron Dewar (motorsports writer for the Boston Herald) and Sante Graziani (dean of the School of the Worcester Art Museum). The WASCC was active through the 1980s.
