= Worcester, Massachusetts firsts =

Below is a list of events that occurred first in Worcester, Massachusetts.

== Worcester firsts ==
Worcester resident Harvey Ball's iconic smiley face

- 1776 – July 14, the Declaration of Independence was first publicly read in Massachusetts by Isaiah Thomas in Worcester.
- 1840 – The monkey wrench was invented by Loring Coes of the Coes Knife Company.
- 1847 – The first commercial valentine card was mass-produced in Worcester by Esther Howland.
- 1848 – Worcester blacksmith Albert Tolman is said to have invented the rickshaw for a missionary traveling to South America. (There are, however, numerous other theories about the origin of the rickshaw.)
- 1850 – October 23 and 24, the National Women's Rights Convention was first held in Worcester.
- 1855 – Worcester resident Joshua C. Stoddard invented the steam calliope.
- 1867 – Candy Cummings is reputed to have thrown the first ever curveball pitch in Worcester while playing for the Brooklyn Stars.
- 1880 – June 12, Lee Richmond of the Worcester Worcesters pitched the first perfect game in Major League Baseball history.
- 1892 – The founding meeting of the American Psychological Association was held at Clark University.
- 1895 – Worcester resident Henry Perky became the first to mass-produce shredded wheat.
- 1902 – Albert A. Michelson, chairman of Clark University's Physics Department, was named America's first Nobel Prize winner for his experiments relating to his calculation of the speed of light.
- 1914 – Dr. Robert H. Goddard of Worcester Polytechnic Institute's class of 1908 and later Clark University patented the first liquid fuel rocket.
- 1963 – Harvey Ball designed the world famous Smiley face.
- 2010 – The David Clark Company designed and built a pressure suit for Felix Baumgartner's world-record skydive attempt.
