= South Worcester Branch Library =

- U.S. National Register of Historic Places
- The former library building in 2026

- Location within Massachusetts Location within the United States
- Location: 705 Southbridge St., Worcester, Massachusetts
- Coordinates: 42°14′33″N 71°48′45″W
- Built: 1913
- Architect: Whitfield, Henry D.
- Architectural style: Classical Revival
- MPS: Worcester MRA
- NRHP reference No.: 80000486
- Added to NRHP: March 05, 1980

The South Worcester Branch Library is a historic former library building at 705 Southbridge Street in Worcester, Massachusetts. The single story Classical Revival building was built in 1913 by Henry D. Whitfield with funds donated by philanthropist Andrew Carnegie. The main facade consists of four windows, two on each side of a slightly projecting central entry pavilion. The building is set on a high basement, and granite stairs rise to the a doorway that is flanked by sidelights, then Doric pilasters, full height windows, and square cut columns with a center recessed section. The entry is topped by a decorative limestone panels. The walls are principally yellow brick, with limestone trim.

The building was listed on the National Register of Historic Places in 1980. It served as a branch of the Worcester Public Library until it was closed in 1990.

== See also ==
- List of Carnegie libraries in Massachusetts
- National Register of Historic Places listings in southwestern Worcester, Massachusetts
- National Register of Historic Places listings in Worcester County, Massachusetts
