= Shaarai Torah Synagogue (Worcester, Massachusetts) =

Former synagogue in Worcester, Massachusetts, United States

Shaarai Torah Synagogue (former)
- Hebrew: שַׁעֲרֵי תּוֹרָה, lit. 'Gates of Learning'
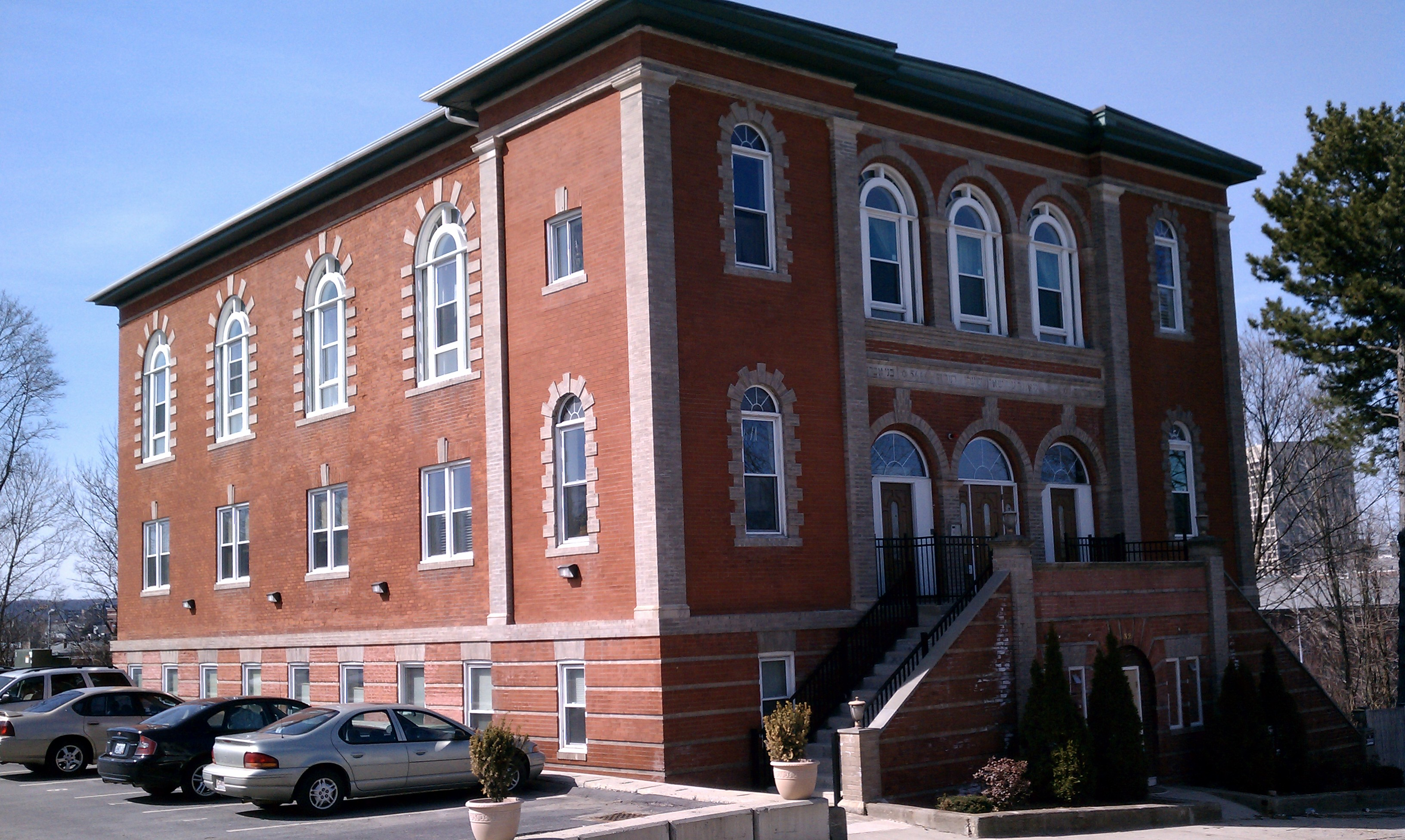
- Shaarai Torah Synagogue, in 2011

- Location in Massachusetts

Religion
- Affiliation: Modern Orthodox Judaism (former)
- Ecclesiastical or organisational status: Synagogue (former)
- Status: Closed (1999)

Location
- Location: 32 Providence Street, Worcester, Massachusetts
- Country: United States
- Coordinates: 42°15′21″N 71°47′38″W

Architecture
- Architect: Edwin T. Chapin
- Type: Synagogue
- Style: Classical Revival
- Established: 1904 (as a congregation)
- Completed: 1906
- Construction cost: $30,000
- Shaarai Torah Synagogue
- U.S. National Register of Historic Places
- MPS: Worcester MRA
- NRHP reference No.: 90000729
- Added to NRHP: May 7, 1990

Shaarai Torah Synagogue (Hebrew: שַׁעֲרֵי תּוֹרָה, lit. 'Gates of Learning') is an historic former Modern Orthodox Jewish synagogue building located at 32 Providence Street, Worcester, Massachusetts, in the United States. Worcester's first Modern Orthodox "shul" (and 6th overall), Shaarai Torah was considered the city's "Mother Synagogue" for many years.

== History ==
The congregation, which was incorporated on January 1, 1904, held daily worship services for two years in a cottage they had purchased at 32 Providence Street in the heart of Worcester's east side Union Hill neighborhood, where most Jewish immigrants to Worcester lived. High Holiday services in 1904 and 1905 were held at Ancient Order of Hibernians (A.O.H.) Hall at 26 Trumbull Street while the present structure was built. At a final cost of $30,000 ($1,075,000 in current dollar terms), the new building, designed by Edwin T. Chapin in a Classical Revival style, and modeled after Congregation Kehilath Jeshurun in New York City, opened on September 14, 1906.

=== Merger ===
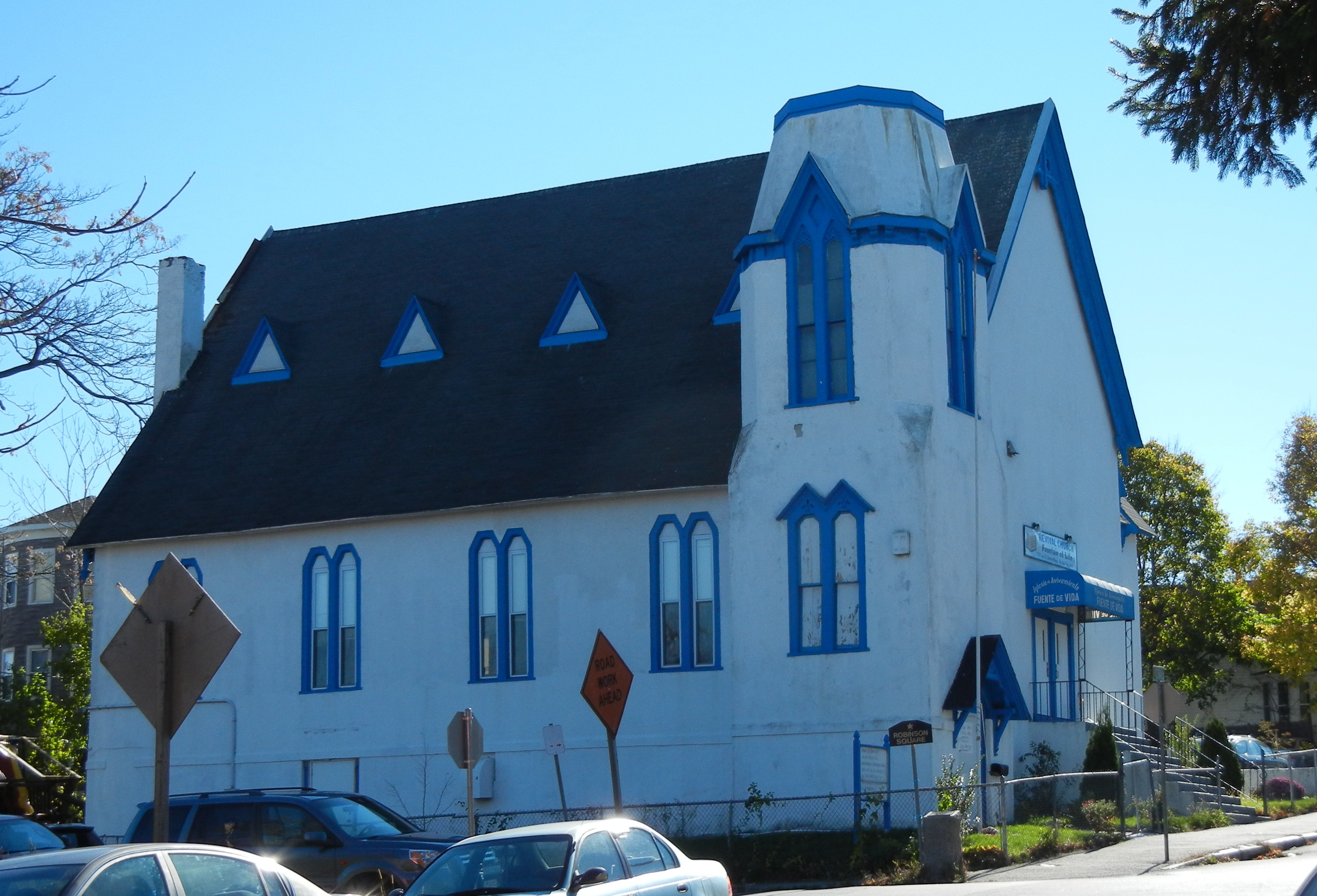
Former Sons of Abraham Synagogue at 23 Coral Street

Most of the charter members of Shaarai Torah had left Congregation Sons of Abraham, Worcester's second-oldest synagogue, because they felt it did not meet the needs of the younger generation. One of the major issues was the use of English in the synagogue. As early as 1907, Sons of Abraham leaders discussed implementing changes to make merging with Shaarai Torah possible. The merger finally took place in 1948. From then on, the synagogue was officially known as Congregation Shaarai Torah Sons of Abraham.

=== West Side branch ===
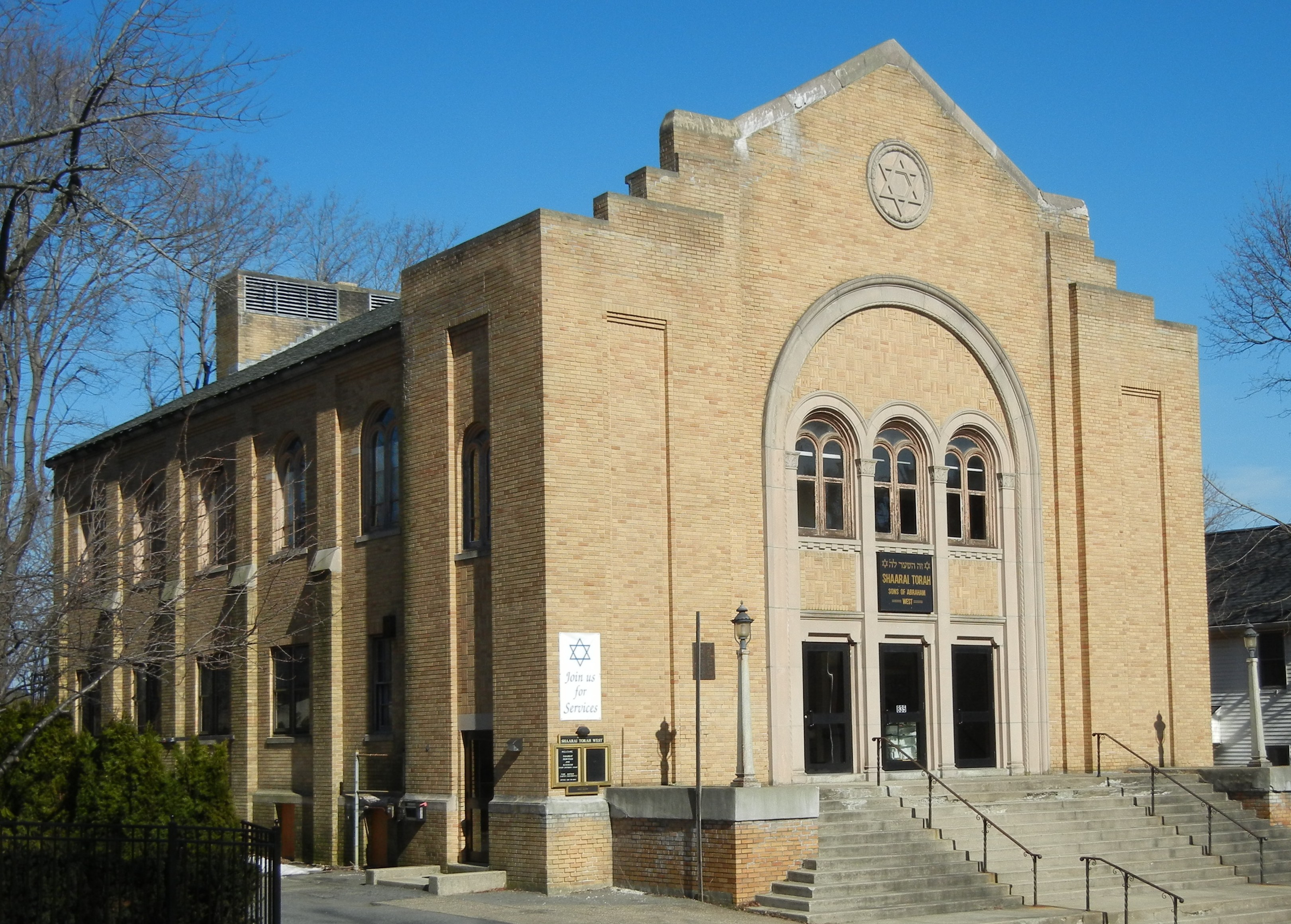
Shaarai Torah West

By 1957, roughly 74% of Worcester's 9,333 Jews lived on the tonier west side of the city, leaving less than 1,600 living on the east side. Additionally, most west side Jews, who were generally younger and more assimilated than those who remained on the east side, attended Reform Temple Emanuel or Conservative Congregation Beth Israel as Orthodoxy fell out of favor with most upwardly mobile American Jews. On September 10, 1959, Shaarai Torah purchased the former home of Beth Israel at 835 Pleasant Street as a west side branch, naming it Shaarai Torah West. The original building became known as Shaarai Torah East. Shaarai Torah West, affiliated with the Orthodox Union, became an independent congregation on November 9, 1964 and continues to operate to this day.

=== Final days ===
The Providence Street building was added to the National Register of Historic Places in 1990. The synagogue stopped functioning in 1996 and finally closed shortly after a devastating arson fire in 1999. Once one of at least 12 neighborhood Orthodox synagogues, when it closed Shaarai Torah was the last remaining functioning synagogue on the east side of Worcester. The building was sold in 1997 to Al Tapper, a Worcester native and philanthropist who had plans to turn it into a Jewish museum or multi-ethnic community center, but those plans were scrapped after the fire. Tapper was able to get the developer to agree to keep the Hebrew inscriptions on the facade of the building intact.

=== Redevelopment ===
Abandoned and in disrepair, the synagogue was added to the Worcester Preservation Society's list of endangered properties. In 2003, the building was finally sold to Selim LaHoud, a property developer, who hired Kopec Contracting to convert it into 11 apartments known as Red Oak Condominiums.

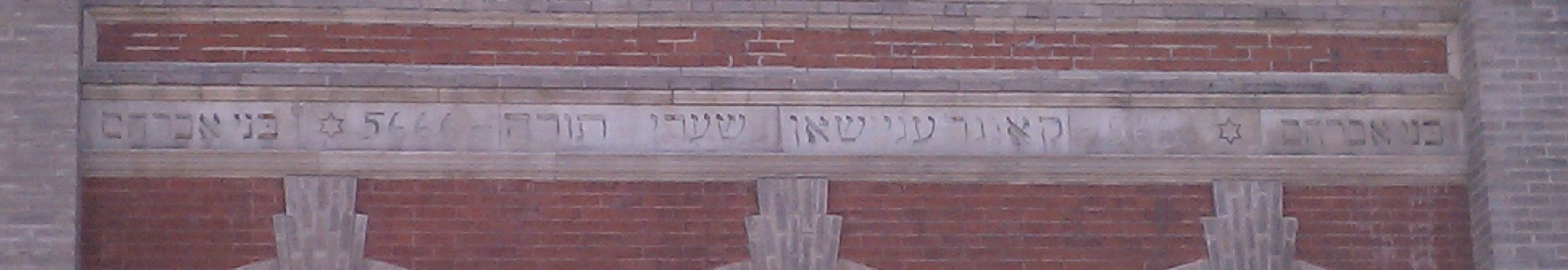
Close up of Hebrew inscription over front entrance

== Rabbinical leadership ==
Ordinal	Name	Years	Notes
1	Isaac Werne (orig. Wiernikowski)	1906–1911	
2	Solomon Golubowski		
3	Gershon Appel	1943–1947	
4	Meyer Greenberg	1947–1954	
5	Joseph Gold	1954–1989	

== East Side Synagogue history ==
Hebrew Name	Transliteration	English Translation	Address(es)	Years Open	Notes
בני ישראל	B'nai Yisrael	Sons of Israel	79 Green Street, 24 Providence Street	1875-1957	also known as the Balbirishocker Shul, Torn down for construction of I-290 in 1957
בני אברהם	B'nai Avraham	Sons of Abraham	10 Plymouth Street (1888-1913), 23 Coral Street	1886-1948	Merged with Shaarai Torah in 1948
שערי צדק	Shaarei Tzedek	Gates of Righteousness	8 Beach Street, 16 Gold Street, 3 Summit Street	1892-?	also known as Tower of Truth
אגודת אחים	Agudas Achim	Union of Brothers	19 Brown Street, 9 Pond Street	1897-?	also known as Good Brothers
(צמח צדק (אנשי סמוליאן	Tzemach Tzedek (Anshe Smolian)	Plant of Justice (People of Smolyan)	10 Plymouth Street	1900-1923	Changed name to Sons of Jacob in 1923
שערי תורה	Shaarai Torah	Gates of Learning	32 Providence Street	1904-1999	
(אגודת ישראל (אנשי ספרד	Agudas Israel (Anshe Safard)	Union of Israel (Sephardic)	66 Harrison Street	1913-1972	Demolished 3/24/72
בני יעקב	B'nai Yaakov	Sons of Jacob	104 Harrison Street	1923-1965	Merged with Tifereth Israel (West Side) in 1965
תפארת ישראל	Tifereth Israel	Pride of Israel	42 Harrison Street	19??-1957	Torn down for construction of I-290 in 1957
בני ציון	B'nai Tzion	Sons of Zion	50 Granite Street	1938-1986	
קדימה	Kadimah	Forward			
אנשי ראקישוק	Anshe Rakishok	People of Rokiškis			

== Notable alumni and members ==
- S. N. Behrman, playwright and screenwriter
- Charles Tobias, lyricist and inductee of the Songwriters Hall of Fame
- Harry Tobias, songwriter and inductee of the Songwriters Hall of Fame

== See also ==
- Temple Emanuel Sinai (Worcester, Massachusetts)
- Congregation Beth Israel (Worcester, Massachusetts)
- National Register of Historic Places listings in eastern Worcester, Massachusetts
