= Quinsigamond Branch Library =

- U.S. National Register of Historic Places
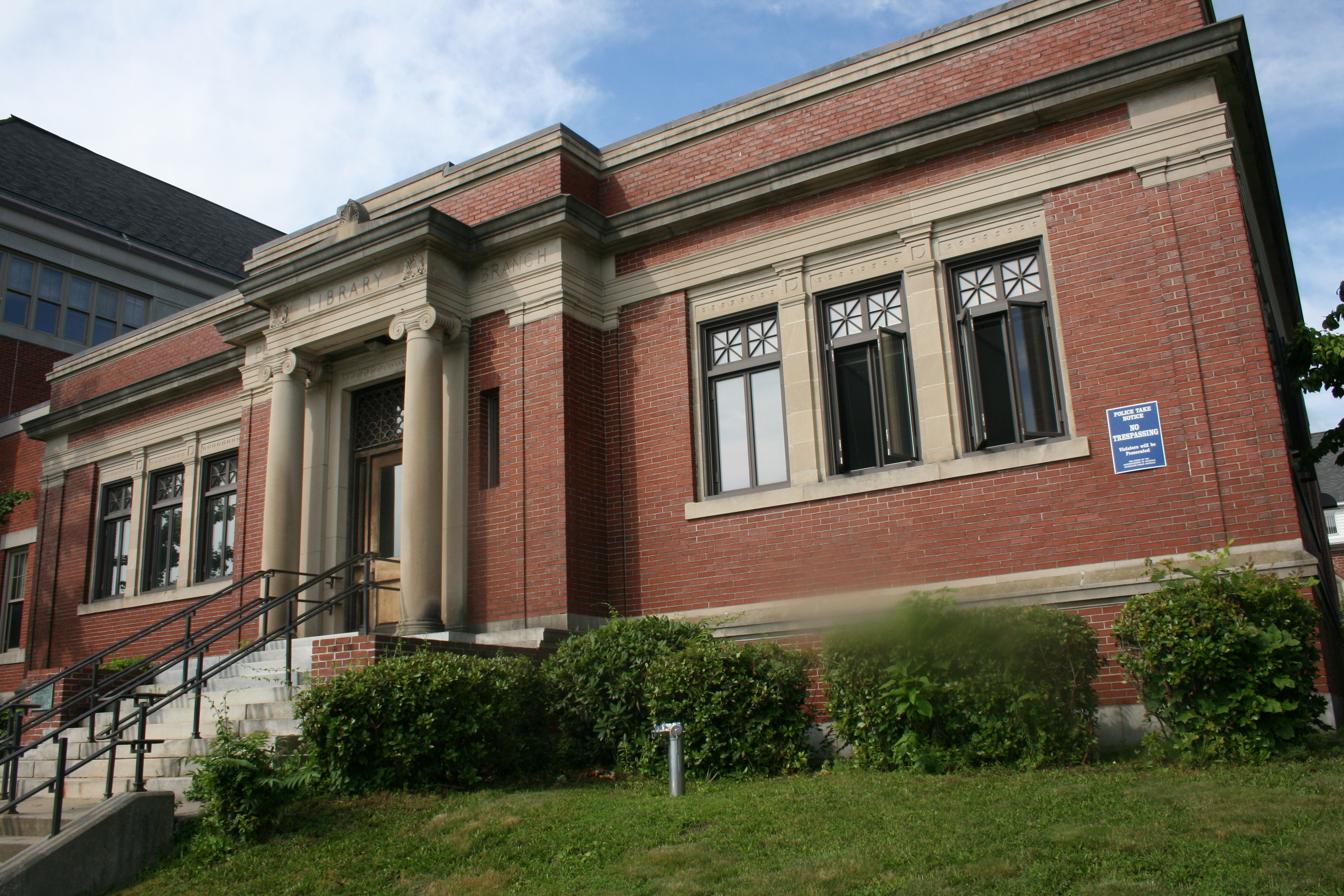

- Location within Massachusetts Location within the United States
- Location: 14 Blackstone River Rd., Worcester, Massachusetts
- Coordinates: 42°13′55″N 71°52′53″W
- Built: 1913
- Architect: Fuller & Delano Company
- Architectural style: Beaux Arts
- MPS: Worcester MRA
- NRHP reference No.: 80000494
- Added to NRHP: March 05, 1980

The Quinsigamond Branch Library, now part of the Quinsigamond Elementary School. is an historic school building and former library at 14 Blackstone River Road in Worcester, Massachusetts. The building was originally built as a Carnegie Library in 1913 with funds donated by Andrew Carnegie, who was present to lay the cornerstone that year. It as since been converted into part of the Quinsigamond Elementary School. The building was added to the National Register of Historic Places in 1980.

== Description and history ==
The former Quinsigamond Branch Library building stands at the southwest corner of Blackstone River Road and Stebbins Street. It is a single story masonry structure, built out of red brick with limestone trim. Its main facade faces east, and is symmetrically arranged, with a central projecting entry pavilion flanked by groups of three windows. The entry is sheltered by a shallow porch that projects from the pavilion, supported by round Ionic columns. The flanking window groups consist of casement windows with decorative transoms above. The roof is flat, but is obscured by a parapet with limestone coping. The building is now joined to the adjacent elementary school building.

The library was one of three built in the city that were funded in part by a grant from Andrew Carnegie. Before its branch libraries were built, residents in outer neighborhoods had to either travel to the central library on Elm Street, or use neighborhood pickup points. The land on which it stands was donated by the American Steel and Wire Company. The architects were the Fuller & Delano Company of Worcester. The library was closed (along with all the other branches) in 1990. It was thereafter joined to the school, and now houses its cafeteria.

== See also ==
- List of Carnegie libraries in Massachusetts
- National Register of Historic Places listings in eastern Worcester, Massachusetts
