= Paul Wilkes =

American writer

Paul Wilkes is a journalist, writer, documentarian, and social entrepreneur who has written extensively about the human condition, individual spirituality, as well as the role of religion in public and personal lives. As a social entrepreneur he has worked to aid the poor and marginalized both in America and in India

“Trying Out the Dream: A Year in the Life of an American Family,” one of Wilkes’s early books, published in 1974, chronicled a prototypical average family. It was the basis for Wilkes’ television series, “Six American Families,” which won a DuPont Columbia award in 1976 for documentary excellence. The book and series were among the first to tell a larger story of the interplay in human lives by intensely focusing on one subject family.

A practicing Catholic for much of his life, Wilkes wrote about epochal changes in the lives of Catholics and the Catholic Church following the Second Vatican Council, 1962-1965. His book, “In Mysterious Ways: The Death and Life of a Parish Priest,” which began as a New Yorker profile, won a Christopher Award in 1990.

Sensing a disconnect between rigid Church teachings -- which stressed uniformity and obedience to clerical dictates -- and a newly enfranchised Catholic laity, he created the New Beginnings series, which thousands of parishes and churches employed to bring congregants into a more socially involved and spiritual life.

His work as a social entrepreneur began when working on a story about delinquent youth for the Boulder (CO) Daily Camera in 1966. He wrote “they needed attention, not detention.” Attention Homes observed its 50th Anniversary in 2016.

After he was inspired by the Catholic Worker and met its founder, Dorothy Day, he saw the needs of the poor and underserved close at hand, as they lived just a few blocks away from him in otherwise fashionable Park Slope in Brooklyn. In 1971 he gave up all of his material possessions and co-founded a social service center named CHIPS, Christian Help in Park Slope, which continues to this day, serving food to the poor and providing a home and support for homeless mothers.

Later in life, in 2006, after coming upon an abandoned child in India who was cruelly blinded, he founded Homes of Hope India, which has raised millions to build 35 homes for orphaned, abandoned and sex-trafficked girls in India.

[|Paul Wilkes]] was born September 12, 1938 to Paul and Margaret (Salansky) Wilkes in Cleveland, Ohio, the last of seven children. His father, a coal miner and carpenter, and mother, who worked as a domestic, both of Slovak heritage, were educated only to the sixth grade. When his grandparents emigrated from Slovakia, the family name was Vlk, but gradually mutated into Wilkes, perhaps because his father worked in coal mines near Wilkes Barre, Pennsylvania.

In order to pay for college, Wilkes worked full time in various factory and trucking jobs during his undergraduate days at Marquette University, barely earning a sufficient grade point average to earn his BA in Journalism. He then entered the U.S. Navy as a communications and operations officer, serving from 1961 to 1964 on board USS POWER (DD-839). He traveled throughout the Mediterranean, Middle East and as far east as Sri Lanka. He participated in the blockade during the Cuban Missile Crisis and was the Officer of the Deck when POWER turned back a freighter carrying contraband Russian missile parts to Cuba.

After his military service, he was a reporter for two years for the Boulder Daily Camera. He then graduated from the Columbia University Graduate School of Journalism in 1967, and worked at the Baltimore Sun for two years before becoming a free-lance writer.

In addition to the New Yorker, The New York Times Magazine and The Atlantic, he has written for numerous other publications. He has written over twenty books. He was a visiting writer at many universities, including Columbia, Clark, Holy Cross, Boston University, Notre Dame, the University of Pittsburgh and the University of North Carolina at Wilmington.

He has been honored for his body of work with a Distinguished Alumni Award from Columbia, the Byline Award from Marquette, and Man of the Year from his high school, Cathedral Latin in Cleveland. He received a Lifetime Achievement Award from the Wilmington (NC) Star News.

He is married (1982) to Tracy (Gochberg) Wilkes MSW. They have two sons, Paul Noah Wilkes (1984) and Daniel Thomas Wilkes (1986).

== Books ==
- Fitzgo: The Wild Dog of Central Park, nonfiction (Philadelphia: Lippincott, 1973)
- These Priests Stay, biography (New York: Simon & Schuster, 1973)
- You Don't Have to Be Rich to Own a Brownstone, nonfiction (New York: Quadrangle, 1973)
- Trying Out the Dream: A Year in the Life of an American Family, nonfiction (Philadelphia: Lippincott, 1975)
- Six American Families, biography (New York: United Church of Christ, 1977)
- Merton: By Those Who Knew Him Best, biography (San Francisco: Harper, 1984)
- In Mysterious Ways: The Death and Life of a Parish Priest, biography (New York: Random House, 1990)
- Companions along the Way, essays (Chicago: Thomas More Press, 1990)
- My Book of Bedtime Prayers, children's (Minneapolis: Augsburg, 1992)
- The Education of an Archbishop: Travels with Rembert Weakland, biography (Maryknoll: Orbis, 1992)
- Temptations, novel (New York: Random House, 1993)
- And They Shall Be My People: An American Rabbi and His Congregation, nonfiction (New York: Atlantic Monthly, 1994)
- The Good Enough Catholic: A Guide for the Perplexed, nonfiction (New York: Ballantine, 1996)
- The Seven Secrets of Successful Catholics, nonfiction (New York: Paulist Press, 1998)
- Beyond the Walls: Monastic Wisdom for Everyday Life, nonfiction (New York: Doubleday, 1999)
- Excellent Catholic Parishes: The Guide to the Best Places and Practices, nonfiction (New York: Paulist Press, 2001)
- Excellent Protestant Congregations: The Guide to the Best Places and Practices, nonfiction (Louisville: Westminster John Knox Press, 2001)
- Best Practices from America's Best Churches, editor, nonfiction (New York: Paulist Press, 2003)
- In Due Season: A Catholic Life, memoir (San Francisco: Jossey-Bass, 2009)
- Your Second to Last Chapter: Creating a Meaningful Life on Your Own Terms, nonfiction (Chicago: ACTA, 2015)

== Films ==
- Six American Families, documentary, Public Broadcasting Service (PBS), 1977
- Men of Iron, drama, Public Broadcasting Service (PBS), 1978
- The Molders of Troy, co-writer, drama, Public Broadcasting Service (PBS), 1980
- Merton, documentary, Public Broadcasting Service (PBS), 1984
