= Milton Prince Higgins =

American industrialist and educator (1842–1912)

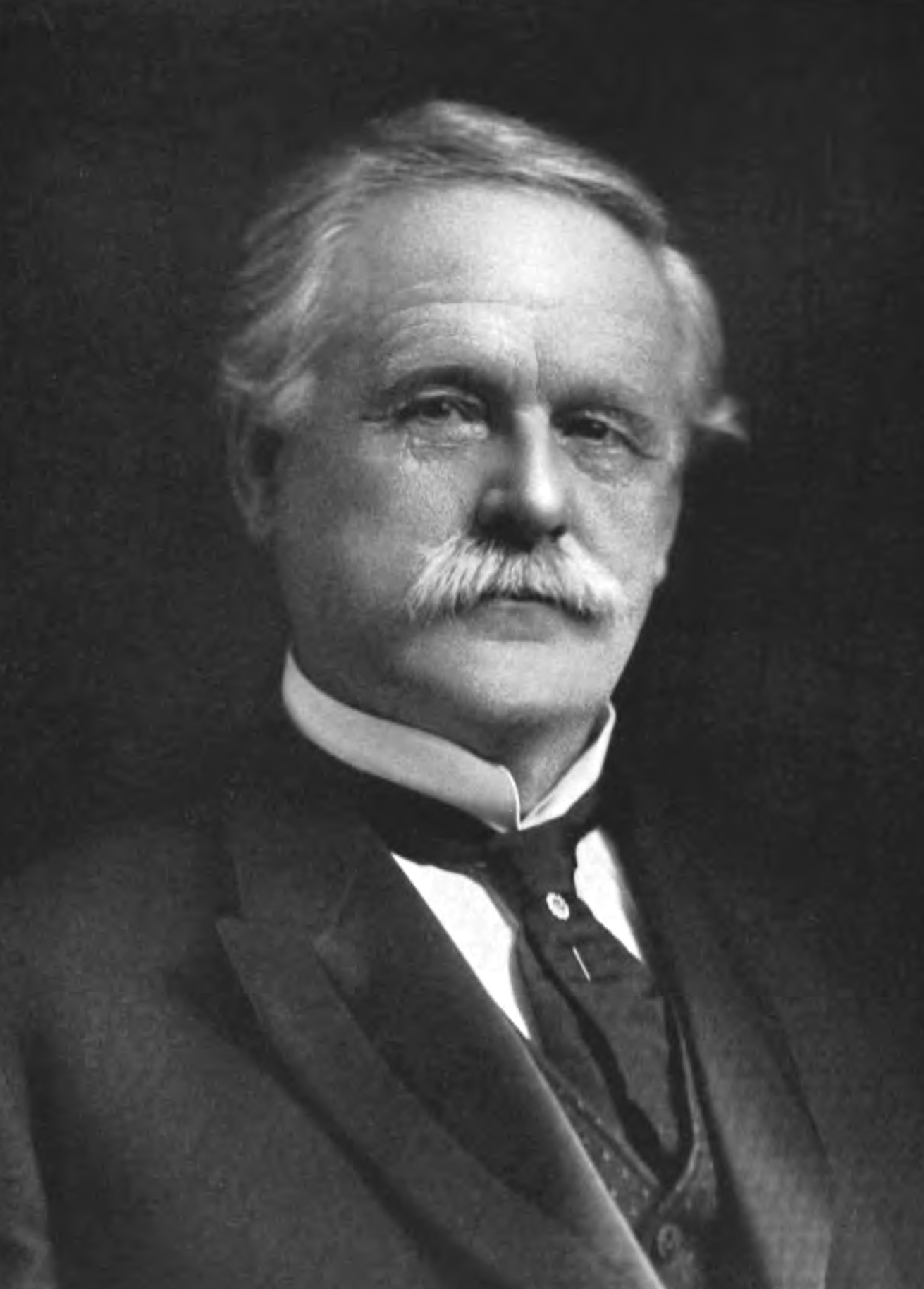
- Born: December 7, 1842; Standish, Maine, United States
- Died: March 7, 1912 (aged 69); Worcester, Massachusetts, United States
- Education: Dartmouth College (BS)
- Spouse: Katherine Elizabeth Chapin (m. 1870)
- Children: 4, including Aldus, John, and Olive
- Relatives: Robert Sanford Riley (son-in-law)

Milton Prince Higgins (December 7, 1842 – March 7, 1912) was an American educator and industrialist who served as the first president of Norton Abrasives.

== Early life and education ==
Higgins was born on December 7, 1842, in Standish, Maine, to farmer Lewis Higgins and Susan Whitney. He was the ninth child out of ten siblings. His paternal ancestor, Richard Higgins, came to America in 1632 and was one of the founders of Eastham, Massachusetts.

Higgins attended the public schools of Standish. He also completed his high school education in Gorham Academy at the neighbouring town of Gorham. He went to Manchester, New Hampshire and, after a three-year apprenticeship within the shops at the Amoskeag Manufacturing Company, entered Dartmouth College where he graduated with a Bachelor of Science in 1868.

== Career ==
After graduating from the College, one of the co-founders of the Worcester Polytechnic Institute, Ichabod Washburn, planned to appoint Higgins as the first superintendent of the Washburn Shops. As the institution hadn't opened its doors publicly yet, Washburn drew Higgins into Worcester, Massachusetts, where Higgins first worked as a drafter and mechanical engineer at the Washburn and Moen North Works District under Charles Hill Morgan during the intervening months.

At the opening of the institution, Higgins was officially appointed as the first superintendent of the Shops on December 1868. During his time as superintendent, he demonstrated the worth of commercial shops in technical education, where it made students learn pratical experiences in machine shops and made the shops a source of profit within WPI.

By 1880, the Washburn Shops received recognition due to its commercial aspects. Following this, Higgins would then devote his time as a consultant on the organization of the shops connected to the Georgia School of Technology and the Miller Manual Labor School. The governor of Massachusetts appointed Higgins as Massachusetts State Commissioner of Industrial Education to act with the state commission.

He held the role of superintendent of the Institute until 1896. Higgins' aggressive management within the shops came under flak from the trustees of the Institute who were critical of the commercial shop plan. According to Washburn's original agreement, the superintendent can be appointed and removed by the board of trustees of the institution, but Higgins was given freedom from contract making and supervision of the business. In 1895, with the appointment of Thomas Corwin Mendenhall as the new president of WPI, the board of trustees voted that the president's authority extends on all department.

In 1896, they voted for the disposing of the contracts, tools, and materials of the elevator business in the Washburn Shops. In response to this, Higgins, together with his friend George I. Alden, Professor of Mechanical Engineering of the Institute, purchased the elevator business he has built up and resigned from WPI. After his resignation, he was made a trustee of the institution in 1903 because of his contributions in the development of the institution.

Higgins founded the Plunger Elevator Company in 1896 at Worcester, where he appointed himself as president and Alden as treasurer. John Woodman Higgins, his son, was plant engineer and secretary of the Company. Higgins' company soon caught attention of the Otis Elevator Company, when the company installed sixteen high-speed elevators in a New York hotel in 1900, where they bought it in 1904.

In 1899, at a meeting of the American Society of Mechanical Engineers in New York, he held a speech on "The Education of Machinists, Foremen and Mechanical Engineers." It is said that when an opportunity comes, Higgins would speak on this topic and other related subjects. From 1901 to 1903, Higgins served as vice-president of the Society.

=== Norton Abrasives ===
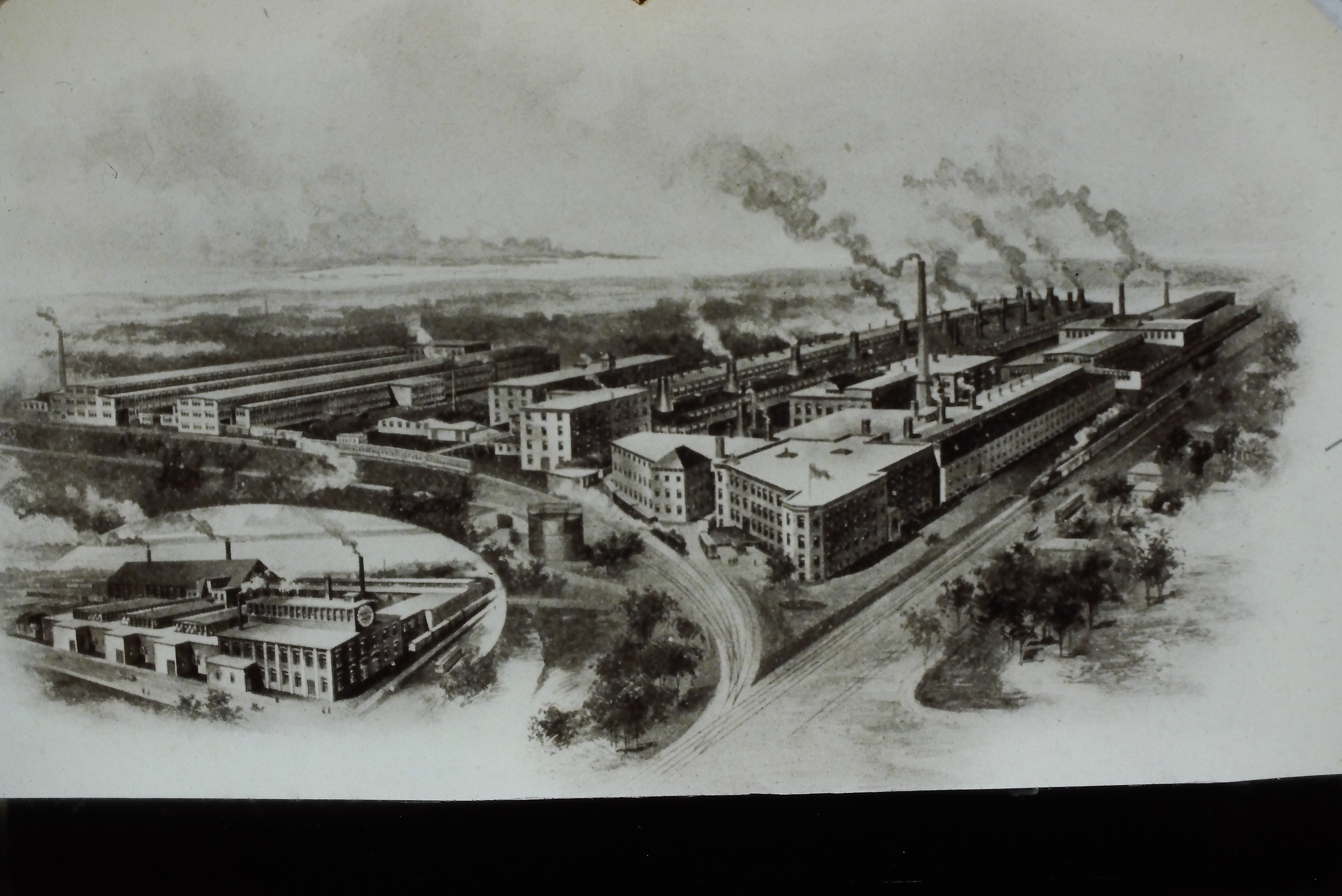
Norton Company in 1909

Ten years earlier, Sven Pulson, an employee of Frank B. Norton's pottery, discovered that he could make a grinding wheel while attempting to make a clay binder for the emery grain and quartz crystals and heating it up in a kiln. By 1879, Norton's stoneware became a commercial success that Pulson's brother-in-law, John Jeppson, helped with the shop, spending his time molding the emery wheels. As the business grew, Walter L. Messer came to promote sales and Charles L. Allen helped with the bookkeeping of the administration. Before long, the grinding wheels found their way into the Washburn Shops in WPI, where Higgins sought interest with them. As the company became short on cash by 1884, Norton put the price on the business at $10,000.

Wanting to raise cash to pay for the business, Messer asked Higgins to pay for the remaining funds to purchase, where he agreed. Afterwards, Higgins purchased the business which had started as a sideline of the pottery, and organized it into the Norton Emery Wheel Company by May 1885. Higgins appointed himself president with Alden as treasurer of the company. Jeppson and Allen was also rehired into the company as superintendent and secretary, respectively. For the first year of the company, the Wheel Company continued its operations in the Norton Pottery on Water Street, Worcester. The next year, a plant was built on Barber's Crossing, in which Higgins purchased the land. In 1896, they purchased the Grant Corundum Wheel Manufacturing Company in Chester.

Higgins learned in 1897 about a new product called "Alundum," which is said to have exelled in grinding materials. Following this, Norton abrasive products appear with aluminum oxide in it in 1901, the same year when a new alundum plant was built. Another plant was built by him on 1900 called the Norton Grinding Company, focusing on the manufacture of grinding machinery. After 1906, emery was not used within Norton products, and the company renamed itself the Norton Company, dropping the "Emery Wheel" in its name.

The first product of the Grinding Company was the Norton Plain Machine for Cylindrical Grinding, made by Norton employee, Charles Hotchkiss Norton. By 1910s, plants were built on Chippawa, Ontario, and a subsidiary was built on Wesseling, Germany, called the Deutsche Norton Gesellschaft.

=== Later years and death ===
In 1904, together with his son, John Woodman, they incorporated the Worcester Ferrule and Manufacturing Company into Norton and reorganized it as the Worcester Pressed Steel Company. The purpose of the incorporation was the development of another pioneer manufactory that John was interested in. Milton appointed himself as president with Alden as treasurer of the Pressed Steel Company, with John being the general manager. Milton would withdrew from management of the company in 1910, with John replacing him as president of the Company. The Company is now called the Higgins Armory Museum, a museum dedicated to arms and armor.

By 1911, sponsored as president in the incorporation of the Sanford Riley Stoker Company, dedicated on the manufacturing of stokers with his son-in-law, Robert Sanford Riley, as chief promoter. Before the Stoker Company went underway, Higgins died in March 7, 1912 at Worcester, Massachusetts.

== Personal life ==
Higgins married on June 15, 1870, to Katherine Elizabeth Chapin at Manchester, New Hampshire. Chapin was known to be one of the pioneers of the Parent–Teacher Association. They had four children together:

- Aldus Chapin Higgins, lawyer and businessman
- John Woodman Higgins, steel magnate
- Katherine Elizabeth Higgins, wife of Robert Sanford Riley
- Olive Higgins Prouty, novelist and poet
