= Frederick Daniels =

Fred or Frederick Daniels may refer to:

- Frederick H. Daniels (1853–1913), American engineer and corporate director
  - Frederick Daniels House, built 1885 in Worcester, Massachusetts, listed on National Register of Historic Places in 1980
- Fred Daniels (1892–1959), English pioneer of still photography in film industry
- Fred Daniels (baseball) (1893–1993), American pitcher in Negro leagues
