= Mark Huntington Higgins =

Mark Huntington Higgins (June 26, 1940 – July 25, 1960) was an American student employed in Lambarene, Gabon, West Africa by Albert Schweitzer from May 1959 to June 1960.

== Early and personal life ==
Mark Huntington Higgins was born to Carter Chapin Higgins and Katharine Bigelow. His paternal grandfather John Woodman Higgins founded the Higgins Armory Museum in Worcester, Mass. His older brother was Dick Higgins and his younger sister is Lisa Higgins Null. Mark Higgins was schooled in Worcester and at Milton Academy. Following graduation from prep school, he spent one year in psychiatric rehabilitation before leveraging his family's connections to go to work for the Albert Schweitzer Hospital in Lambarene, Gabon, Africa.

At the Schweitzer Hospital, he was assigned general handyman duties and progressed to becoming a medical technician who assisted a team of American cardiologists in identifying the causes of heart disease among certain tribes of Gabon.

Higgins ventured from the Schweitzer Hospital following one year of assigned work, and began a land-based journey that was to take him to Israel. First, he had to cross through the Belgian Congo, which in July 1960 had just acquired independence from Belgium.

He succeeded in crossing the newly independent Democratic Republic of the Congo by steamboat, railway and on a commercant (commercial truck) as far as Kasongo in Kivu Province. He was detained in Kivu due to internal strife and the war of Congolese independence. Higgins was mistaken for a Belgian spy and murdered in Kasongo on July 25, 1960. Two months passed before the U.S. State Department and his family were notified of his death, which was widely reported in American media, notably with a full-page story in LIFE Magazine on October 31, 1960 ("Last Journey for an idealistic American"), and a two-column story in Time Magazine on October 31, 1960 ("The Wanted American").

Higgins is memorialized in the book entitled "Against the Current: How Albert Schweitzer Inspired a Young Man's Journey" (Oakham Press, Westport, Connecticut, 2014).

== Death ==
Higgins died on July 25, 1960, in Kasongo, Democratic Republic of the Congo, and is buried in Rural Cemetery (Worcester, Massachusetts).
