= Robert Sanford Riley =

Canadian-American manufacturer and inventor (1874–1926)

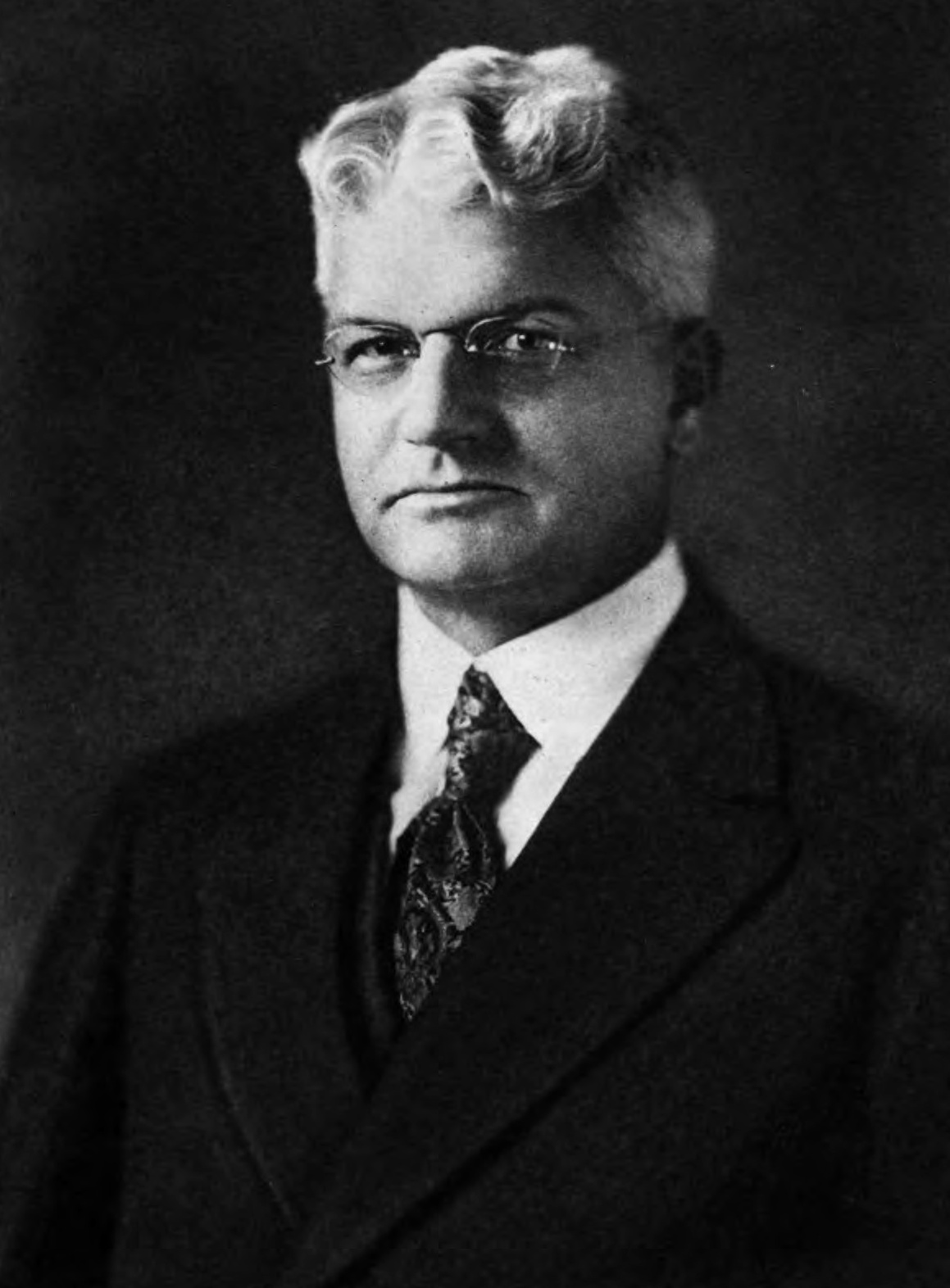
- Born: July 26, 1874; Hamilton, Ontario, Canada
- Died: May 7, 1926 (aged 51); Worcester, Massachusetts, United States
- Other name: R. Sanford Riley
- Education: University of Winnipeg Collegiate; Worcester Polytechnic Institute (BS)
- Occupations: Engineer, manufacturer
- Spouse: Katherine E. Higgins (m. 1904)
- Children: 5
- Relatives: Milton Prince Higgins (father-in-law); Aldus Chapin Higgins (brother-in-law); John Woodman Higgins (brother-in-law); Olive Higgins Prouty (sister-in-law)
- Military career
- Allegiance: United States of America (USA)
- Branch: United States Navy
- Service years: 1900–1906
- Rank: Chief Engineer
- Conflicts: Boxer Rebellion

Robert Sanford Riley (July 26, 1874 – May 7, 1926) was a Canadian-American engineer, inventor, and manufacturer. The Sanford Riley Hall, the first residential hall of the Worcester Polytechnic Institute, has been named after him.

== Early life and education ==
Riley was born on July 26, 1874, in Hamilton, Ontario, to Harriet Murgatroyd and Robert Thomas Riley. Both of his parents descended from Yorkshire ancestors with his great-grandfather being an officer at the Napoleonic Wars.

He spent his boyhood in Winnipeg and attended the University of Winnipeg Collegiate. He served apprenticeship in mechanical engineering at the Northern Pacific Railroad in Winnipeg from 1890 to 1893. After serving his apprenticeship, he graduated with a B.S. in Mechanical Engineering with honors at the Worcester Polytechnic Institute in the class of 1896. During his time in college, he was president of his class, editor of the class book The Aftermath, and played center on the football team.

== Career ==
After graduating from WPI, he spent first year teaching at Atlanta University (now part of Clark Atlanta University) and his second year at the Washburn Shops in his alma mater.

Riley then served as a machinist at Baldwin Locomotive Works, before becoming a draftsman at William Cramp & Sons. He then returned to Winnipeg to become a foreman of the Canadian Pacific Railroad in 1899.

He then became an assistant engineer on the RMS Empress of China in 1900, running from Vancouver to Hong Kong. Afterwards, he joined the Asiatic Fleet and served through the Boxer Rebellion in China, later assisting the U.S. Navy with the capture of Emilio Aguinaldo in the Philippines. He returned home via the Indian Ocean and Suez Canal as the chief engineer of the United States Naval Auxiliary Service serving in the USS Arethusa. He later retired from the Navy in 1903 and decided to work as an assistant to the chief engineer of the New York Shipbuilding Corporation of Camden, New Jersey for two years.

When Riley became President of the American Ship Windlass Company in 1906, he became interested with the development of combustion equipments. He would redesign and improve an underfeed mechanical stoker, called the Taylor Underfeed Stoker, after the previous inventor died and left the device in a crude form. After seeing that the device became a commercial success, he sold out its interests from the company in 1911 and founded his own company called the Sanford Riley Stoker Company in Worcester, Massachusetts. The company manufactured and marketed the Riley Self-dumping Underfeed Stoker, which he patented in 1914.

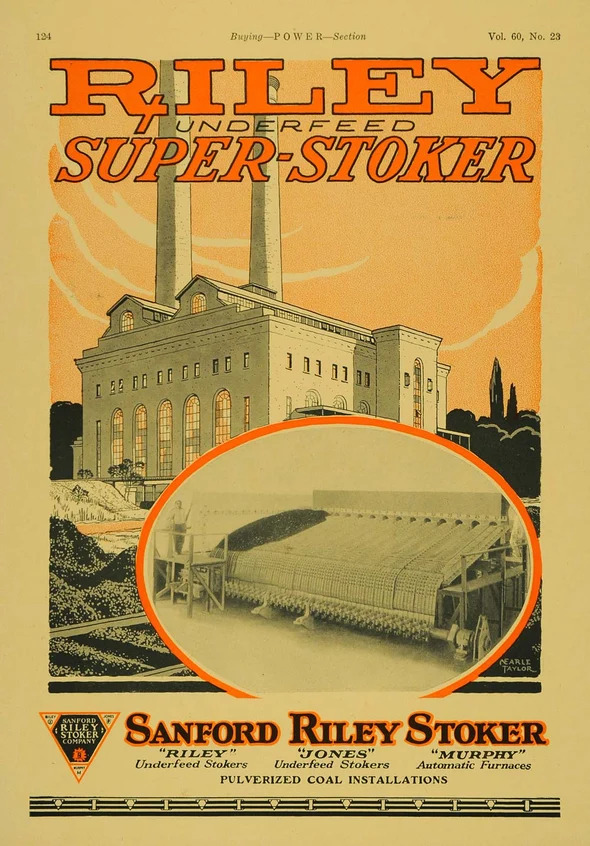
Advertisement for Sanford Riley Stoker in 1924

The company then reorganized into the Riley Stoker Corporation and acquired numerous types of stokers through the purchase of other companies such as the Murphy Iron Works, the United Machine and Manufacturing Co., the Underfeed Stoker Co., the A. W. Cash Co., and the Craig Dampner Regulator Co.

During World War I, Riley was appointed director of the testing and performance department of the Emergency Fleet Corporation in 1918 under Charles M. Schwab.

He was also the director of multiple companies, such as the Norton Company, the Riley Stoker Co., Ltd. in London, the Riley Engineering Supply Co. in Hamilton, and the A. W. Cash Co. in Decatur, Illinois. He was also President of the Worcester Chamber of Commerce from 1916 to 1917, where he is said to be an example of what an engineer can do in civic affairs.

He had also served as the President of the WPI Alumni Association and vice-president of Worcester's Young Men Christian Association.

Riley died on May 7, 1926, in Worcester, Massachusetts. He was nominated for a position at the board of trustees at WPI, but he died before the election could be made. At the time of his death, more than fifty patents were issued to him or were in process. The trustees of WPI unanimously agreed on the name of Riley to be associated to their first residential hall in the institute. Today, the Sanford Riley Hall still stands as the oldest residential hall in the institute.

== Personal life ==
During his time in college, Riley was a member of the Sigma Alpha Epsilon fraternity. He was also a member of the American Society of Naval Architects and Marine Engineers, where he held the certificate of Extra First Class Engineer issued by the British board of trade and the certificate of Chief Engineer in the United States.

He also served as member of the American Society of Mechanical Engineers, the Appalachian Mountain Club and the American Alpine Club. He attended the Congregationalist Church and was interested in the local YMCA.

Riley was said to have been a Progressive Republican interested in civic affairs.

He married in 1904 to Katherine E. Higgins, daughter of Milton P. Higgins, where they had five children together.
