= Olive Higgins Prouty =

American novelist and poet (1882–1974)

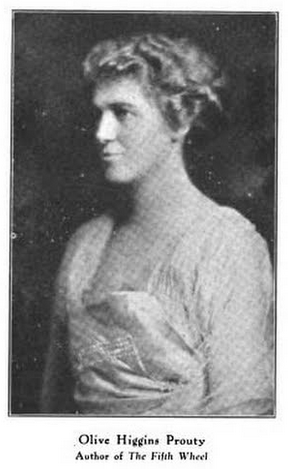
- Born: Olive Higgins; January 10, 1882; Worcester, Massachusetts
- Died: March 24, 1974 (aged 92); Brookline, Massachusetts
- Burial place: Walnut Hills Cemetery; Brookline, Massachusetts
- Education: Smith College
- Occupations: Novelist, poet
- Notable work: Stella Dallas
- Spouse: Lewis I. Prouty (m. 1907)
- Children: 4
- Father: Milton Prince Higgins
- Relatives: Aldus Chapin Higgins (brother); John Woodman Higgins (brother); Robert Sanford Riley (brother-in-law)

Olive Higgins Prouty (January 10, 1882 – March 24, 1974) was an American novelist and poet, best known for her 1923 novel Stella Dallas and her pioneering consideration of psychotherapy in her 1941 novel Now, Voyager.

== Early life ==
Olive Higgins was born and raised in Worcester, Massachusetts, to Milton Prince Higgins and Katherine Chapin. In 1894, she was reported to have suffered a nervous breakdown that lasted nearly two years.

She was a 1904 graduate of Smith College and married Lewis I. Prouty in 1907. The couple moved to Brookline, Massachusetts in 1908. They had four children: Richard, Jane, Alice and Olivia; the latter two predeceased their mother. Following the death of her daughter, Olivia, in 1923, Prouty suffered from another nervous breakdown in 1925.

== Career ==
Her poetry collection was published posthumously by Friends of the Goddard Library at Clark University, as Between the Barnacles and Bayberries: and Other Poems in 1997 after it was released for publication by her children, Richard and Jane. In 1961, Prouty wrote her memoirs, but as her public profile had diminished, she could not find a publisher, so had them printed at her own expense.

Prouty's best-remembered writings are the five Vale novels, particularly the third in the series, Now, Voyager, which delves into the psychology of a woman, Charlotte Vale, who has lived too long under the thumb of an overbearing mother. An important character in the novel is Charlotte's psychiatrist, Dr. Jaquith, based on the fictionalization of Prouty's own therapy. He urges her to live her life to the fullest, taking to heart the words of Walt Whitman, "Now, Voyager, sail thou forth, to seek and find." Thanks in part to the help of Dr. Jaquith, but mostly thanks to having inherited her motherʼs fortune, by the end of the book, Charlotte is very much enjoying her life as a Vale of Boston.

Prouty is also known for her philanthropic works and her resulting association with writer Sylvia Plath, whom she encountered as a result of endowing a Smith College scholarship for "promising young writers". She supported Plath financially in the wake of Plath's unsuccessful 1953 suicide attempt: Plath's husband, Ted Hughes, would later refer in Birthday Letters to how “Prouty was there, tender and buoyant moon”. Many, including Plath's mother Aurelia, have held the view that Plath employed her memories of Prouty as the basis of the character of Philomena Guinea in her 1963 novel, The Bell Jar, a figure who is described as supporting the protagonist because "at the peak of her career, she had been in an asylum, as well", and who arguably represents a role model to be ultimately rejected by the protagonist.

Stella Dallas was adapted into a stage play in 1924, a movie in 1925, and a popular 1937 melodrama of the same title starring Barbara Stanwyck that was nominated for two Academy Awards. It was remade in 1990 starring Bette Midler. A derivative radio serial was broadcast daily for 18 years, despite the legal efforts of Prouty, who had not authorized the sale of the broadcast rights, and was displeased with her characters' portrayals. Now, Voyager was made into a film of the same name in 1942, directed by Irving Rapper and starring Bette Davis in an acclaimed, Academy Award-nominated performance, as well as into a radio drama starring Ida Lupino and produced by Cecil B. de Mille on the Lux Radio Theater.

== Retirement and death ==
Prouty wrote her last novel in 1951, the year of her husband's death. For the rest of her life, she lived quietly in the house in Brookline, Massachusetts, where she had moved in 1913 and where she died.

She financed a scholarship to her alma mater, Smith College. The most famous recipient was the poet and novelist Sylvia Plath, whose talent was nurtured by Prouty. When Plath was hospitalized for psychiatric treatment at McLean Hospital, Prouty covered her expenses. Prouty stood by Plath until the latter's death in February 1963. Prouty's Now, Voyager was one of the models for Plath's The Bell Jar.

In old age, Prouty found comfort in her friendships, her charitable work, and the Unitarian Church, which her family had joined in the early 1920s.

== Legacy ==
In 1956 Prouty provided funding for the Prouty Memorial Garden and Terrace at Children's Hospital in Boston, created by the Olmsted Brothers landscape architecture firm. The garden, in memory of her two deceased children, is registered with the National Association for Olmsted Parks, and was honored with a gold medal by the Massachusetts Horticulture Society. As of 2015 the hospital was considering replacing the garden with more buildings in the space occupied by the garden.

Guidestar lists an Olive Higgins Prouty Foundation, Inc.

== Works ==
=== Novels ===
- Bobbie, General Manager (1913)
- The Fifth Wheel (1916)
- The Star in the Window (1918)
- Good Sports (1919)
- Stella Dallas (1923)
- Conflict (1927)
- The White Fawn (1931), Lisa Vale (1938), Now, Voyager (1941), Home Port (1947), and Fabia (1951), all focusing on the fictional Vale family

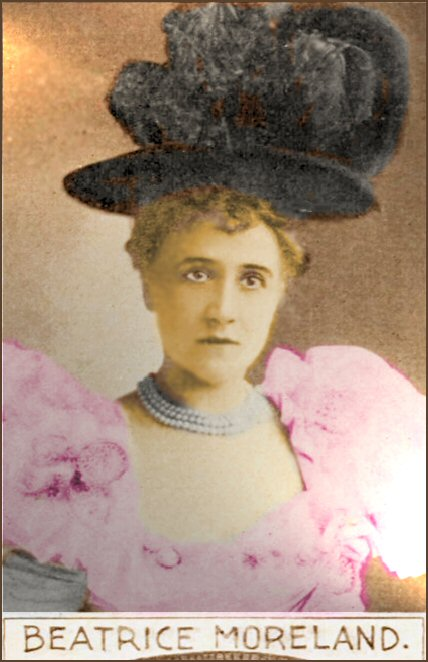
ca. 1896

=== Memoirs ===
- Pencil Shavings (1961)

=== Theatrical adaptations ===
Belknap: "Stella Dallas : Book by Gertrude Purcell and Harry Wagstaff Gribble (from the novel by Olive Higgins Prouty). Produced by the Selwyns in New Haven (No specific location listed - No date) starring Mrs. Leslie Carter (Caroline Louise Dudley - 'The American Sarah Bernhardt'), Edward G. Robinson, Kay Harrison, Albert Marsh, Philip Earle, Clara Moores, Ruth Darby, Beatrice Moreland, Almeda Fowler, Guy Milham, etc. Directed by Priestly Morrison."

== See also ==
- Sentimental novel
