= Against the Current =

Against the Current may refer to:

== Film ==
- Against the Current (film), a 2009 film starring Joseph Fiennes, Elizabeth Reaser and Justin Kirk

== Television ==
- Against the Current (TV series), a 2026 Chinese television series

== Print media ==
- Against the Current: Essays in the History of Ideas, 1979 book
- Against the Current (journal), the journal of the American socialist group Solidarity
- Against the Current: How Albert Schweitzer Inspired a Young Man's Journey, 2014 book about Mark Huntington Higgins

== Music ==
- Against the Current (band), a pop rock band from Poughkeepsie, New York
- Against the Current, also known as Contra La Corriente, a 1997 album by Marc Anthony
- Boats Against the Current, a 1977 album by Eric Carmen

== See also ==
- Countercurrent (disambiguation)
