= Aldus Chapin Higgins =

American lawyer, inventor, and businessman (1872–1948)

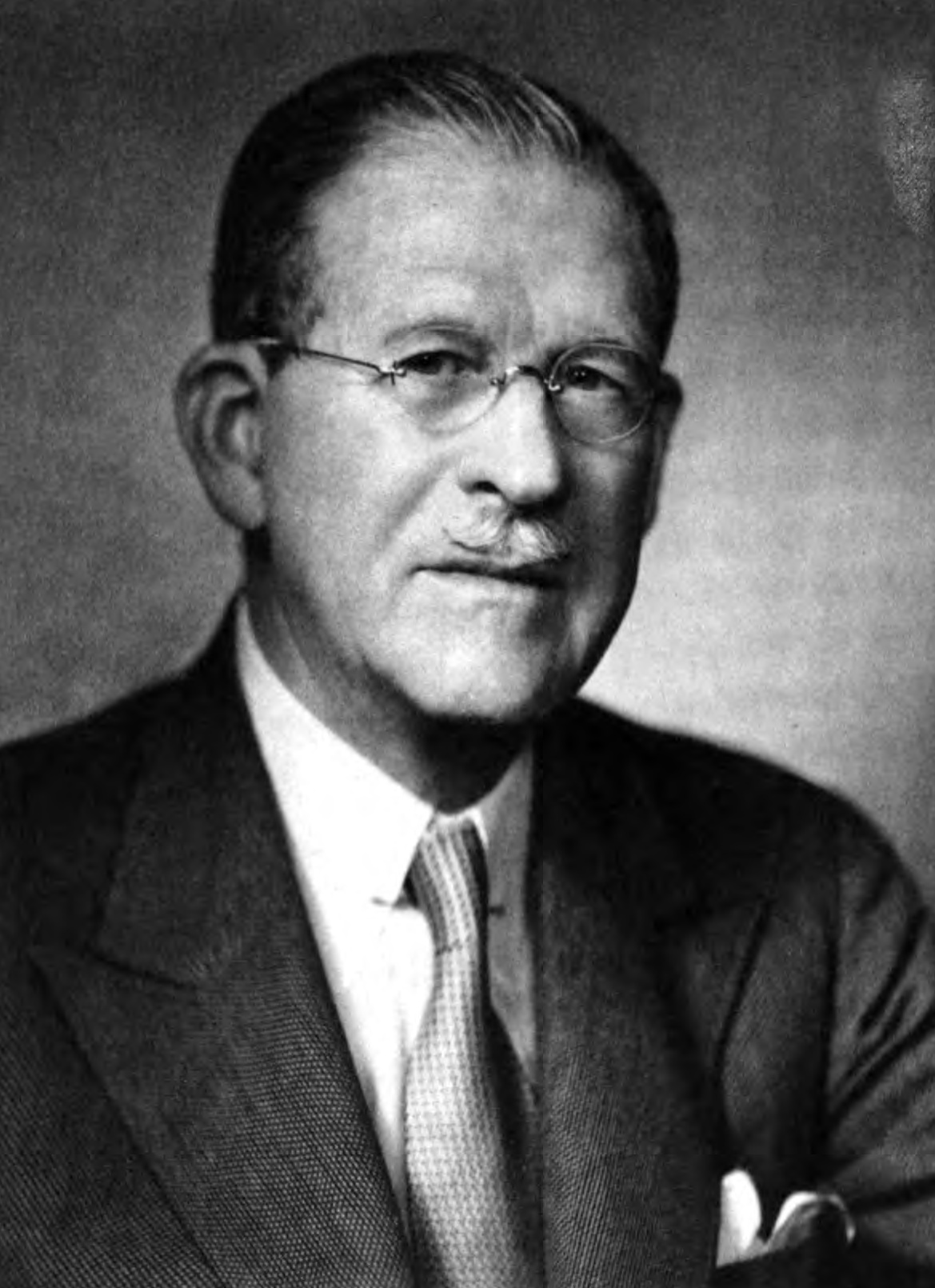
- Born: December 7, 1872; Worcester, Massachusetts, US
- Died: September 10, 1948 (aged 75); Worcester, Massachusetts, US
- Burial place: Rural Cemetery (Worcester, Massachusetts)
- Education: Worcester Polytechnic Institute; National University School of Law
- Occupations: Lawyer, inventor
- Spouse(s): Edgenie Gertude Brosius (m. 1898-1911) Mary Sprague Green (m. 1914)
- Father: Milton Prince Higgins
- Relatives: John Woodman Higgins (brother); Olive Higgins Prouty (sister); Robert Sanford Riley (brother-in-law)
- Awards: John Scott Medal

Aldus Chapin Higgins (December 7, 1872 – September 10, 1948) was an American lawyer, inventor, and businessman.

== Early life ==
Aldus Higgins was born December 7, 1872, in Worcester, Massachusetts to Milton P. Higgins and Katherine Chapin. Milton was a founder of the Norton Company and superintendent of the Washburn Shops. As a teenager, Higgins attended Worcester High School. He attended Worcester Polytechnic Institute and graduated in 1893. For several months afterwards, he worked as a machinist in one of his father's shops, after which he entered the National University Law School in Washington, D.C. At this time, Higgins was appointed assistant examiner in the U.S. Post Office.

== Career ==
Upon receiving his law degree in 1896, Higgins resigned his job at the post office, returned to Worcester, and was admitted to the Massachusetts Bar. He opened his own practice, specializing in patent law for several years. While doing this, he was in charge of the patent and legal matters of the Norton Companies, which demanded so much time and attention that he retired from the general practice of law and began working exclusively for the Norton companies. In 1901, while managing an electric-furnace plant in New York, Higgins invented a water-cooled electric-furnace in which alundum was made commercially. For this invention, he received the John Scott Medal and Premium Award from the City of Philadelphia in 1913.

== Family ==
In 1898, Higgins married his first wife, Edgenie Gertrude Brosius. After she died, Higgins married Mary Sprague Green in 1914.

== Later life ==
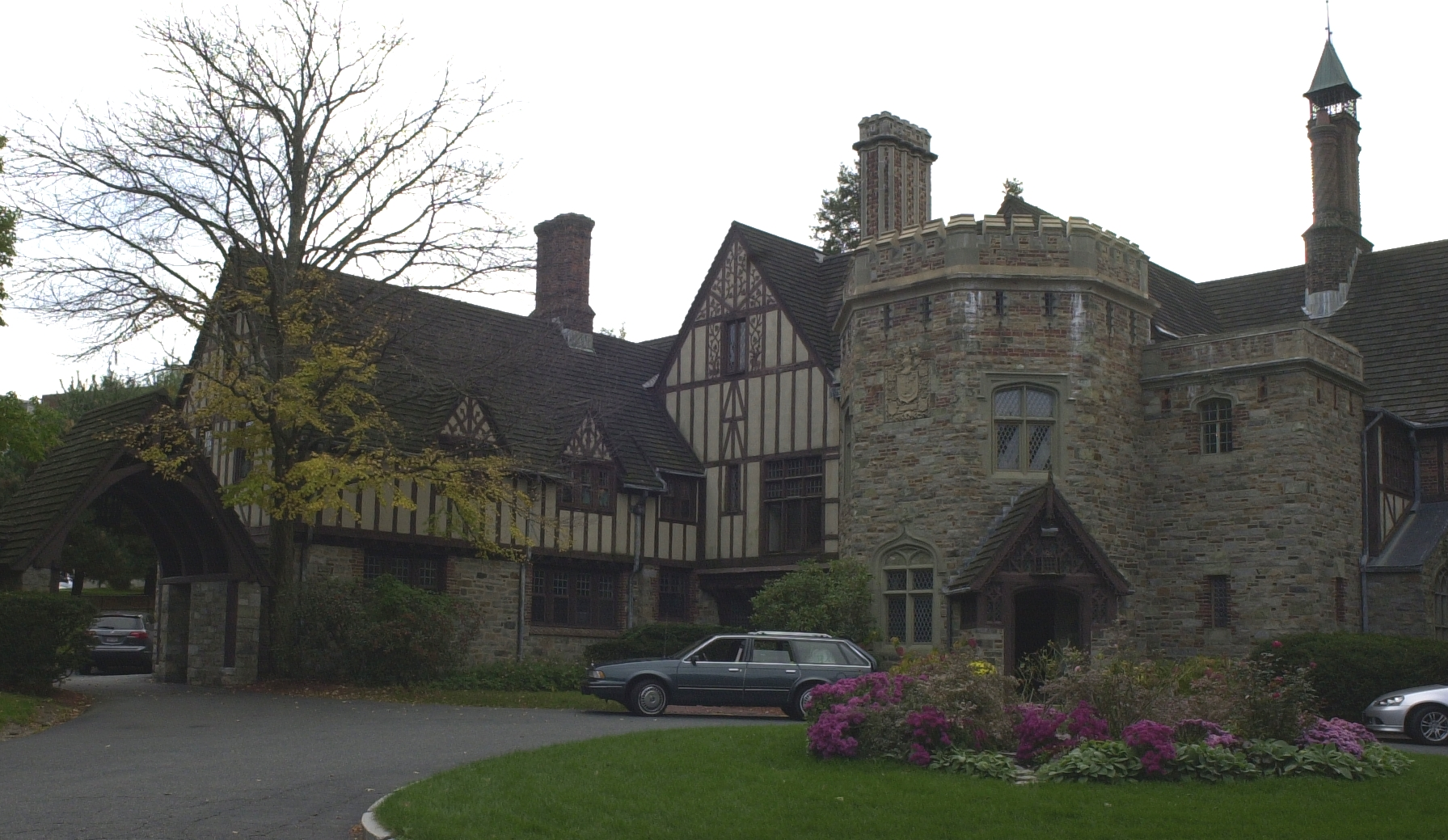
Aldus Chapin Higgins House

In 1921, Higgins commissioned Grosvenor Atterbury to design a house modeled after the Compton Wynyates estate in England. It is an eclectic structure 2 1/2 stories in height, with its exterior finished in stucco, brick, and stone. It consists of two roughly rectangular wings, set at right angles to each other and joined by a central octagonal entry. The octagonal tower is crowned by a crenellated battlement. The upper levels are generally finished in half-timbered stucco, in some places decorated by additional foliate carvings. Many of its leaded casement windows are antiques shipped from Europe, and the house's Great Hall has architectural features removed from an Italian monastery. After the death of Mary Higgins, the house was donated to Worcester Polytechnic Institute in 1971, and now houses the Office of Alumni Relations.

Aldus Higgins died September 10, 1948, and was buried in Rural Cemetery in Worcester.
