= George Hull Ward =

Union officer in the American Civil War

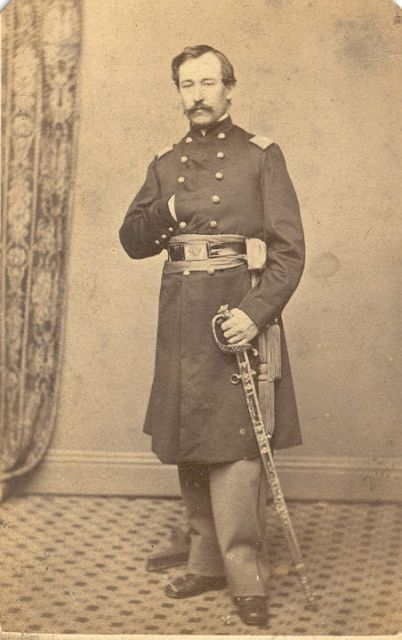
- Born: April 26, 1826; Worcester, Massachusetts, U.S.
- Died: July 3, 1863 (aged 37)
- Burial place: Rural Cemetery
- Military career
- Allegiance: USA
- Branch: Union Army
- Rank: Brigadier general
- Commands: 15th Massachusetts Volunteer Infantry
- Conflicts: American Civil War: Battle of Ball's Bluff Battle of Gettysburg

George Hull Ward (April 26, 1826 – July 3, 1863) was a soldier and Union officer in the American Civil War.

== Early life ==
Ward was born in Worcester, Massachusetts, and educated in the common schools. He married Emily E. Mayo on June 5, 1851. In 1852, Ward rose to command the Worcester City Guards, a local militia company.

== Civil War ==
With the outbreak of the Civil War, Ward enlisted in the Union Army. On July 24, 1861, he was mustered into the 15th Massachusetts Volunteer Infantry with the rank of lieutenant colonel to fill an original vacancy. On October 21, 1861, he was wounded in action at the Battle of Ball's Bluff and his left foot was amputated.

In 1862, Ward was promoted to the rank of colonel, and in 1863, he commanded the 15th Massachusetts, which was part of the 1st Brigade, 2nd Division, II Corps in the Army of the Potomac. On July 2, 1863, during the Battle of Gettysburg, Ward's regiment was heavily engaged on the Union left-center along Cemetery Ridge and Colonel Ward, along with 36 others, was mortally wounded. He died the following day and is buried in the Rural Cemetery, Worcester.

== In memoriam ==
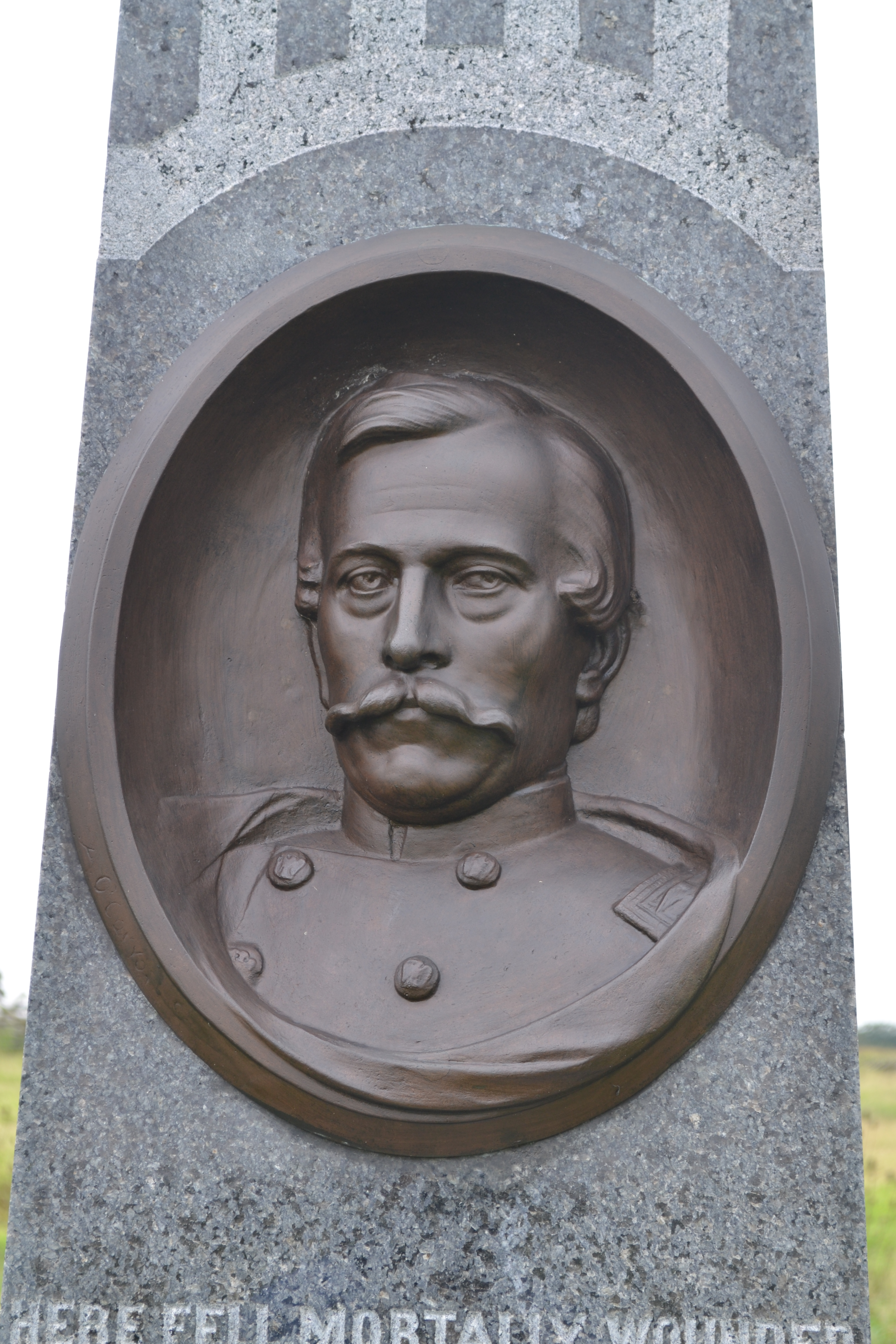
Monument to Ward at Gettysburg

On July 17, 1868, Ward was posthumously appointed to the rank of brevet brigadier general, ranking from July 2, 1863, for "gallant and meritorious services in the battle of Ball's Bluff, VA, October 21, 1861, and in the battle of Gettysburg, PA, where he was killed."

Fort Ward on Bainbridge Island, Washington was named in his honor.

A small stone monument in the Gettysburg Battlefield marks the approximate location where Ward was struck by the fatal shell fragment.

== See also ==
- List of Massachusetts generals in the American Civil War
