= Alden Research Laboratory =

Coordinates: 42°20′13″N 71°50′4″W

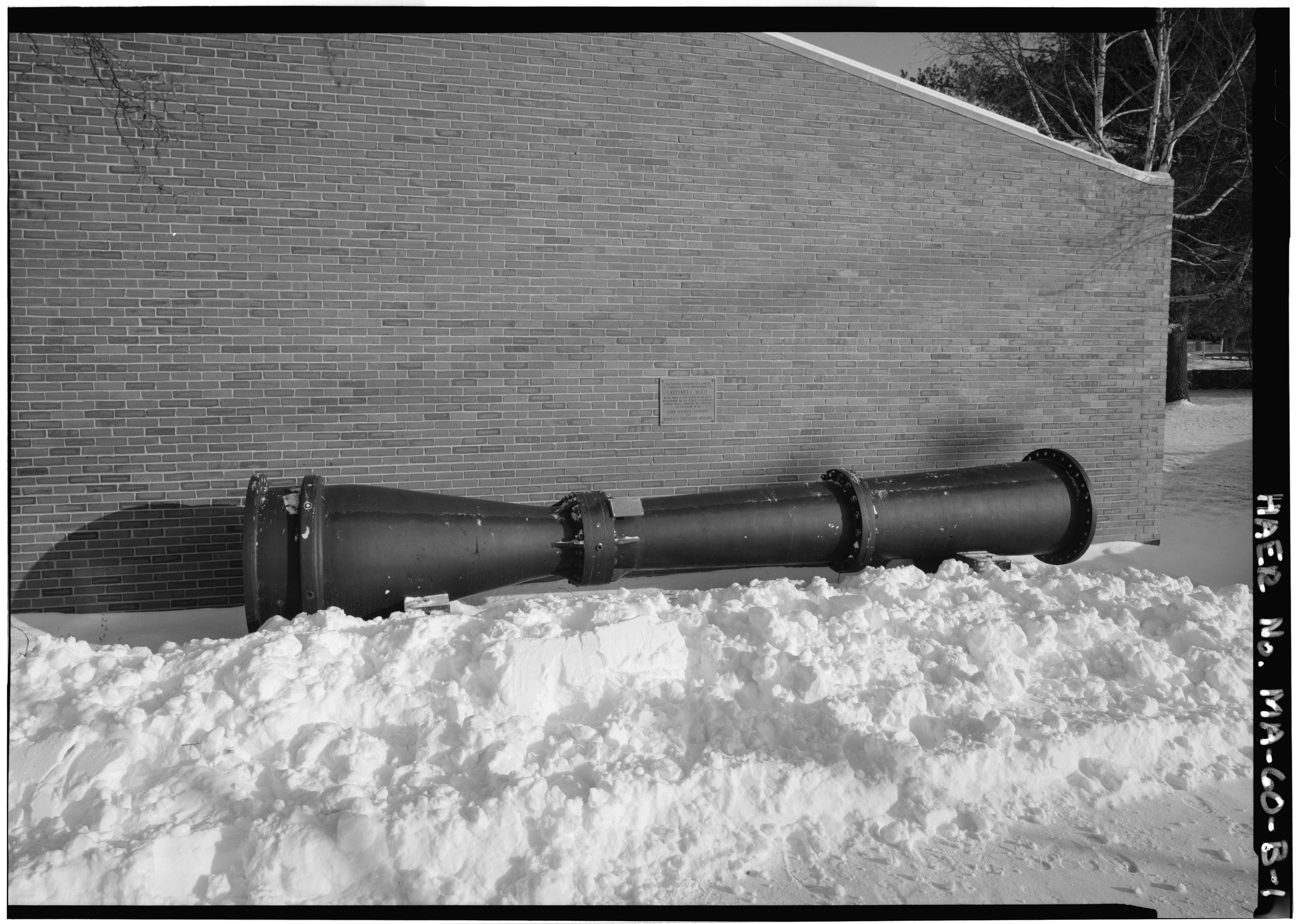
Alden Research Laboratory's historic Venturi meter

Verdantas Flow Labs (previously Alden Research Laboratory) is the oldest continuously operating hydraulic laboratory in the United States. Today, as an independent entity, Verdantas has become a recognized leader in the field of fluid dynamics research and development. Alden was founded in 1894 as part of Worcester Polytechnic Institute (WPI) in Holden, Massachusetts.

== History ==
=== Industrial Revolution ===
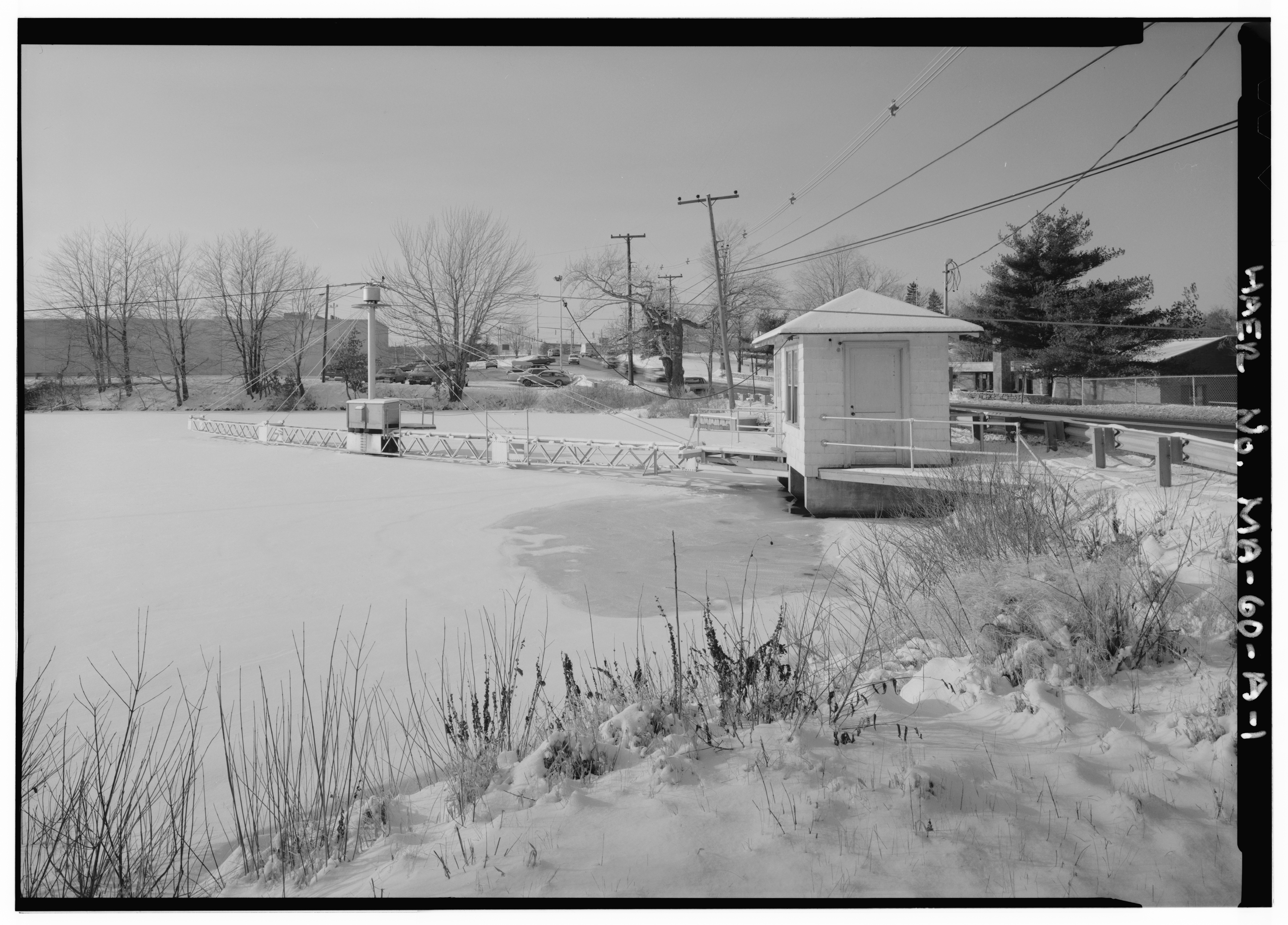
Rotating boom, now an ASME Historic Landmark

In light of the industrial revolution, the widespread use of water powered mills, and the need for higher and higher efficiencies, Professor George I. Alden of WPI saw the need for a new lab. The Hydraulic Testing Lab at WPI was established in 1894 on the site of an old woolen mill donated to the institute by Stephen Salisbury III. It was the third of its kind in the US. The first two instruments obtained for the lab, a wooden framed structure only 90' by 40', were a copper-lined weigh tank on a Fairbanks scale from the Philadelphia Centennial Exposition, and a 36" by 16" Herschel Venturi flow meter from the 1893 Chicago Columbian Exposition. These state of the art instruments were used by students to conduct experiments on the efficiency of full sized turbines, measure flows and head loss, and test a hydraulic ram. In 1908 a wooden rotating boom was constructed on one of the ponds on the property to test large hydraulic equipment including current meters. In 1911 it was replaced by a steel boom which was used for the same purpose and eventually to test airplane propellers; it is now an ASME Historic Landmark. Over 270 landmarks have been designated by the ASME.

=== Mid-Century ===
Alden contributed to the war effort in the 1940s through studies of the physics of the entry of projectiles into water. Early high speed photography equipment was developed for use with strobe lights to document the effect of projectile shape on entry stability in large glass sided tanks.

During the 1950s, the increase in power use demanded expansion of generation capacity and led to increased use of physical models for solving problems with circulating water systems, including the use of hydro-thermal modeling to meet water quality requirements. This need resulted in the construction of 10 large test sheds to house these models. Physical models were applied to various flow problems such as pump intakes, emergency core cooling sumps, riverine problems, etc.

=== Incorporation ===
In 1986 the Alden Hydraulic Lab became Alden Research Laboratory and was incorporated as an entity separate from WPI. Since that time Alden has added on to its original Hydraulic and Calibration Groups and formed its Environmental, Numeric, Air and Gas, and Field Service Groups.

== Major Innovations ==
In recent history, Alden's team of engineers have worked on several influential projects including:

- The design and testing of the Alden/NREC Fish Friendly Turbine
- And the writing of EPRI's "Wet Stack Design Guide"

== Acquisition of the Redmond, Washington Laboratory ==
Alden acquired AECOM's hydraulic engineering and modeling laboratory in Redmond, Wash., and hired the associated staff on August 18, 2012. Combining the modeling talents and fisheries knowledge of Alden staff with the 34 years of hydraulic modeling and fisheries engineering experience of the AECOM hydraulic engineering and modeling operation, Alden created the largest commercial hydraulic engineering laboratory system in North America.

The Redmond laboratory was formerly known as the "ENSR hydraulics lab," and became part of AECOM in 2005 when AECOM acquired ENSR. Charles "Chick" Sweeney, P.E., started the independent hydraulic modeling laboratory in 1978. The hydraulics lab had been a leader in the optimization of hydraulic structures and fish passage systems associated with hydroelectric power generation, working especially closely with federal agencies and hydroelectric power utilities in the Pacific Northwest. Additionally, the group has helped municipal utilities to ensure proper performance of pump stations and water conveyance systems. Capabilities include physical hydraulic modeling, 1-D and 2-D numeric modeling, 3-D computational fluid dynamics (CFD) modeling, fisheries and hydraulic engineering design, and field services.

Alden had been expanding geographically in recent years, having opened up an office in Fort Collins, Colo., in 2009, and establishing a presence in Portland, Ore., in 2011. This addition was a major milestone in an ongoing effort to better serve clients in the U.S. and internationally

=== Merge With Clemson ===
In 2020, the Alden Research Lab merged with Clemson Engineering Hydraulics to form Verdantas Flow Labs, a hydraulic lab dedicated to environmental and engineering research. They now have 99 office locations throughout the country.

== Verdantas Today ==
=== Hydraulic Modeling ===
Verdantas' Hydraulic Modeling Group conducts model studies for hydropower intakes, flood and drainage canals, spillway discharge systems, water and waste water systems, industrial flow processes, ocean energy technologies, navigation models, and many other flow related projects. Both physical and computational fluid dynamics (CFD) modeling are used.

=== Environmental ===
The Environmental Group at Verdantas' evaluate fish protection technologies, alternative technologies, cooling water intake structures, upstream and downstream fish passage designs, hydroelectric entrainment and mortality, and aid in strategic planning for 316(b) compliance.

=== Air and Gas Flow Modeling ===
The Air and Gas Modeling Group at Verdantas is responsible for modeling many aspects of fossil fueled power plants and air pollution control systems. This group also uses both physical and computational models.

=== Numeric Modeling ===
Verdantas' Numeric Modeling Group solves many complex flow-related problems involving liquid and gas flows, hydraulic flows, heat and mass transfer, as well as particles and sprays.

=== Calibration ===
Verdantas is the largest independent supplier of National Institute of Standards and Technology (NIST) traceable water flow meter calibrations in the United States.
