= Rural Cemetery (Worcester, Massachusetts) =

Historic cemetery

Coordinates: 42°16′51″N 71°48′7″W

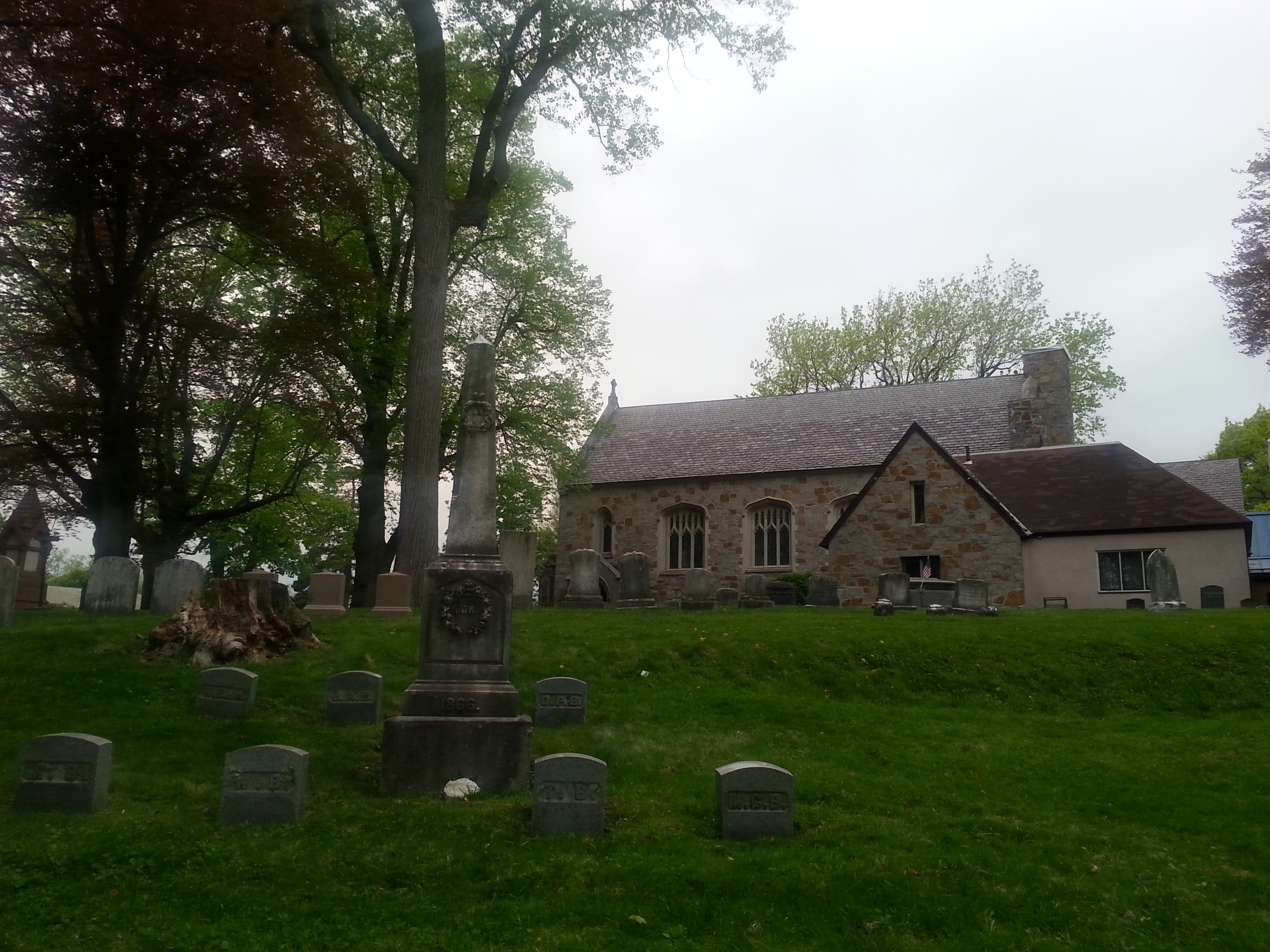
Rural Cemetery, Worcester

Rural Cemetery is located on 180 Grove Street in Worcester, Massachusetts. More than 13,000 people are buried at the cemetery, including congressmen, mayors, governors, and professional people.

== History ==
The cemetery was incorporated in 1838 on the quiet outskirts of town, at the suggestion of Edward D. Bangs in 1837 to serve as the town's cemetery, the older cemeteries having been neglected, overpopulated, or trampled by livestock. David Waldo donated rolling, treed land he purchased for $1400 in September 1837. It was located on the road leading to Holden from Worcester, which was previously owned by Judge Timothy Paine. The state legislature passed the bill and signed by Governor Edward Everett to incorporate the "Proprietors of Rural Cemetery in Worcester". A portion of the land was set aside for a garden and the design included shrubs, trees and "other rural ornaments".

A key goal in the founding of the rural cemetery was to create an ongoing memorial to the people who had passed in the trend established by "America's first garden cemetery" or "rural cemetery", Mount Auburn Cemetery which was founded in Massachusetts in 1831 with classical monuments set in a rolling landscaped terrain.

It has been the care of all ages of the world, and of all nations of men, to mark with tokens of affection and respect, the disposition of the remains of the dead.

— Levi Lincoln, Massachusetts Governor at the dedication ceremony.

By the 1860s rural cemeteries could be found on the outskirts of cities and smaller towns across the country.

It was originally situated on 24 acres, and is now 40 acres in area.

== Notable interments ==
- Charles Allen (1797–1869), United States House of Representatives
- George Bancroft (1800–1891), U.S. Secretary of the Navy, historian
- Abijah Bigelow (1775–1860), U.S. Representative member
- George B. Boomer (1832–1863), Union Army Brigadier General
- Alexander Bullock (1816–1882), Governor of Massachusetts
- Jonas Gilman Clark (1815–1900), businessman, philanthropist and founder of Clark University
- John Davis (1787–1854), United States House of Representatives, Governor of Massachusetts
- John Milton Earle (1794–1874), businessman, abolitionist and statesman
- Andrew Haswell Green (1820-1903), lawyer, city planner, civic leader in New York City
- Isabel Florence Hapgood (1850–1928), writer, translator
- Aldus Chapin Higgins (1872–1948), businessman and lawyer
- John Woodman Higgins (1874–1961), Higgins Armory Museum owner
- Rockwood Hoar (1855–1906), United States House of Representatives member
- Helen M. Knowlton (1832–1918), painter, author and educator
- Levi Lincoln Jr. (1772–1868), United States House of Representatives, Governor of Massachusetts
- Levi Lincoln Sr. (1749–1820), United States Attorney General, U.S. Secretary of State, Massachusetts Governor
- William Whitney Rice (1826–1896), United States House of Representatives member
- George W. Richardson (1808–1888), mayor of Worcester
- John Randolph Thayer (1845–1916), United States House of Representatives member
- Scofield Thayer (1889–1982), poet and publisher
- Isaiah Thomas (1749–1831), American Revolutionary, newspaper publisher and author
- Joseph H. Walker (1829–1899), United States House of Representatives member
- Ruth Sawtell Wallis (1895–1978), anthropologist
- Wilson Dallam Wallis (1886–1970), anthropologist
- George Hull Ward (1826–1863), Brigadier General, Union Army
- Charles G. Washburn (1906–1911), United States House of Representatives member
- Ichabod Washburn (1798–1868), industrialist
- Robert M. Washburn (1868–1946), politician and writer
- Fanny Bullock Workman (1859–1925), travel writer and mountaineer

== See also ==
- Hope Cemetery (Worcester, Massachusetts)
