= Countercurrent =

Countercurrent may refer to:

- Countercurrent pool
- Countercurrent exchange
- Countercurrent chromatography
- Equatorial Counter Current
- Countercurrents.org, an Indian news website
- two political party factions in Italy:
  - Countercurrent (PRC faction, Italy), a faction of the Communist Refoundation Party
  - Countercurrent (PdL faction, Italy), a faction of The People of Freedom
- Countercurrent, an Italian political party

== See also ==
- Counter currency, an element of a currency pair in foreign exchange
- Against the Current (disambiguation)
