= Indian Hill-North Village =

- U.S. National Register of Historic Places
- U.S. Historic district
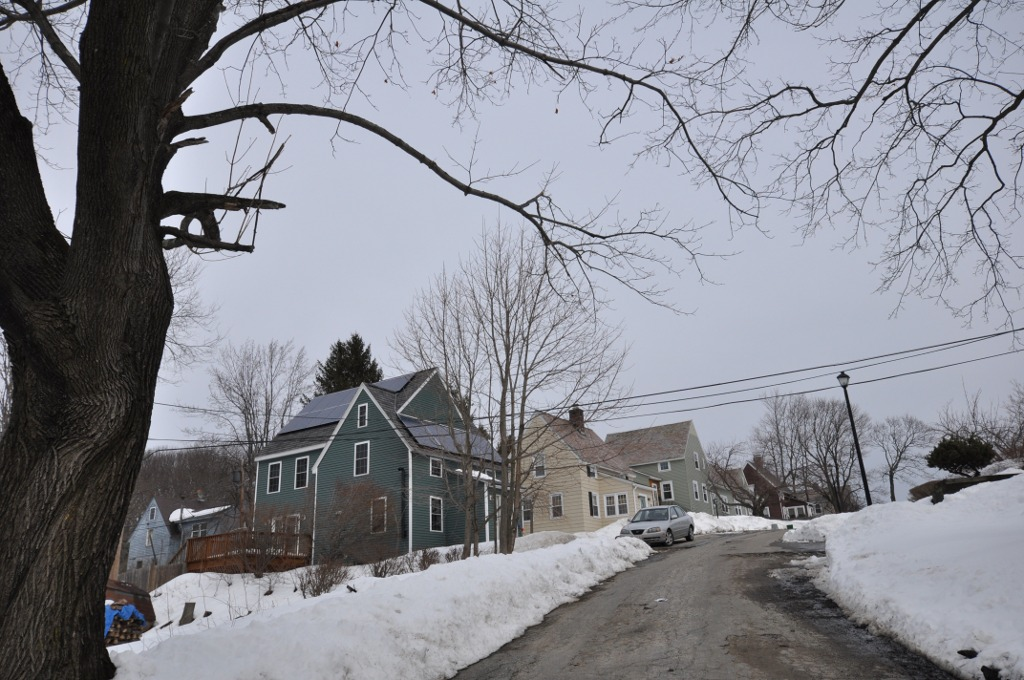
- Houses on Watt Road

- Location within Massachusetts Location within the United States
- Location: properties along Ararat St., Delaval, Heroult, Marconi, Watt Rds., and Westinghouse Pkwy., Worcester, Massachusetts
- Coordinates: 42°18′47″N 71°48′45″W
- Built: 1915
- Architectural style: Modern Movement
- MPS: Worcester MRA
- NRHP reference No.: 80000510
- Added to NRHP: March 05, 1980

Indian Hill-North Village is a residential historic district encompassing the largest planned worker housing community in Worcester, Massachusetts. Located in the suburban northern part of the city, it was developed in the 1910s by the Norton Company, then the city's largest employer. The district was listed on the National Register of Historic Places in 1980.

== Description and history ==
The North Village of Indian Hill is located in northern Worcester, just west of Interstate 190 and south of Ararat Street. It includes houses located on a roughly rectangular grid of streets bounded by Ararat Street, Delaval Road, Heroult Street, and Marconi Road. Roughly bisecting the area are Watt Road and Westinghouse Parkway; the latter is a divided road with a tree-lined median.

The company-designed houses in this area fall into two broad categories. The first type, which are the most common, are 1-1/2 story wood frame structures, with steeply pitched slate-covered gable roofs, a three-bay facade with center entrance, and a porch sheltering the entrance. The second type, of which only two examples exist on Watt Road at Westinghouse Parkway, are type 1 cottages with a single-story ell projecting from the rear. The district also includes four ahistorical ranch houses on Heroult Road dating to the 1960s. There are two originally non-residential buildings in the district: the former community hall at 24-26 Watt Road, and the community store at 8-10 Watt Road.

The village was created as a model planned company town for its workers by the Norton Grinding Company in 1915. Its design is attributed to Grosvenor Atterbury, who designed the South Village (since compromised by the construction of I-190), and the home of Aldus Higgins, then president of the Norton Company. The company established the Indian Hill Company as a worker real estate subsidiary in 1914, when the South Village was developed. The exact construction dates of the North Village complex is not known, but it probably took place with great rapidity during World War I, when there was an acute housing shortage. Unlike the South Village, whose properties were immediately sold (at cost) to company employees, the company retained ownership of most of the North Village until the 1920s. The complex is unique in Worcester, whose other major employers have no history of similar developments.

== See also ==
- National Register of Historic Places listings in northwestern Worcester, Massachusetts
- National Register of Historic Places listings in Worcester County, Massachusetts
