= Frederick Daniels House =

Historic house in Massachusetts, United States

- U.S. National Register of Historic Places
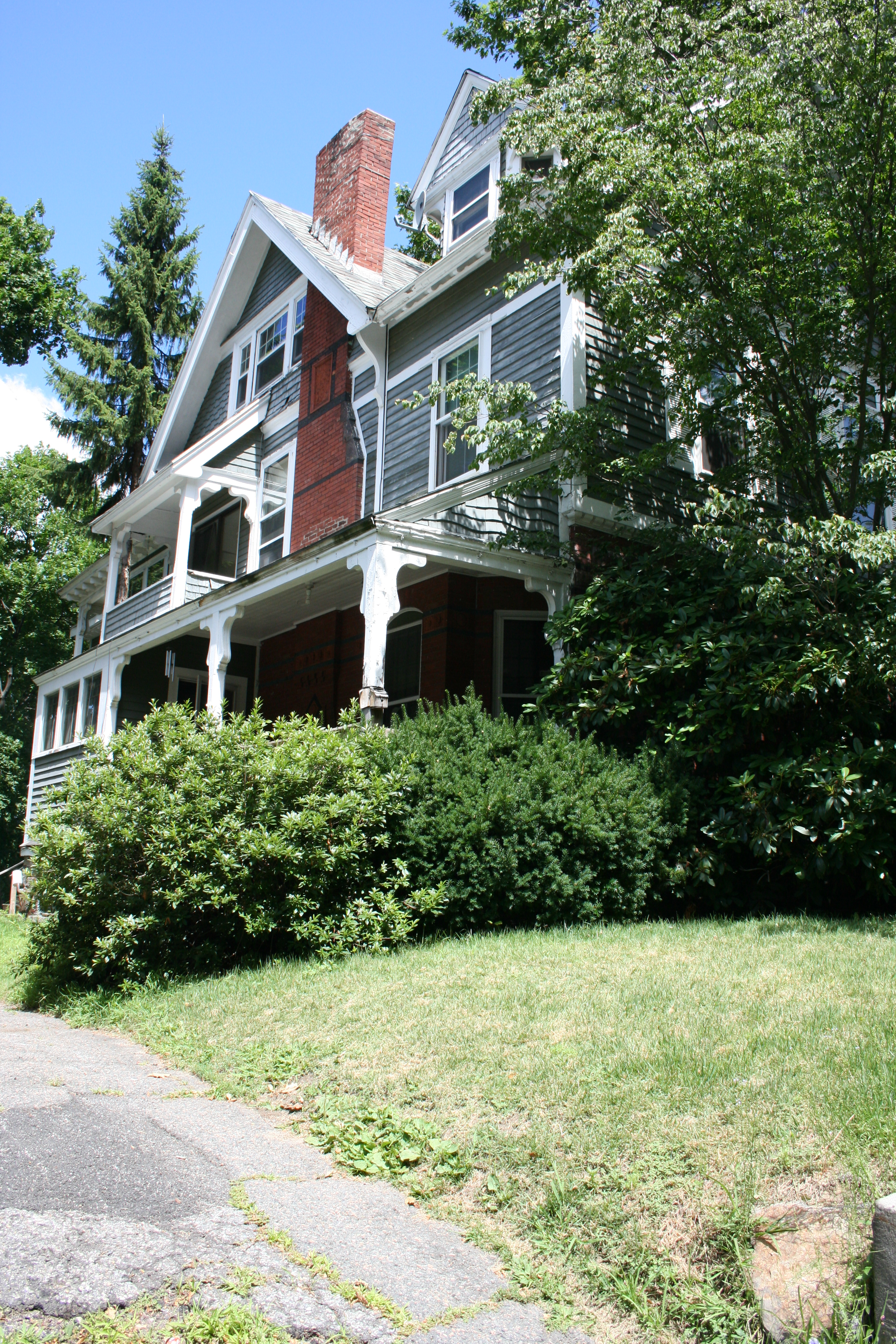

- Location within Massachusetts Location within the United States
- Location: 148 Lincoln St., Worcester, Massachusetts
- Coordinates: 42°16′43″N 71°47′39″W
- Area: less than one acre
- Built: 1885
- Architectural style: Queen Anne
- MPS: Worcester MRA
- NRHP reference No.: 80000526
- Added to NRHP: March 05, 1980

The Frederick Daniels House is a historic house at 148 Lincoln Street in Worcester, Massachusetts. Built about 1885, it is a well-preserved example of Queen Anne Victorian architecture, home to Frederick H. Daniels before he became president of Washburn and Moen, a leading Worcester industrial firm. It was listed on the National Register of Historic Places in 1980.

== Description and history ==
The Frederick Daniels House is located northeast of downtown Worcester, in the city's Brittan Square neighborhood. It is on the left side of Lincoln Street (Massachusetts Route 70), just south of Perkins Street. It is a 2 1/2-story structure, with a brick first floor and wood-frame upper levels, covered by a complex gabled roof. The ground floor is trimmed with terra cotta panels and sandstone, with windows set in segmented-arch openings, while the upper floors are finished in a combination of clapboards and decorative shingles. It has porches on the first and second floors, with decorative posts that have jigsawn brackets at the top. The entry porch, set on the left side of the house, has a starburst motif in a gable above its main stairs; a second starburst is found above the street-facing first-floor window.

The house was built about 1885. Its first owner, Frederick Daniels, was at that time a supervisor at the Washburn and Moen Wire Company who had worked his way up from humble beginnings. He later rose to become company president, and was a director of U.S. Steel and a local bank.

== See also ==
- National Register of Historic Places listings in eastern Worcester, Massachusetts
