= John Jeppson =

American industrialist (1844–1920)

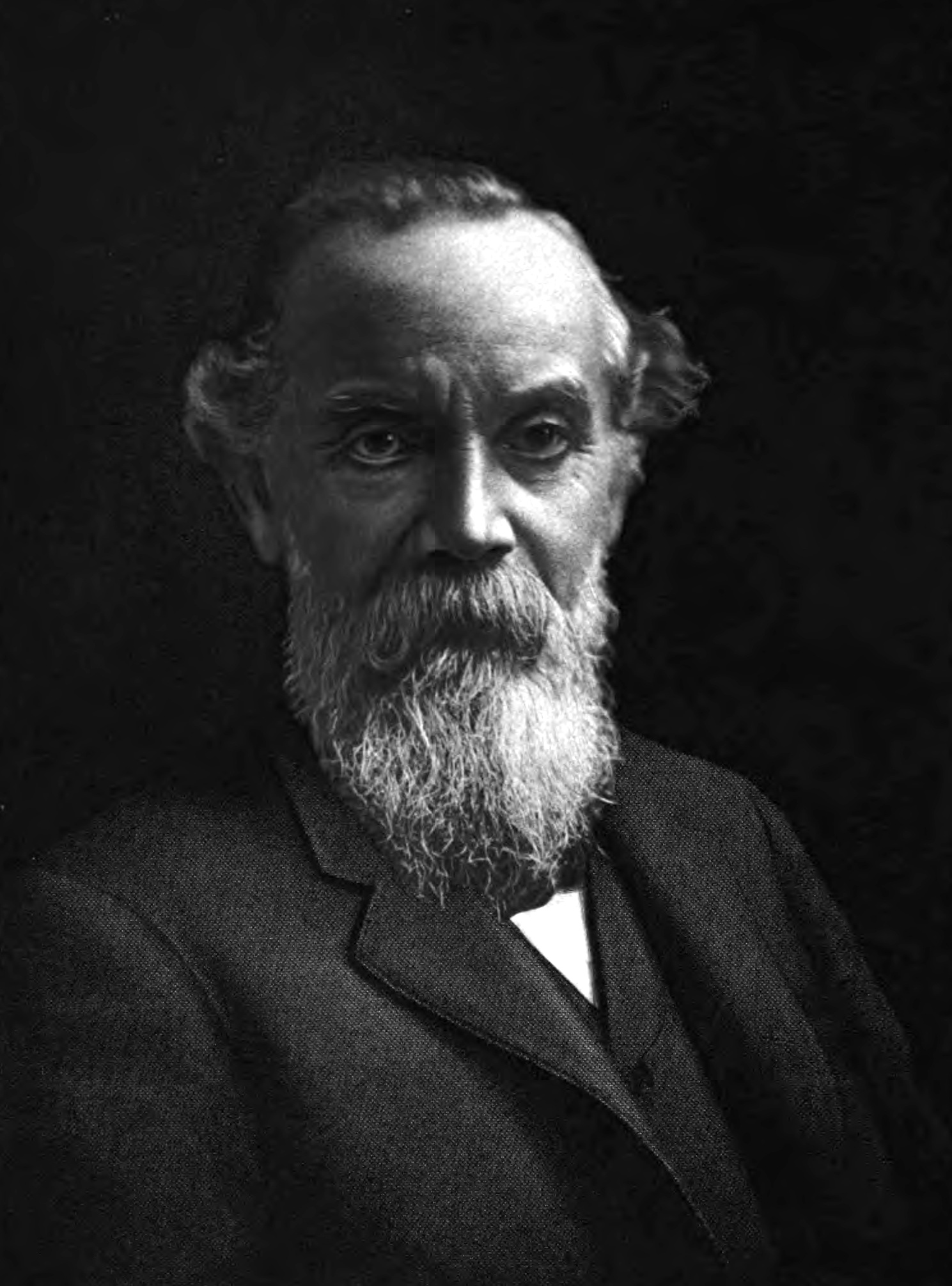
- Born: July 1, 1844; Höganäs, Sweden
- Died: March 26, 1920 (aged 75); Havana, Cuba

John Jeppson (July 1, 1844 – March 26, 1920) was an American industrialist. Jeppson was a founder and Chief Engineer of the Norton Emery Wheel Company (now Norton Abrasives) of Worcester, Massachusetts.

== Life ==
Jeppson was born on July 1, 1844, in Höganäs, Sweden. Jeppson’s father was a carpenter and several of his ancestors were mechanics. Jeppson went to school in his birthplace, but at the age of 12 went to work in a pottery and brick factory. At the age of 16 Jeppson learned how to manufacture architectural ornaments. He worked in the pottery and brick factory until the age of 24.

In 1868, around the age of 25, he decided to try his luck to America. When he arrived in America he gained employment with Norton in Worcester, MA, which at this time only produced pottery. Jeppson became very skilled at his profession and earned the highest salaries. In 1873 Jeppson managed to produce an artificial emery grinding stone. He continued his experiments and in 1885 the Norton Emery Wheel Company was created with Jeppson as one of the founders. Jeppson became the company’s first plant manager. Jeppson then went on to become the Chief Engineer of the Norton Emery Wheel Company. He maintained this position until his death.

At the time of Jeppson’s death in 1920, Norton Company had twelve employees and two ovens. After subsequent expansion, the company operated multiple ovens and a complex consisting of some 50 buildings in Worcester. The company also opened up factories in Canada, France and Germany. In 1990 Norton Abrasives was purchased by Compagnie de Saint-Gobain, a French -based multinational corporation.

== Personal life ==
In 1916, Jeppson became a Knight First Class of the Royal Order of Vasa as appointed by the King of Sweden. John Jeppson died during 1920 and was buried in the Old Swedish Cemetery at Worcester, Massachusetts.

John Jeppson married Thilda Ahlstrom (1847-1925). Their son George Nathaniel Jeppson (1873–1962) and grandson John Jeppson II (1916-2013) would continue the family legacy at Norton, both serving as president and CEO.

== John Jeppson Award ==
The John Jeppson Award which originated in 1958 is one of the most prestigious awards given by the American Ceramic Society. The award recognizes distinguished scientific, technical, or engineering achievements in ceramics.

== Other sources ==
- Charles W. Cheape (1985) Family firm to modern multinational: Norton Company, a New England enterprise "Harvard Studies in Business History. Volume 36" (Harvard University Press) ISBN 978-0-674-29261-1
- John F. McClymer and Charles W. Estus Sr. (1994) Ga till Amerika : The Swedish Creation of an Ethnic Identity for Worcester, Massachusetts (Worcester Historical Museum) ISBN 9781884292002
- Eric J. Salomonsson (2015) Swedish Heritage of Greater Worcester (The History Press) ISBN 9781467119429
