= Frederick H. Daniels =

American engineer and corporate director

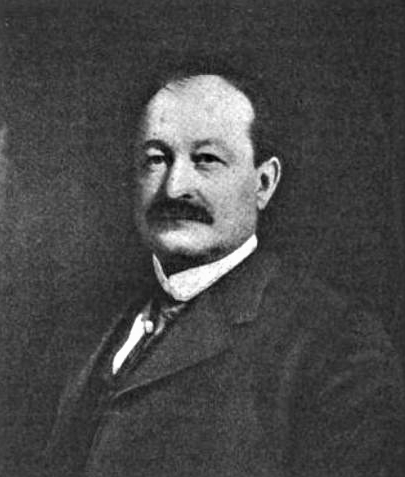
- Born: June 16, 1853; Hanover Center, New Hampshire, U.S.
- Died: August 31, 1913 (aged 60); Worcester, Massachusetts, U.S.
- Education: Worcester Polytechnic Institute
- Occupation: Engineer
- Spouse: Sarah L. White (m. 1883)

Fred Harris Daniels (June 16, 1853 – August 31, 1913) was an American engineer and corporate director.

== Life ==
Daniels was born in Hanover Center, New Hampshire on June 16, 1853, the son of William Pomerory Daniels, a lumber merchant and contractor. He came to Worcester at the age of one year. In 1873 he graduated from Worcester Polytechnic Institute and was employed by Washburn and Moen Company. Around 1875-1876 they sent him to Philadelphia to study steel-making, hoping to improve their steel quality. Daniels traveled extensively in Europe in 1877, studying steel production; soon after returning he went to Germany for additional study.

He married Sarah L. White in 1883, and they had three children.

After holding various jobs at Washburn and Moen, Daniels became general superintendent in 1888. Daniels had 151 patents relating to steel furnaces and rolling mills. He was awarded a gold medal at the Paris Exposition of 1900. King Gustaf of Sweden made him Knight of the Royal Order of the North Star.

Daniels was director of the US Steel Company and the US Envelope Company, president of Washburn and Moen (1907-1913), director of the Norton Company, Norton Grinding Company and the Mechanics National Bank of Worcester.

He died at his home in Worcester, Massachusetts on August 31, 1913.

In 1949, Daniels' three sons formed The Fred Harris Daniels Foundation, a private grant-making foundation focusing on Worcester County in Massachusetts, in memory of their father.

== See also ==
- Frederick Daniels House
