= George I. Alden =

American engineer (1843–1926)

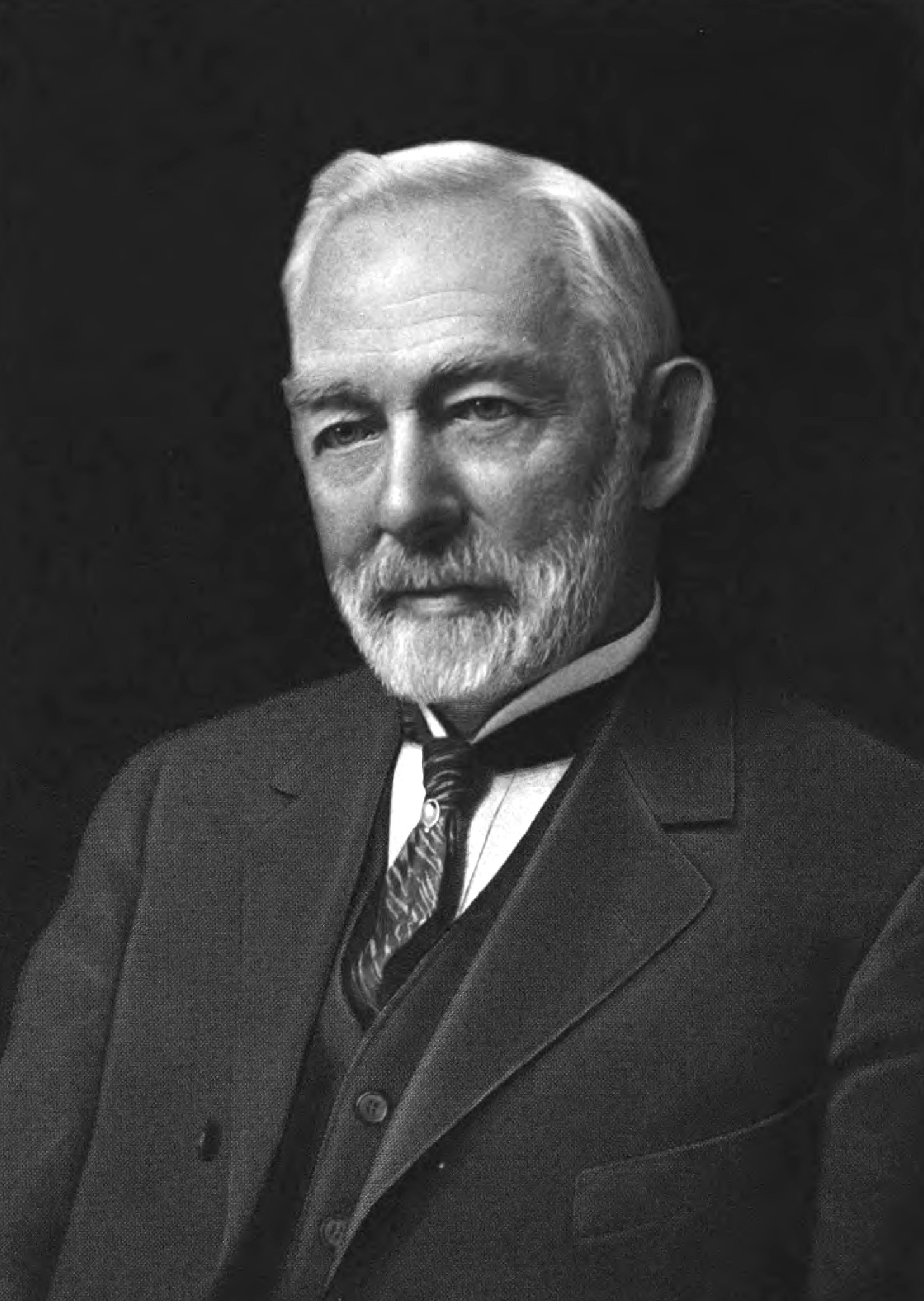
- Born: George Ira Alden; April 22, 1843; Templeton, Massachusetts, United States
- Died: September 13, 1926 (aged 83); Princeton, Massachusetts, United States
- Education: Lawrence Scientific School

George Ira Alden (22 April 1843 – 13 September 1926) was a mechanical engineer and academic innovator.

Alden was raised in Templeton, Massachusetts and educated at Harvard's Lawrence Scientific School and taught mechanical engineering for twenty-eight years at Worcester Polytechnic Institute where he gained national recognition for his teaching style that combined practice with theory. In 1885 he co-founded the Norton Emery Wheel Company in Worcester, Massachusetts. He also invented a dynamometer for measuring the power of various machines and the first hydraulic elevator. He was a trustee of the Worcester Polytechnic Institute and a trustee of the Worcester Boys' Trade High School. He was a member of the American Society of Mechanical Engineers from its founding in 1880 and its Vice-President from 1891-3. He made donations to establish and expand a hydraulic laboratory at Worcester Polytechnic Institute.

Alden established the George I. Alden Trust on August 24, 1912 for the general purpose of "the maintenance of some charitable or philanthropic enterprises" with particular interest in "the promotion of education in schools, colleges, or other educational institutions," as well as a particular interest in Worcester Polytechnic Institute, Worcester Technical High School, and Massachusetts YMCAs.

== Bibliography ==
- Alden, Geo. I. (1914). "Operation of grinding wheels in machine grinding". Transactions of the American Society of Mechanical Engineers. 36. American Society of Mechanical Engineers: 451–460. doi:10.1115/1.4059851.
