= Norton Abrasives =

American abrasives manufacturer and supplier

Coordinates: 42°18′22″N 71°48′12″W

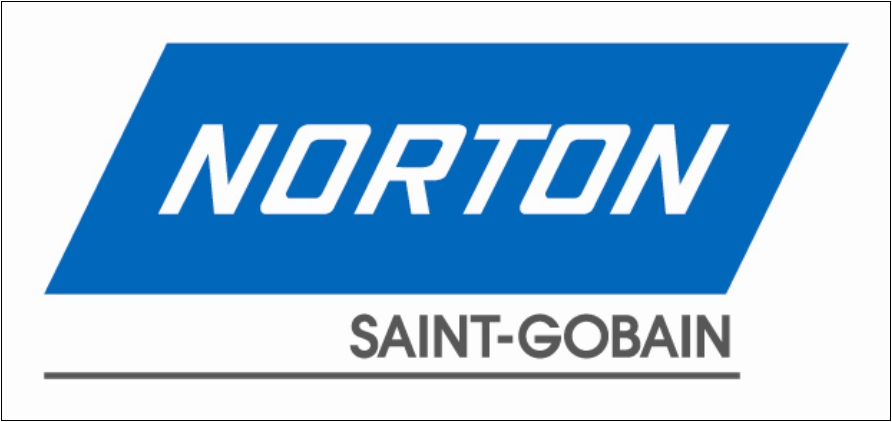

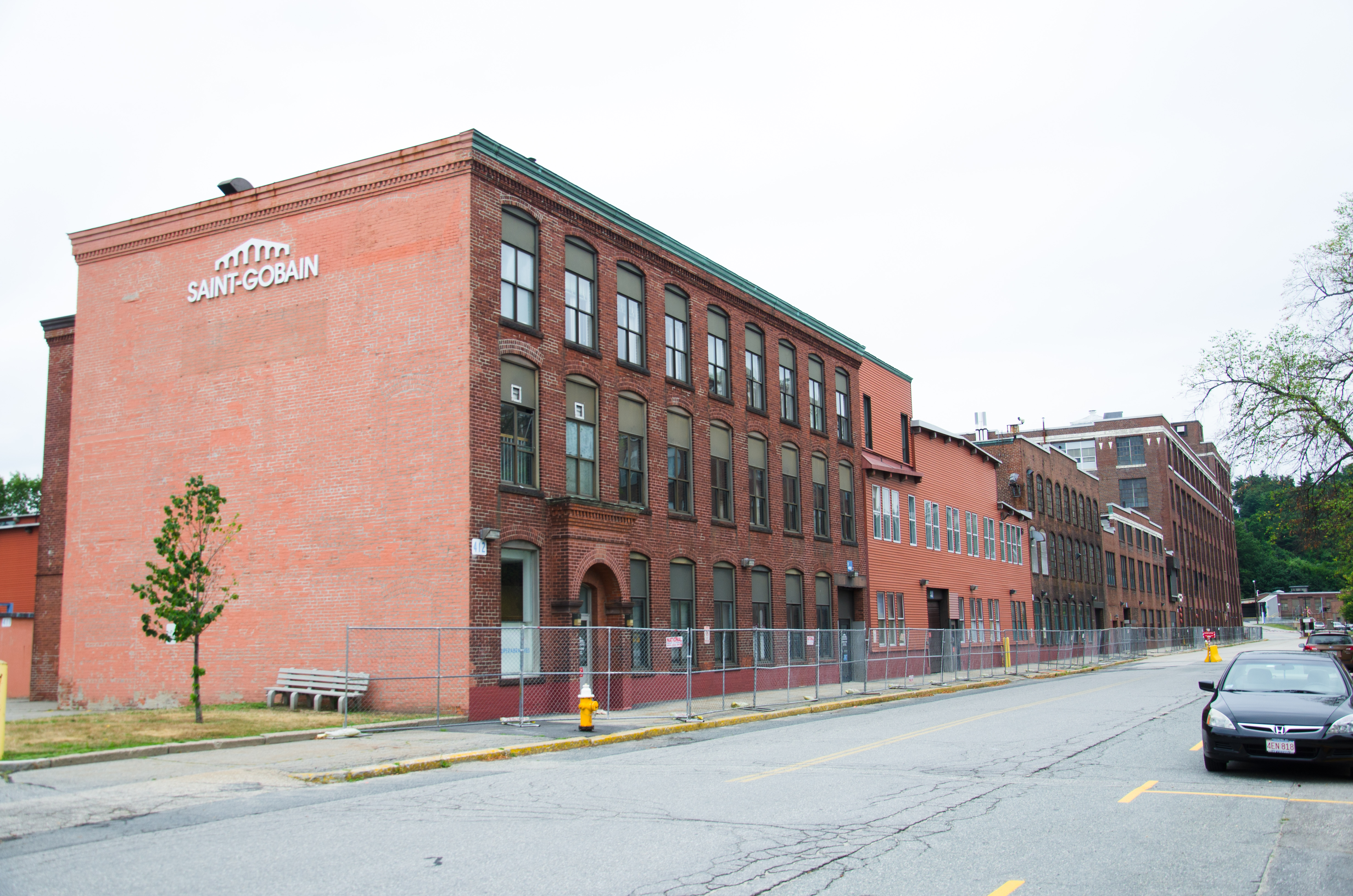
- Part of the Saint-Gobain complex on the former Norton Company site in Worcester, Massachusetts
- Type: Abrasives Manufacturing Company
- Industry: Abrasives
- Founded: 1858
- Headquarters: Worcester, Massachusetts, United States
- Products: Bonded Abrasives, Coated Abrasives, Non-Woven Abrasive Products, Superabrasives, Non-Abrasive Products
- Parent: Saint-Gobain

Norton Abrasives of Worcester, Massachusetts, United States, is a manufacturer and supplier of abrasives for commercial applications, household, and automotive refinishing usage.

Norton Company was founded in 1885 by a group of ceramists and entrepreneurs from Worcester, Massachusetts.

In 1990 it was purchased by Saint-Gobain of France. Norton specializes in the manufacture of abrasive products for applications in the autobody, construction, welding/industry, and marine/composite markets as well as for contractors and DIY consumers.

== Origins and history ==
The roots of the Norton Company begin with in a pottery shop in Worcester, opened in 1858 by Franklin Norton and his older cousin Frederick Hancock. The shop specialized in redware and stoneware pottery. In 1873, an employee of the shop, Sven Pulson, invented a grinding wheel made by mixing clay with emery and water. As the need for grinding wheels was expanding, Frank Norton patented Pulson's invention and began manufacturing it. By 1885, Frank Norton's discouraging health and Frederick Hancock's lack of interest in the new product resulted in the need to sell the wheel manufacturing business.

Pulson left the pottery shop in 1880, replaced by his brother-in-law John Jeppson. When Frank Norton's business came on the market, he was quick to purchase it. Partnering with co-workers, Walter Messer and Charles Allen; Worcester Polytechnic Institute professors, Milton Prince Higgins and George I. Alden; and Washburn & Moen employees Fred Harris Daniels and Horace A. Young.

The partners built a new factory on the outskirts of the city, in the Greendale neighborhood which still exists. During the late 1890s, corporate decision-making proved conservative until it was assured the company would succeed. Until that time, dividends were frequently forgone and many of the owners declined to draw a salary.

The company introduced a series of pamphlets and related literature, which detailed the intricacies of each wheel and advised users on benefits for desired applications. By the mid-1890s, Norton stocked the largest inventory of grinding wheels in the world, subsequently beginning distribution in Chicago (1887), New York City (1904), and soon after, across Europe.

Norton's 1900 expansion into the machine tools industry contributed to its growth. Through partnership with Charles H. Norton, the company founded the Norton Grinding Company division. The company specialized in the production of stationary grinding machines, an alternative to expensive workmen, which were capable of producing high volume, working with extremely heavy materials, and grinding with a high tolerance. Initially, with minimal product need, Norton's Grinding division saw little success, but the American industrial needs of World War I and the American automobile industry boom began a period of explosive growth. In 1904, Norton employee Aldus Higgins invented a water-cooled furnace, which contributed to the company's success at the time.

In 1914, Henry Ford's purchase of thirty-five Norton Grinders prompted Ford to remark that "the abrasive processes are basically responsible for our ability to produce cars to sell for less than a thousand dollars. Were it not for these processes these same cars would cost at least five thousand dollars, if indeed they could be made at all." With 95 percent of an automobile's moving parts requiring grinding, the automotive industry soon became Norton's biggest customer. With a resistance to grinding innovation, Norton gradually lost most of its industry market share by the mid-1950s.

In 1962, Norton became a publicly held company.

Since 2009, Norton has been a sponsor and abrasive supplier for both the United States Men's and Women's Olympic luge teams. Both teams competed under Norton sponsorship in the 2010 Vancouver Winter Games.

Norton also contributed in the design and building of grinding machines for mass production.

== Gallery ==
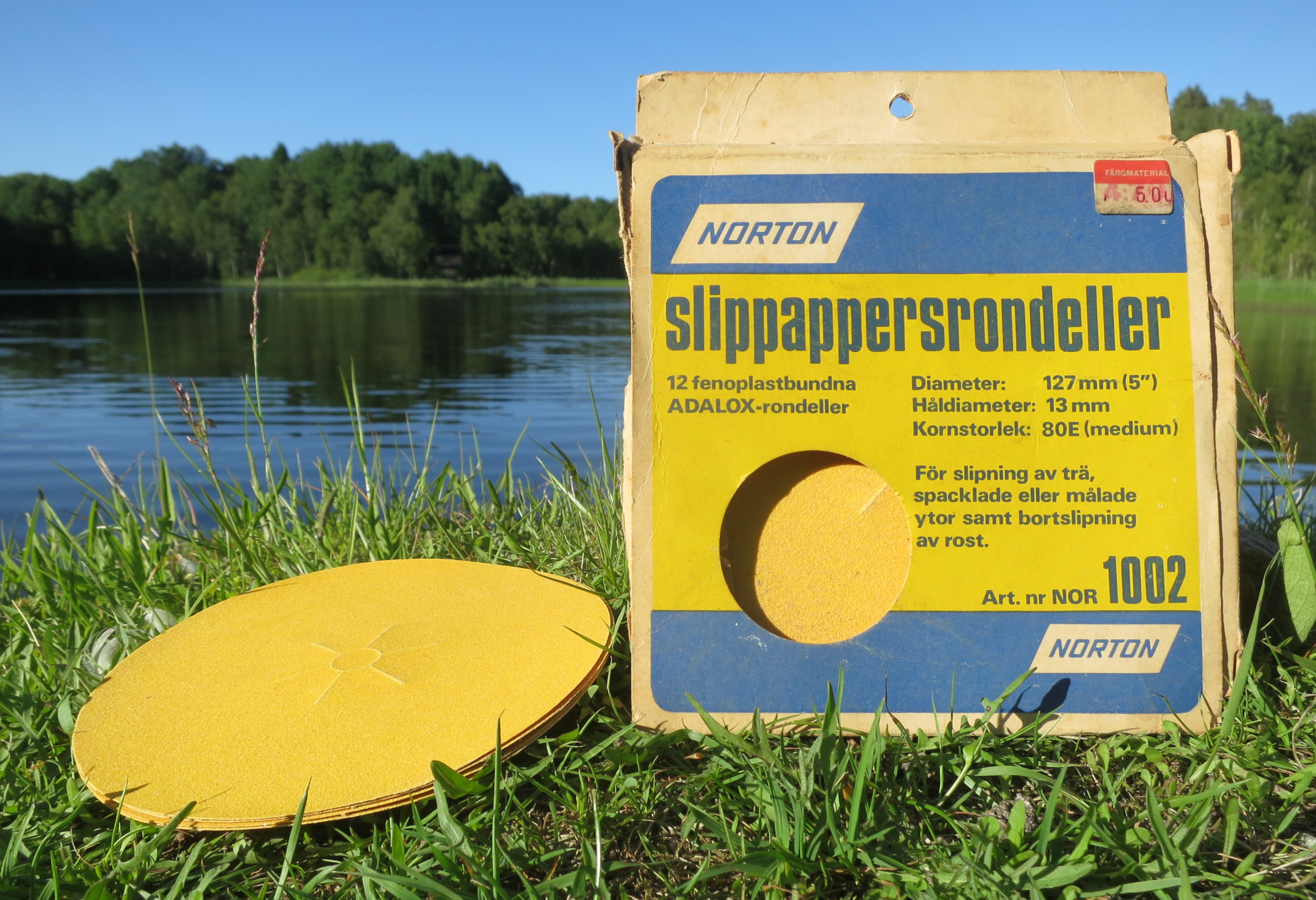
1960s Norton Abrasives sanding discs for the Swedish market.

== See also ==
- Indian Hill-North Village

== Bibliography ==
- Rolt, L. T. C. (1965), A Short History of Machine Tools, Cambridge, Massachusetts, USA: MIT Press, OCLC 250074. Co-edition published as Rolt, L. T. C. (1965), Tools for the Job: a Short History of Machine Tools, London: B. T. Batsford, LCCN 65080822.
- Cheape, Charles (1985). Family Firm To Modern Multinational Norton Company a New England Enterprise, Cambridge, Massachusetts, US: Harvard University Press, LCCN 84010824.
