= Higgins Armory Museum =

Higgins Armory Museum collection
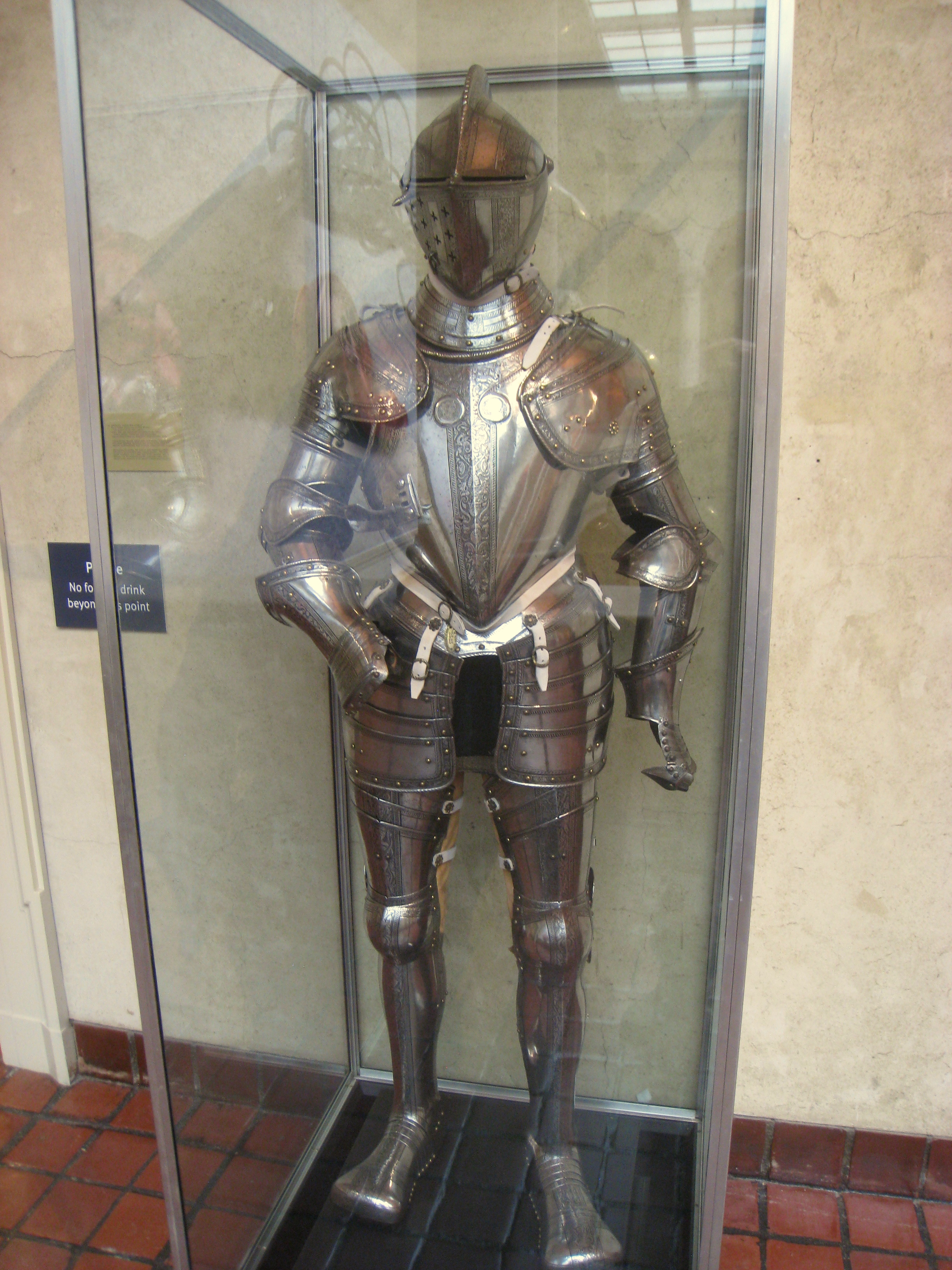
- Complete Armor for Combat, North Italian, last quarter of 16th century
- Established: January 12, 1931
- Location: Worcester Art Museum, Worcester, Massachusetts, United States
- Type: arms and armor museum
- Key holdings: 24 full suits of armor
- Collection size: 2,000 objects
- Higgins Armory Museum
- U.S. National Register of Historic Places
- Location within Massachusetts
- Location: 100 Barber Ave., Worcester, Massachusetts
- Coordinates: 42°17′50″N 71°47′57″W
- Area: less than one acre
- Built: 1931
- Architects: Leland,Joseph D.
- Architectural style: International Style
- MPS: Worcester MRA
- NRHP reference No.: 80000514
- Added to NRHP: March 5, 1980

The Higgins Armory Museum is a collection in the Worcester Art Museum. It was formerly a separate museum located in the nearby Higgins Armory Building in Worcester, Massachusetts, dedicated to the display of arms and armor. It was "the only museum in the country devoted solely to arms and armor" and had the second largest arms and armor collection in the country from its founding in 1931 until 2004, behind the Metropolitan Museum of Art in New York City. The collection consists of 2,000 objects, including 24 full suits of armor. The museum closed at the end of 2013 due to a lack of funding. Its collection and endowment were transferred and integrated into the Worcester Art Museum, with the collection on show in its own gallery. The former museum building was sold in December 2014 and now serves as a local events venue.

== History ==
John Woodman Higgins was a prominent industrialist in Worcester, Massachusetts who owned the Worcester Pressed Steel Company. He traveled to Europe multiple times throughout the 1920s where he collected arms, armor, and other steel items. One of his most important purchases was eight full suits of armor from the collection of George Jay Gould in 1927. Originally, he stored these items in his house, which quickly filled with anything that he could find made of steel, from suits of armor to automatic shoe polishers. Higgins incorporated his collection as a museum in 1928; the collection grew larger than his house could hold, so he began construction on a steel and glass museum building next to his factory in 1929.

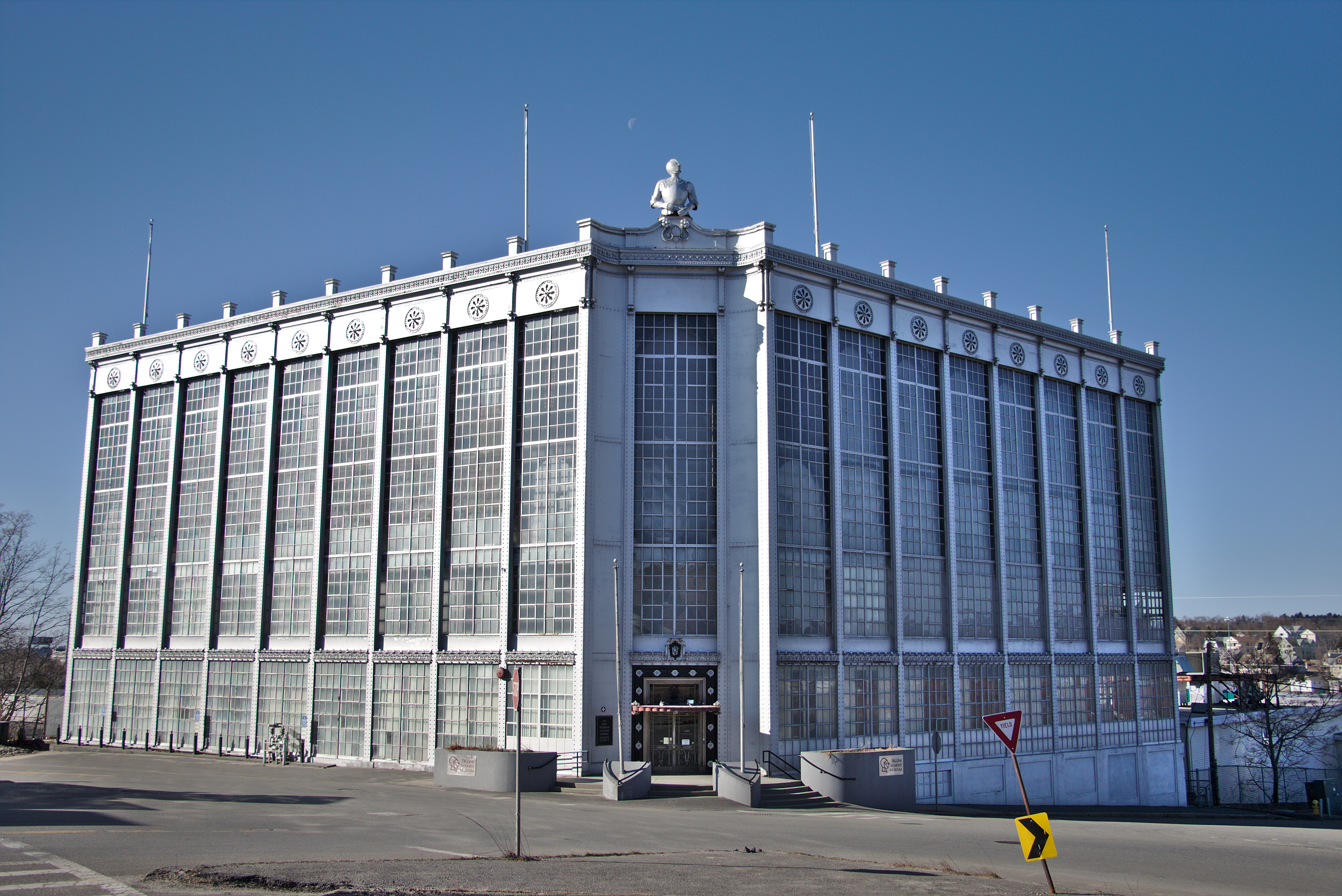
The original building that housed the collection shortly after it closed

"The Museum of Steel and Glass" opened on January 12, 1931 with a grand gala. Music was played by members of the Boston Symphony Orchestra and Higgins' sons dressed in suits of armor. In its original layout, the museum displayed a wide variety of objects constructed of steel including "medieval weaponry, automobile parts, and even ... an all-steel airplane suspended from its ceiling." Admission to the museum began with a walk through the armor exhibits and ended with a tour through the production lines to see modern steel manufacturing. The production floor was accessed through catwalks connecting the factory and the armory. Higgins invited visitors to the museum across these catwalks, and he also invited his workers to visit the museum on breaks to get inspired. Higgins died in 1961, leaving the museum a US$17,000 endowment.

== Collection in Worcester Art Museum ==
The collection today is spread throughout the museum by time period, uniting period armor with artworks depicting armor, such as paintings and sculpture. Each first Saturday of the month demonstrations of armor in various fighting styles from the collection are given, to enable visitors to better place the artifacts in historic context. The museum continues the collection's educational programs on medieval history and arms and armor, ranging from school workshops and teacher education to scholarly lectures. The Olive Higgins Prouty Research Library, founded in 1997 with an initial collection of "several thousand books on arms and armor" also remains in the collection.

The Higgins Armory was a major center of study for Western martial arts. Scholars associated with the museum such as curator Jeffrey Forgeng, William Short, and Ken Mondschein produced monographs and translations, gave papers and sponsored sessions at scholarly conferences, and lectured and demonstrated both in the US and Europe. The Higgins Armory Sword Guild was a study group founded in part by Patri J. Pugliese that conducted research into Western martial arts and demonstrated at the museum and in the community. The former museum also held historical fencing and martial arts classes.

The collection consists of 2,000 objects, making it the second largest arms and armor collection in the country behind the Metropolitan Museum of Art in New York City. The collection includes 24 full suits of armor, a gladiator helmet, and "Helmutt," a dog mannequin dressed in reproduction boarhound armor. The oldest object in the collection is an Eastern Mediterranean dagger from between 3000 and 1500 B.C.

The collection includes gladiator and Corinthian helmets, gauntlets from the Renaissance period, and the helmet of a 19th-century French cuirassier. There are also pieces that depict the courtly life: helmets for jousting tournaments, a crossbow for hunting, a ceremonial gorget, and an anvil that was used to manufacture such pieces.

There are knives and axes from Africa, bow case covers from ancient Islam, a horned kulah khud (helmet) from India, and samurai armor from Japan, among others. The collection also includes examples of armor for dogs and horses. There are also full-scale models of jousts and foot tourneys.

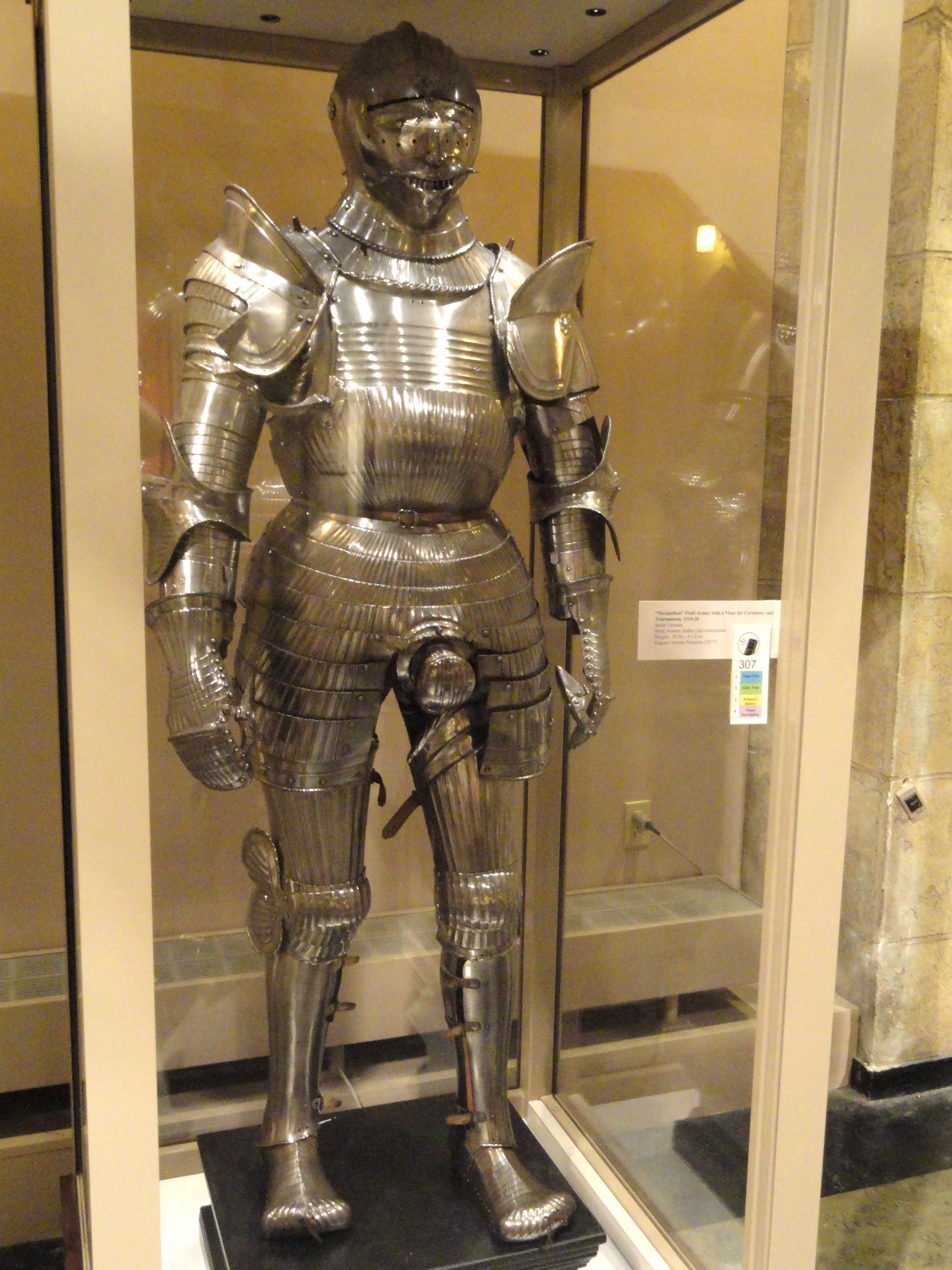
Maximilian field armor with visor for ceremony and tournament, south Germany, 1510–1520

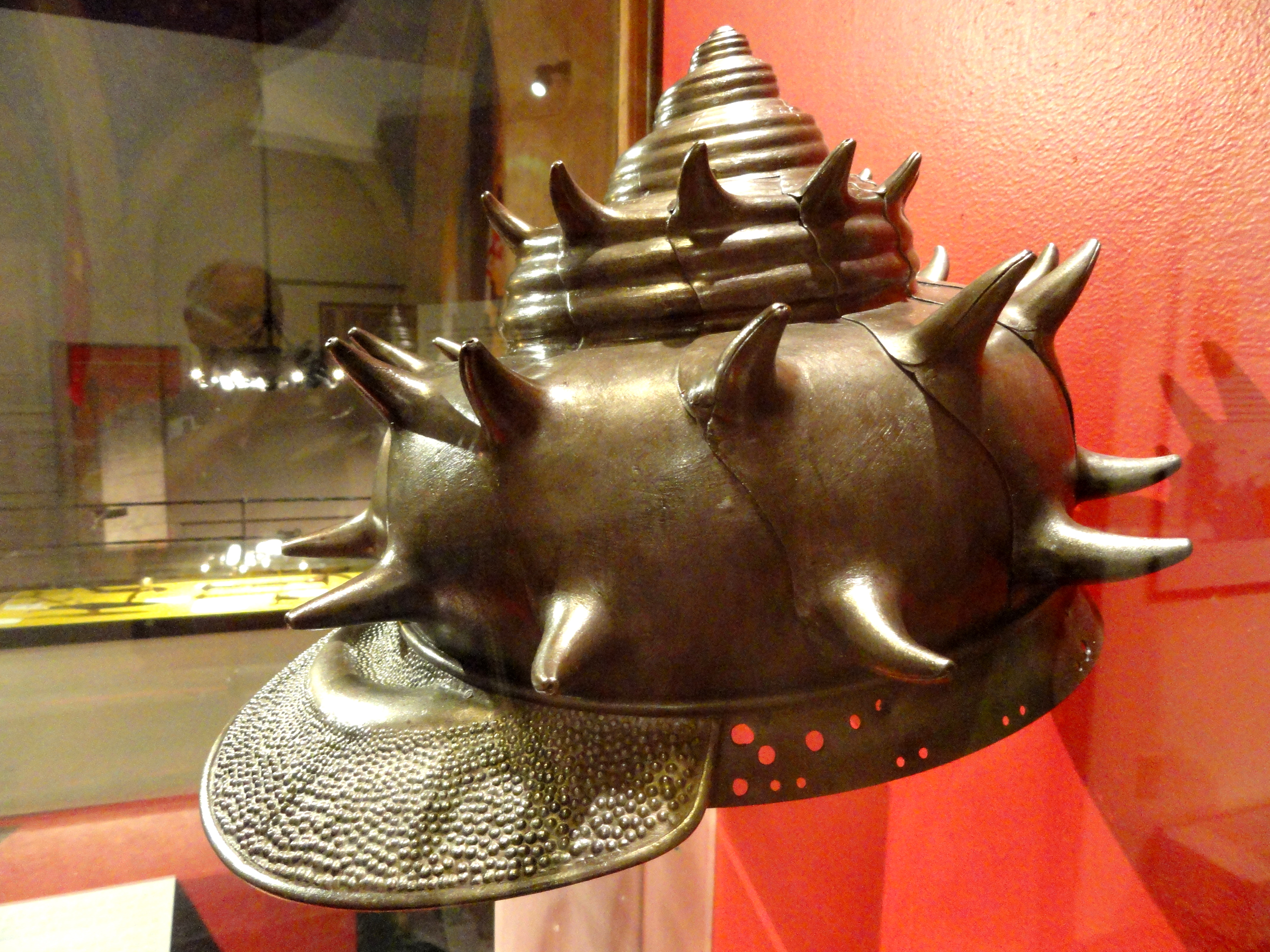
Helmet embossed in the form of a conch shell (awabi uchidashi kabuto), Japan, 1618. Made by Nagasone Tojiro Mitsumasa; signed "Echizen no kuni ju Mitsumasa; Nagasone Tojiro saku"

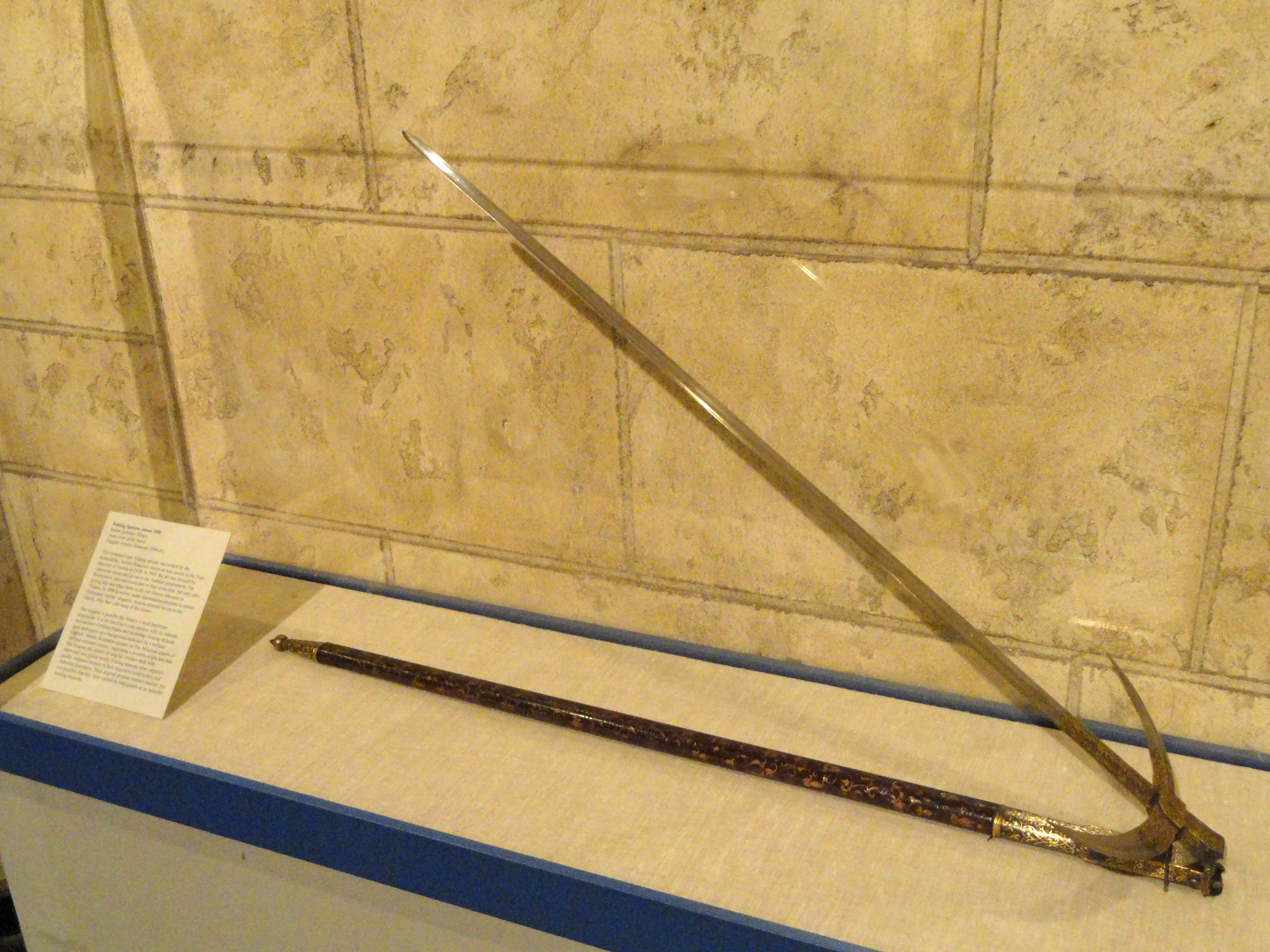
Folding spetum, Italy, c. 1550; once owned by the Rothschild family.

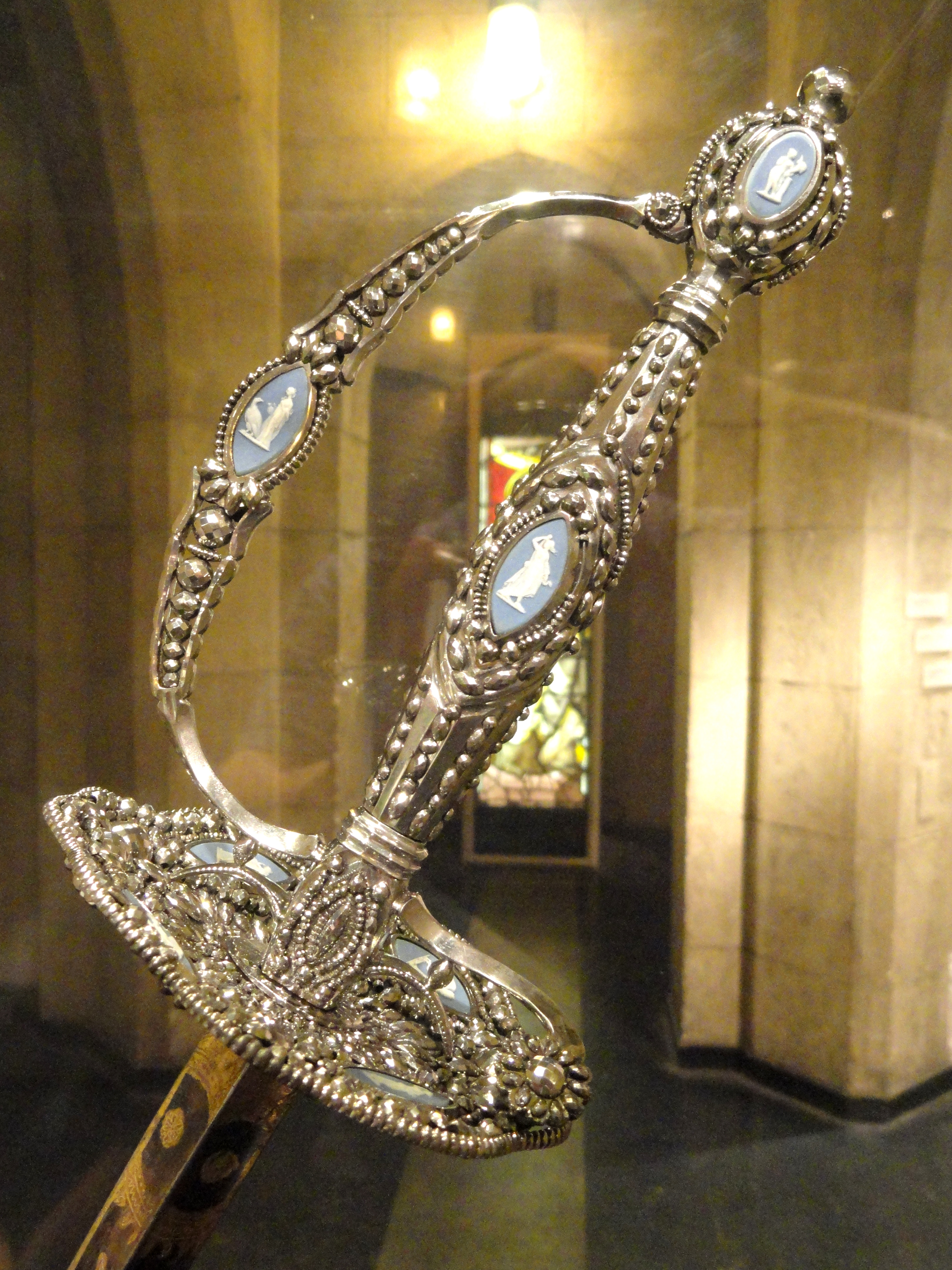
Smallsword c. 1790 by Josiah Wedgwood and perhaps Matthew Boulton

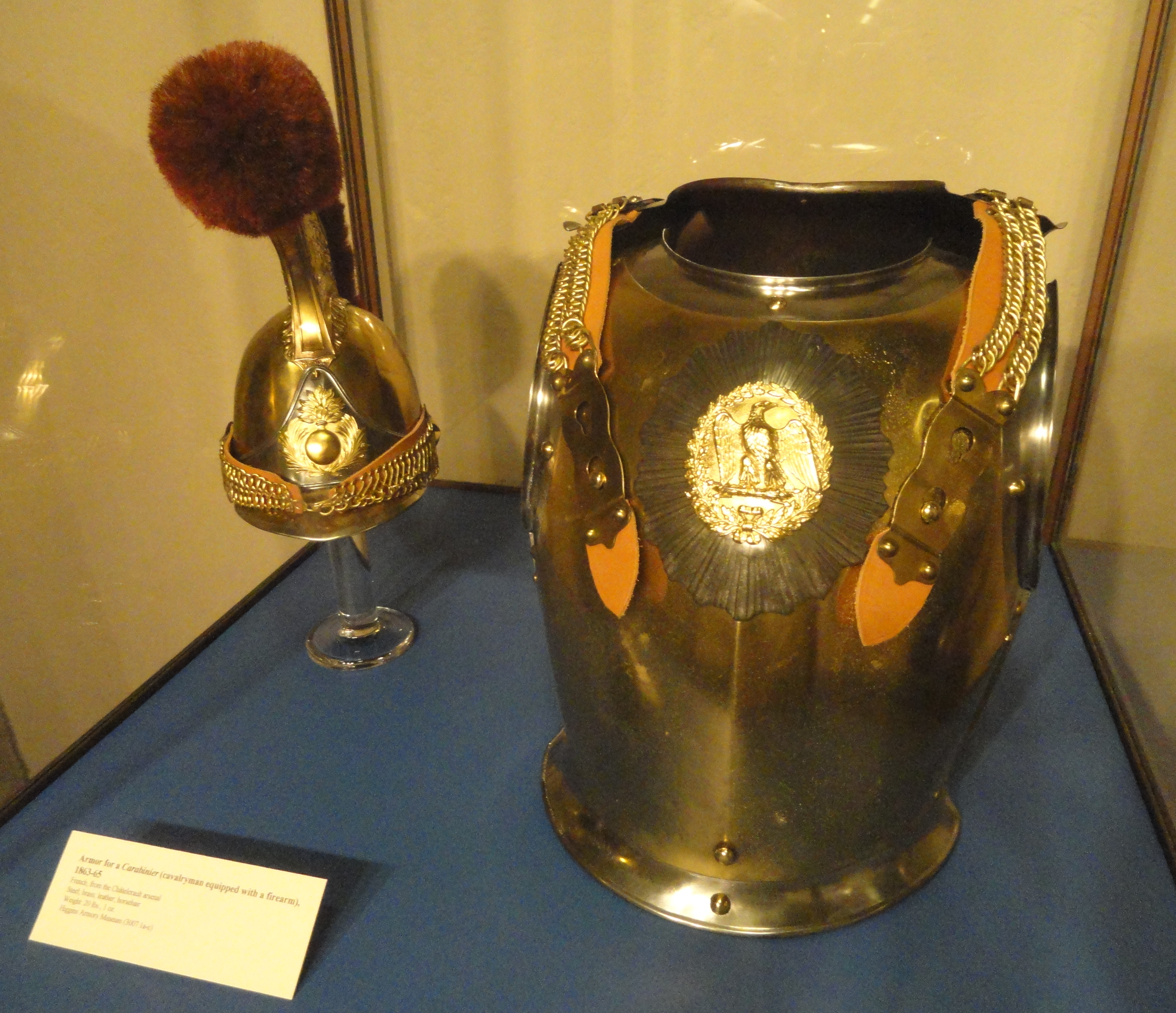
Carabinier armor, France, 1863–1865

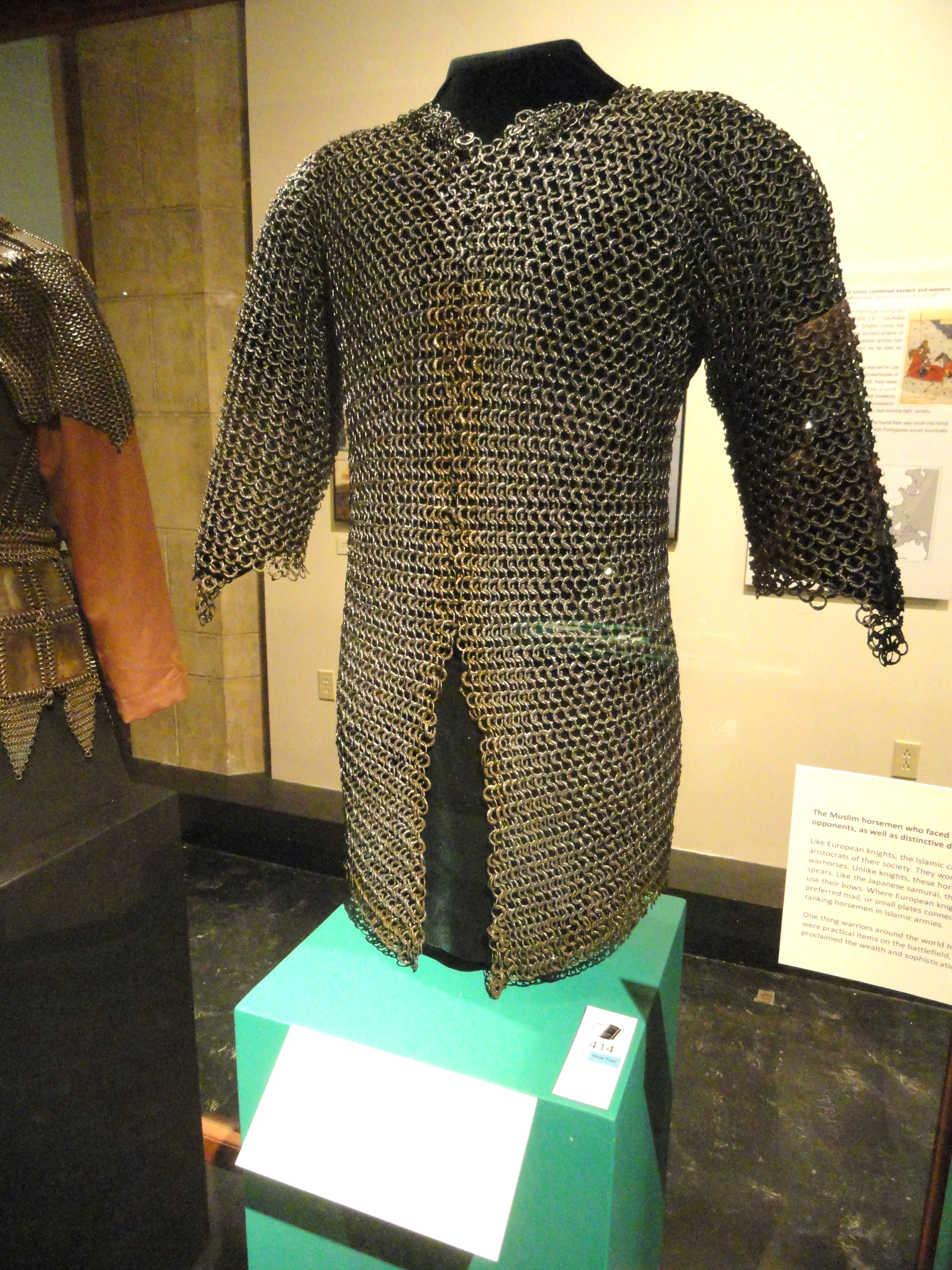
Mail coat, probably Ottoman Turkey, perhaps 1550–1650; the word "Allah" is embossed on each link

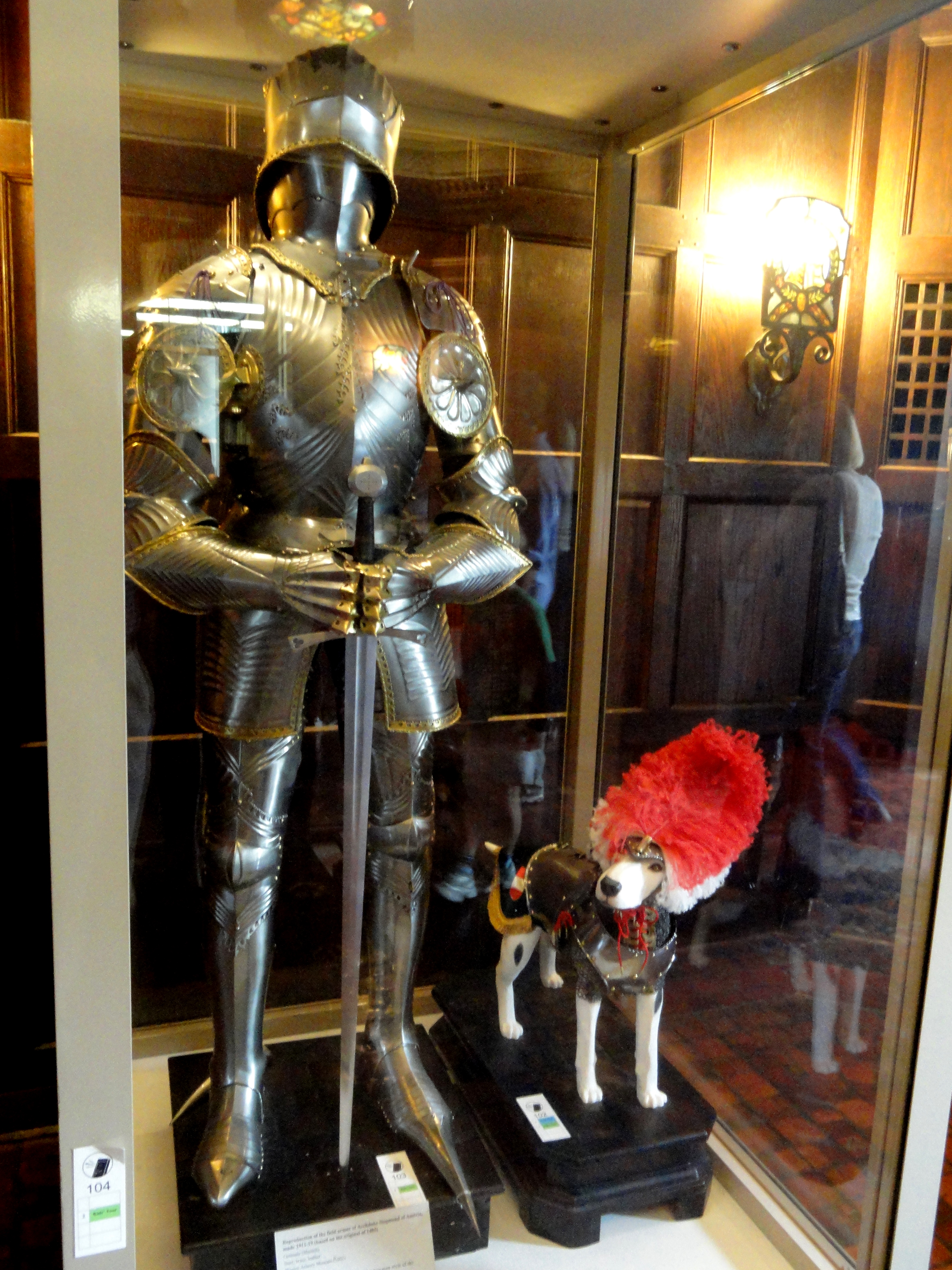
Reproduction field armor of Archduke Siegmund of Austria 1485 (reproduction 1911–19) with armor for boar hound, German style 16th century, reproduction US 1942. The dog is Higgin's mascot "Helmutt"

== In popular media ==
Norman Rockwell drew an imagined scene in the Higgins Armory Museum entitled Midnight Snack for the November 3, 1962 cover of The Saturday Evening Post.

The Higgins Armory Museum has been featured on the History Channel on multiple occasions, including a special DVD extra that focused solely on the museum.

In April 2011, the TV show Ghost Hunters filmed an episode at the museum to see if the ghost of Mr. Higgins haunted the building.
