= John Woodman Higgins =

American steel magnate (1874–1961)

John Woodman Higgins (September 1, 1874 – October 19, 1961) was an American businessman and owner of the Higgins Armory Museum.

== Early & personal life ==
John Woodman Higgins was born to Milton Prince Higgins (December 7, 1842 - March 8, 1912) and Katharine Elizabeth (Chapin) Higgins. (December 11, 1847 - January 9, 1925) Except for one year in Atlanta, John Higgins was schooled in Worcester. He was poor in spelling and languages but shared his father's natural talent and interest in mathematics and mechanics. He also possessed a fascination with metalworking and spent many hours observing blacksmiths, farmers and factory workers at work. Like many of his contemporaries, he was also enchanted by the chivalric tales of knights, a common literary theme at the time. After graduating from Worcester Polytechnic Institute he joined the Plunger Elevator Company with his father. When the company was sold, the two men purchased the Worcester Ferrule and Manufacturing Company, * reorganizing it in 1905 as Worcester Pressed Steel Company. When his father died in 1912, John Higgins became president and treasurer, positions he held until 1949 when his oldest son took over. He was elected president of the Worcester Economic Club in 1935.

Higgins traveled many times to Europe. He had purchased some copies of armor but in 1928 he purchased a group of armors from Sir Joseph Duveen. This was his first truly significant acquisition and was followed by several equally important purchases during the next decade. He now realized he needed somewhere to house his collection. In 1928 he started work on a building next to the Worcester Pressed Steel Company. It was finished in 1931 at a cost of $300,000. It became the Higgins Armory Museum, which was the largest museum in the United States solely devoted to armor. The armor collection is now part of the Worcester Art Museum.

Higgins was married to Clara Louise Carter (July 2, 1882 – March 2, 1972) and they had three children: Carter Chapin Higgins; Bradley Carter Higgins and Mary Louise Carter Higgins. Clara Louise was born in Saint Louis County, Missouri, and died in Worcester County, Massachusetts. She is buried in Rural Cemetery in Worcester, Massachusetts.

Carter Chapin (Oct. 15, 1914 - July 30, 1964) succeeded John Woodman Higgins as president of Worcester Pressed Steel in 1949 and served as president until his death. Bradley Carter Higgins (Nov. 20, 1916 - April 2, 1981) worked at Worcester Pressed Steel and later founded and was president of ElectroSteam Corp. Mary Louise (May 8, 1919 – December 18, 2007) later served as President for her fathers armory for a number of years. After her brother's death she served briefly as president and chairman of Worcester Pressed Steel. She is buried in Rural Cemetery. (Worcester, Massachusetts).

== Death ==
Higgins died on October 19, 1961, and is buried in Rural Cemetery next to his wife. (Worcester, Massachusetts)
