= Boulder (disambiguation) =

A boulder is a large rock.

Boulder may also refer to:

== Places ==
=== Australia ===
- Boulder, Western Australia
  - Electoral district of Boulder

=== Canada ===
- Boulder Island, Nunavut, Canada

=== United States ===
- Boulder, Colorado
- Boulder, Illinois, an unincorporated community in Clinton County, Illinois
- Boulder, Montana
- Boulder, Utah
- Boulder, West Virginia, an unincorporated community in Barbour County, West Virginia
- Boulder, Wyoming
- Boulder City, Nevada
- Boulder Creek, California
- Boulder Junction, Wisconsin, a town
- Boulder Junction (CDP), Wisconsin, an unincorporated community
- Boulder Dam, a.k.a. Hoover Dam

== Education ==
=== United States ===
- Boulder, University of Colorado Boulder
- Boulder, Boulder High School

== Other uses ==
- Boulder, large toy marble subject to distinct rules
- Boulder, a.k.a. Nix, a satellite of Pluto
- Boulders (album), a 1973 album by Roy Wood
- Boulder, a fictional truck in the racing video game Excite Truck
- Boulder, a character from Transformers: Rescue Bots
- Boulder Amplifiers, an American high-end audio manufacturer
- Terry Boulder, early stage name for American professional wrestler Hulk Hogan
- Horace Boulder, former American professional wrestler
- Boulder (band), an American rock band
- Boulder (novel), a 2020 novel by Eva Baltasar
- Hyundai Boulder, a concept vehicle by Hyundai Motor Company
- Boulder Electric Vehicle, a defunct electric commercial vehicle manufacturer

== See also ==
- Bouldering, sport
- Boulder River (disambiguation)
- The Boulders (disambiguation)
- Bould (surname)
- Bolder
