= Bould (surname) =

Bould is a surname, and may refer to:

- Beckett Bould (1880–1970), British actor
- Bruce Bould (1949–2023), English actor
- Fred Bould (born 1964), American product designer
- George Bould (1887–1958), English footballer
- Sally Bould Stan (née Sally Waldner; 1917–2008), American architect in California
- Sophie Bould, British theatre and TV actress
- Steve Bould (born 1962), English footballer and coach

== See also ==
- Bold (surname)
- Boult (surname)
- Bolder
- Boulder (disambiguation)
