= Worcester Polytechnic Institute =

Private university in Worcester, Massachusetts, US

- Former name: Worcester County Free Institute of Industrial Science (1865–1886)
- Motto: German: Lehr und Kunst
- Motto in English: "Theory and Practice"
- Type: Private research university
- Established: 1865; 161 years ago
- Accreditation: NECHE
- Academic affiliations: NAICU; HECCMA; AITU; Space-grant
- Endowment: $733.9 million (2025)
- President: Grace Wang
- Provost: Andrew Sears
- Faculty: 478
- Students: 7,388 (fall 2025)
- Undergraduates: 5,461 (fall 2025)
- Postgraduates: 1,927 (fall 2025)
- Location: Worcester, Massachusetts, United States; 42°16′28″N 71°48′27″W
- Campus: Midsize City, 80 acres (0.32 km^{2})
- Newspaper: Tech News
- Student gender distribution: 63/37 male/female (2022)
- Colors: Crimson; Gray
- Nickname: Engineers
- Sporting affiliations: NCAA Division III - NEWMAC; Liberty League; NEWA; ECAC; NEISA
- Mascot: Gompei the Goat
- Website: wpi.edu

The Worcester Polytechnic Institute (WPI) is a private research university in Worcester, Massachusetts, United States. Founded in 1865, WPI was one of the United States' first engineering and technology universities and now has 14 academic departments with over 50 bachelor's, master's, and Ph.D. degree programs. It is classified among "R1: Doctoral Universities – Very high research activity".

== History ==
John Boynton (left) and Ichabod Washburn (right)

Worcester Polytechnic Institute was founded by self-made tinware manufacturer, John Boynton, and Ichabod Washburn, owner of the world's largest wire mill. Boynton envisioned science schooling that would elevate the social position of the mechanic and manufacturer, but not necessarily teach the skills needed to become either. Washburn, on the other hand, wanted to teach technical skills through a sophisticated apprenticeship approach. Boynton consulted Seth Sweetser, a pastor, for ways to realize his vision. By chance it happened that Ichabod Washburn had previously consulted Sweetser about the proper way to actualize his own vision.

Sweetser drafted a letter expressing Boynton's and Washburn's wish, a "liberal proposal to found a Free School for Industrial Science" in Worcester and called for a meeting of supporters. After a first meeting the following notice appeared in the Worcester Palladium: "A Gentleman, who for the present withholds his name from the public, offers a fund of $100,000 for the establishment of a scientific school in Worcester, upon the condition that our citizens shall furnish the necessary land and buildings." Further funding and land grants for the university were given by Stephen Salisbury II, who was an influential merchant and later served as the first president of the institute's board of directors.

In response to this anonymous request, more than 225 Worcester citizens and the workers at 20 of the city's factories and machine shops contributed to the construction of the original building. On May 10, 1865, after House and Senate approval, the secretary of the commonwealth recorded the Institute as a legal corporation, and it came into formal existence.

Both Boynton and Washburn died before the opening of the college on November 11, 1868. On that day, Charles O. Thompson, the first president of the Institute, inaugurated the Worcester County Free Institute of Industrial Science. WPI was led in its early years by Thompson. WPI continuously expanded its campus and programs throughout the early twentieth century, eventually including graduate studies and a program in electrical engineering. During World War II, WPI offered defense engineering courses and was selected as one of the colleges to direct the V-12 Navy College Training Program.

During this time, WPI suffered from the lack of a unified library system, well-maintained buildings, and national recognition. This changed under the leadership of president Harry P. Storke from 1962 to 1969. Building on growth under Arthur Bronwell's presidency, Storke brought significant change to the school in what would be known as the WPI Plan. The Plan called for the creation of three projects and drastically redesigned the curriculum to address how a student learns. The Storke administration also launched a capital campaign that resulted in the creation of the George C. Gordon Library, added residence halls, an auditorium, and a modern chemistry building. Furthermore, women were first allowed to enter WPI in February 1968.

Through the six month period from July 2021 to January 2022, seven WPI undergraduate and graduate students lost their lives, making local and national news. Two of the deaths occurred prior to the school year. Five were confirmed or apparent suicides. Following the third death, which occurred in September 2021, WPI set up an emergency mental health task force, and requested an independent review by nearby Riverside Trauma Center. In 2022, following the task force's dissolution, WPI announced the creation of a new Center for Well-Being.

In 2025, the university was classified as a "Research 1: Very High Research Spending and Doctorate Production" university.

== Campus ==
WPI's campus occupies approximately 95 acres (38 ha) on and around Boynton Hill in Worcester, Massachusetts, with the main academic campus centered at 100 Institute Road. The campus is situated on a hill within the city, near cultural institutions including the Worcester Art Museum and American Antiquarian Society. Immediately north of the main campus is the 44.9-acre (18.2 ha) Institute Park, a municipal park that has historically been associated with WPI; Stephen Salisbury III donated the former farm and pasture to the city in 1887 to provide open space for students and Worcester residents.

Boynton Hall (left) and the Washburn Shops, WPI's two original buildings

The original campus developed on land donated by Worcester businessman Stephen Salisbury II, who also served as the first president of WPI's board of trustees. Its first two buildings, Boynton Hall and the Washburn Shops, were both constructed in 1868 and were intended to embody the institution's founding educational ideals; students studied scientific and engineering theory in Boynton and applied it through manufacturing work in Washburn. Their respective clock tower and arm-and-hammer weathervane became WPI's "Two Towers". Boynton Hall was designed by Worcester architects Stephen C. Earle and James E. Fuller, while the Washburn Shops were designed by Elbridge Boyden. Washburn is a Second Empire brick building with slate mansard roofs and remains in use for engineering education.

In 2017, WPI's trustees adopted a policy that new buildings be capable of receiving LEED certification. WPI lists the Bartlett Center, East Hall, Sports and Recreation Center, Faraday Hall, Innovation Studio and Messenger Hall, and Unity Hall among its LEED-certified buildings.

The university completed a new campus framework plan in 2024 with planning and architecture firm Ayers Saint Gross.

=== Main campus ===
The principal open space of the main campus is a quadrangle used for student recreation and major university events including commencement, homecoming, and alumni gatherings. The Centennial Walkway, a network of brick paths crossing the Quad, was installed in 1991 to commemorate the centennial of the WPI Alumni Association, and the landscape was renovated in 2013 to improve drainage, lighting, pedestrian circulation, and accessibility. Two bronze representations of Gompei the Goat, WPI's mascot, serve as campus landmarks. The "Proud Goat" overlooks the Quad, while the "Charging Goat" stands outside the Sports and Recreation Center.

Boynton Hall remains WPI's principal administration building and contains the offices of the president and provost, while the Washburn Shops and adjoining Stoddard Laboratories house engineering and materials-science facilities. Other academic buildings in the historic core include Salisbury Laboratories, Atwater Kent Laboratories, Stratton Hall, Olin Hall, Goddard Hall, Fuller Laboratories, Kaven Hall, and Higgins Laboratories. Salisbury Laboratories, which opened in 1889, enabled WPI to establish its first formal library space in Boynton Hall.

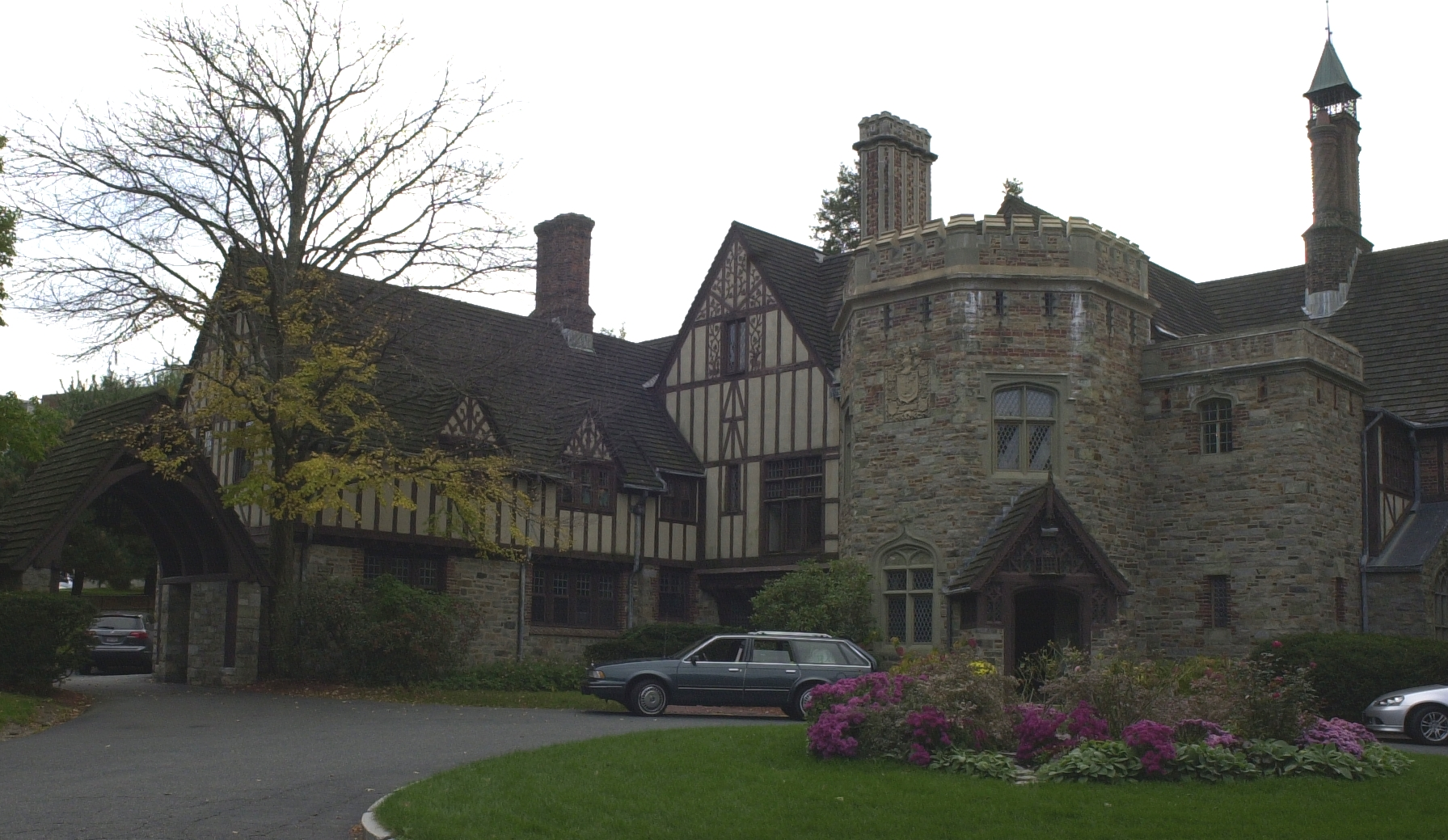
The Higgins House, a Tudor Revival mansion on the northern edge of campus

Alden Memorial, constructed in 1940 with funding from the George I. Alden Trust, was WPI's first auditorium and was renovated in 1992 as a performing-arts center containing performance, rehearsal, and music-education spaces. The nearby George C. Gordon Library opened in 1967. The Earle Campus Bridge, constructed for WPI's 75th anniversary, connects the vicinity of Boynton Hall with Alden Memorial.

On the northern edge of campus, the Higgins House is a Tudor Revival mansion commissioned by WPI alumnus Aldus Chapin Higgins and completed in 1923. The house was bequeathed to WPI in 1971 and is used for alumni functions, meetings, and university events; its grounds include formal gardens overlooking Institute Park. Designed by Grosvenor Atterbury, it was added to the National Register of Historic Places in 1980 for its architectural significance.

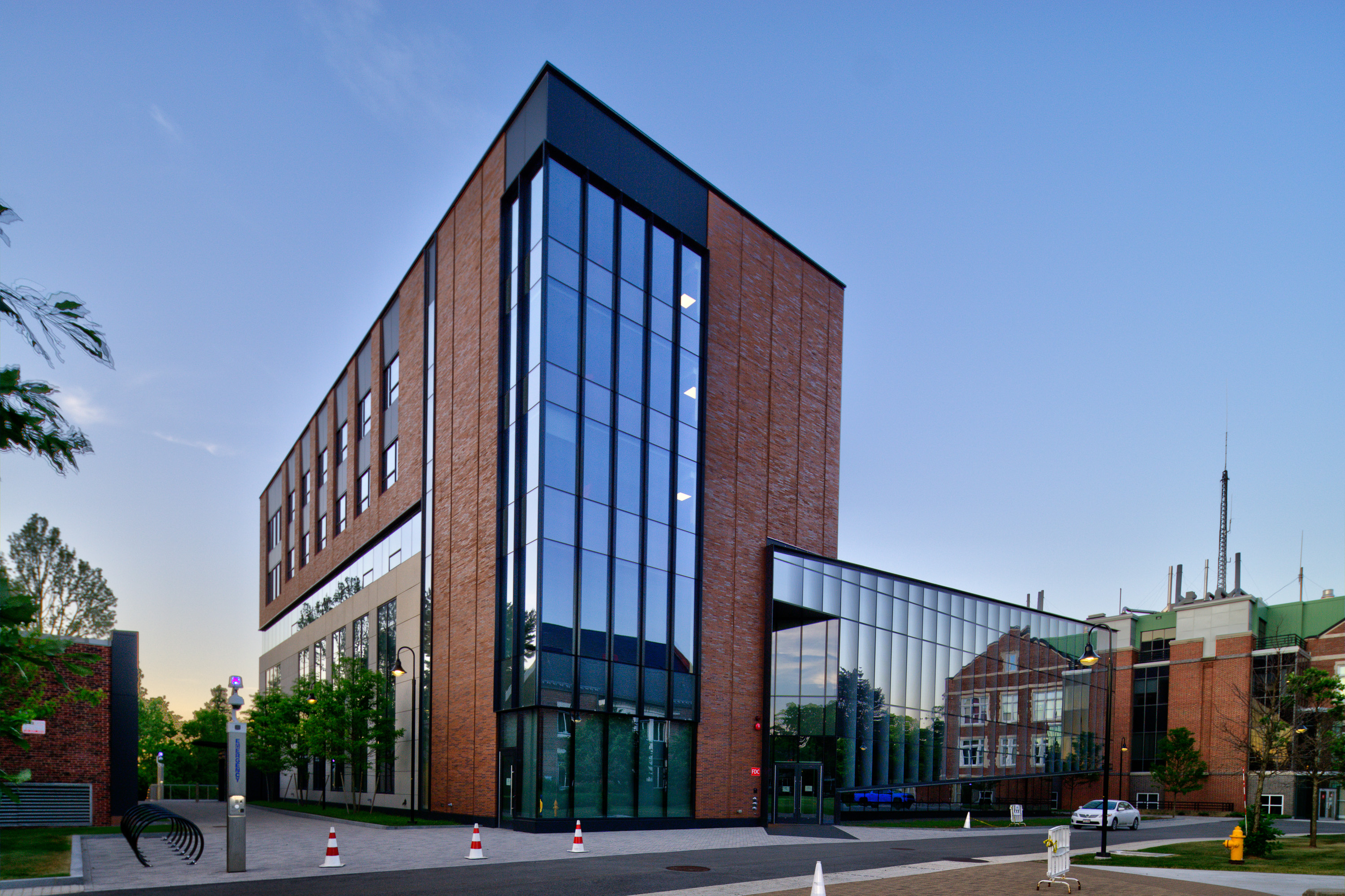
The Innovation Studio, opened with Messenger Hall in 2018

The Rubin Campus Center, opened in 2001, is a student center near the center of campus. The Innovation Studio and Messenger Hall complex opened in 2018. Unity Hall, a five-story academic and student-services building designed by Gensler, opened in 2022 on the eastern slope of Boynton Hill.

=== Residential and athletic facilities ===
WPI's undergraduate housing includes traditional residence halls, apartment-style buildings, townhouses, and smaller residential houses. Sanford Riley Hall, completed in 1927, was the first purpose-built residence hall on campus and houses the university's Little Theatre and Riley Commons. Other residence halls include Daniels, Founders, Institute, Messenger, Morgan, and the Stoddard Complex, while apartment-style housing includes Ellsworth and Fuller apartments, East Hall, Faraday Hall, and the WPI Townhouses.

East Hall is located on WPI's lower campus and accommodates approximately 230 upper-class students in apartments. Faraday Hall, near Grove and Lancaster streets, is an apartment-style residence accommodating approximately 260 upper-class students. WPI also operates the South Village residential area near the university's quad; established after the 2021 closure of neighboring Becker College, it consists of nine historic houses on William, Sever, Cedar, Fruit, Marston, Oak, and West streets that were converted to student residences in 2021 and 2022.

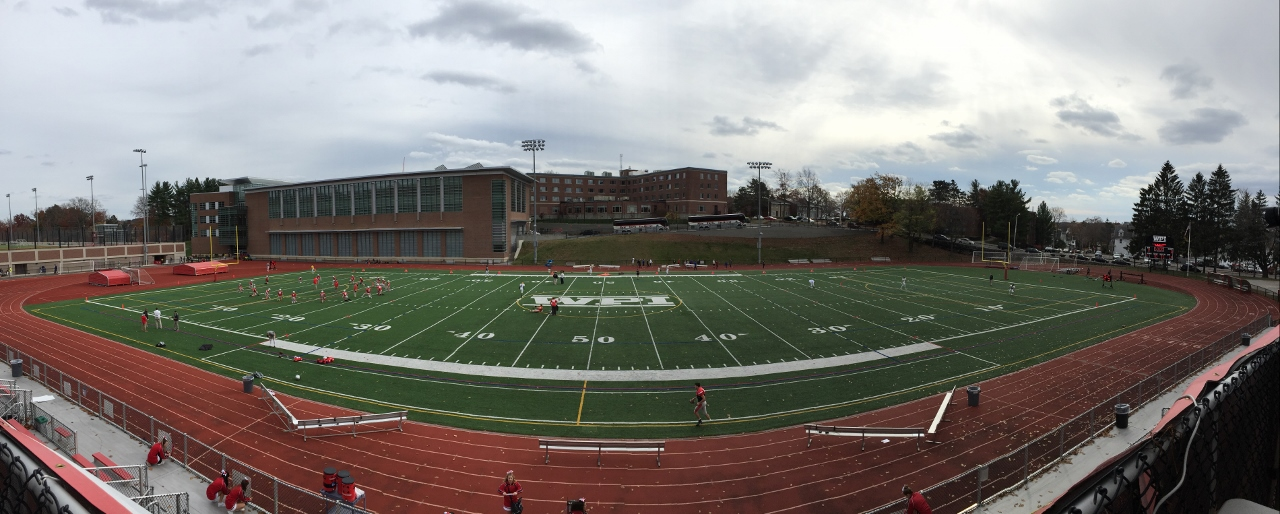
Alumni Stadium and H. Carr Field

The main indoor athletic facility is the Sports and Recreation Center, which opened in 2012 and contains a competition swimming pool, four-court gymnasium, indoor running track, rowing tanks, fitness facilities, and racquet courts. Adjacent Harrington Auditorium, constructed in 1968, contains a 3,000-seat arena used by WPI's basketball and volleyball teams and for university and community events. Outdoor facilities include H. Carr Field at Alumni Stadium and Norcross Track.

=== Other facilities ===
WPI's principal research complex outside the hilltop campus is Gateway Park, an 11-acre (4.5 ha) mixed-use research and development district created through a partnership between WPI and the Worcester Business Development Corporation on a former brownfield near downtown Worcester. Its first major university facility, the Life Sciences and Bioengineering Center, formally opened in 2007, and WPI added Gateway Park to its campus footprint in 2010. WPI facilities at 50, 60, and 85 Prescott Street house programs and laboratories in fields including robotics engineering, life sciences and bioengineering, biomanufacturing, fire protection engineering, and business.

WPI also maintains WPI Seaport, an academic and collaboration facility at 303 Congress Street in Boston's Seaport District.

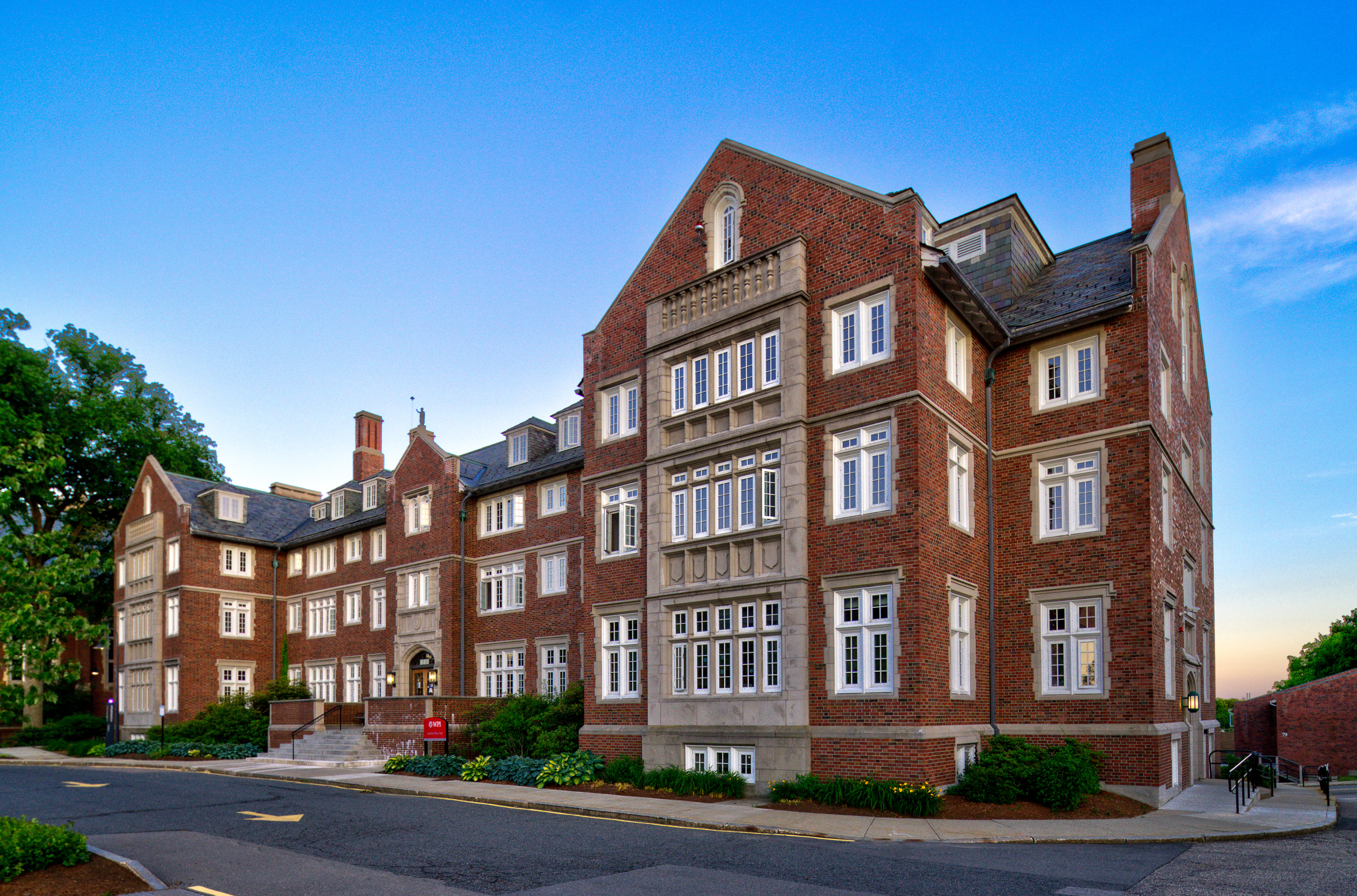
Sanford Riley Hall, the first residence hall built on campus (1927)

The Beech Tree stands over 100 feet (30 m) tall

Earle Bridge

Higgins House

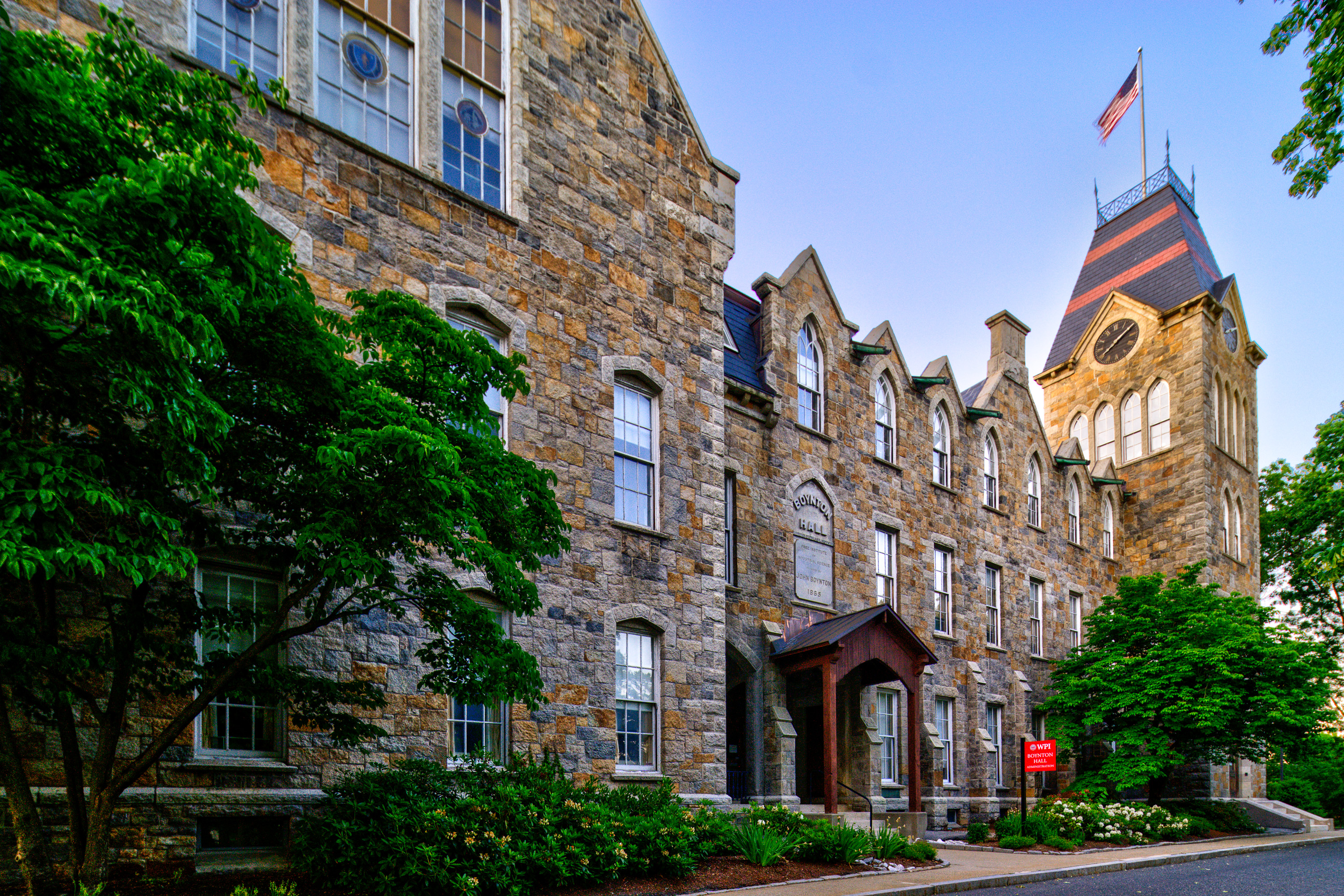
Boynton Hall, WPI's main administrative building

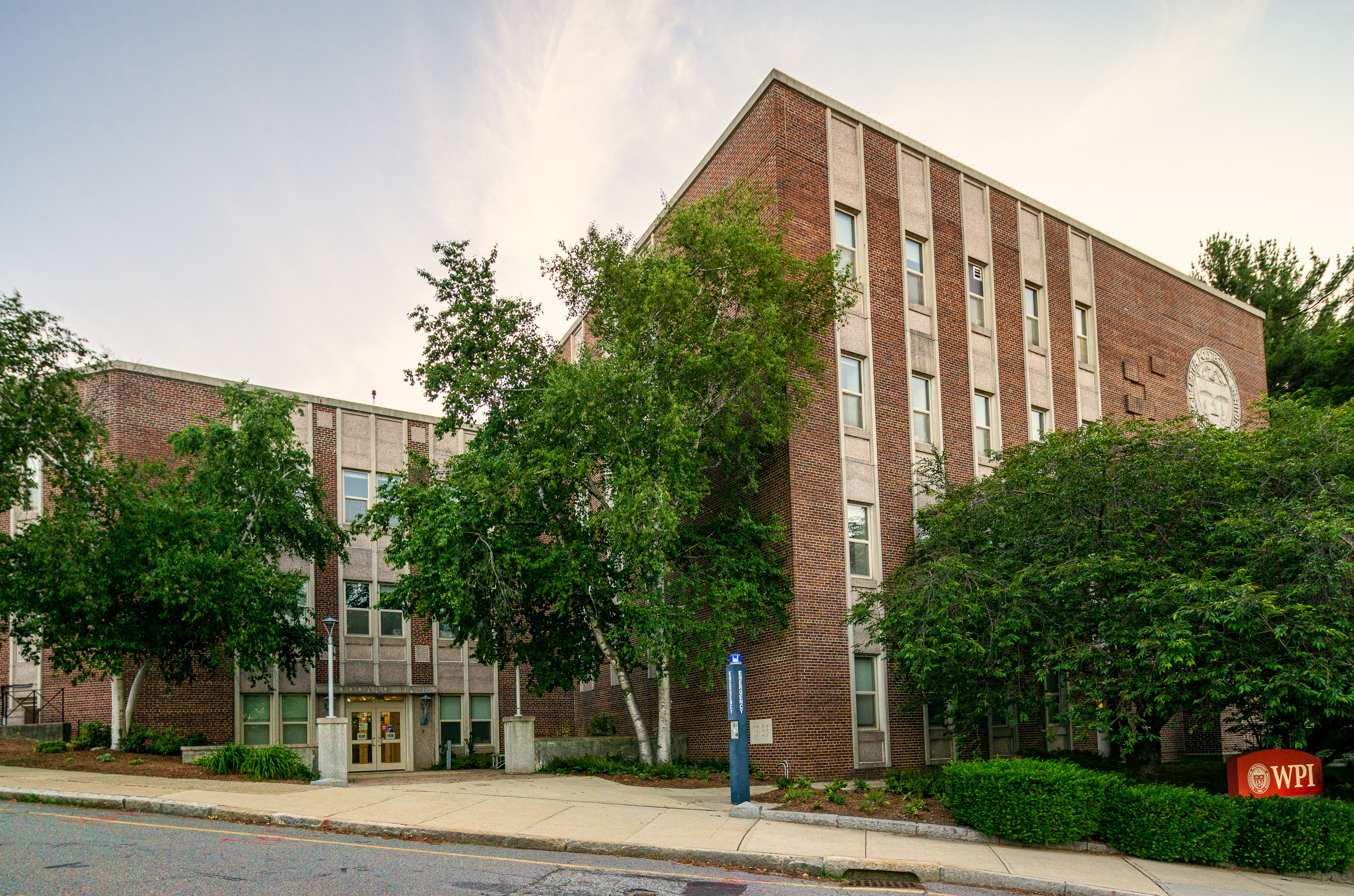
Goddard Hall, named for alumnus Robert H. Goddard

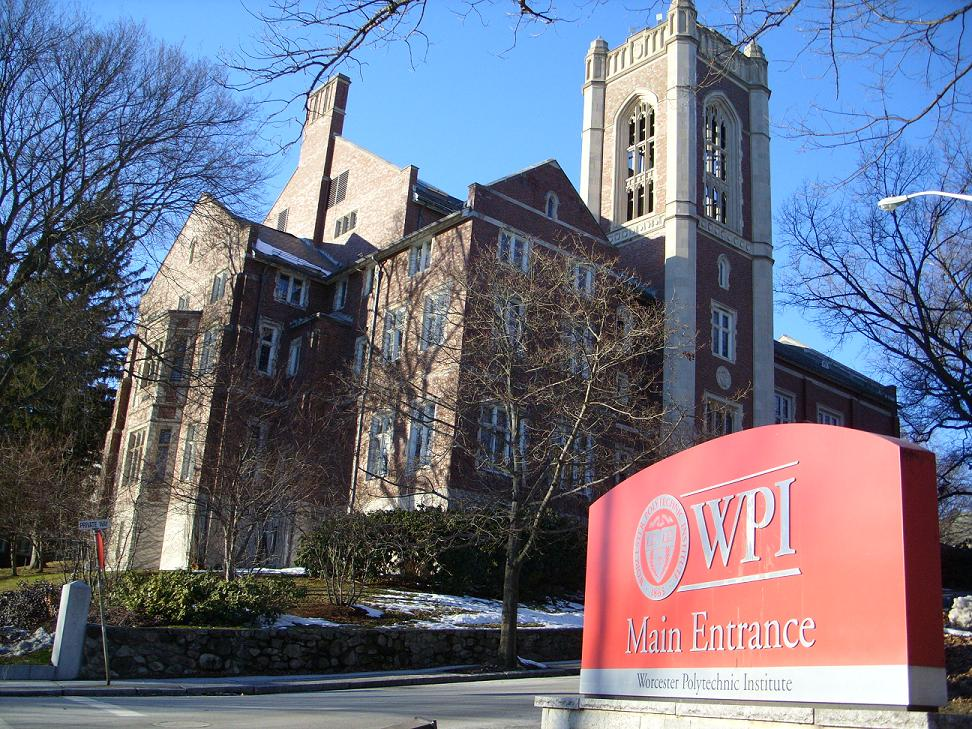
Alden Memorial

== Academics ==
=== Project-based learning system ===
WPI's curriculum is focused on project-based learning, an emphasis established in 1970 as part of what was called the WPI Plan.

==== WPILib ====
WPILib, which was created by and is maintained by Worcester Polytechnic Institute, is the software library and documentation used for programming and controlling robots in the FIRST Robotics Competition and FIRST Tech Challenge. It uses three programming languages, which are Java, C++, and Python.

==== WPI Plan ====
WPI has 7-week terms, labeled A through D, with optional E Terms (session 1 and session 2) in the summer. Students typically take three courses during each term, which allows students to complete a year's worth of Chemistry, Physics, Mathematics, etc. in only one semester. The graduate student calendar follows a mixed schedule of conventional two semester classes and traditional 7-week courses. Unlike many other universities, WPI does not have required academic prerequisites.

==== Global Projects Program ====
Through the Global Projects Program, over 60% of WPI students complete at least one of their required projects at an off-campus Project Center. Through the Global Projects Program, WPI sends more engineering students abroad than any US college or university. As of the 2019–2020 academic year, the program included over 50 Project Centers on six continents.

==== Interactive Qualifying Project ====
The Interactive Qualifying Project (IQP) is described as a "project which relates technology and science to society or human needs." This project is very broad in scope, encompassing a wide variety of topics and actions. Generally, IQPs are designed to solve a societal problem using technology. This can range from improving high school science education to redesigning an irrigation system in Thailand. This project is often done off-campus through WPI's Global Projects Program. From an educational perspective, the IQP serves to emphasize team-based work and introduces a real-world responsibility absent from courses. Many IQPs have made a significant impact on the community in which they are done.

==== Major Qualifying Project ====
The Major Qualifying Project (MQP) assesses knowledge in a student's field of study. As mentioned above, this project is similar to a senior thesis, with students doing independent research or design. MQPs are often funded by either WPI or external corporations. Topics of MQPs done in the recent past include the design of the MIR 2 space station life support system module, a study of the effects of stress and nicotine on ADHD, the design of a research rocket, a mathematical viscoelastic cell motility model, experimental research of liquid crystals using atomic force microscopy, and the design of polymers for medicine delivery.

=== Rankings and reputation ===
Academic rankings

National
- Forbes: 93
- U.S. News & World Report: 73
- Washington Monthly: 99
- WSJ/College Pulse: 120

Global
- ARWU: 901-1000
- QS: 901-950
- THE: 601-800
- U.S. News & World Report: 1,449

WPI was ranked tied for 73rd among national universities in U.S. News & World Report's 2027 review of "Best Colleges" in the U.S. U.S. News & World Report also rated it tied at 63rd for "Most Innovative", 77th for "Best Value", and tied for 291st for "Top Performers on Social Mobility" among national universities.

In 2013, Businessweek ranked WPI No. 1 in the nation for its part-time Master of Business Administration (MBA) program, and No. 1 in the nation for student satisfaction in the program.

In August 2019, Forbes magazine's annual ranking of "America's Top Colleges" placed WPI at No. 93. "Forbes' college ranking is distinguished by its consumer-centric approach," said Caroline Howard, Director of Editorial Operations, Forbes. "The evaluation of the 650 undergraduate institutions is based exclusively on the quality of the education they provide, the experiences of the students and their post-graduate success and financial well-being."

In 2017, WPI received a gold rating through Sustainability, Tracking, Assessment, and Rating System (also known as STARS) for its sustainability efforts. Worcester Polytechnic Institute is accredited by the New England Commission of Higher Education. In 2025, U.S. News ranked WPI 18th nationally for return on investment.

== Campus life ==
=== Traditions ===
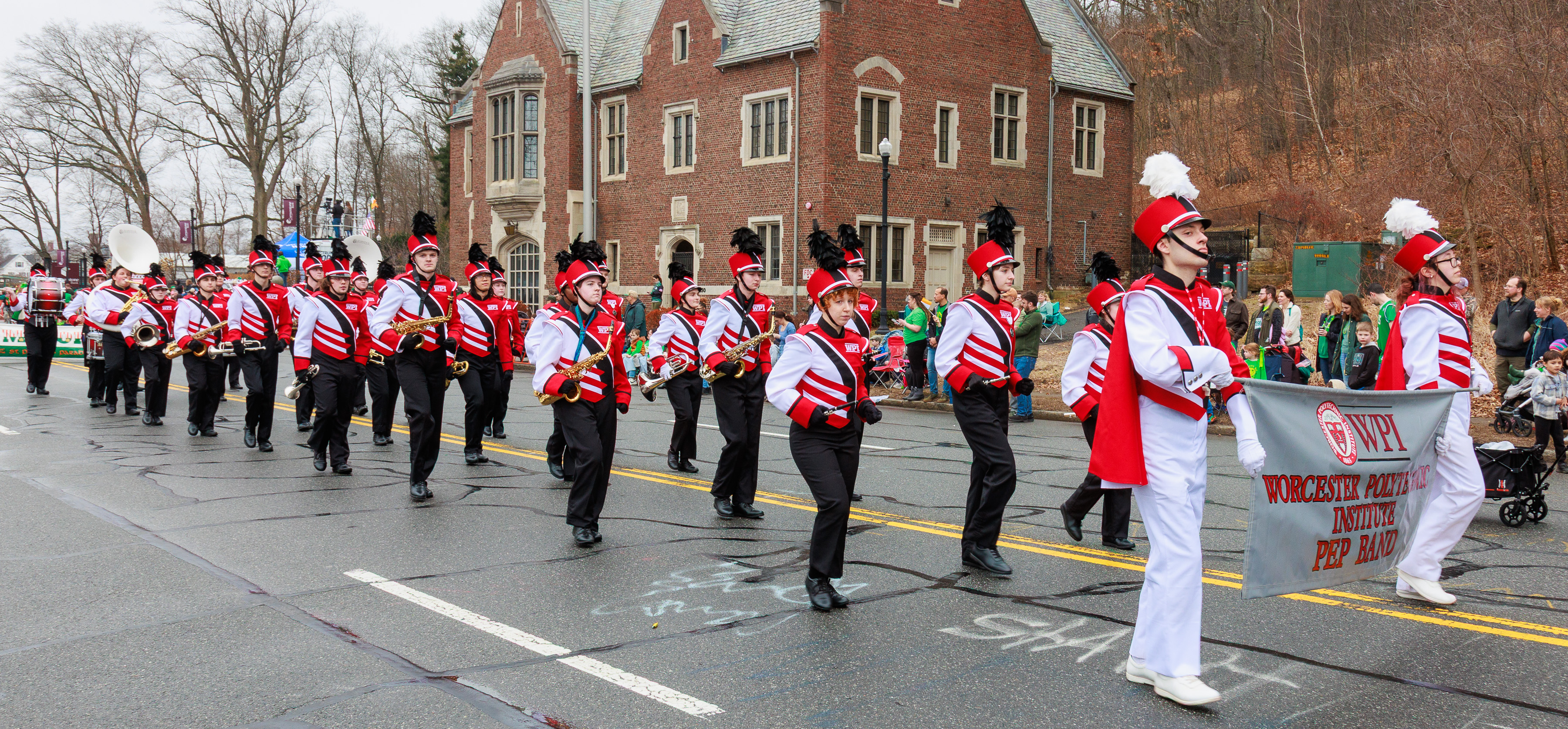
Marching and Pep Band

- WPI Marching and Pep Band — The band is a student-run organization with approximately 100 members.
- Weekend Movies – Every Saturday and Sunday, a new film is shown on the WPI campus in Fuller Laboratories. WPI is one of the few universities capable of showing both 35 mm film and 70 mm film in the same hall.
- Winter Ball – A ballroom dance social hosted by WPI's Ballroom Dance Team during the winter where couples in evening wear can learn and dance ballroom dances such as Waltz, Foxtrot, ChaCha, and Rumba in Alden Memorial.

=== Athletics ===
WPI supports 20 varsity athletic teams that compete in the New England Women's and Men's Athletic Conference, New England Wrestling Association, and the Eastern College Athletic Conference. WPI athletic teams compete intercollegiately at the NCAA Division III level.

==== Athletic center ====
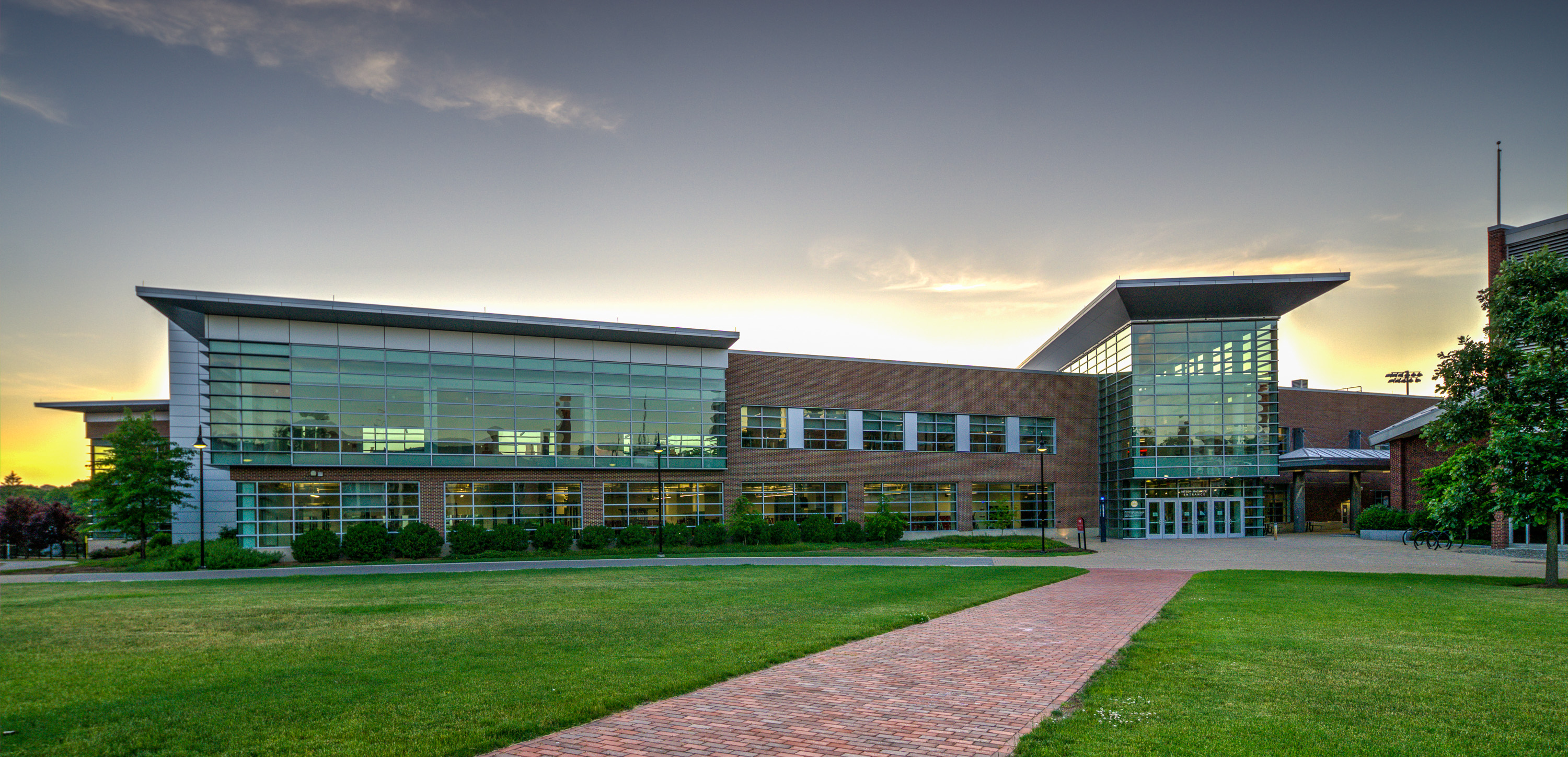
WPI Sports and Recreation Center

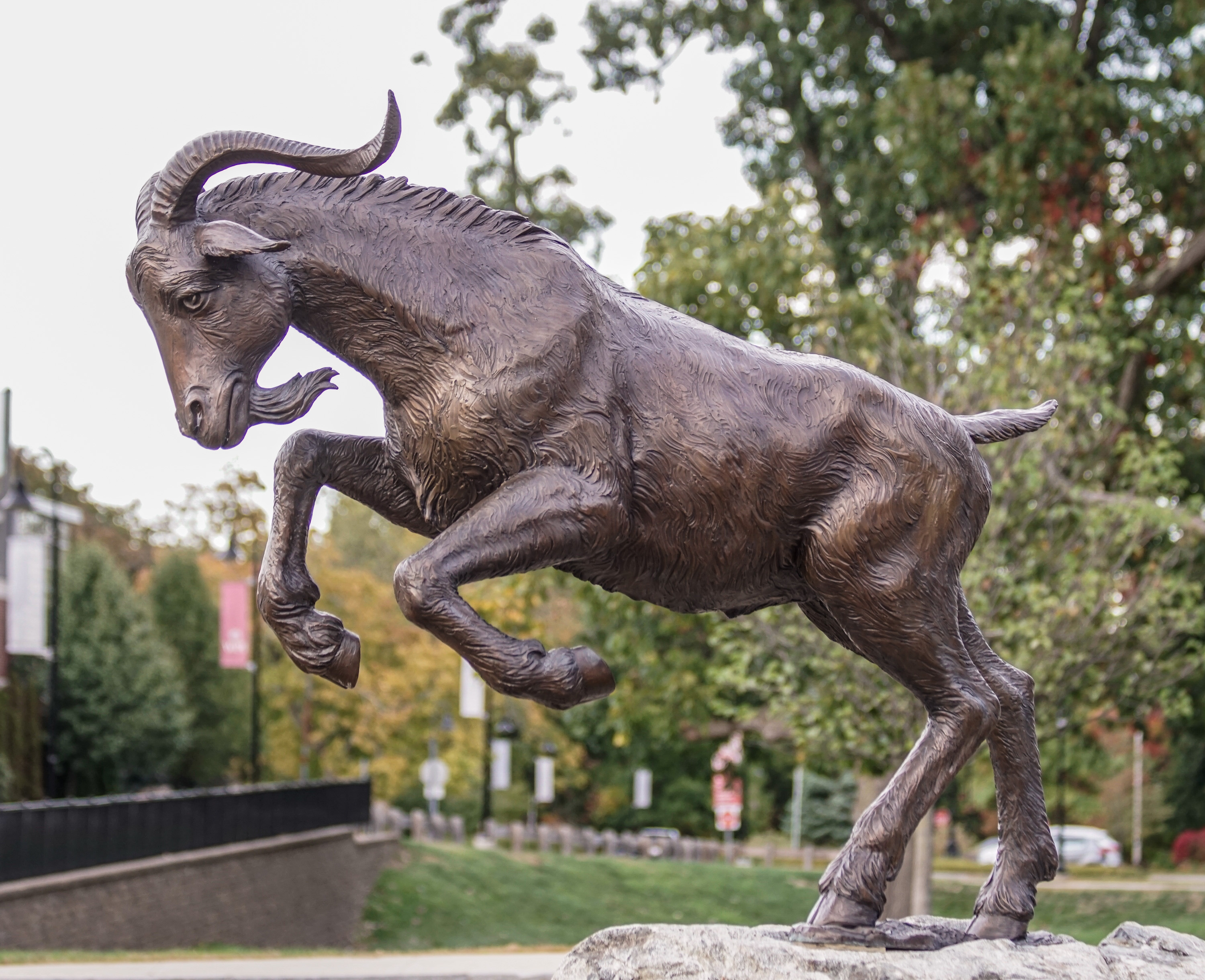
Gompei the Goat, WPI mascot

WPI's 145,000-square-foot (13,500 m^{2}), LEED-certified building Sports and Recreation Center was dedicated in 2012, and includes racquetball and squash courts, jogging track, and swimming pool.

==== Mascot ====
In the spring of 1891, the class of 1893 stole a goat and used it as a mascot. The goat was tended by a Japanese-born student, Gumpei (Gompei) Kuwada, because he was the only one with the initials G.K. in reference to the job of goat keeper.

The mascot of WPI is still a goat and in honor of the first goat keeper the mascot's name is Gompei.

=== Media ===
Tech News is WPI's student newspaper, published weekly on Tuesdays. It has gone through multiple names, including The Towers, and was often published biweekly. Renamed in 2018, it is now published online and on paper. Official campus publications include WPI Today for news and media releases and WPI Journal, the university's magazine.

=== Wireless Association (W1YK) ===
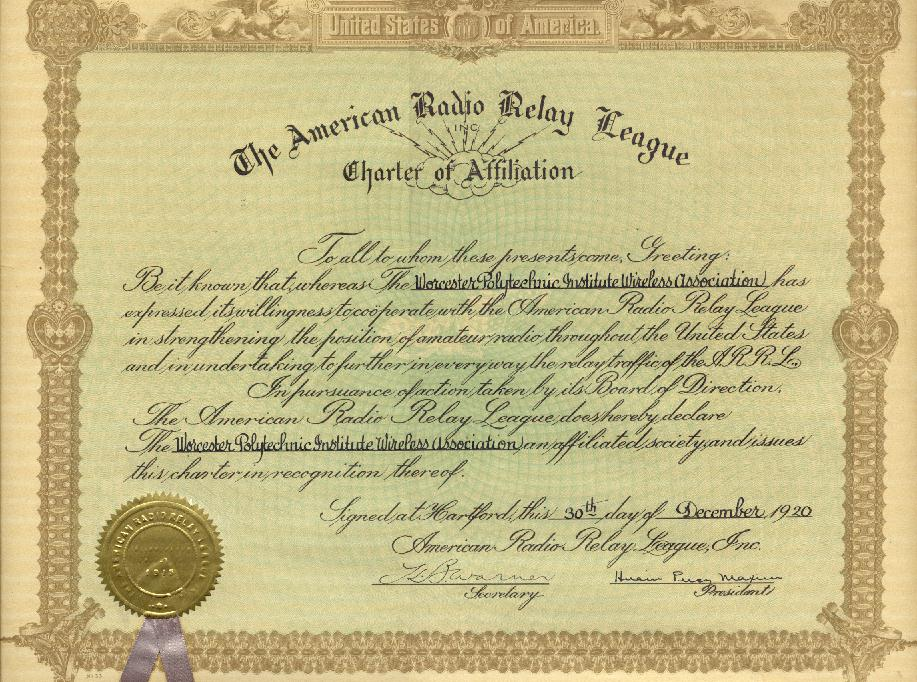
Charter of affiliation of the Wireless Association with the ARRL (1920)

The WPI Wireless Association is regarded as the first College Amateur Radio Club to be on the air. The current club has members with licenses ranging from Technician to the highest class, Amateur Extra. The club currently and has operated for decades out of the radio shack on the roof of Salisbury Laboratories. The club manages several public repeaters that reach around Worcester such as the Higgins Repeater. W1YK, the official Federal Communications Commission-licensed callsign of the club, and its members participate in the American Radio Relay League Sweepstakes each year, including the November Sweeps. The members of the club participate in marathons, triathlons, and other events that need radio operators.
