= Harold Weekes =

American football player (1880–1950)

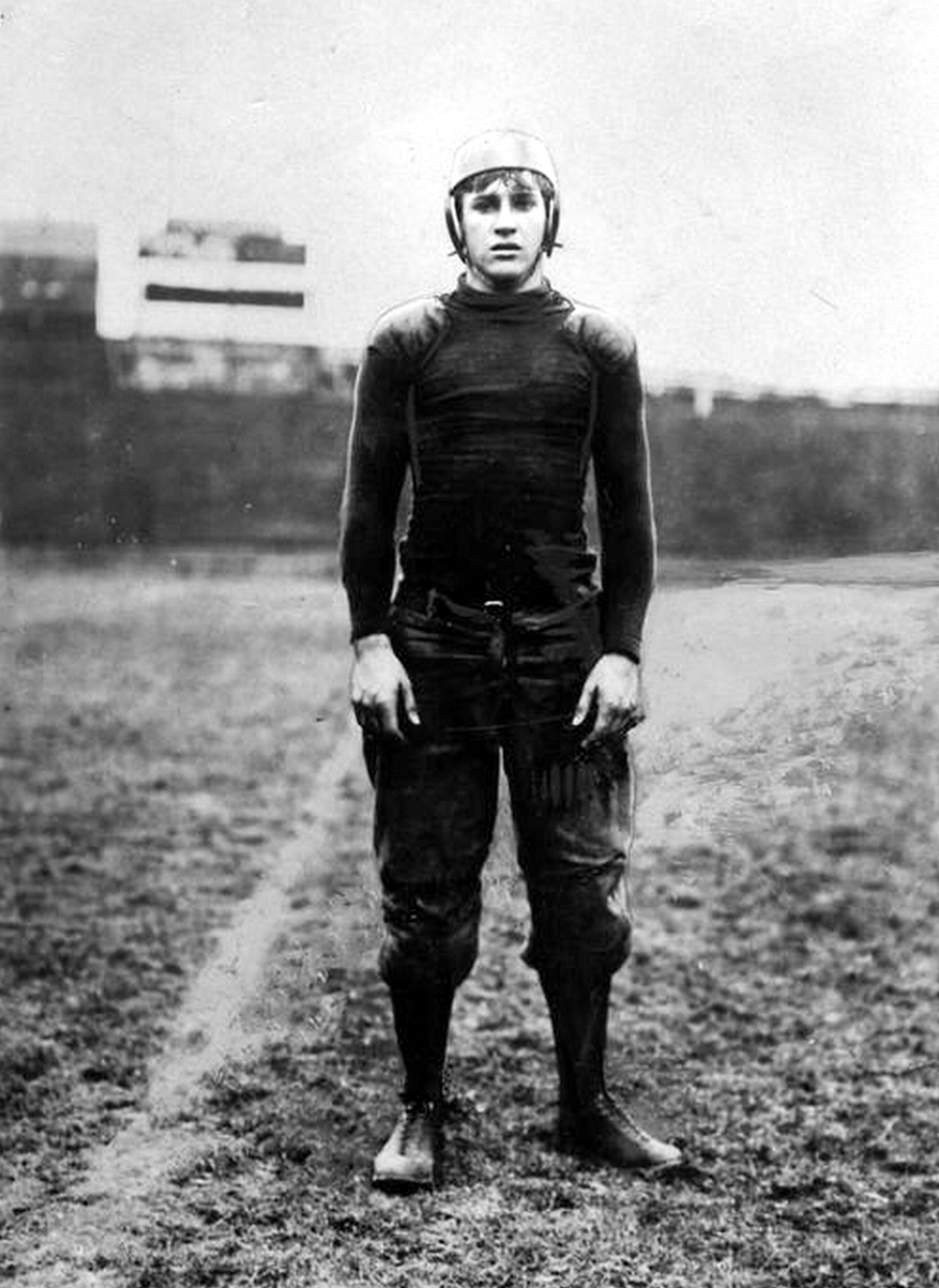

Profile
- Position: Halfback
- Class: 1903

Personal information
- Born: April 2, 1880; Oyster Bay, New York, U.S.
- Died: July 6, 1950 (aged 70); New York, New York, U.S.
- Listed height: 5 ft 10 in (1.78 m)
- Listed weight: 178 lb (81 kg)

Career information
- College: Columbia (1899–1902)

Awards and highlights
- Consensus All-American (1901); 2× Second-team All-American (1900, 1902); Third-team All-American (1899); Camp All-time All-America team

Harold Hathaway Weekes (April 2, 1880 – July 6, 1950) was an American college football player. Weekes played halfback for the Columbia University Lions (1899-1902), and he served as team captain during his senior year. Weekes received induction into the College Football Hall of Fame in 1954 as the first of seven Columbia players enshrined. In 1962, the book Football Immortals profiled Weekes for their selection of the greatest 64 American football players from the game's first 93 years. The Bill Shannon Biographical Dictionary of New York Sports termed him a "145-pound lightning bolt" who "hit the college football scene like a shot". During Weekes's college football career, Columbia won 29 games, including 19 shutouts.

== Early life and education ==
Weekes was born on April 2, 1880. He grew up in the town of Oyster Bay, New York on Long Island. In 1899, Weekes graduated from the Morristown School (now Morristown-Beard School) in Morristown, New Jersey after playing in the backfield on the school's football team.

== Columbia ==
He graduated from Columbia with his bachelor's degree in 1903 after serving as class vice president. Weekes's graduating class voted him "most popular man" on campus, "best athlete", and "most modest man".

Beyond football, Weekes attained achievements in other athletic pursuits at Columbia. Weekes, who competed on the track team, equaled the world indoor record for the 60-yard dash in 1900 with a time of 0:06 2-5. The following year, he set Columbia's school records for the indoor 40-yard dash (with a time of 0:04 4-5) and the 180-yard dash (with a time of 0:19 2-5). That April, Columbia hung a tablet in the school gymnasium to showcase 11 recently shattered athletic records, including Weekes's. He later set the school record for the indoor 100-yard dash that year with a time of 0:10 1-5.

During his athletic career, Weekes played as an outfielder (left/center field) on Columbia's baseball team and as a member of second crew for their rowing team. In 1901, he won Columbia's strongman competition with a score of 1709 points on the strength test. In the spring of his senior year, Weekes competed in intramural hockey at Columbia. He played the position of point (now known as defenseman).

=== Football ===
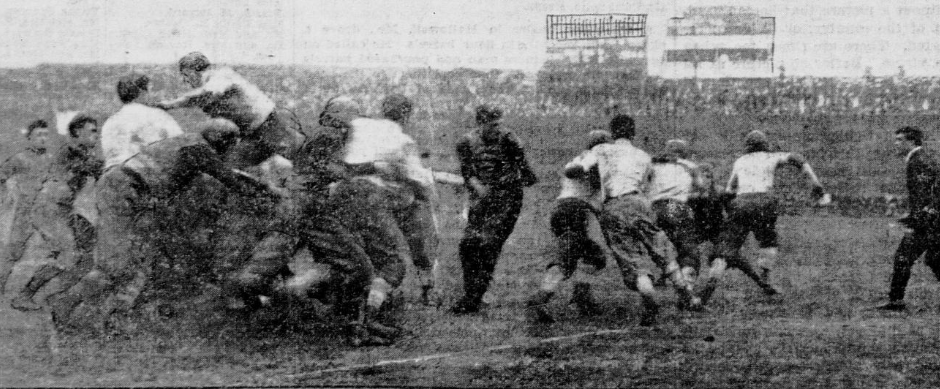
Weekes dives for a touchdown in Columbia's 12-5 loss to Yale in 1900; this was one of just two touchdowns given up by Yale during the 1900 season.

In the 1902-1903 school year, noted poet George Edward Woodberry (then a Columbia professor) penned a poem titled "To 1903, Columbia". He dedicated this poem to the senior class. The eighth and ninth stanzas of "To 1903, Columbia" paid tribute to Weekes's achievements on the football field:

The years of football your bright records grace;

Game called, you saw me always in my place;

I taught your Harold, the famed Fennel Race;

And glad I saw him down the dazed field skim;

In his first years; and much I honor him;

Bourne shoulder-high, until my eyes grow dim.

— George Edward Woodberry, "To 1903, Columbia", Poems: My Country, Wild Eden, The Players' Elegy, The North Shore Watch, Odes and Sonnets

During Weekes's time at Columbia, an article in the school literary magazine (Columbia Literary Monthly) noted how he helped arouse the school spirit. Describing his impact on Columbia's athletics and student life, a 1902 New York Times article titled "Columbia's Football Hero" wrote:

No Columbia man has ever had a word to say against Weekes. They cherish his deeds, they cherish the traditions that he gave birth to, and most of all they cherish him as a stanch, loyal son of the college for which he gave the best that was in him in victory and in defeat.

— R. C. M., The New York Times, "Columbia's Football Hero"

In 1927, Weekes and two other former Columbia Lions (Bert Wilson and David Smythe) visited Columbia to speak at Baker Field (now Robert K. Kraft Field at Lawrence A. Wien Stadium). George Trevor, The New York Sun's football editor, selected Weekes for First Team on Columbia's all-time football team that year. Trevor named him as Columbia's greatest football player of all time. In 2000, a panel of journalists and historians selected Weekes for Columbia's 24-member Football Team of the Century. Twelve years later, Columbia inducted Weekes into their athletic hall of fame at a ceremony held at the school's Low Memorial Library.

==== 1899: upset of Yale ====
During his freshman year, Weekes played an integral role in the Columbia Lions' 1899 upset of the Yale Bulldogs at Manhattan Field. The heavily favored Bulldogs entered the game undefeated with a 5-0 record. While notching five consecutive shutouts in those games, Yale had scored a combined 115 points (for an average of 23 points per game.) At the time, Yale carried a reputation as a perennial powerhouse. In stark contrast, Columbia had just resumed playing football that season after a seven-year absence from the game (1892-1898).

Returning a kick in the second half of Columbia's game against Yale, Weekes sprinted 50 yards to score a touchdown. During the run, he successfully thwarted the tackling attempts of several Yale players, including the team captain. Weekes's scoring play for Columbia marked the only points in a 5-0 shutout of Yale. Columbia's surprise upset victory represented the first time in 28 seasons that a team other than Harvard, Princeton, or the University of Pennsylvania shut out Yale. The 1899 victory also marked Columbia's first defeat of Yale in 24 years.

==== 1900–1902: three time All-American ====
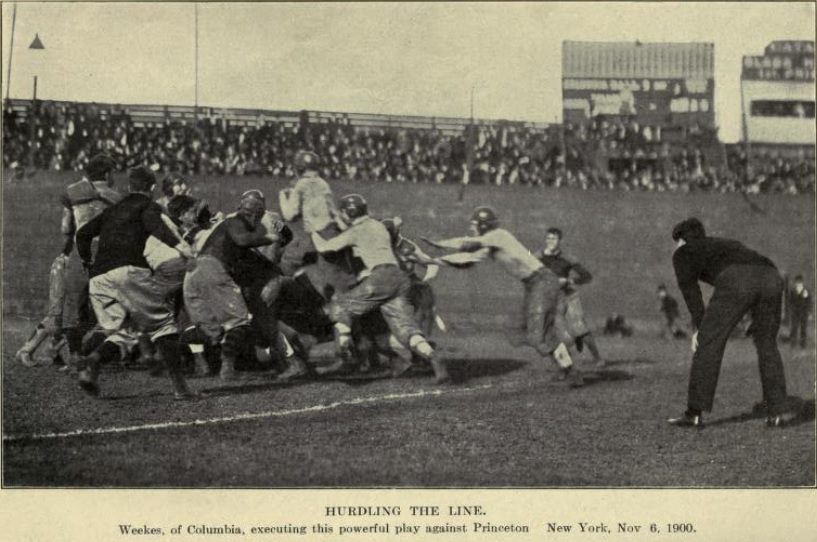
A week after Yale, Weekes hurdles the line against Princeton.

Weekes and teammate Charles Wright were the first two Columbia Lions football players to make the College Football All-America Team. Playing under head coaches George Foster Sanford and Bill Morley, Weekes received selection to the All-America Team three times (1900-1902). Walter Camp, an official selector, selected him for the 1900 All-America team and the 1901 All-America team. Caspar Whitney, another official selector, selected Weekes for the 1902 All-America team.

Using his athletic talents, Weekes achieved particular notoriety in football for his prowess with the "flying hurdle", a daredevil play. After the hurdler stood atop the shoulders of his teammates, they propelled him over the defenders' heads to launch long runs. Weekes showed a natural talent for keeping his feet post-hurdle, which enabled him to sprint past frequently surprised defenses.

In December 1902, more than 600 Columbia students attended a mass meeting held to honor the accomplishments of Weekes and football coach Bill Morley. The student body presented Weekes with a silver loving cup to show their appreciation for his accomplishments at the school. Drawing tears, Weekes thanked them with a short speech :

Columbia men, all I can do is to thank you again and again. I shall treasure this cup more than anything I shall ever have. I hope always to be in Columbia athletics. Morley, I feel, will be back next year. He cannot stay away. As for myself, I hope to be back next Fall, playing on the scrub. I thank you.

— Harold H. Weekes

In the fall of 1903, Weekes returned to the school to work as an assistant coach on the Columbia football team.

==== Legacy ====
Weekes demonstrated a knack for making best use of his combination of speed, strength, and athletic judgement. In 1909, Walter Camp penned an article for Outing Magazine titled "Heroes of the Gridiron" that described this prowess. Camp identified Weekes as "unquestionably, in his day, the best end runner in the country". Camp's article further noted:

It was not alone that he had such phenomenal speed, nor that he had the weight and muscular strength that told, but it was the combination of these with good judgment and the ability to put on speed at the right moment. Behind it all was a love for the feel of the ball under his arm and the rush by the end of the line which only those who have once enjoyed it can appreciate.

— Walter Camp, "Heroes of the Gridiron," Outing Magazine

Herbert Reed's 1913 book Football for Public and Player concurred with Camp's assessment of Weekes's gift for speed. Reed noted:

Harold Weekes of Columbia was another backfield genius who stands near the top. I know of no other back in the history of the game who was able to put on a greater burst of speed at the instant of turning an end than Weekes. ... His end running was the one thing in which he relied upon his own superb speed and judgment of pace. In this he was practically beyond coaching, a law unto himself.

— Herbert Reed, "Genius on the Gridion," Football for Public and Player

== Career after college ==
After college, Weekes entered his professional career as a stockbroker with a seat on the New York Stock Exchange. He joined the firm Thomas, Maclay, and Company.

=== Stamp collecting ===
While working in finance, Weekes grew an expansive stamp collection. In 1934, he sold this stamp collection for $1 million. Describing the sale, a stamp magazine suggested it was likely the "largest all-cash transaction that has ever been negotiated for a stamp collection".

=== Bruin's tree climb ===
Weekes and his younger brother Bradford Weekes (who also played for Morristown School) owned a 300-pound brown bear named Bruin as a pet. In the spring of 1907, Bruin broke loose, made for a nearby tree, and climbed it. His climb led to widespread commotion among the townspeople who tried various methods to get him down. They unsuccessfully tried lassoing Bruin away from the tree and then scaring him from the tree by setting a fire. Finally, Bruin smelled the scent of food placed at the foot of the tree and descended to his den.

== Family ==
Weekes married his wife Louisine Peters in 1906. They had a daughter together, Hathaway. Following his divorce from Louisine Peters Weekes in 1926, Weekes married Frances Stokes Clark in 1933. After Weekes died in 1950, his daughter endowed the Trade with the Orient Exhibit at the American Museum in Britain in memory of her father. She also established the Harold H. Weekes Fund at Columbia. The Weekes Fund supported Columbia's Phlamoudhi Archeological Project in Phlamoudhi, a village on the island of Cyprus.

=== Home at Wereholme ===
Weekes and his wife owned a house known as Wereholme in Islip, New York on Long Island. Built by noted architect Grosvenor Atterbury, the building showcases the French Provincial style of architecture. In 2006, Suffolk County, New York purchased Wereholme. After renovating the property between 2006 and 2010, the county opened Suffolk County Environmental Center at Wereholme on Earth Day 2010. Located near the Great South Bay and Seatuck National Wildlife Refuge, the center runs public and private nature programs. In 2007, the National Register of Historic Places registered Wereholme on their list of historic properties in the U.S.
