= Boulder River (Sweet Grass County, Montana) =

River in the United States of America

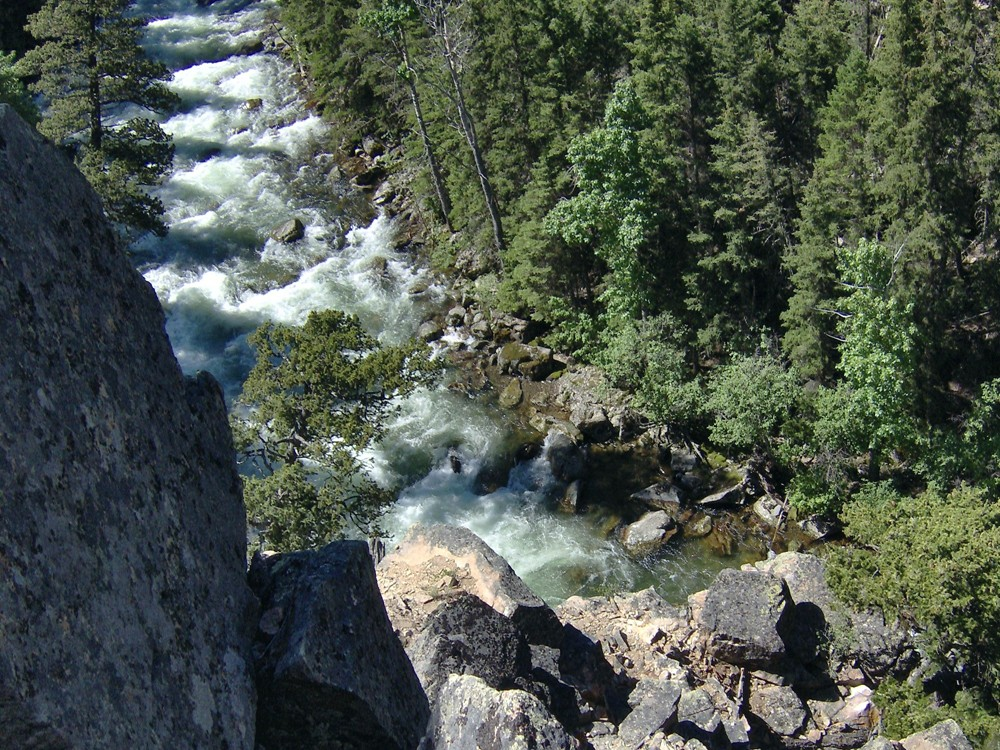
- A section of the upper Boulder River

Location
- Country: Park and Sweet Grass County, Montana

Physical characteristics
- Source
  - coordinates: 45°10′25″N 110°13′31″W
- Mouth
  - coordinates: 45°51′10″N 109°55′25″W
  - elevation: 4,003 feet (1,220 m)

Basin features
- River system: Yellowstone River

The Boulder River is a tributary of the Yellowstone River, approximately 60 mi (96 km) long, in south central Montana in the United States. It is one of two rivers named the Boulder River in Montana.

It rises in the Gallatin National Forest in the Absaroka Range in southern Park County. It flows north through mountainous canyons, a cataract under a natural bridge, and northwest in a widening valley past McLeod. It joins the Yellowstone at Big Timber. The landscape of the Boulder River and river valley has merited the filming of two movies: A River Runs Through It and The Horse Whisperer.

== Discharges ==
River	Location	Discharge
East Boulder River	near McLeod	80 cu ft/s (2.3 m^{3}/s)
West Boulder River	McLeod	189 cu ft/s (5.4 m^{3}/s)
Boulder River	Big Timber	563 cu ft/s (15.9 m^{3}/s)

== Tourism ==
The river is a popular destination for fly fishing. Other attractions in the valley include several church camps, a guest ranch, and several USFS campgrounds. The Forest Service also maintains several guard stations, trailheads, and picnic areas in the valley.

== Variant names ==
The Boulder River has also been known as: Rivers a Cross, Rivers across, and Rivers-across. And, to distinguish it from the other Boulder River in Montana, it is sometimes called the "East Boulder River" (as it is east of the other) or the "Boulder Fork of the Yellowstone," parallel with the Clark's Fork of the Yellowstone as differentiated from the Clark's Fork River of Western Montana.

== Climate ==
The Placer Basin SNOTEL weather station is situated near the source of the East Boulder River, at an elevation of 8830 feet (2691 m).

Climate data for Placer Basin, Montana, 1991–2020 normals: 8830ft (2691m)
Month	Jan	Feb	Mar	Apr	May	Jun	Jul	Aug	Sep	Oct	Nov	Dec	Year
Record high °F (°C)	54 (12)	55 (13)	57 (14)	66 (19)	71 (22)	78 (26)	82 (28)	83 (28)	77 (25)	71 (22)	59 (15)	50 (10)	83 (28)
Mean maximum °F (°C)	43.8 (6.6)	44.6 (7.0)	51.8 (11.0)	58.7 (14.8)	65.5 (18.6)	72.1 (22.3)	76.8 (24.9)	75.9 (24.4)	72.1 (22.3)	61.9 (16.6)	50.1 (10.1)	40.5 (4.7)	77.6 (25.3)
Mean daily maximum °F (°C)	27.2 (−2.7)	29.1 (−1.6)	36.6 (2.6)	41.9 (5.5)	50.1 (10.1)	57.9 (14.4)	67.0 (19.4)	65.9 (18.8)	57.0 (13.9)	43.7 (6.5)	32.5 (0.3)	25.5 (−3.6)	44.5 (7.0)
Daily mean °F (°C)	17.1 (−8.3)	17.1 (−8.3)	23.6 (−4.7)	28.8 (−1.8)	37.6 (3.1)	44.8 (7.1)	51.6 (10.9)	50.3 (10.2)	43.4 (6.3)	32.7 (0.4)	22.5 (−5.3)	15.6 (−9.1)	32.1 (0.0)
Mean daily minimum °F (°C)	7.0 (−13.9)	5.2 (−14.9)	10.5 (−11.9)	15.6 (−9.1)	25.1 (−3.8)	31.7 (−0.2)	36.2 (2.3)	34.7 (1.5)	29.7 (−1.3)	21.6 (−5.8)	12.3 (−10.9)	5.8 (−14.6)	19.6 (−6.9)
Mean minimum °F (°C)	−20.1 (−28.9)	−23.3 (−30.7)	−15.1 (−26.2)	−6.1 (−21.2)	5.9 (−14.5)	23.0 (−5.0)	29.5 (−1.4)	26.8 (−2.9)	16.7 (−8.5)	−3.0 (−19.4)	−14.4 (−25.8)	−21.8 (−29.9)	−31.9 (−35.5)
Record low °F (°C)	−41 (−41)	−40 (−40)	−32 (−36)	−24 (−31)	−5 (−21)	10 (−12)	24 (−4)	17 (−8)	−1 (−18)	−26 (−32)	−37 (−38)	−39 (−39)	−41 (−41)
Average precipitation inches (mm)	2.90 (74)	3.01 (76)	3.44 (87)	4.22 (107)	4.51 (115)	3.39 (86)	1.84 (47)	1.72 (44)	2.01 (51)	3.48 (88)	3.12 (79)	3.11 (79)	36.75 (933)
Source 1: XMACIS2
Source 2: NOAA (Precipitation)

== See also ==
- List of rivers of Montana
- Montana Stream Access Law
