= Bolder =

Bolder is an English surname. Notable people with the surname include:

- Adam Bolder (born 1980), English footballer
- Bob Bolder (born 1958), English footballer
- Chris Bolder (born 1982), English footballer
- Linda Bolder (born 1988), Israeli-Dutch Olympic judoka
- Robert Bolder (1859–1937), English film actor
- Trevor Bolder (1950–2013), English rock bass guitarist

== See also ==
- Bould (surname)
- Boulder (disambiguation)
