= Boulder River =

Boulder River may refer to:

- The Boulder River (southwestern Montana), a tributary of the Jefferson River in Jefferson County, southwestern Montana in the United States
- The Boulder River (Sweet Grass County, Montana), a tributary of the Yellowstone River in Sweet Grass County, south central Montana in the United States
- The Boulder River (Washington), a tributary of the North Fork Stillaguamish River in Washington (U.S. state) in the United States
- The Boulder River, New Zealand, a small river in the north of the South Island of New Zealand
- The Boulder River (Minnesota), a river of Minnesota

== See also ==
- Boulder (disambiguation)
