= Shore Road Historic District =

Historic district in New York, United States

- U.S. National Register of Historic Places
- U.S. Historic district
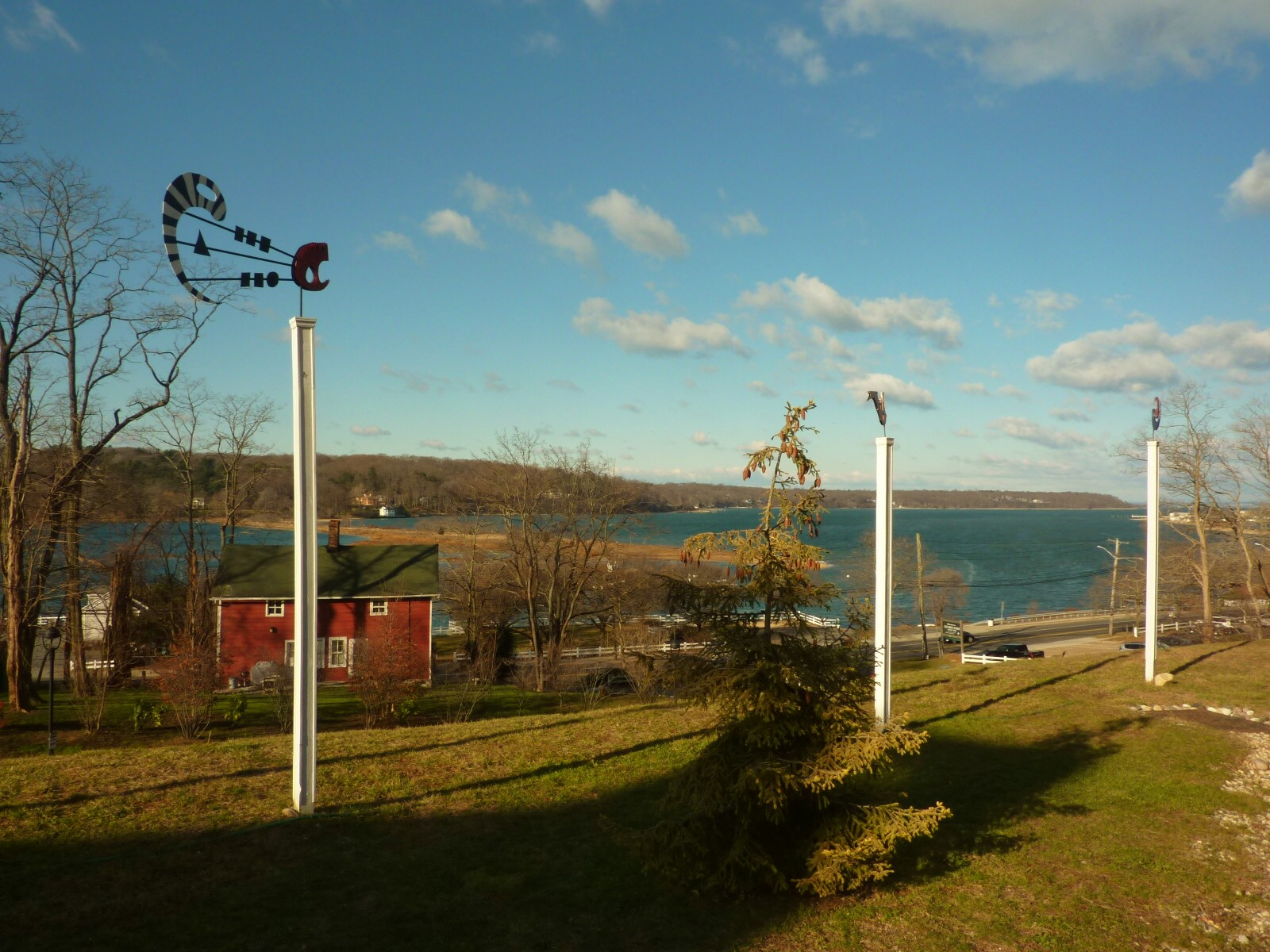
- Shore Road Historic District. December 2011.

- Location within New York Location within the United States
- Location: Shore Rd., Cold Spring Harbor, New York
- Coordinates: 40°52′22″N 73°27′45″W
- Area: 36 acres (15 ha)
- Architect: Atterbury, Grosvenor; Multiple
- Architectural style: Greek Revival, Stick/Eastlake, Federal
- MPS: Huntington Town MRA
- NRHP reference No.: 85002578
- Added to NRHP: September 26, 1985

Shore Road Historic District is a national historic district located at Cold Spring Harbor in Suffolk County, New York. The district has 20 contributing residential buildings. They sit at the foot of a steep wooded bluff and date from the early 19th century, the oldest dating to about 1790. It includes works by architect Grosvenor Atterbury.

It was added to the National Register of Historic Places in 1985.
