= Nest Thermostat =

Smart thermostat

- The Nest Thermostat's front screen
- Developer: Google Nest
- Type: Smart thermostat
- Released: 2011; 15 years ago
- Website: Official website

The Nest Thermostat is a smart thermostat developed by Google Nest and designed by Tony Fadell, Ben Filson, and Fred Bould. It is an electronic, programmable, and self-learning Wi-Fi-enabled thermostat that optimizes heating and cooling of homes and businesses to conserve energy.

The Google Nest Learning Thermostat is based on a machine learning algorithm: for the first weeks users have to regulate the thermostat in order to provide the reference data set. The thermostat can then learn people's schedule, at which temperature they are used to and when. Using built-in sensors and phones' locations, it can shift into energy-saving mode when it realizes nobody is at home.

== Specifications, North American versions ==
Device photo	Generation	Version	Released	Diameter	Screen size	Wi-Fi	802.15.4	Matter	24 V	120– 240 V	Multiple zones	1–2- stage cooling	1–3- stage heating	Forced air	Radiant	Heat pump	Oil	Gas	Electric	Hybrid systems	Humidistat
	1st	1.10	Q4; 2011	3.27"	1.76"	Yes	Yes	No	Yes	No	Yes	1- stage only	1–2- stage only	Yes	Yes	Yes	Yes	Yes	Yes	No	No
	1st	1.12	Q1; 2012	3.27"	1.76"	Yes	Yes	No	Yes	No	Yes	1- stage only	1–2- stage only	Yes	Yes	Yes	Yes	Yes	Yes	No	No
	2nd	2.6	Q3; 2012	3.27"	1.76"	Yes	Yes	No	Yes	No	Yes	Both	All	Yes	Yes	Yes	Yes	Yes	Yes	Yes	Yes
	2nd	2.8	Q3; 2013	3.27"	1.76"	Yes	Yes	No	Yes	No	Yes	Both	All	Yes	Yes	Yes	Yes	Yes	Yes	Yes	Yes
	3rd	3.4	Q4; 2015	3.3"	2.08"	Yes	Yes	No	Yes	No	Yes	Both	All	Yes	Yes	Yes	Yes	Yes	Yes	Yes	Yes
	E	4.x	Q3; 2017	3.19"	1.76"	Yes	Yes	No	Yes	No	Yes	Both	1–2- stage only	Yes	Yes	Yes	Yes	Yes	Yes	Yes	hygrometer
	Nest Thermostat	1.4	Q4; 2020	3.3"	2.4"	Yes	Yes	Yes	Yes	No	Yes	Both	1–2- stage only	Yes	Yes	Yes	Yes	Yes	Yes	Yes	hygrometer
	4th		Q3; 2024	3.9"	2.68"	Yes	Yes	Yes	Yes	No	Yes	Both	All	Yes	Yes	Yes	Yes	Yes	Yes	Yes	Yes

- Note: Generation E and new thermostat supports two stage cooling OR two stage heating OR heatpump due to a shared multi-use terminal.

Model	Release date	End-of-Support
Nest Thermostat 1st generation	October 25, 2011	October 25, 2025
Nest Thermostat 2nd generation	October 2, 2012	October 25, 2025
Nest Thermostat 3rd generation	September 1, 2015	
Nest Thermostat E	August 31, 2017	
Nest Thermostat G4CVZ	October 12, 2020	
Nest Thermostat 4th generation	August 20, 2024	

== Hardware ==
Nest is compatible with most standard HVAC systems that use central heating and cooling and uses industry standard connections to facilitate the control of these appliances.

Nest is not compatible with communicating HVAC systems. Communicating systems are used with some two-stage and all variable-capacity HVAC systems. These systems require just four wires – two power wires for heating and cooling and two for communication between components (see photo).

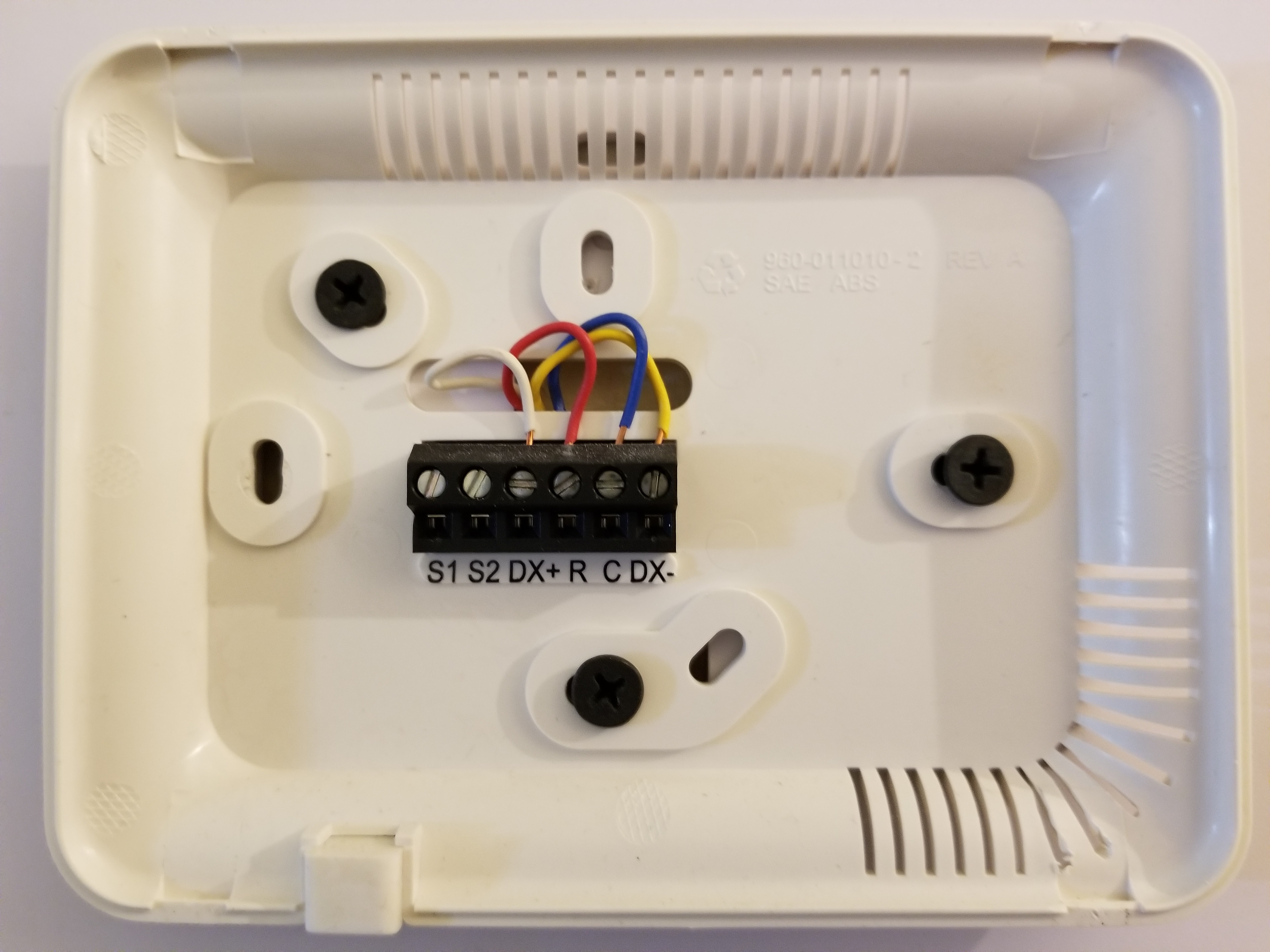
Existing thermostat wires for communicating systems. This system is not compatible with Nest.

Nest consists of two primary pieces of hardware. The display contains the main printed circuit board (PCB) and rotating ring (except for the 2020 Nest Thermostat, which has a touch-sensitive strip on the right side of the thermostat body). The base houses the connection terminals, bubble level, and holes for wall anchors. Neither can function independently; if separated, the display becomes inactive until reconnected to the base.

A special version of Nest is available in Europe, which is capable of controlling 230 volt heating systems. The Nest is paired with a "Heat Link" device, which contains the circuitry required for controlling the mains-voltage heating system. The first release was the 2nd Generation Nest thermostat which the Heat Link controlled the central heating boiler. The 3rd Generation added support for OpenTherm and for controlling domestic hot water. The Nest E was made available to the UK in October 2018. It has several major changes as the thermostat is stand mounted only, the Heat Link is grey and battery powered, the Heat Link loses the domestic hot water support, and lastly designed to be installed on the wall where the old thermostat was located.

As the Nest Thermostat cannot be battery operated, it must either be installed with a wire connecting directly to the "Heatlink" which supplies 12v DC, or mounted on a Stand and powered via a USB cable.

The Nest Temperature Sensor was added in March 2018. Available in Google Store only for United States and Canada. Up to six of these battery operated devices can be added to a single thermostat to provide remote temperature monitoring. Nest will then use the appropriate sensor based on schedule. Since they use Bluetooth Low Energy they are only compatible with the E and 3rd generation thermostats.

With the introduction of the more accessible Google Nest Thermostat on October 12, 2020, it no longer features the rotating ring which is present on other Nest models. It instead uses a touch-sensitive strip on the right side of the thermostat body to adjust temperatures and navigate the thermostat's operating system, with tapping on the touch-sensitive strip replacing physical clicking. It also features presence detection which uses Google ATAP's 60 GHz Project Soli radar, which allows the mirror-like face of the Nest Thermostat to have no visible cutouts for the radar sensor. This enables the thermostat to display the current HVAC status when human presence is detected by the Soli radar sensor. However, Nest Farsight is not supported on this model but poses a similar function at closer distances.

== Software ==
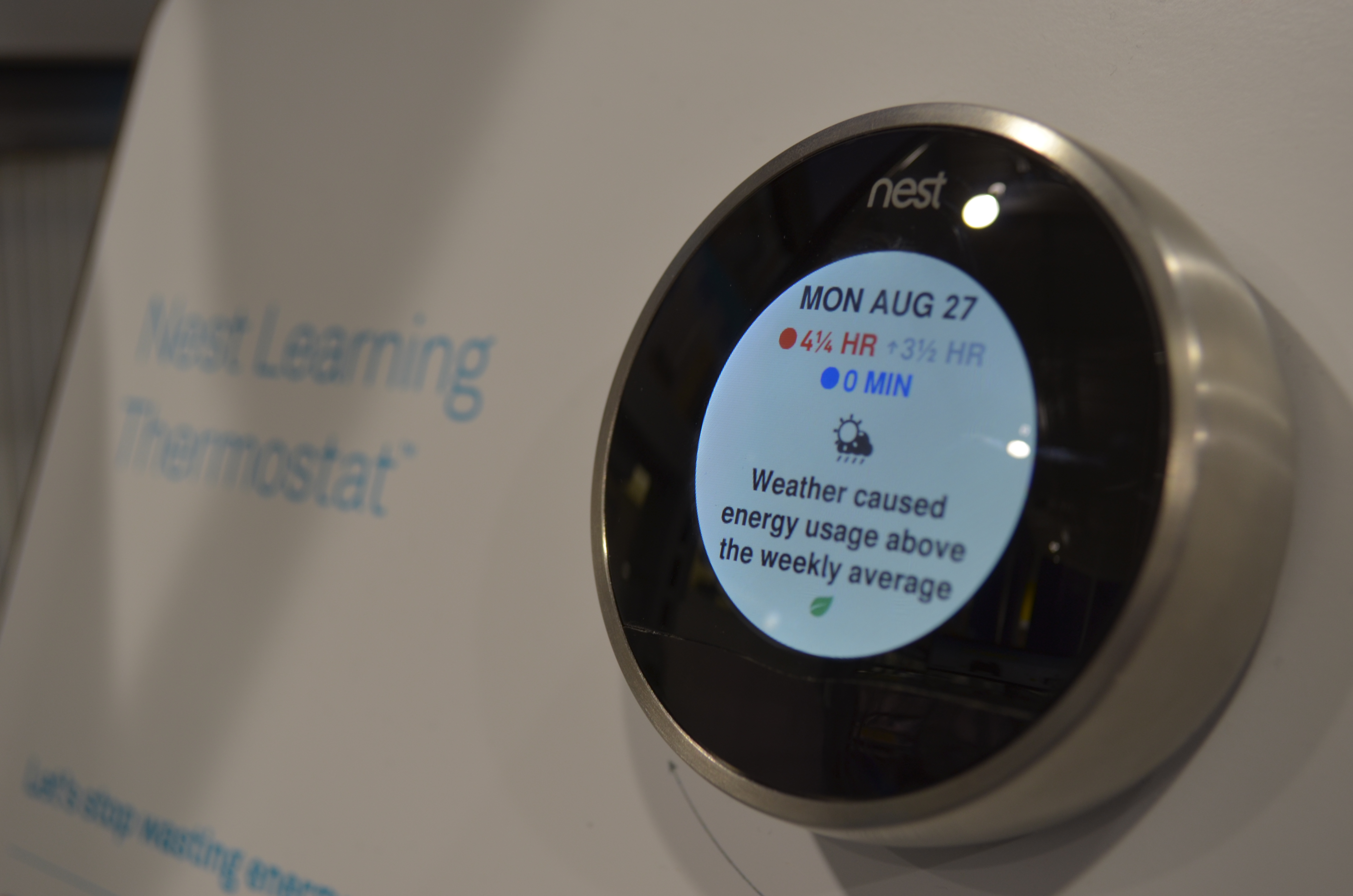
Nest Learning Thermostat showing weather's impact on energy usage

The Nest Thermostat is built around an operating system that allows interaction with the thermostat via spinning and clicking of its control wheel, with sliding and tapping being the input method for the 2020 Nest Thermostat, which brings up option menus for switching from heating to cooling, access to device settings, energy history, and scheduling. Scheduling cannot be modified on the 2020 Nest Thermostat device and must be done in the Google Home app. Users can control Nest without a touch screen or other input device. As the thermostat is connected to the Internet, the company can push updates to fix bugs, improve performance and add additional features. For updates to occur automatically, the thermostat must be connected to Wi‑Fi and the battery must have at least a 3.7 V charge to give enough power to complete the download and installation of the update.

The Nest Thermostat has had a number of software updates. A 2017 security update enables two factor authentication.

The operating system itself is based on Linux 2.6.37 and many other free software components. To comply with the terms of the GPLv3 license under which some components are available, Nest Labs also provides a special firmware image which will unlock the system so that it will accept arbitrary code sent to it.

Nest devices interconnect with each other using a protocol called Weave, which is based on IEEE 802.15.4 and Wi-Fi 802.11 b/g/n.

Starting April 18, 2023 Google Nest G4CVZ Thermostats will be receiving an update to enable Matter connectivity. As of January 2024, only the latest Generation 4 Thermostat currently has this capability.

== Availability ==
Nest is available for sale in the United States, Canada, Mexico, the United Kingdom, Belgium, France, Ireland, the Netherlands, Germany, Austria, Italy, and Spain. It is, however, compatible with many heating and cooling automation systems in other countries. Nest Labs have surveyed existing users known to be outside the areas where it is officially available. Use of the thermostat outside the United States and Canada is complicated by the software setting time and other functions based on the ZIP code. For international users this means they must either disable Wi‑Fi to set the time correctly or use the nearest U.S. zipcode which may result in erratic behavior as the thermostat makes faulty assumptions about inactivity corresponding with either sleep or the home's occupants being away.

In 2013 a man-in-the-middle hack potentially allowed worldwide users to set up their time zone and local weather.

In April 2025, Google announced they would no longer launch new Nest thermostats in Europe, citing challenges with building for a "diverse set of homes".

== Marketing ==
In an effort to increase the number of homes using their learning thermostats, Nest began to partner with energy companies. In February 2014, Direct Energy and Nest laboratories launched their Comfort and Control plan. The plan allowed Canadian customers in Alberta to receive a learning thermostat when they signed up for a five-year electricity contract. In April 2014, Nest announced a partnership with the United Kingdom energy supplier nPower. The partnership offers customers a cut on the Nest installation price and locked energy prices for 5 years, when customers receive both gas and electricity from nPower and paying with direct debit.

In June 2014, Direct Energy and Nest Laboratories expanded the package to Direct Energy's United States market.

== SKUs / model numbers ==
- T100577 is 1st generation, released only in the US
- T200377 is 2nd generation, UK release
- T200477 is 2nd generation, Canada release
- T200577 is 2nd generation, US release
- T200677 is 2nd generation, France, Netherlands, and Belgium release
- T3007EF is 3rd generation, Canada release
- T3007ES is 3rd generation, US release
- T3008US is 3rd generation, US release, pro packaged
- T3010FD is 3rd generation, France release
- T3010GB is 3rd generation, UK release
- T3016US is 3rd generation - black ring, US release
- T3017US is 3rd generation - white ring, US release
- T3018US is 3rd generation - mirror black ring, US release
- T3019US is 3rd generation - polished steel ring, US release
- T3021US is 3rd generation - copper ring, US release
- T3032US is 3rd generation - brass ring, US release
- T3029EX is 3rd generation - black ring, EU release
- T3030EX is 3rd generation - white ring, EU release
- T3031EX is 3rd generation - copper ring, EU release
- T4000ES is Thermostat E, US release
- T4000EF is Thermostat E, Canada release
- HF001235-GB is Thermostat E, UK release
- T5000SF is Temperature Sensor - white, US and Canada release
- GA01334-US is Nest Thermostat G4CVZ - snow, US
- GA02082-US is Nest Thermostat G4CVZ - sand
- GA02081-US is Nest Thermostat G4CVZ - charcoal, US
- GA02083-US is Nest Thermostat G4CVZ - fog, US release
- G5AJK is Temperature Sensor (2nd gen) - white
- GA05169-US is 4th generation - polished obsidian with temperature sensor, US release
- GA05171-US is 4th generation - polished gold with temperature sensor, US release
- GA05551-US is 4th generation - polished silver with temperature sensor, US release
- GA05557-US is 4th generation - polished obsidian with two temperature sensors, US release

T200477 and T200577 are technically the same.
T200377 and T200677 are technically the same, except for the power plug used for the USB charger.
