= Wereholme =

Historic house in New York, United States

- U.S. National Register of Historic Places
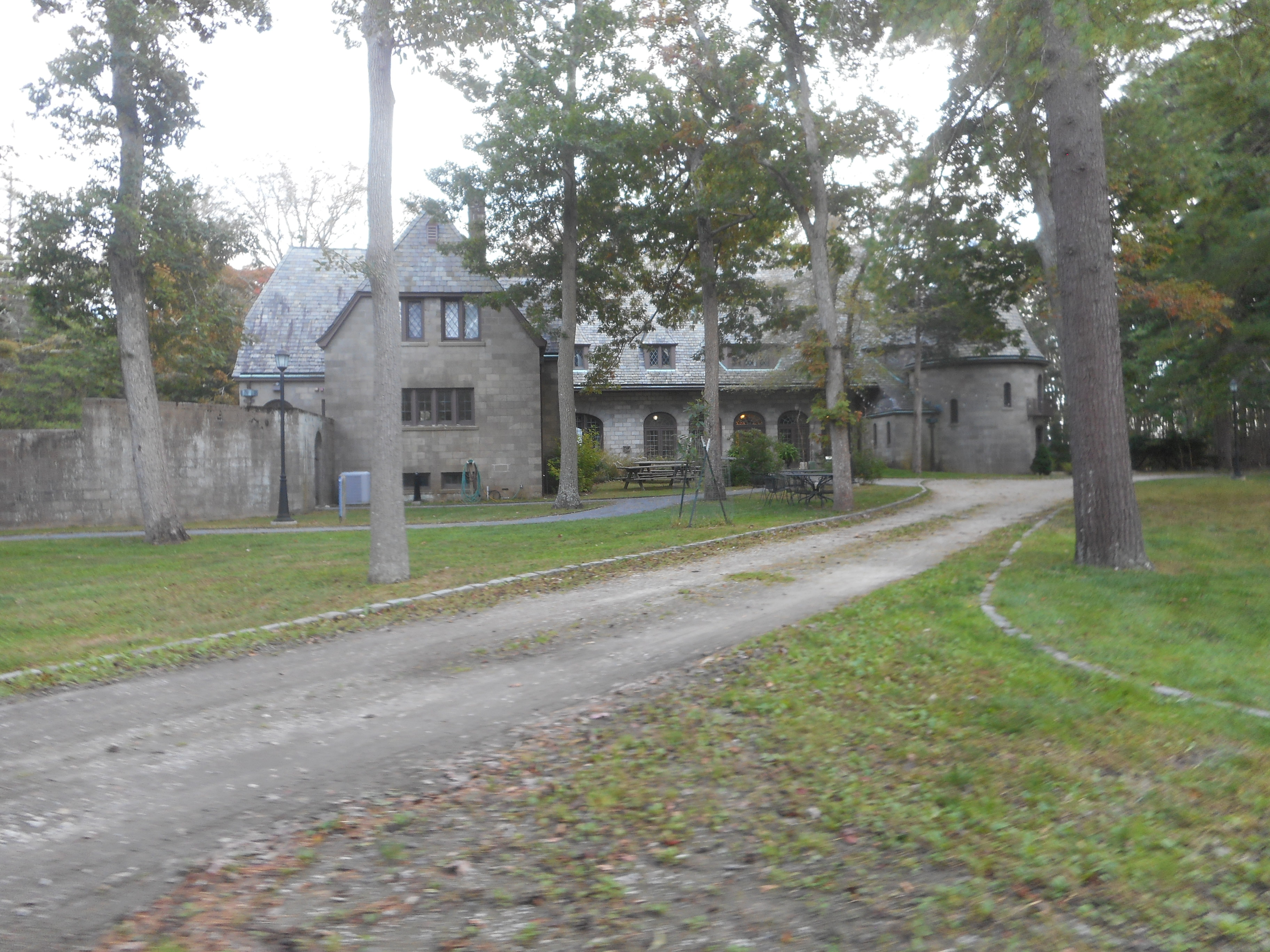
- The former Harold Weeks Estate as seen from one of the gravel parking lots.

- Location within New York Location within the United States
- Location: 550 S. Bay Ave., Islip, New York
- Coordinates: 40°42′48″N 73°12′50″W
- Area: 69.5 acres (28.1 ha)
- Architect: Atterbury, Grosvenor
- Architectural style: Exotic Revival
- NRHP reference No.: 06001208
- Added to NRHP: January 4, 2007

Wereholme, also known as the Harold H. Weekes Estate, and the Scully Estate, is a historic estate located at Islip in Suffolk County, New York. The mansion was built in 1917 in the French Provincial style for Lousine Peters and her husband Harold H. Weekes.

It was designed by architect Grosvenor Atterbury (1869–1956) and is an L-shaped structure built of concrete block. It is three stories high with a hipped roof and the servants' wing is two stories with a clipped cross-gable roof. Also on the property are two garages, greenhouse, barrel vaulted dovecote, and entrance pillars from South Bay Avenue.

== History ==
The property was originally part of Windholme which was eventually split between the children of the owners. Louise Peters received 70 acres (28 ha), and had Wereholme built. She passed the house to her daughter, Hathaway. "Happy" eventually donated it to the Audubon Society who sold it to Suffolk County in 2004.

It was added to the National Register of Historic Places in 2007.

== Suffolk County Nature Center ==
The Suffolk County Nature Center opened on the property on Earth Day, 2010. The center is operated by the Seatuck Environmental Center through a long-term custodial agreement with the Suffolk County Department of Parks, Recreation and Conservation.

Wereholme has been restored, and features natural history exhibits, a nature library and space for programs.

The 70-acre property is adjacent to the Seatuck National Wildlife Refuge and the Islip Town Beach. Trails and boardwalks allow visitors to view different ecosystems, including salt marsh, freshwater wetlands and mature upland forest.
