= Boulder Amplifiers =

Boulder Amplifiers is a private corporation founded in Boulder, Colorado in 1983 by Jeff Nelson as a manufacturer of high-end, solid state professional audio electronics.

The early, primary technology used to distinguish Boulder from other audio manufacturers was the use of the 990 discrete gain stage, based on the original work of Deane Jensen.

In subsequent years, Boulder Amplifiers has shifted its focus from studio electronics to high-end audio electronics, utilizing an updated third- and fourth-generation variant of the 990 gain stage, and is primarily known for creating products with no limits on retail price, extremely complex engineering, and chassis design which doubles as industrial art.
