= Fulton Building =

- U.S. National Register of Historic Places
- Pittsburgh Landmark – PHLF
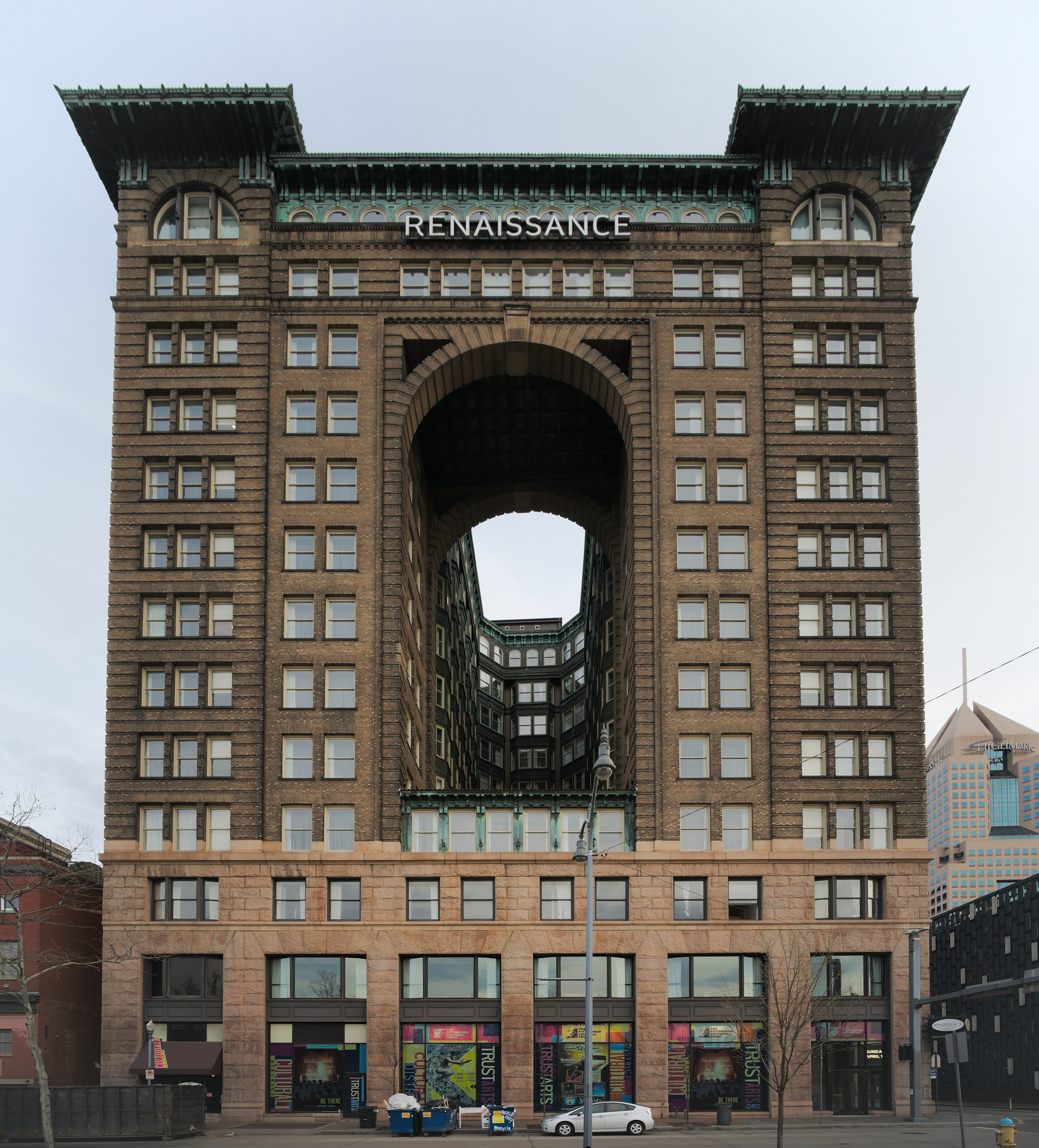

- Location within Pittsburgh Location within Pennsylvania Location within the United States
- Location: 107 Sixth St., Pittsburgh, Pennsylvania
- Coordinates: 40.4438°N 80.0023°W
- Area: less than one acre
- Built: 1906
- Architect: Grosvenor Atterbury
- Architectural style: Italian Renaissance
- NRHP reference No.: 02000556

Significant dates
- Added to NRHP: May 10, 2002
- Designated PHLF: 2003

The Fulton Building is an historic structure in Pittsburgh, Pennsylvania. Named after inventor Robert Fulton, the building was designed by architect Grosvenor Atterbury and completed in 1906. Construction was funded by industrialist Henry Phipps.

== History and features ==
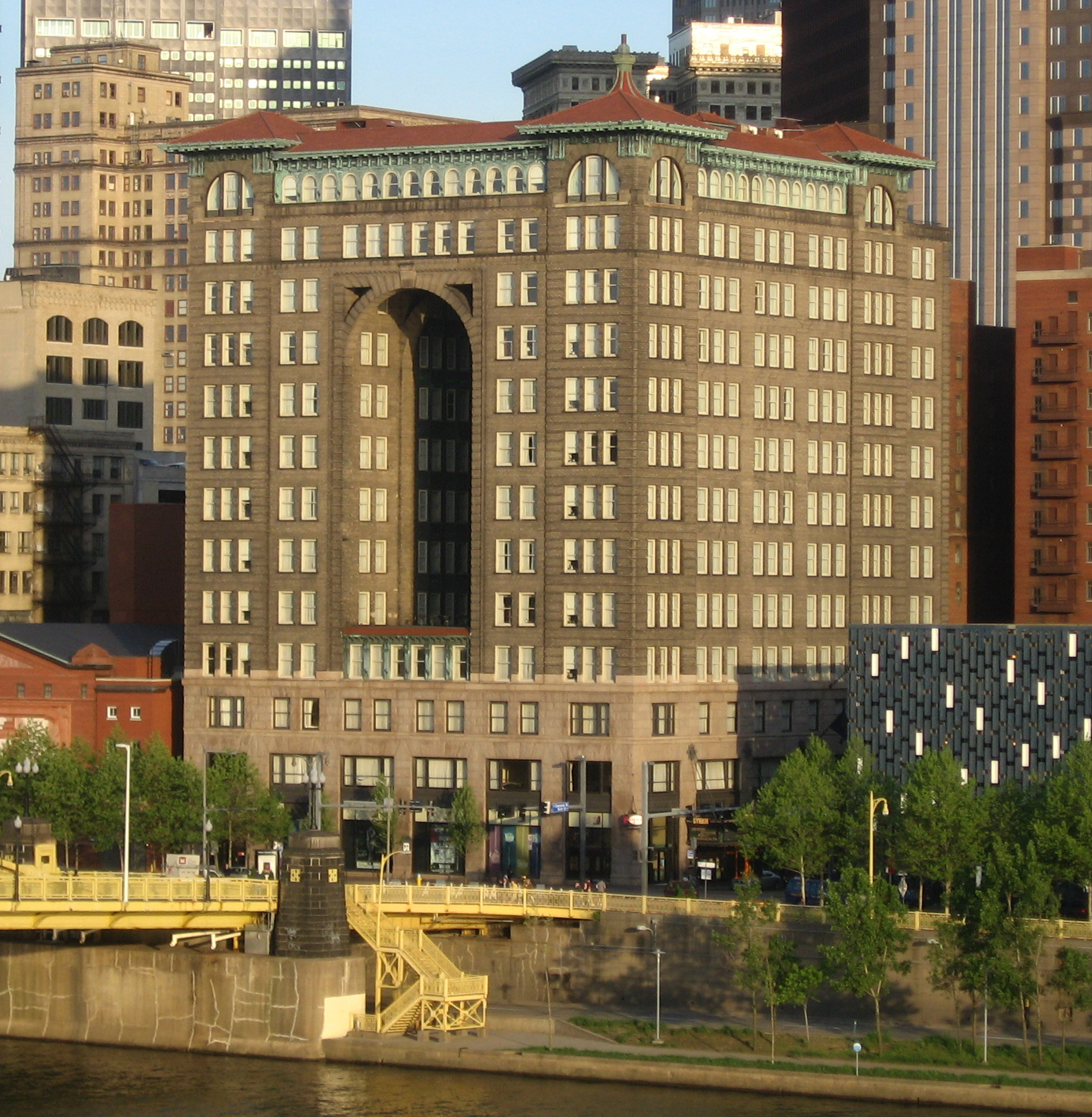
The Fulton Building as seen from across the Allegheny River

Completed in 1906, the building was designed by architect Grosvenor Atterbury. Its construction was funded by industrialist Henry Phipps. It was subsequently named after noted inventor Robert Fulton.

On May 26, 1943 the building hosted America's first night-court for gasoline war ration violators.

In 2001, it was renovated as the Renaissance Pittsburgh Hotel.

It was listed on the National Register of Historic Places in 2002.

In 2026, the hotel was renamed The Atterbury Hotel.
