= Aldus Chapin Higgins House =

Historic house in Massachusetts, United States

- U.S. National Register of Historic Places
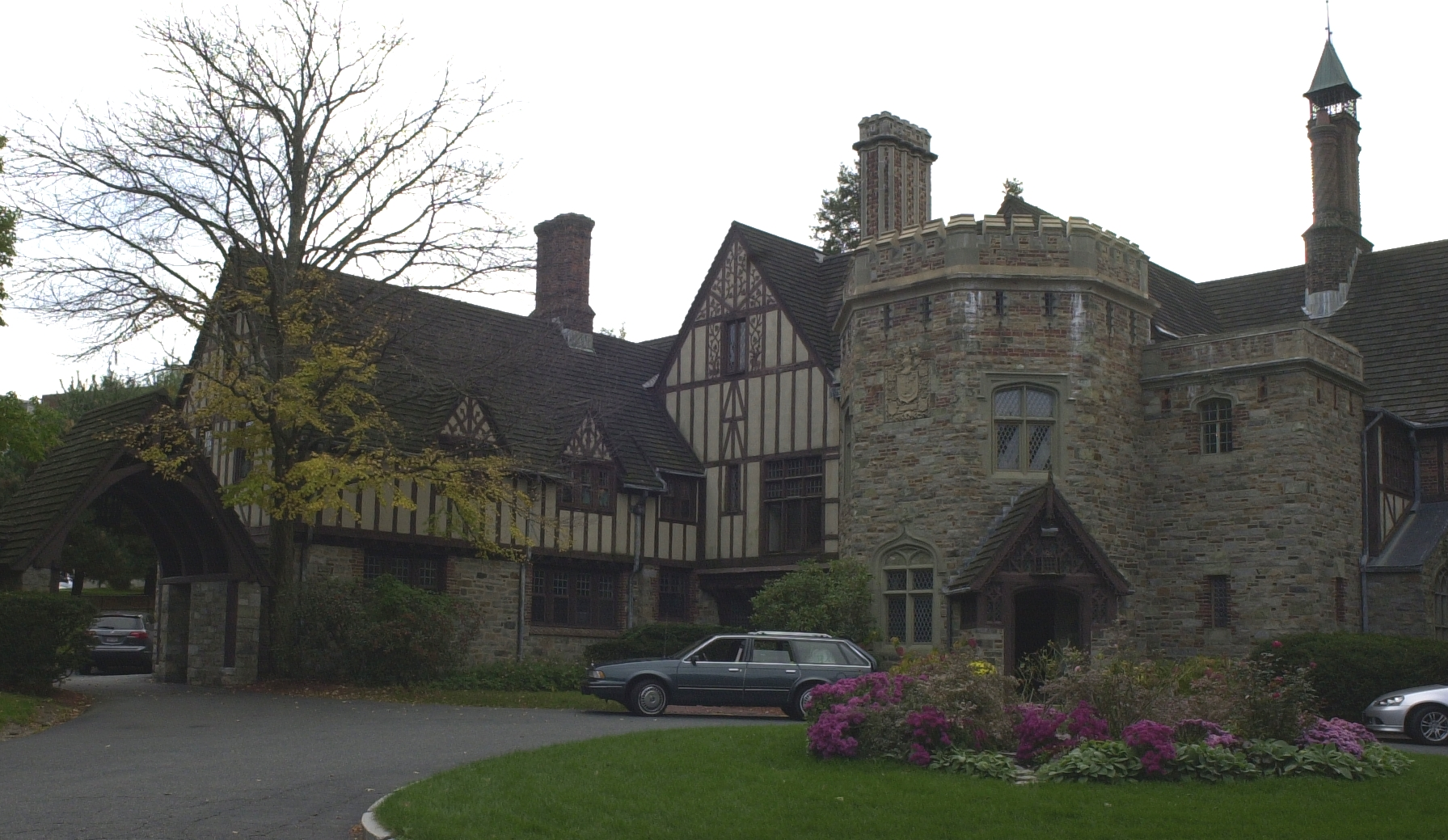

- Location within Massachusetts Location within the United States
- Location: 1 John Wing Rd., Worcester, Massachusetts
- Coordinates: 42°16′32″N 71°48′32″W
- Area: 1.25 acres (0.51 ha)
- Built: 1921
- Architect: Atterbury, Grosvenor
- Architectural style: Tudor Revival
- MPS: Worcester MRA
- NRHP reference No.: 80000496
- Added to NRHP: March 05, 1980

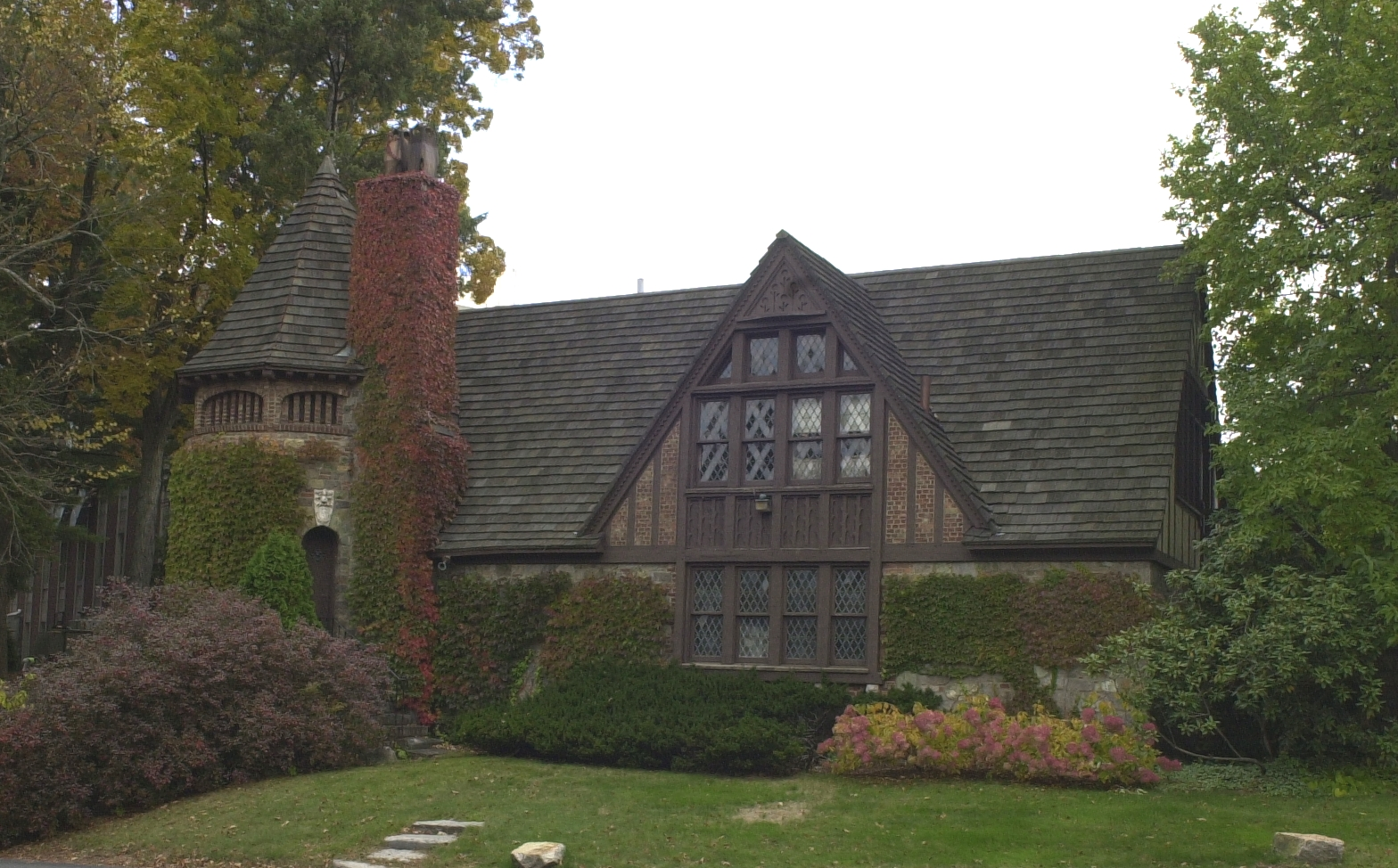

The Aldus Chapin Higgins House is a historic house at 1 John Wing Road, on the campus of the Worcester Polytechnic Institute, in Worcester, Massachusetts. Built in 1921, it is one of the city's finest examples of period Revival architecture, notably including antique elements imported from Europe. The house was listed on the National Register of Historic Places in 1980. It currently houses the college's alumni relations office and is used for special events.

== Description and history ==
The Aldus Chapin Higgins House is located northwest of downtown Worcester, on the north side of the Worcester Polytechnic Institute campus, overlooking Institute Park to the north. It is an eclectic structure 2 1/2 stories in height, with its exterior finished in stucco, brick, and stone. It consists of two roughly rectangular wings, set at right angles to each other and joined by a central octagonal entry. The octagonal tower is crowned by a crenellated battlement. The upper levels are generally finished in half-timbered stucco, in some places decorated by additional foliate carvings. Many of its leaded casement windows are antiques shipped from Europe, and the house's Great Hall has architectural features removed from an Italian monastery.

The house was designed by Grosvenor Atterbury, although Aldus Chapin Higgins, the owner, had likely made sketches and other design notes for some years before hiring Atterbury. Aldus Higgins was the son of Milton Prince Higgins, founder of the Norton Company and a leading figure in the Washburn and Moen Wire Works, a major local industry. The house was donated to the Worcester Polytechnic Institute after the death of Aldus Chapin Higgins' wife.

== See also ==
- National Register of Historic Places listings in northwestern Worcester, Massachusetts
- National Register of Historic Places listings in Worcester County, Massachusetts
