= The Boulders =

The Boulders may refer to:

- Babinda Boulders, Queensland, Australia
- The Boulders (Greencastle, Indiana), see National Register of Historic Places listings in Putnam County, Indiana
- The Boulders (Greenwood Lake, New York)
