= The Village (Hartford, Connecticut) =

- Children's Village of the Hartford Orphan Asylum
- U.S. National Register of Historic Places
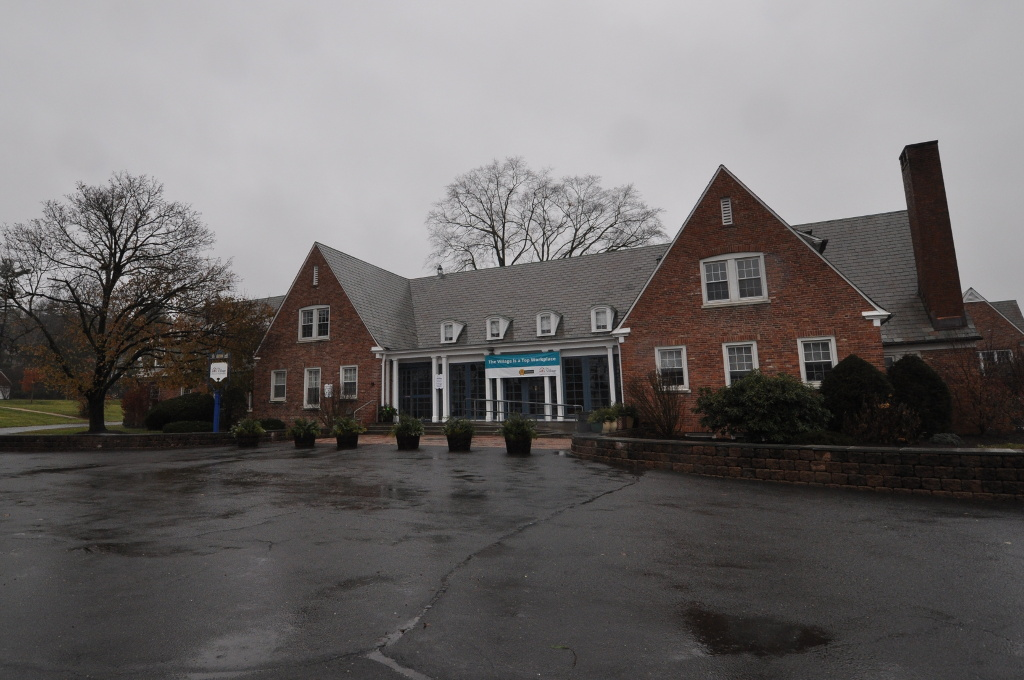

- Location within Connecticut Location within the United States
- Location: 1680 Albany Avenue, Hartford, Connecticut
- Coordinates: 41°47′11″N 72°42′37″W
- Area: 32.3 acres (13.1 ha)
- Built: 1923
- Architect: Atterbury, Grosvenor
- NRHP reference No.: 82004404
- Added to NRHP: June 28, 1982

The Village is a social service agency providing community services and resources for at-risk families and children in Hartford, Connecticut. With an organizational history dating to the early 19th century, it is one of the oldest such institutions in the state. Its architecturally distinguished campus, located 1680 Albany Avenue, is listed on the National Register of Historic Places.

== Services ==
The Village provides a broad array of services intended to support the needs of children and families. Services offered include financial and social services for at-risk families, more intensive services including outpatient and inpatient residential treatments for children with emotional and mental health issues, and adoption placement services.

== Campus ==
The Village's primary facilities are located in Northwestern Hartford, at the Junction of Albany Avenue (United States Route 44) and Bloomfield Avenue (Connecticut Route 189). Resembling an English country village, it was designed by New York architect Grosvenor Atterbury and built in the 1920s. The "cottage plan" of its layout, with multiple smaller buildings, was then a popular form for the institutional treatment of needy individuals. Although there is a similarity of design to the buildings in the complex, each one has unique and distinguishing characteristics, in a bid to give each one a more homelike feeling for its residents.

== History ==
The Village's origins are in a number of early social services organizations whose foundings were in the early 19th century. The Female Beneficent Society was founded in 1809 for the benefit of indigent girls, and the Hartford Orphan Asylum was established in 1833. These organizations merged in 1865, retaining the name "Hartford Orphan Asylum". It built a dormitory-style facility on Putnam Avenue in 1879. With the rise in popularity of the "cottage plan" for institutional housing, the organization had its current campus built in the 1920s on land donated by Reverend Francis Goodwin. Through the 20th century, the organization's mission broadened beyond the care of orphaned children to include family services, seeking to address issues caused by poverty and family breakdown.

== See also ==
- National Register of Historic Places listings in Hartford, Connecticut
