= George Bould =

English footballer (1887–1958)

Personal information
- Full name: George Bould
- Date of birth: 23 March 1887
- Place of birth: Darlaston, England
- Date of death: 1958 (aged 70–71)
- Position: Inside forward

Senior career*
Years	Team	Apps	(Gls)
1904–1905	Goldthorn Alexandra		
1905–1906	St Saviour's		
1906–1907	Penkridge		
1907–1908	Wolverhampton Wanderers	6	(1)
1908–1909	Darlaston		
1909	Bilston United		
Total		6	(1)
- * Club domestic league appearances and goals

George Bould (23 March 1887 – 1958) was an English footballer who played in the Football League for Wolverhampton Wanderers.
