= Boulder Electric Vehicle =

Defunct US electric vehicle manufacturer

- Defunct: September 2014; 11 years ago
- Headquarters: Lafayette, Colorado, United States
- Products: Electric vehicles
- Website: www.boulderev.com

Boulder Electric Vehicle was a manufacturer of electric-powered commercial vans and trucks based in Lafayette, Colorado. The company produced four CARB-certified models: an electric delivery van, a 15-passenger shuttle, a service body and a flat bed. Boulder Electric Vehicles ended production in September 2014.

== Vehicles ==
Boulder Electric Vehicles produced four vehicles and all models shared the same specs and functionality. The Boulder EVs were powered by an 80 kW electric motor, sourced from Longmont-based UQM Technologies, with three available all-electric ranges of 40 mi (64 km), 80 mi (130 km), or 120 mi (190 km). All vehicles used lithium iron phosphate (LiFePO_{4}) battery packs. The van model had a payload capacity of 4,500 lb (2,000 kg) and the truck 6,000 lb (2,700 kg). Maximum speed was 65 mph (105 km/h). The DV-500 Delivery Vehicle, the first model delivered to retail customers, was priced at US$100,000 with an 80-kWh battery pack offering a range of 120 mi (190 km).

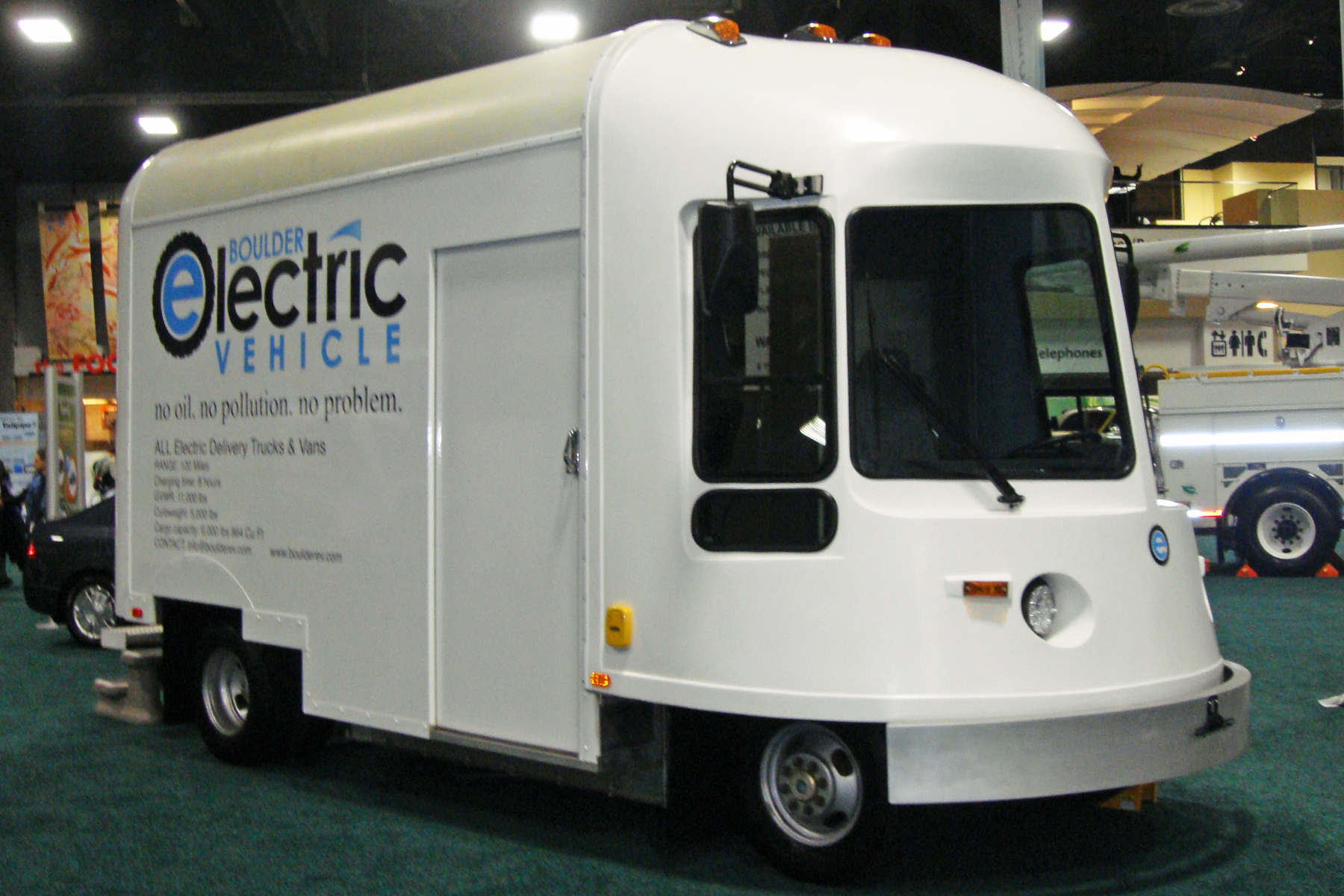
Boulder electric concept delivery van at the 2010Washington Auto Show.

Customers in the U.S. included Precision Plumbing, Heating & Cooling, which bought the first DV-500 in January 2012, FedEx, and the cities of San Antonio and Dallas, both as pilot programs, and the latter financed with a U.S. Department of Energy grant.

== See also ==
- Battery electric vehicle
- Government incentives for plug-in electric vehicles
- List of modern production plug-in electric vehicles
- Plug-in electric vehicle
