= Fred Bould =

American product designer

Fred Bould (born 1964) is an American product designer. He is the founder and owner of Bould Design, the company which designed both the thermostat and smoke alarm for Nest Labs, and the Hero3 action camera for GoPro. Bould helped to design a weather and crop data sensor for Arable Labs.
