= McLeod, Montana =

- Unincorporated community
- Location within Montana Location within the United States
- Coordinates: 45°39′46″N 110°06′58″W
- Country: United States
- State: Montana
- County: Sweet Grass
- Elevation: 4,803 ft (1,464 m)
- Time zone: UTC-7 (Mountain (MST))
  - Summer (DST): UTC-6 (MDT)
- ZIP code: 59052
- Area code: 406
- GNIS feature ID: 786978

McLeod is an unincorporated community in Sweet Grass County, Montana, United States. McLeod is located on Montana Secondary Highway 298 southwest of Big Timber.

== History ==
Located in resource-rich Boulder valley, McLeod was first established as a mining settlement, named after W.F. McLeod. The first Post Office opened in 1886 with E.E. Fowler as Postmaster. In 1916, attempts to drill an oil well on the townsite revealed geothermic heated water, and a swimming pool was opened. A post office was again established at McLeod in 1920 but has now permanently closed.

Today, McLeod is privately owned.

== Climate ==
This climatic region is typified by large seasonal temperature differences, with warm to hot (and often humid) summers and cold (sometimes severely cold) winters. According to the Köppen Climate Classification system, McLeod has a humid continental climate, abbreviated "Dfb" on climate maps.
