= The Boulders (Greenwood Lake, New York) =

Historic house in New York, United States

- U.S. National Register of Historic Places
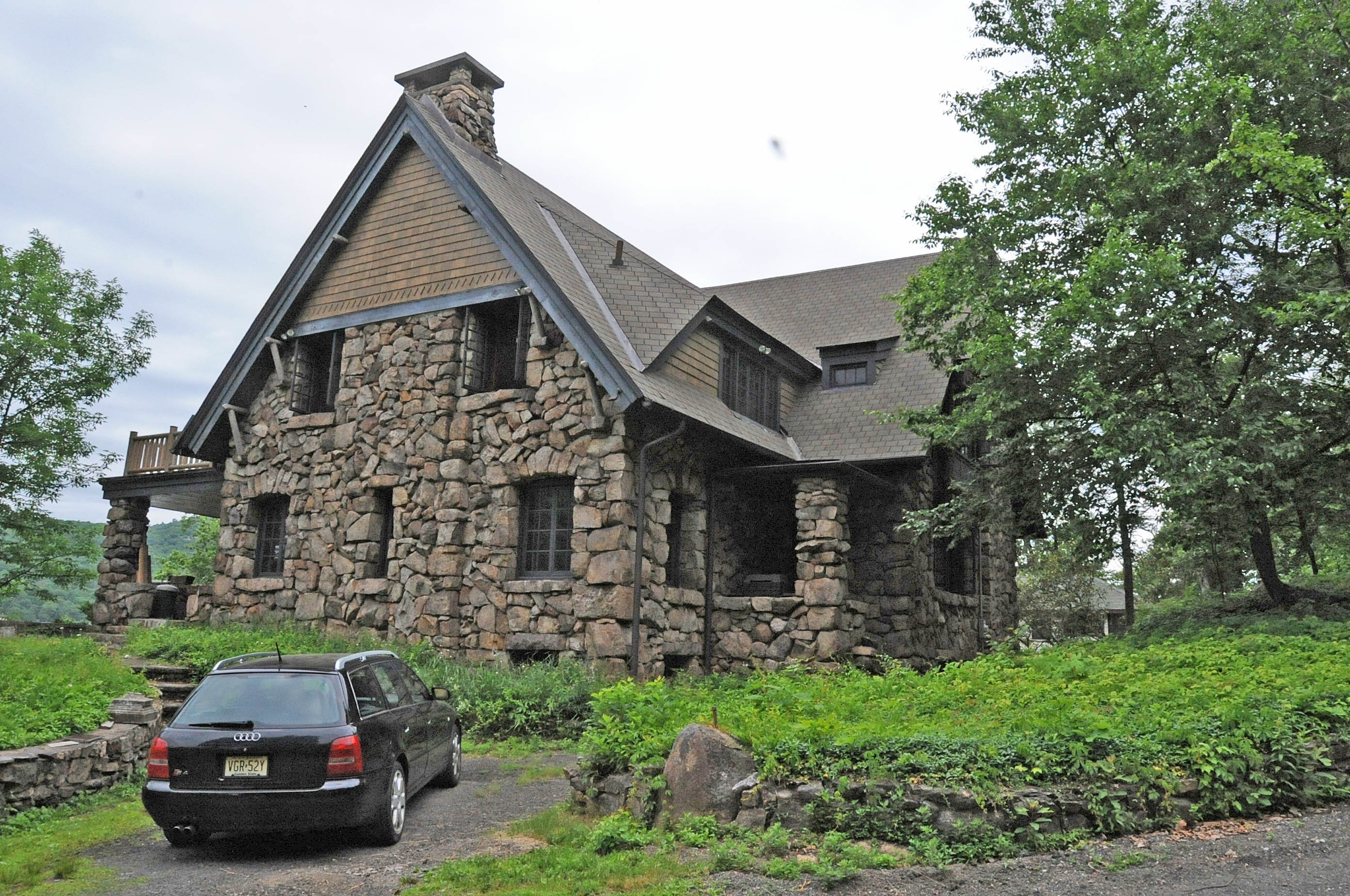

- Location within New York Location within the United States
- Location: 99 Shore Ave., Warwick, New York
- Coordinates: 41°11′18″N 74°18′46″W
- Area: 1.5 acres (0.61 ha)
- Built: 1911
- Architect: Atterbury, Grosvenor
- Architectural style: Bungalow/Craftsman
- NRHP reference No.: 01000848
- Added to NRHP: August 8, 2001

The Boulders, also known as the Homer A. Norris House, is a historic home located at Greenwood Lake in Orange County, New York. It was designed by architect Grosvenor Atterbury and built in 1911. It is a two-story, rectangular stone bungalow dwelling and features a projecting two-story gable-roofed bay.

It was listed on the National Register of Historic Places in 2001.
