= Grosvenor Atterbury =

American architect, urban planner and writer (1869–1956)

- Born: Grosvenor Atterbury; July 7, 1869; Detroit, Michigan, U.S.
- Died: October 18, 1956 (aged 87); Southampton, New York, U.S.
- Education: Columbia University; Yale University
- Occupations: Architect, Urban Planner and Writer
- Known for: Forest Hills Gardens (1909); House of the Redeemer (1916); Wereholme (1917); Aldus Chapin Higgins House (1921); Holy Trinity Rectory (1927); Rockefeller Hall (1933)
- Honors: National Academy of Design

Grosvenor Atterbury (July 7, 1869, in Detroit, MI – October 18, 1956, in Southampton, NY) was an American architect, urban planner and writer. He studied at Yale University, where he was an editor of campus humor magazine The Yale Record After travelling in Europe, he studied architecture at Columbia University and worked in the offices of McKim, Mead & White.

Much of Atterbury's early work consisted of weekend houses for wealthy industrialists. Atterbury was given the commission for the model housing community of Forest Hills Gardens, along with his associate architect, John Almy Tompkins II, which began in 1909 under the sponsorship of the Russell Sage Foundation.

For Forest Hills, Atterbury developed an innovative construction method: each house was built from approximately 170 standardized precast concrete panels, fabricated off-site and assembled by crane. The system was sophisticated even by modern standards: panels were cast with integral hollow insulation chambers; casting formwork incorporated an internal sleeve, allowing molds to be "broken" before concrete had completely set; and panels were moved to the site in only two operations (formwork to truck and truck to crane).

Atterbury's system influenced the work of mid-1920s European modern architects like Ernst May, who used panelized prefab concrete systems in a number of celebrated experimental housing projects in Frankfurt. In this way Atterbury can be considered a progenitor of the Modern Movement.

Atterbury was elected to the National Academy of Design in 1918 as an Associate member, and became a full member in 1940.

Atterbury worked on various projects with John D. Rockefeller, Jr., in the 1930s, including what today is Stone Barns Food and Agriculture Center, and the Gatehouse and Entrance Wall to Kykuit Estate, as well as the six stucco houses built for estate employees. The six houses were designed as the core of Pocantico Village that Rockefeller was building as Kykuit was being completed, and to complement the style of the Union Church and Pocantico Hills Central School, which he had completed.

== Works ==
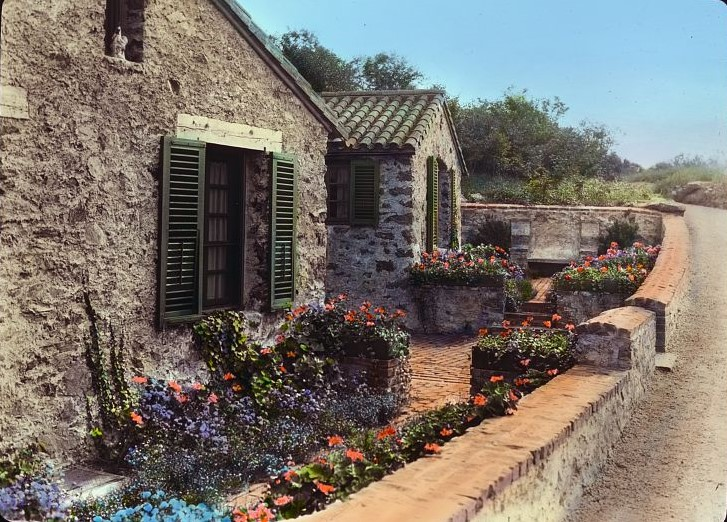
Surprise Valley Farm (1916), Arthur Curtiss James property in Newport, Rhode Island, photographed by Frances Benjamin Johnston in 1917. Architect: Grosvenor Atterbury, 1914-1916. These buildings have survived as part of the SVF Foundation founded to preserve endangered breeds of livestock.

- Parrish Art Museum in Southampton, NY. The building was commissioned by Samuel Longstreth Parrish to fellow Southampton resident, the architect Grosvenor Atterbury. It was constructed in 1897 in downtown Southampton at 25 Jobs Lane.
- Connecticut Hall restoration, New Haven, Connecticut, 1905
- Renaissance Pittsburgh Hotel (formerly Fulton Building), Pittsburgh, Pennsylvania, 1906
- Tenney Memorial Chapel, Walnut Grove Cemetery, Methuen, Massachusetts, 1906
- The Boulders, 99 Shore Ave. Greenwood Lake, New York, 1911
- The Church-in-the-Gardens, New York City, 1915
- Surprise Valley Farm, Newport, Rhode Island, 1914-1916
- Industrial village (the pottery houses) for Holston Corporation, 1915-1916
- House of the Redeemer, New York City, 1916
- Wereholme, Islip, New York, 1917
- Carriage Paths, Bridges and Gatehouses, Acadia National Park and vicinity Acadia National Park, Maine, 1919
- Aldus Chapin Higgins House, Worcester, Massachusetts, 1921
- Sage House (formerly Russell Sage Foundation Building), New York City, 1922 to 1926
- Holy Trinity Rectory, a four-storey brick rectory at 341 East 87th Street, Manhattan, 1927 (for $50,000).
- Kykuit Gate House and Entrance Wall, and Administrative Building, Pocantico Hills, New York, 1930
- Pond Mansion, Tucson, Arizona, 1930
- Stone Barns Center for Food and Agriculture, Pocantico Hills, New York, 1930-33
- Six cottages commissioned by John D. Rockefeller, Jr., for estate employees, Kykuit, Pocantico Hills, New York, 1930-33
- Rockefeller Hall, Winter Harbor, Maine, 1933, commissioned by John D. Rockefeller, Jr. and built by the National Park Service to house Navy personnel in the French Norman Revival-style.
- Children's Village of the Hartford Orphan Asylum, 1680 Albany Ave. Hartford, Connecticut
- Shore Road Historic District, Shore Rd. Cold Spring Harbor, New York

== See also ==
- Atterbury Hill, Southampton.
