= List of Worcester Polytechnic Institute people =

== Alumni ==
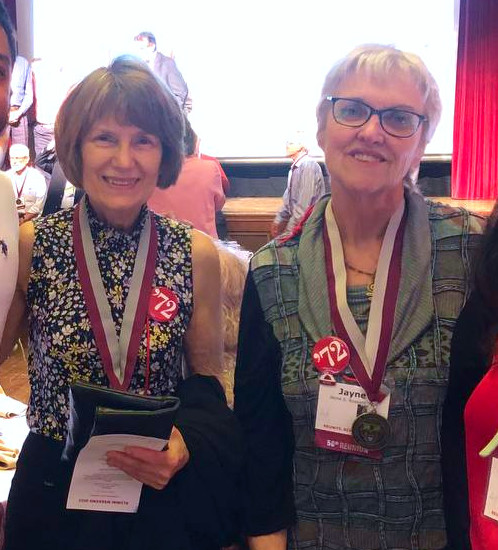
Lesley Small and Jayne Rossetti in 2022, first women enrolled at WPI (class of 1972)

- Todd Akin (Class of 1970), former member of U.S. House of Representatives representing Missouri's 2nd District; best known for his claim that victims of what he described as "legitimate rape" very rarely become pregnant
- Paul Allaire (Class of 1960), former CEO of Xerox
- Harold Stephen Black (Class of 1921), revolutionized electronics by inventing the negative feedback amplifier in 1927
- Loree Griffin Burns (Class of 1991)
- Giovanni Capriglione (Class of c. 1995), degree in physics; Republican member of the Texas House of Representatives from Tarrant County, Texas
- Curtis Carlson (Class of 1967), imaging systems researcher and former president and CEO of SRI International
- Karen Casella (Class of 1983), software engineer and advocate for inclusion in the technology industry
- John W. Geils Jr. (dropped out in 1967), founded The J. Geils Band and played lead guitar; bandmates Danny Klein and Richard "Magic Dick" Salwitz also left WPI
- David Gewirtz (Class of 1982), CNN columnist, cyberterrorism advisor, and leading presidential scholar; candidate for the 2008 Pulitzer Prize in Letters
- Robert H. Goddard (Class of 1908), widely regarded as the "father" of modern rocketry
- Eric Hahn (Class of 1980), co-founder of Collabra Software (sold to Netscape) and Lookout Software (sold to Microsoft); in 1997 became CTO of Netscape
- Elwood Haynes (Class of 1881), early alumnus, prominent chemist and inventor; credited for aiding in the development of the automobile and the creation of stainless steel
- Aldus Chapin Higgins (Class of 1893), Worcester, Massachusetts lawyer, businessman who invented a water-cooled electric furnace for the Norton Companies
- John Woodman Higgins (Class of 1896), founder of Worcester Pressed Steel Company and the Higgins Armory Museum
- Jeremy Hitchcock (Class of 2004), co-founder and former CEO of Dyn
- William Hobbs (Class of 1883), 19th-century geologist
- Dan Itse (Class of 1980, 1986), engineer, inventor, member of the New Hampshire House of Representatives
- Lawrence C. Jones (Class of 1915), Vermont attorney general
- Dean Kamen (dropped out in 1976), invented the first portable insulin pump; started DEKA, the company that invented the Segway Human Transporter and iBOT powered wheelchair; co-founded the international youth organization FIRST
- Atwater Kent (dropped out in 1895 and 1896), founded the Atwater Kent Manufacturing Company, which was the world's leading producer of radios in the late 1920s (there is now a building on campus called the Atwater Kent Laboratories)
- Everett J. Lake (Class of 1890), representative, Connecticut General Assembly, 1903–1905; senator, Connecticut General Assembly, 1905–1907; lieutenant governor, 1907–1909, and governor, 1921–1923, of Connecticut
- Robert Lanou (Class of 1952), physicist
- William Stevens Lawton (transferred out in 1918), United States Army lieutenant general, attended 1917–1918, transferred to the United States Military Academy; Army comptroller
- Frank Edward Lowe (Class of 1908), U.S. Army major general, trusted advisor to U.S. President Harry Truman during the Korean War; acted as Truman's "eyes and ears" in Korea
- Joseph Mancuso (Class of 1963), WPI's youngest department chairman; best-selling author in the business genre; founder, president, and CEO of CEO Clubs International
- Dwight Marcus, chief technology officer and co-founder
- Yiqi Mei (Class of 1914), president of Tsinghua University, founder of its college of engineering
- Eric Mill (Class of 2005), executive director for Cloud Strategy of the U.S. General Services Administration's Federal Acquisition Service
- Alan R. Pearlman (Class of 1948), founder of ARP Instruments and inventor of the ARP synthesizer
- Don Peterson (Class of 1971), former CFO of Lucent Technologies, founder and former CEO/ chairman of Avaya
- Nancy Pimental (Class of 1987), chemical engineering degree, one of the writers of South Park and the movie The Sweetest Thing; replaced Jimmy Kimmel as co-host of Win Ben Stein's Money, alumna of Phi Sigma Sigma
- Daniel Robbins (dropped out), founder and former chief architect of the Gentoo Linux project
- Andy Ross (Mass Academy Class of 1997), guitarist, keyboardist and vocalist for the rock band OK Go since 2005, spent a year at WPI as part of the Mass Academy program
- Naveen Selvadurai (Class of 2002), co-founder of Foursquare
- Kotaro Shimomura (Class of 1888), chemical engineer; president of Doshisha University and Osaka Gas Co., Ltd in Japan
- James Smith (Class of 1906), engineer, entrepreneur, educator, and businessman; co-founder and president of the National Radio Institute
- Chartsiri Sophonpanich (Class of 1980), president and director of Bangkok Bank, the largest commercial bank in Thailand
- Robert Stempel (Class of 1955), inventor of the catalytic converter, former chairman and CEO of General Motors
- Helen Guillette Vassallo, scientific researcher and educator, noted for her contributions to the fields of physiology, pharmacology, and anesthesia
- Gilbert Vernam (Class of 1914), credited with the inauguration of modern cryptography
- Richard T. Whitcomb (Class of 1943), aeronautical engineer responsible for the "area rule" of high-speed aircraft design, the supercritical airfoil, and winglets
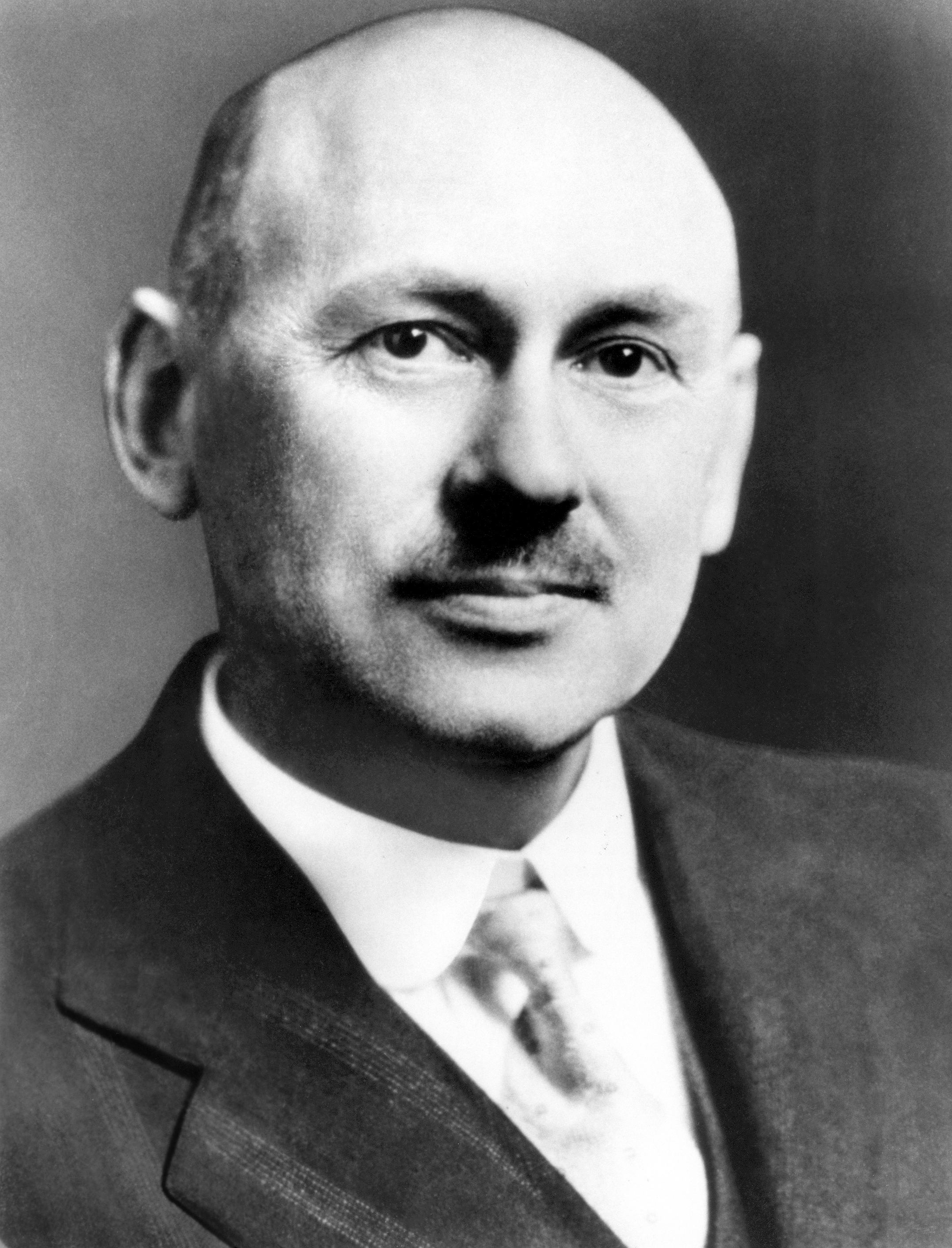
Robert H. Goddard

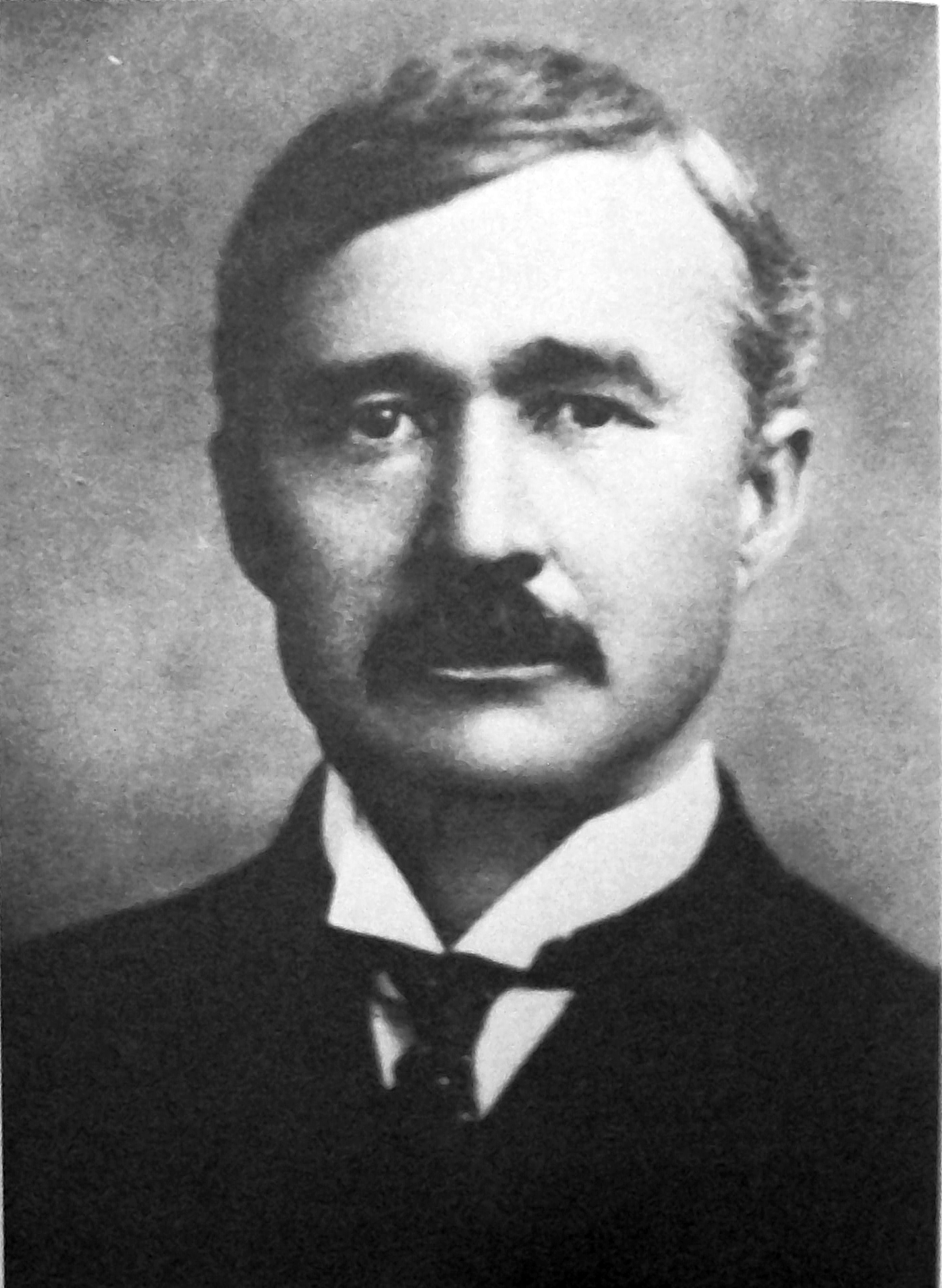
Elwood P. Haynes

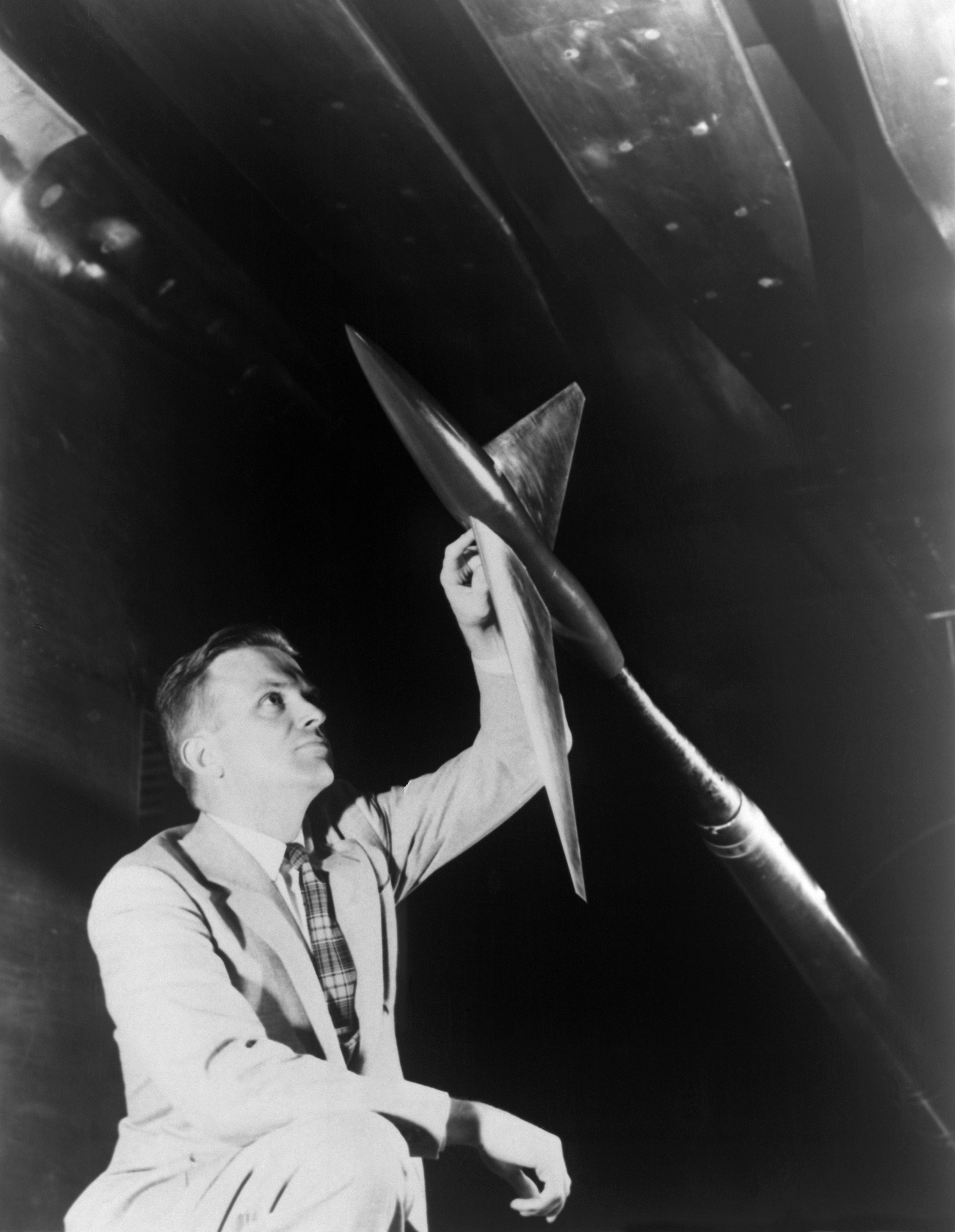
Richard T. Whitcomb

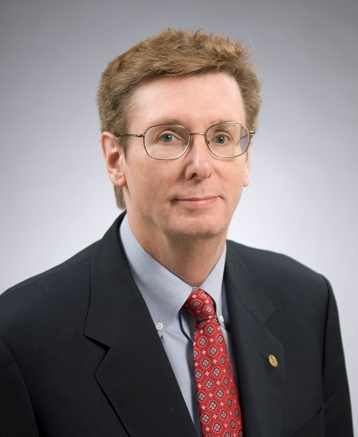
Curtis R. Carlson

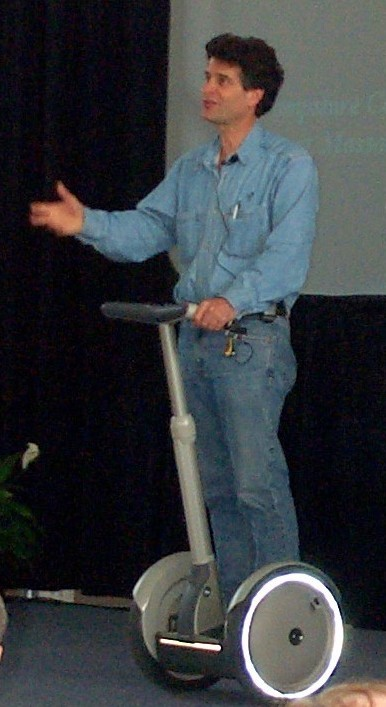
Dean Kamen

Gilbert Vernam

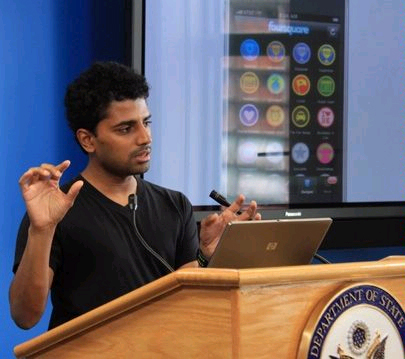
Naveen Selvadurai

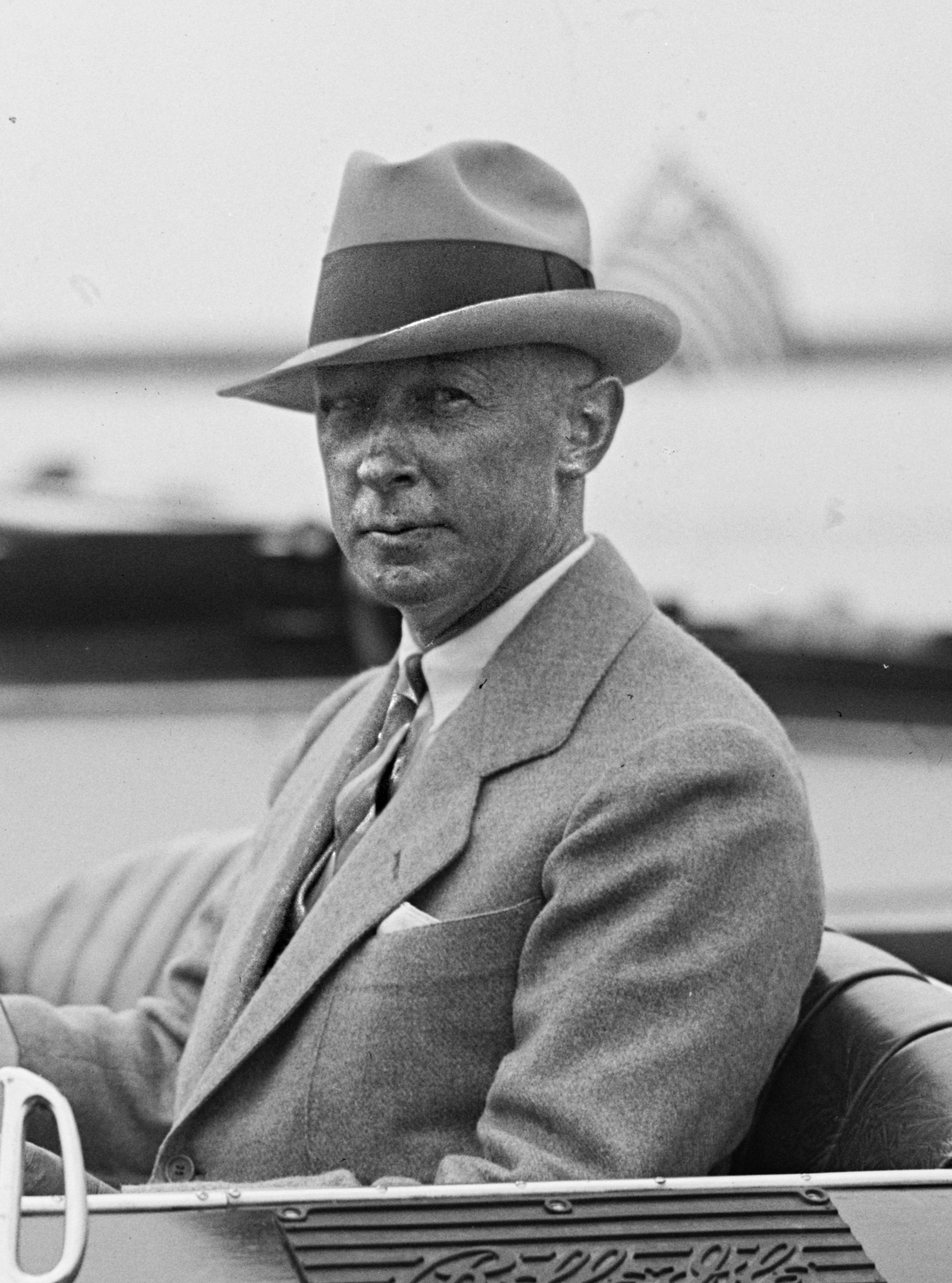
A. Atwater Kent

== Faculty ==
WPI has employed several professors whose achievements have made them notable across the nation and the world.

- David Adams, biology professor, in 1995 was the first to create a mouse which suffered from Alzheimers
- Frederick Bianchi, director of Music Technology and co-inventor of the Virtual Orchestra
- Joseph Mancuso (class of 1963), became WPI's youngest department chairman when he took over the WPI management program after earning an MBA from Harvard; best-selling author in the business genre; founder, president, and CEO of CEO Clubs International
- Brian Moriarty, professor of interactive media and game development; former game developer for Infocom and LucasArts
- Kaveh Pahlavan, professor of electrical and computer engineering; director of the Center for Wireless Information Network Studies,;during the 1990s, helped develop the 802.11 wireless protocols
- Albert Sacco Jr., astronaut, former professor of chemical engineering and department head; payload specialist on the STS-73 mission in 1995
- Mimi Sheller, dean of the Global School and theorist of mobilities
- Michael Sokal, former history of science and technology professor; current president of the History of Science Society

== Presidents ==
The following persons have served as the president of Worcester Polytechnic Institute since 1868:

| No. | Image | Name | Term start | Term end | Refs. |
|---|---|---|---|---|---|
| 1 | | Charles O. Thompson | 1868 | 1882 | |
| 2 | | Homer T. Fuller | 1883 | 1894 | |
| 3 | | Thomas C. Mendenhall | 1894 | 1901 | |
| 4 | | Edmund A. Engler | 1901 | 1911 | |
| 5 | | Ira N. Hollis | 1913 | 1925 | |
| 6 | | Ralph Earle | 1925 | February 13, 1939 (Note: Died in office.) | |
| acting | | Francis W. Roys | February 14, 1939 | August 1939 | |
| 7 | | Wat Tyler Cluverius Jr. | August 1939 | October 28, 1952 | |
| 8 | | Alvin E. Cormeny | 1953 | 1954 | |
| 9 | | Arthur B. Bronwell | 1955 | 1962 | |
| 10 | | Harry P. Storke | October 1962 | 1969 | |
| 11 | | George W. Hazzard | 1969 | 1978 | |
| 12 | | Edmund T. Cranch | 1978 | 1985 | |
| 13 | | Jon C. Strauss | 1985 | 1994 | |
| 14 | | Edward Alton Parrish | 1995 | 2004 | |
| 15 | | Dennis D. Berkey | July 1, 2004 | May 31, 2013 | |
| interim | | Philip B. Ryan | June 1, 2013 | May 31, 2014 | |
| 16 | | Laurie A. Leshin | June 1, 2014 | May 15, 2022 | |
| Interim | | Winston Wole Soboyejo | May 16, 2022 | April 3, 2023 | |
| 17 | | Grace Wang | April 3, 2023 | present | |

Table notes:
