= Grace Wang (academic administrator) =

Chinese-American academic administrator

- 王劲柳

17th President of Worcester Polytechnic Institute
- Incumbent
- Assumed office April 2023
- Preceded by: Laurie Leshin (16th) Winston "Wole" Soboyejo (interim)

Personal details
- Education: Beijing University of Chemical Technology (BS, MS); Northwestern University (PhD)

Jinliu "Grace" Wang (Chinese: 王劲柳) is a Chinese-American materials scientist and academic administrator who has served since 2023 as President of Worcester Polytechnic Institute. Prior to her time as the president of WPI, Wang was an academic within the State University of New York system and the Ohio State University.

== Early life and education ==
In her childhood, Wang was fascinated by the periodic table of elements. She earned a BS and MS degree in polymer materials from the Beijing University of Chemical Technology in China, followed by a PhD in materials science and engineering from Northwestern University. Her doctorate was awarded in 2001.

== Career ==
Before her career in academia, Wang worked for IBM and Hitachi Global Storage Technologies developing thin-film magnetic recording media and carbon overcoat for data storage. She joined the National Science Foundation (NSF) in 2009 as a program director and received successive promotions, ending her stint there as Acting Assistant Director for Engineering. At the NSF, she managed an engineering and technology funding portfolio of roughly 900 million dollars, and promoted the creation of pipelines for disadvantaged or underrepresented individuals to participate in science and engineering occupations.

Wang was appointed Vice Chancellor for Research and Economic Development within the State University of New York (SUNY), starting in January 2017. In September 2017, she was named the university system's interim provost, a role which she held alongside her vice chancellorship for one academic year. Effective July 2018, Wang became the interim president of the SUNY Polytechnic Institute. She succeeded Bahgat Sammakia as the interim president, who himself was the successor to president Alain Kaloyeros. During her time in the SUNY system, Wang also taught as a professor in the Department of Materials Design and Innovation at the University at Buffalo. She served in her SUNY roles until 2020. Tod Laursen succeeded Wang as SUNY Poly's interim president.

In 2020, Wang joined the Ohio State University as the executive vice president for research, innovation and knowledge enterprise, a role in which she administered research infrastructure and the university's strategic plan for research. Her departure from Ohio State was announced in November 2022.

On November 7, 2022, it was announced that Wang would be the 17th president of Worcester Polytechnic Institute, starting her tenure in April 2023. She succeeds 16th president Laurie Leshin and interim Winston "Wole" Soboyejo, and is the first person of color to serve as the university's non-interim president. Wang was ceremonially inaugurated as president by the university on March 22, 2024; Terrence Sejnowski delivered the inauguration's keynote address.

Under Wang's leadership, WPI has launched several key initiatives to enhance its academic and research profile. WPI teamed up with regional partners to establish a $5.2 million bio-industrial manufacturing tech hub as part of a larger Massachusetts initiative to strengthen regional innovation ecosystems. WPI also expanded its program offerings, introducing new degree programs focused on artificial intelligence, data analytics, cybersecurity, and financial technology (FinTech). A major milestone came in February 2025, when WPI achieved Carnegie Classification as an R1 research university, the highest tier for research activity.

Since 2023, Wang has served on the board of directors for For Inspiration and Recognition of Science and Technology (FIRST; the organization behind the FIRST Robotics Competition). Since at least 2023, Wang has been a member of the Government–University–Industry–Philanthropy Research Roundtable at the National Academies of Sciences, Engineering, and Medicine. She has also served as a board member of the New York Academy of Sciences since 2024. The National Academy of Inventors elected Wang to their 2024 class of academy fellows.

== Personal life ==
In a 2023 interview, Wang shared that she enjoys reading about science and technology as well as British literature and American presidential history.

Academic offices
Preceded by Laurie Leshin (16th) Winston "Wole" Soboyejo (interim)	17th President of Worcester Polytechnic Institute; April 2023 – present	Incumbent
