= CNSE =

CNSE and related terms may refer to:

- Canadian National Stock Exchange
- College of Nanoscale Science and Engineering
- Post-nominal letters used by a chartered member of the Nigerian Society of Engineers
- CnsE, an enzyme involved in the biological production of Communesin B
- CnSe, the chemical compound copernicium selenide
