= Penicillium buchwaldii =

Scientific classification
- Kingdom: Fungi
- Division: Ascomycota
- Class: Eurotiomycetes
- Order: Eurotiales
- Family: Aspergillaceae
- Genus: Penicillium
- Species: P. buchwaldii

Binomial name
- Penicillium buchwaldii Frisvad & Samson 2012

Type strain
- CBS 117181, CCFC007721, DAOM 214805, IBT 6005, IMI 304286

Species of fungus

Penicillium buchwaldii is a fungus species of the genus of Penicillium which produces asperphenamate, citreoisocoumarin, communesin A, communesin B, asperentin and 5'-hydroxy-asperentin

== See also ==
- List of Penicillium species
