= Bahgat G. Sammakia =

American academic

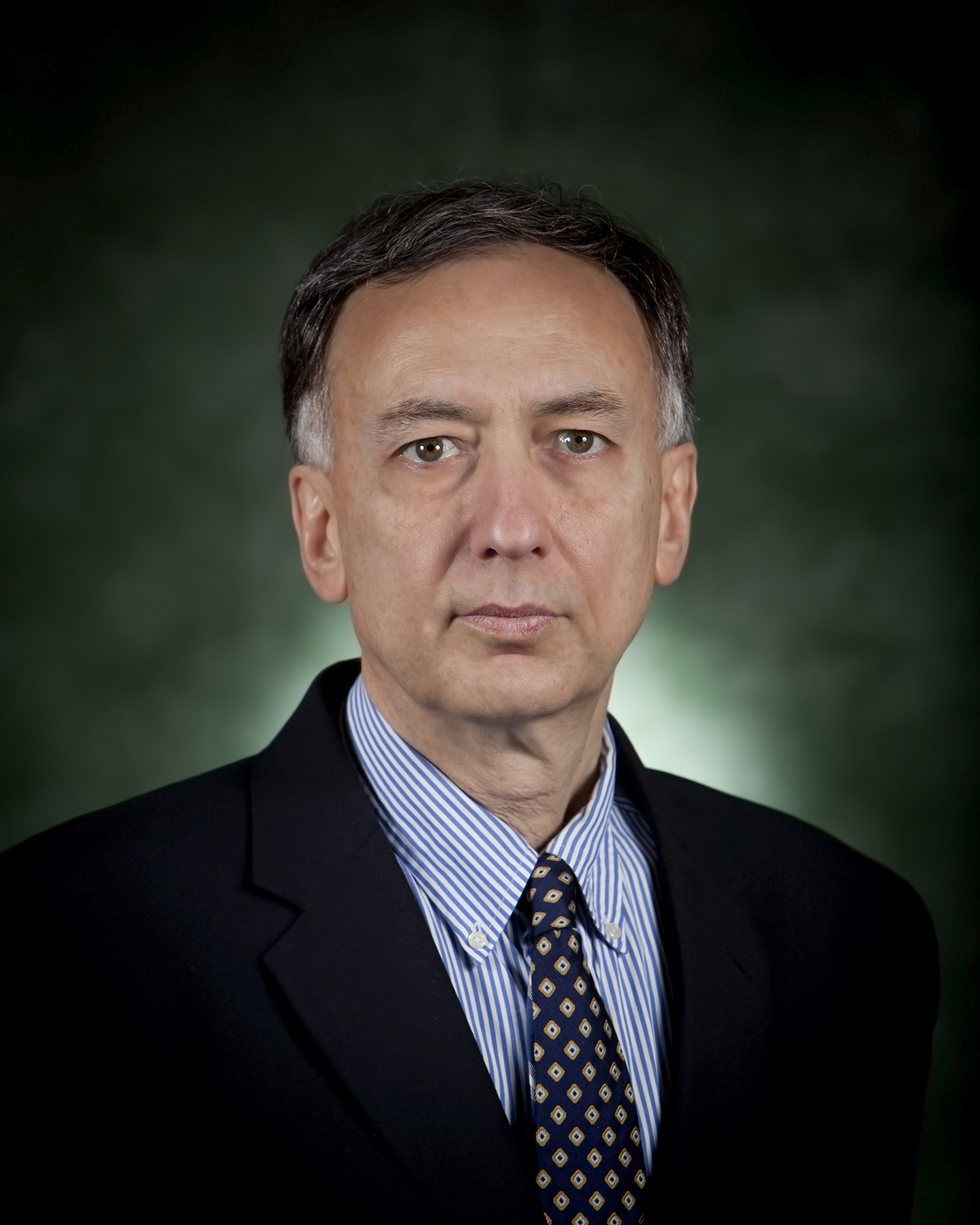

2nd President and Chief Executive Officer of the SUNY Polytechnic Institute
- In office November 3, 2016 – June 30, 2018
- Preceded by: Alain E. Kaloyeros
- Succeeded by: Grace Wang (Interim)

Personal details
- Education: University of Alexandria (BS); University at Buffalo (MS, PhD)
- Profession: Mechanical engineering

Bahgat G. Sammakia is an Egyptian-American mechanical engineer, and a Distinguished Professor of Mechanical Engineering at Binghamton University. He served as Vice President for Research at Binghamton University from 2011 to 2025. He was previously the Interim President of the SUNY Polytechnic Institute. He is also a professor of mechanical engineering and director of the Small Scale Systems Packaging Center at Binghamton University in Binghamton, New York. Sammakia has published over 350 technical papers in refereed journals and conference proceedings, holds 40 U.S. patents and 12 IBM technical disclosures. He has also contributed to several books.

In June 2018, State University of New York senior vice chancellor for research and economic development, Dr. Grace Wang was appointed as SUNY Polytechnic Institute Interim President. She replaced Sammakia on July 1 and earns a salary of $425,000, while continuing to hold her position at SUNY.

== Education and career ==
Sammakia received his B.S. degree in 1977 from the University of Alexandria. He received his M.S. and Ph.D. degrees in 1980 and 1982, respectively from the State University of New York at Buffalo. All of his degrees are in mechanical engineering. The title of his doctoral dissertation is "Transient natural and mixed convection flows and transport adjacent to an ice surface melting in saline water".

After completing his Ph.D., Sammakia was a postdoctoral fellow at the University of Pennsylvania. He began working for IBM in 1984 as an engineer. He continued to work for IBM until 1998, holding various management positions during that time. Some of the groups that he managed at IBM include the thermal and mechanical analysis groups, the surface science group, the chemical lab, and the site technical assurance group. Sammakia is a Fellow of the ASME, the IEEE and the National Academy of Inventors. Sammakia won the ASME Heat Transfer Memorial Award in 2020 He was honored by the Chancellor of the State University of New York in 2002 for research excellence. Sammakia has advised over 40 PhD students and 25 Masters students.

Sammakia was the editor of the Journal of Electronics Packaging, which is published by the American Society of Mechanical Engineers.

== Publications ==
- Benjamin Gebhart; Yogesh Jaluria; Roop L. Mahajan; Bahgat Sammakia (1988). Buoyancy Induced Flows and Transport. Hemisphere. ISBN 0-89116-402-2.
- Arunasalam, Parthiban; Ackler, Harold D.; Sammakia, Bahgat G. (Jul–Aug 2006). "Microfabrication of ultrahigh density wafer-level thin film compliant interconnects for through-silicon-via based chip stacks". Journal of Vacuum Science and Technology B. 24 (4): 1780–1784. Bibcode:2006JVSTB..24.1780A. doi:10.1116/1.2210003.
- Desai, Anand; Geer, James; Sammakia, Bahgat (March 2006). "Models of steady heat conduction in multiple cylindrical domains". Journal of Electronic Packaging. 128 (1): 10–17. doi:10.1115/1.2159003.
- Desai, Anand; Mahajan, Sanket; Subbarayan, Ganesh; Jones, Wayne; Geer, James; Sammakia, Bahgat (March 2006). "A numerical study of transport in a thermal interface material enhanced with carbon nanotubes". Journal of Electronic Packaging. 128 (1): 92–97. doi:10.1115/1.2161231.
- Watson, S.P.; Murray, B.T.; Sammakia, B.G. (June 2001). "Computational parameter study of chip scale package array cooling". IEEE Transactions on Components and Packaging Technologies. 24 (2): 184–190. doi:10.1109/6144.926381.
- Sathe, Sanjeev B.; Sammakia, Bahgat G. (June 2000). "A numerical study of the thermal performance of a tape ball grid array (TBGA) package". Journal of Electronic Packaging. 122 (2): 107–114. doi:10.1115/1.483141.
- Tyan-Min Niu; Sammakia, B.G.; Sathe, S. (December 1999). "Void-effect modeling of flip-chip encapsulation on ceramic substrate". IEEE Transactions on Components and Packaging Technologies. 22 (4): 484–487. doi:10.1109/6144.814962.
- Tran, S.K.; Questad, D.L.; Sammakia, B.G. (December 1999). "Adhesion issues in flip-chip on organic modules". IEEE Transactions on Components and Packaging Technologies. 22 (4): 519–524. doi:10.1109/6144.814967.
- Sathe, S.; Sammakia, B. (November 1998). "A review of recent developments in some practical aspects of air-cooled electronic packages". Journal of Heat Transfer. 120 (4): 830–839. doi:10.1115/1.2825902.
