= EWI =

EWI may refer to:

- EastWest Institute, a former American think tank
- Edison Welding Institute, nonprofit engineering and technology organization in Ohio, United States
- Electronic wind instrument, an electronic musical instrument
- The IATA code for Enarotali Airport, Central Papua, Indonesia
- Expert Witness Institute, a nonprofit legal organization in Great Britain
- External wall insulation, an insulated, protective, and decorative exterior cladding for buildings
