= Winston Wole Soboyejo =

American Scientist of Yoruba Nigerian parentage

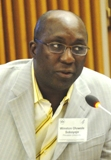
- Soboyejo in 2008

7th President of SUNY Polytechnic Institute
- Incumbent
- Assumed office October 2, 2023
- Preceded by: Andrew L. Russell (interim); Alain E. Kaloyeros

President of Worcester Polytechnic Institute
- Interim
- In office May 16, 2022 – April 3, 2023
- Preceded by: Laurie Leshin
- Succeeded by: Grace Wang

Personal details
- Born: 1964 (age 60–61); Palo Alto, California, U.S.
- Education: King's College London (BSc); Churchill College, Cambridge (PhD)
- Scientific career
- Fields: Materials science
- Institutions: Massachusetts Institute of Technology; Ohio State University; Edison Welding Institute; McDonnell Douglas; Princeton University; Worcester Polytechnic Institute; SUNY Polytechnic Institute
- Thesis: The Propagation of Defects Under Fatigue Loading (1988)
- Doctoral advisor: John F. Knott

Winston Wole Soboyejo is an American materials scientist of Yoruba Nigerian parentage. His research focuses on biomaterials and the use of nanoparticles for the detection and treatment of disease, the mechanical properties of materials, and the use of materials science to promote global development. He was appointed President at SUNY Polytechnic Institute and began his service on October 2, 2023.

== Early life and education ==
Wole was born in Palo Alto, California, in 1964. He moved to Nigeria with his family in 1965. Wole is the son of Professor Alfred Sobojeyo of the Ohio State University and Anthonia Soboyejo. He was educated at King's College London (BSc, Mechanical Engineering, 1985) and Churchill College, Cambridge (PhD, Materials Science and Metallurgy, 1988).

== Career ==
Wole returned to the United States in 1988 to become a research scientist at The McDonnell Douglas Research Labs in St. Louis, MO. In 1992, he worked briefly as a Principal Research Engineer at the Edison Welding Institute before joining the engineering faculty of The Ohio State University in Columbus, OH. From 1997 to 1998, he was a visiting professor in the departments of mechanical engineering and materials science and engineering at Massachusetts Institute of Technology. He served as a member of the Scientific Advisory Board of the Secretary General of the United Nations from 2014 to 2016. Dr. Soboyejo moved to Princeton University in 1999 where he served as a professor of mechanical and aerospace engineering and a professor in the Princeton Institute of Science and Technology of Materials (PRISM).

He also served as the director of the U.S./Africa Materials Institute (USAMI), one of six international materials institutes supported by the National Science Foundation, and the Director of the Materials Undergraduate Research Program in PRISM.

Between 2012 and 2014, Soboyejo served as president and provost of the African University of Science and Technology (AUST) in Abuja, Nigeria. AUST is a Pan-African university founded by the Nelson Mandela Institutions (NMI). Soboyejo has also served as the chair of the African Scientific Committee of the NMI. In September 2016, Wole joined the faculty and administration at Worcester Polytechnic Institute (WPI) where he served as the Bernard M. Gordon Dean of Engineering and Professor of Engineering Leadership, prior to being named Senior Vice President and Provost.

His research focuses on materials for health, energy and the environment. His current projects include the use of nanomaterials for targeting and treating cancer; a shear assay technique that may be able to measure the mechanical properties of organelles in the cell; the development of low cost solar cells/light emitting devices; and sustainable approaches to providing clean water, affordable housing and education to people in the developing world.

In 2021, he was elected a member of the National Academy of Engineering for contributions to understanding dynamic behavior of materials and for leadership in STEM outreach in Africa.
