= College of Nanotechnology, Science, and Engineering =

College of SUNY Albany

College of Nanotechnology, Science, and Engineering (CNSE)
- Type: College
- Established: 2004
- Parent institution: University at Albany, SUNY
- Endowment: $6.1 million
- Dean: Michele J Grimm
- Location: Albany, New York; 42°41′28.37″N 73°49′58.28″W
- Website: www.albany.edu/cnse

The College of Nanotechnology, Science, and Engineering is part of the University at Albany, SUNY in Albany, New York. Founded in 2004 at the University at Albany, SUNY, the college underwent rapid expansion in the late-2000s and early-2010s before merging with the SUNY Institute of Technology in 2014. The college rejoined the University at Albany in 2023. The college was the first college in the United States devoted to nanotechnology.

== History ==
The College of Nanoscale Science and Engineering was originally established as the School of Nanosciences and Nanoengineering at the University at Albany in 2001 (part of the College of Arts and Sciences). CNSE was accredited as the College of Nanoscale Science and Engineering of the University at Albany in 2004, and in December of that year, awarded its first Ph.D. degrees in nanoscience.

In July 2013, SUNY's Board of Trustees approved a memorandum that led to the separation of CNSE from the University at Albany and included the creation of a new degree-granting structure for the NanoCollege. This was followed by the merger of the SUNY Institute of Technology (SUNYIT) with CNSE in September 2014 to create SUNY Polytechnic Institute. In January 2015, Dr. Alain Kaloyeros was appointed by the SUNY Board of Trustees as the President of SUNY Poly. In September 2016, Kaloyeros was charged with felony bid rigging and removed as the Institute's President.

In December 2022, the SUNY Board of Trustees charged UAlbany and SUNY Poly with returning the affiliation of the College of Nanoscale Science and Engineering to the University at Albany. The reunification officially occurred on August 3, with the College of Nanoscale Science and Engineering combining with UAlbany's College of Engineering and Applied Sciences to form the College of Nanotechnology, Science, and Engineering. The faculty and students of the former College of Nanoscale Science and Engineering became the Department of Nanoscale Science & Engineering in the new College.

== Academics ==
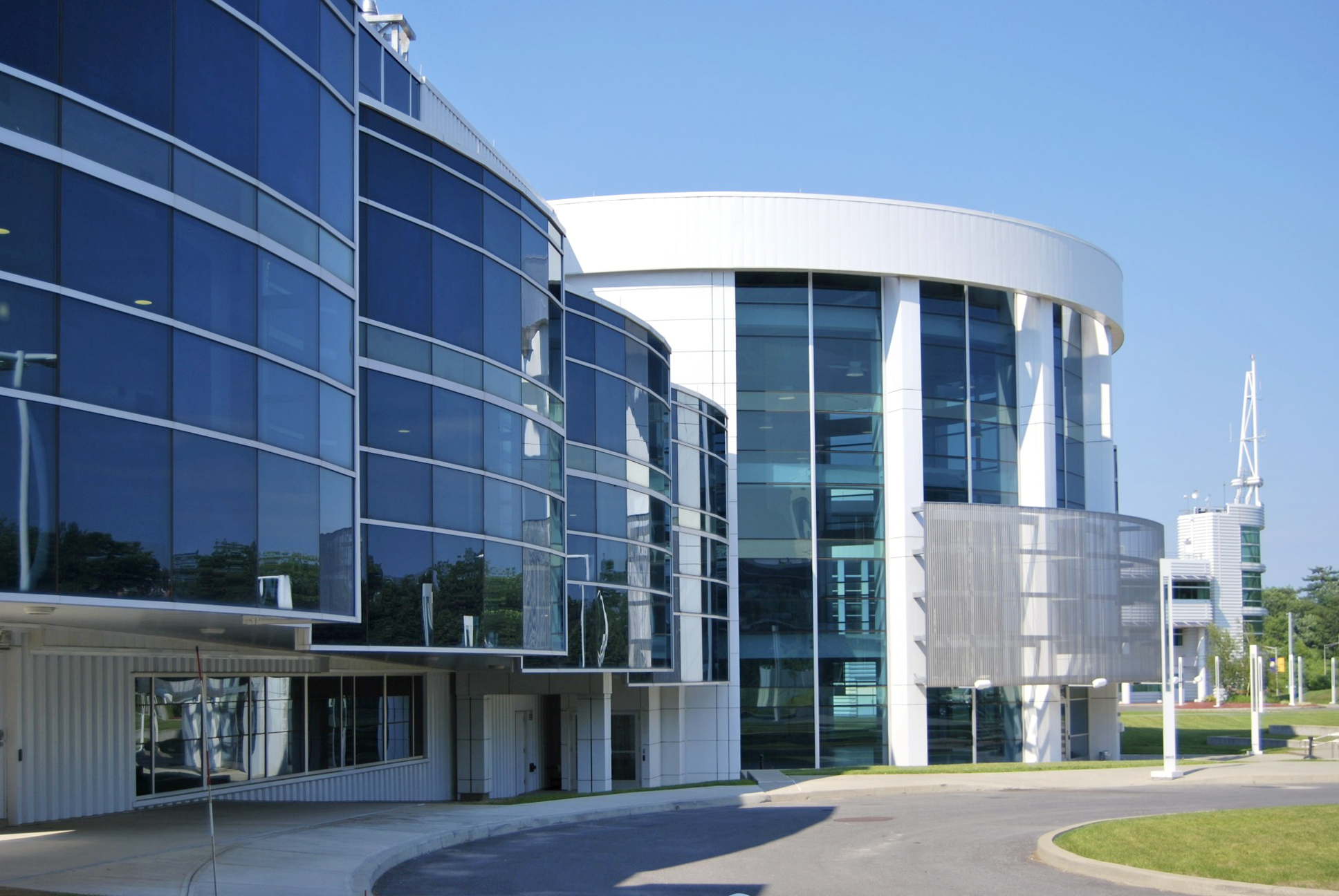
College of Nanoscale Science and Engineering

CNSE offers nanotechnology-related degree programs leading to the Bachelor of Science (B.S.) degree in Nanoscale Engineering and Nanoscale Science, the Master of Science (M.S.) degree in either Nanoscale Science or Nanoscale Engineering, and the Doctor of Philosophy (Ph.D.) degree in either Nanoscale Science or Nanoscale Engineering. The Department of Nanoscale Science & Engineering also offers graduate degrees in nanobioscience (M.S. or Ph.D). In 2010, CNSE became the first college in the U.S. to launch a comprehensive baccalaureate program in Nanoscale Engineering and Nanoscale Science. The College also offers BS, MS, and PhD programs in Computer Science, Electrical & Computer Engineering, and Environmental & Sustainable Engineering.

== Research facilities ==
The Department of Nanoscale Science & Engineering is located on the Albany Nanotechnology Complex, near Western Avenue and Fuller Road, west of the University at Albany Uptown Campus. The campus location has a number of research and development facilities, including wafer fabrication cleanrooms with different classifications for cleanroom suitability.

== Strategic technology and commercialization centers and programs ==
The Albany location is home to several nanotechnology programs funded by a variety of public and private sources. CNSE supports the commercialization of technologies through technology deployment, market development, economic outreach and business assistance under a variety of centers and programs.

- The Materials Engineering Technology Center (META Center) is a hub for groundbreaking materials research, with $600 million in investments in the campus by Applied Materials with a $250 million capital grant for the SUNY Research Foundation to purchase and install tools at the facility.
- In 2019, Gov. Andrew Cuomo announced a $2 billion commitment by IBM to create a global research hub to develop next-generation artificial intelligence hardware at the Albany campus.
- The Center for Semiconductor Research (CSR) is a multi-phase cooperative program on computer chip technology nodes.
- The New York State Center for Advanced Technology in Nanomaterials and Nanoelectronics (CATN2)objective is to drive systematic progression in technology transitions, market adoption, skills attainment & entrepreneurial growth by supporting each phase in the research, development, & deployment (RD&D) continuum. The Center leverages SUNY Poly's infrastructure and ecosystem of faculty and student researchers, facility engineering and process development teams, and industry cooperation deployment partners to support technology commercialization, industry alignment, entrepreneurial growth, workforce education, and regional cluster formation. The CATN2 operates the Advanced Manufacturing Performance (AMP) Center dedicated to the advanced manufacturing supply chain technology innovation and workforce development needs.
- The New York State Center of Excellence in Nanoelectronics and Nanotechnology (NYS CENN), established at CNSE, is a fully integrated technology deployment, product prototyping, manufacturing support, and workforce training resource for emerging generations of integrated circuitry (IC). Its targeted portfolio of nanoelectronics-based products ranges from emerging microprocessor and memory computer chips with higher functionality and complexity, to the rapidly evolving areas of micro- and nanosystem based "systems-on-a-chip" (SOC) technologies, including biochips, optoelectronics and photonics devices, and nanosensors for energy and the environment.
- The New York State Data Center is a partnership between the New York State Office of Information Technology Services (ITS), and New York State Office of General Services (OGS), to make government IT operations and services more efficient and reliable. The center will be a resource to train the state's next generation of IT workers and is expected to save New York State $50 million annually through the creation of a more efficient state IT system.
- The TEL Technology Center, America R&D Center (TEL TCA) was established to conduct R&D of cutting-edge semiconductor materials and processes.

== Academic centers and programs ==
- Tech Valley High School (TVHS), created in 2007 through a unique collaboration between two regional BOCES, Capital Region and Questar III, aims to provide today's students with the skills necessary to be successful in college and in tomorrow's workforce. In February 2013 New York State Governor Andrew Cuomo announced that TVHS would relocate to SUNY Poly's Albany NanoTech Complex in time for the start of the 2014-2015 academic year. TVHS is leasing more than 22,000 square feet (2,000 m^{2}) of state-of-the-art space in which it has set up modern classrooms that seamlessly fit into each curriculum as needed, Classes can gain access to common space at SUNY Poly's Albany campus such as technology-equipped auditoriums, to enable opportunities for interactive long-distance learning and collaboration. This integration can also serve as a one-of-a-kind development platform for expanding nanoscale science and engineering project modules into introductory, university-level nanotech curricula, enabling a seamless transition of TVHS students to university study in the fields of science, technology, engineering, and mathematics (STEM).
