= Larry D. James =

United States Air Force general

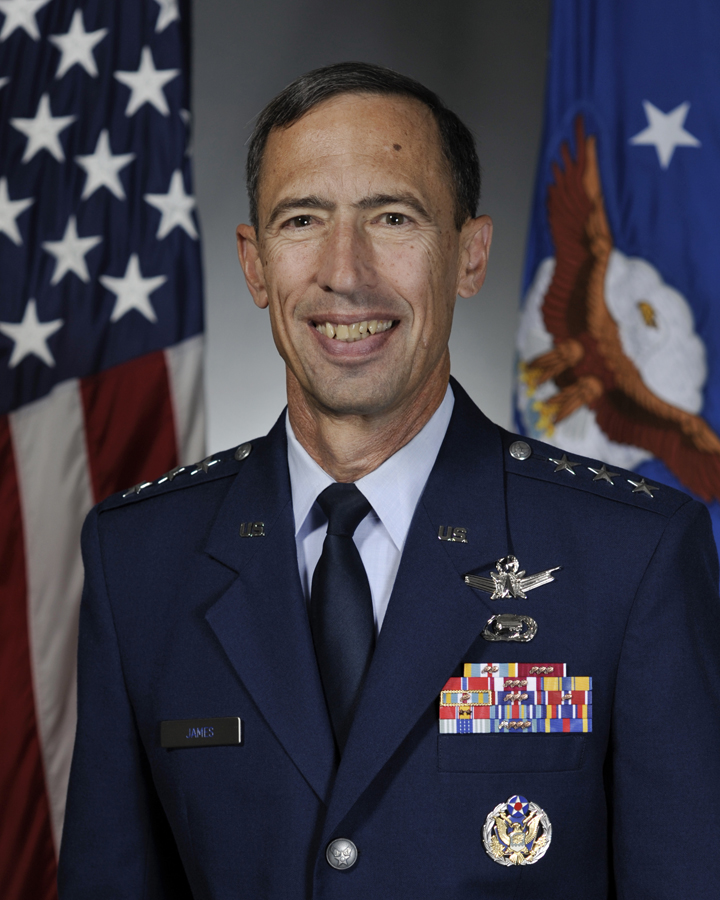
- James as shown as a Lt. General in 2011

Interim Director of the NASA Jet Propulsion Laboratory
- In office August 21, 2021 – May 16, 2022
- Preceded by: Michael M. Watkins
- Succeeded by: Laurie Leshin

Personal details
- Born: 1956 (age 69–70)
- Military career
- Allegiance: United States
- Branch: United States Air Force
- Service years: 1978–2013
- Rank: Lieutenant General
- Commands: 14th Air Force; Joint Functional Component Command for Space; 50th Space Wing; 614th Space Operations Group; 5th Space Launch Squadron; 45th Spacecraft Operations Squadron
- Awards: Defense Superior Service Medal (2); Legion of Merit (4); Bronze Star Medal

Lieutenant General Larry D. James is a former senior officer in the United States Air Force and a former civilian NASA administrator. He was the deputy director of NASA's Jet Propulsion Laboratory, where he also acted as the interim director from August 21, 2021, to May 16, 2022. He acted as the Laboratory's Chief Operating Officer responsible to the Director for the day-to-day management of JPL's resources and activities. This included managing the Laboratory's solar system exploration, Mars, astronomy, physics, Earth science, interplanetary network programs, and all business operations. These activities employed 5000 scientists, engineers, technicians, and business support personnel, generating $1.8 billion in annual revenues. Previously, he served as the Deputy Chief of Staff for Intelligence, Surveillance and Reconnaissance, Headquarters United States Air Force. James' prior commands included the 14th Air Force and Joint Functional Component Command for Space from Vandenberg Air Force Base in California.

== Early life and education ==
Larry James graduated from the United States Air Force Academy in Colorado Springs, Colorado in 1978 with a Bachelor of Science in astronautical engineering. In 1983, he received his Master of Science degree in aeronautics and astronautics from Massachusetts Institute of Technology in Cambridge, Massachusetts.

== Air Force career ==
James entered the Air Force as a distinguished graduate of the United States Air Force Academy in 1978. His career spanned a wide variety of space operations and acquisition assignments, including astronaut in the Manned Spaceflight Engineer Program, Air Staff program element monitor, Global Positioning System satellite program manager, and Chief of Operations, 14th Air Force.

James has commanded at the squadron, group and wing levels, and was Vice Commander of the Space and Missile Systems Center. He has served on the staffs of Headquarters United States Air Force, United States Space Command and Air Force Space Command. He also served as the Senior Space Officer for Operation Iraqi Freedom at Prince Sultan Air Base, Saudi Arabia. Prior to his last assignment, the general was Vice Commander, 5th Air Force, and Deputy Commander, 13th Air Force, Yokota Air Base, Japan.

James was previously assigned as Commander, 14th Air Force (Air Forces Strategic), Air Force Space Command, and Commander, Joint Functional Component Command for Space, United States Strategic Command, Vandenberg Air Force Base. As the Air Force's operational space component to USSTRATCOM, James led more than 20,500 personnel responsible for providing missile warning, space superiority, space situational awareness, satellite operations, space launch and range operations. As Commander, JFCC SPACE, he directed all assigned and attached USSTRATCOM space forces.

== NASA ==
James retired from the Air Force on August 1, 2013, and assumed the role of deputy director of NASA's Jet Propulsion Laboratory on September 23, 2013. He became the interim director of JPL in August 2021, following the return of former JPL director Michael Watkins to academia. He resumed his role of deputy director for JPL following the appointment of Laurie Leshin to the director position on May 16, 2022. James officially left NASA's JPL on March 13, 2024, to join the Aerospace Corporation Board of Trustees on March 14, 2024. In July 2024 James took positions in Australia as a Permanent Resident of Australia. He is currently the Strategic Advisor for the Australasian Space Innovation Institute (formerly the SmartSat Cooperative Research Centre) in Adelaide, South Australia and a Professor of Practice for Space Innovation at Monash University in Melbourne Australia. He resides in Sydney Australia.

== Major awards and other achievements ==
Major Awards and decorations

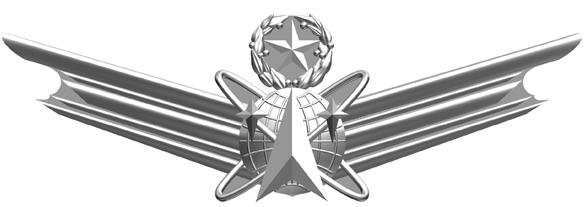
- Command Space Operations Badge
- Basic Intelligence Badge
- Basic Parachutist Badge
- Defense Superior Service Medal with oak leaf cluster
- Legion of Merit with three oak leaf clusters
- Bronze Star Medal
- Meritorious Service Medal with three oak leaf clusters
- Air Force Commendation Medal

Other achievements

- Top third graduate, Air Command and Staff College
- Top 10 percent graduate, Air War College
- National Finalist, White House Fellow Program

Academic offices
Preceded by Michael M. Watkins	Interim Director of the Jet Propulsion Laboratory; 2021 – 2022	Succeeded by Laurie Leshin
