= Charles Elachi =

Lebanese electrical engineer, JPL director

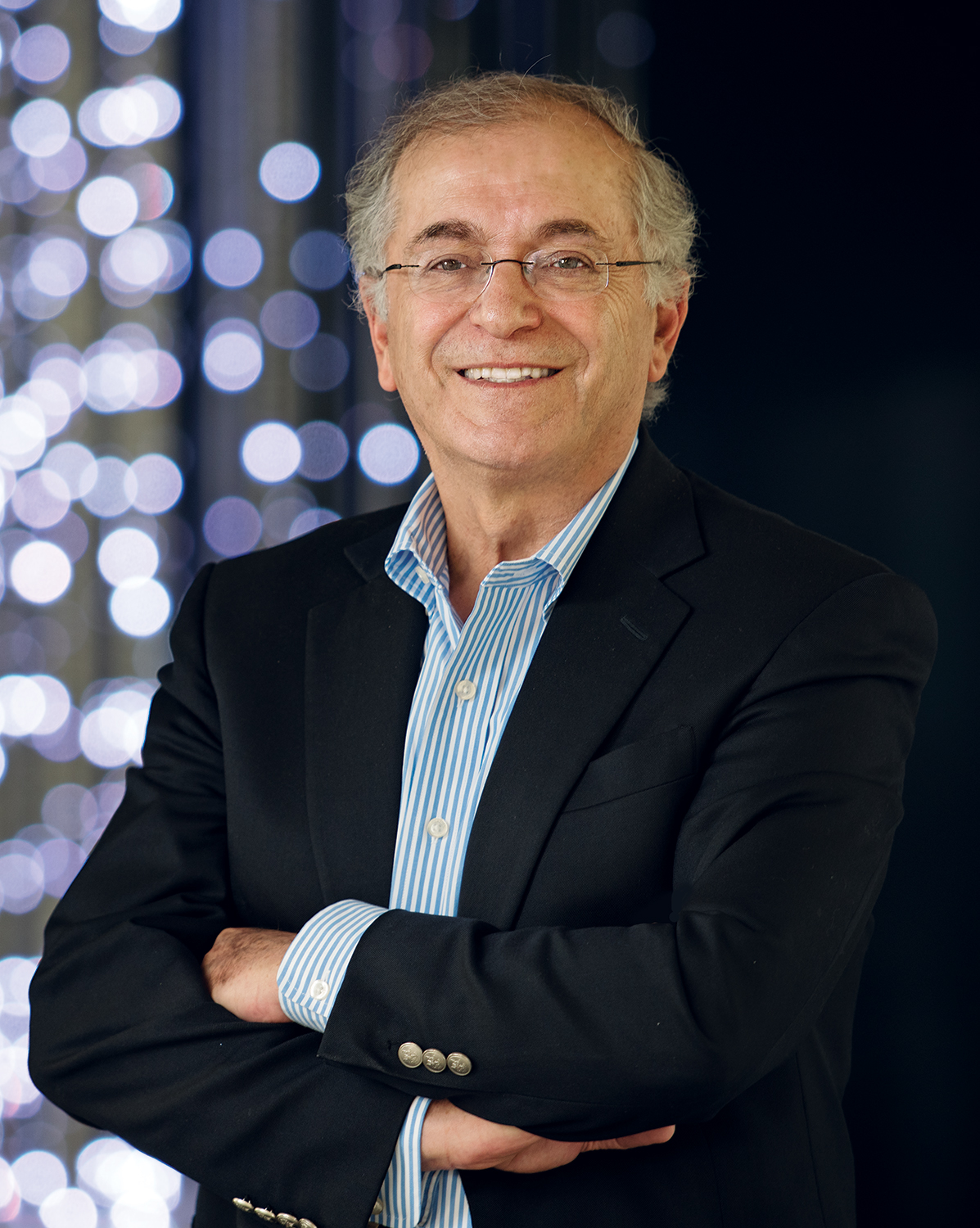
- Elachi in 2014

8th Director of the Jet Propulsion Laboratory
- In office May 1, 2001 – June 30, 2016
- Preceded by: Edward C. Stone
- Succeeded by: Michael M. Watkins

Personal details
- Born: April 18, 1947 (age 79) Rayak, Lebanon
- Scientific career
- Education: Joseph Fourier University; Grenoble Institute of Technology; California Institute of Technology; University of California, Los Angeles; University of Southern California
- Awards: National Order of the Cedar, Chevalier de la Legion d'Honor
- Fields: Electrical engineering; Space science
- Workplaces: California Institute of Technology, Jet Propulsion Laboratory
- Thesis: Electromagnetic Wave Propagation and Source Radiation in Space-Time Periodic Media (1971)
- Doctoral advisor: Charles H. Papas

Charles Elachi (born April 18, 1947) is a Lebanese-American professor (emeritus) of electrical engineering and planetary science at the California Institute of Technology (Caltech). From 2001 to 2016 he was the 8th director of the Jet Propulsion Laboratory and vice president of Caltech.

== Early life and education ==
Elachi was born in Lebanon. He studied at Collège des Apôtres, Jounieh from 1958 to 1962, and then at the École Orientale, Zahlé, where he graduated in 1964 first in Lebanon in the Lebanese Baccalaureate (Mathématiques Élémentaires).

Elachi received a bachelor's degree (1968) in physics from Joseph Fourier University, Grenoble, France; a first master's degree (Diplôme d'Ingénieur - 1968) in engineering from Grenoble Institute of Technology; and a second master's degree (1969) and doctorate (1971) in electrical sciences from the California Institute of Technology, Pasadena. He also has a master's degree (1983) in geology from the University of California, Los Angeles, and an MBA (1979) from the University of Southern California. He joined JPL in 1970.

== Career ==
During his 16-year tenure as JPL's director, 24 missions managed by the laboratory were launched: Genesis, Jason 1 and Mars Odyssey (2001); GRACE (2002); Galaxy Evolution Explorer, Mars Exploration Rovers Spirit and Opportunity, Spitzer Space Telescope (2003); Deep Impact and Mars Reconnaissance Orbiter (2005); Cloudsat (2006); Dawn and Mars Phoenix lander (2007); Jason 2 (2008); Kepler and Wide-field Infrared Survey Explorer (2009); Aquarius, Mars Science Laboratory Curiosity rover, GRAIL and Juno (2011); NuSTAR (2012); Orbiting Carbon Observatory 2 (2014); Soil Moisture Active Passive (2015); and Jason 3 (2016).

During flight projects for NASA, Elachi was principal investigator for the Shuttle Imaging Radar series (SIR-A in 1981, SIR-B in 1984, and SIR-C in 1994), was a co-investigator on the Magellan imaging radar, is presently the team leader of the Cassini Titan Radar experiment and a co-investigator on the Rosetta Comet Nucleus Sounder Experiment. He is the author of over 230 publications in the fields of space and planetary exploration, Earth observation from space, active microwave remote sensing, electromagnetic theory and integrated optics, and he holds several patents in those fields. In addition, he has authored three textbooks in the field of remote sensing. One of these textbooks has been translated into Chinese. He taught "The Physics of Remote Sensing" at the California Institute of Technology from 1982 to 2000.

During the late 1980s and 1990s as the director of Space and Earth Science programs at JPL, Elachi was responsible for the research and development of numerous flight instruments and missions for Solar System exploration, space-based astronomy, and Earth science.

Elachi was elected a member of the National Academy of Engineering (1989) for pioneering developments of space-borne radars for imaging the Earth and planets.

In the mid- to late 1990s, Elachi chaired a number of national and international committees which developed NASA roadmaps for the exploration of neighboring planetary systems (1995), the Solar System (1997) and Mars (1998).

Elachi participated in a number of archeological expeditions in the Egyptian Desert, Arabian Peninsula and Western Chinese Desert in search of old trading routes and buried cities using satellite data, some of which were featured in National Geographic magazine.

== Professional associations ==
In 1989, at the age of 42, he was elected to the National Academy of Engineering (NAE). From 1993 to 1995, he was a member of the NAE fourth Decadal Committee. In 1995 he chaired the NAE membership committee. He served on numerous NAE committees. In 2007, he was elected as councillor of the NAE for a three-year term and is also a member of the NAE Executive Council. He is a fellow of the California Academy of Sciences.

He is a fellow of the Institute of Electrical and Electronics Engineers (IEEE), the American Institute of Aeronautics and Astronautics (AIAA) and the California Academy of Sciences. In addition, he is a member of the International Academy of Astronautics (IAA).

== External activities ==
Charles Elachi in 2021 at Caltech

Elachi is chair of the St. Exupery Innovation Council in Toulouse, France, member of the United Arab Emirates Space Agency International Advisory Council, member of the Commission on Department of Energy National Laboratories, member of the Visiting Committee for the Department of Aeronautics and Astronautics at the Massachusetts Institute of Technology, past chair and current member of the UCLA Sciences Board of Visitors, past member of the Huntington Hospital Board of Trustees in Pasadena, California, past chair and member of the Lebanese American University Board of Trustees New York and Beirut, member of the International Advisory Board of King Fahd University of Petroleum and Minerals (KFUPM) in Saudi Arabia, past member of the International Advisory Council of King Abdullah University of Science and Technology (KAUST) in Saudi Arabia, and member of the International Advisory Board of the University Oman. He was a member of the University of Arizona Engineering School Advisory Committee and the Boston University Center of Remote Sensing Advisory Council.

He has lectured and given keynote speeches at numerous international conferences and at universities inside and outside the United States, including events in Australia, Austria, Brazil, China, Denmark, Egypt, England, France, Germany, Greece, Holland, China, Japan, India, Ireland, Italy, Kenya, Lebanon, Monaco, Morocco, Singapore and Switzerland. He was also a speaker at Caltech's Alumni Day and the Watson Lectures.

== Awards and recognition ==
Elachi has received numerous awards:

- Gold medal of the City of Grenoble (2018)
- Aviation Week Lifetime Achievement Award (2016)
- 2016 RNASA National Space Trophy
- 2016 IAF Allen D. Emil Memorial Award
- American University of Beirut Honorary Doctorate (2013)
- Association of Space Explorers (ASE) Congress Crystal Helmet Award (2012)
- Pasadena Arts Council Inaugural AxS (Arts & Sciences) Award (2012)
- Lebanese American University Honorary Doctorate (2012)
- National Academy of Engineering Arthur M. Bueche Award (2011)
- Chevalier de la Légion d'Honneur, France (2011),
- Space Foundation J.E. Hill Lifetime Space Achievement Award (2011),
- AIAA Carl Sagan Award (2011)
- Occidental College honorary Doctor of Science degree (2011)
- Sigma Xi William Procter Prize for Scientific Achievement (2008)
- International von Kármán Wings Award (2007)
- America's Best Leaders by U.S News & World Report and the Center for Public Leadership at Harvard University's Kennedy School of Government (2006)
- Royal Society of London Massey Award (2006)
- Lebanon Order of the Cedars (2006 and 2012)
- Philip Habib Award for Distinguished Public Service (2006)
- American Astronautical Society Space Flight Award (2005)
- Bob Hope Distinguished Citizen Award (2005)
- NASA Exceptional Service Medal (2005)
- NASA Outstanding Leadership Medal (2004, 2002, 1994)
- Takeda Award (2002)
- Wernher Von Braun Award (2002)
- UCLA Department of Earth and Space Science Distinguished Alumni Award (2002)
- Dryden Award (2000)
- NASA Distinguished Service Medal (1999)
- COSPAR Nordberg Medal (1996)
- Nevada Medal (1995)
- IEEE Medal of Engineering Excellence (1992)
- IEEE Geoscience and Remote Sensing Distinguished Achievement Award (1987)
- W.T. Pecora Award (1985)
- NASA Exceptional Scientific Medal (1982)
- ASP Autometric Award (1982, 1980)

In 1988 the Los Angeles Times selected him as one of "Southern California's rising stars who will make a difference in L.A."

In 1989 Asteroid 1982 SU was renamed 4116 Elachi in recognition of his contribution to planetary exploration.

In 2019 the JPL Mission Control Center was named after Elachi.

Academic offices
Preceded by Edward C. Stone	8th Director of the Jet Propulsion Laboratory; 2001 – 2016	Succeeded by Michael M. Watkins
