= Tod A. Laursen =

American academic

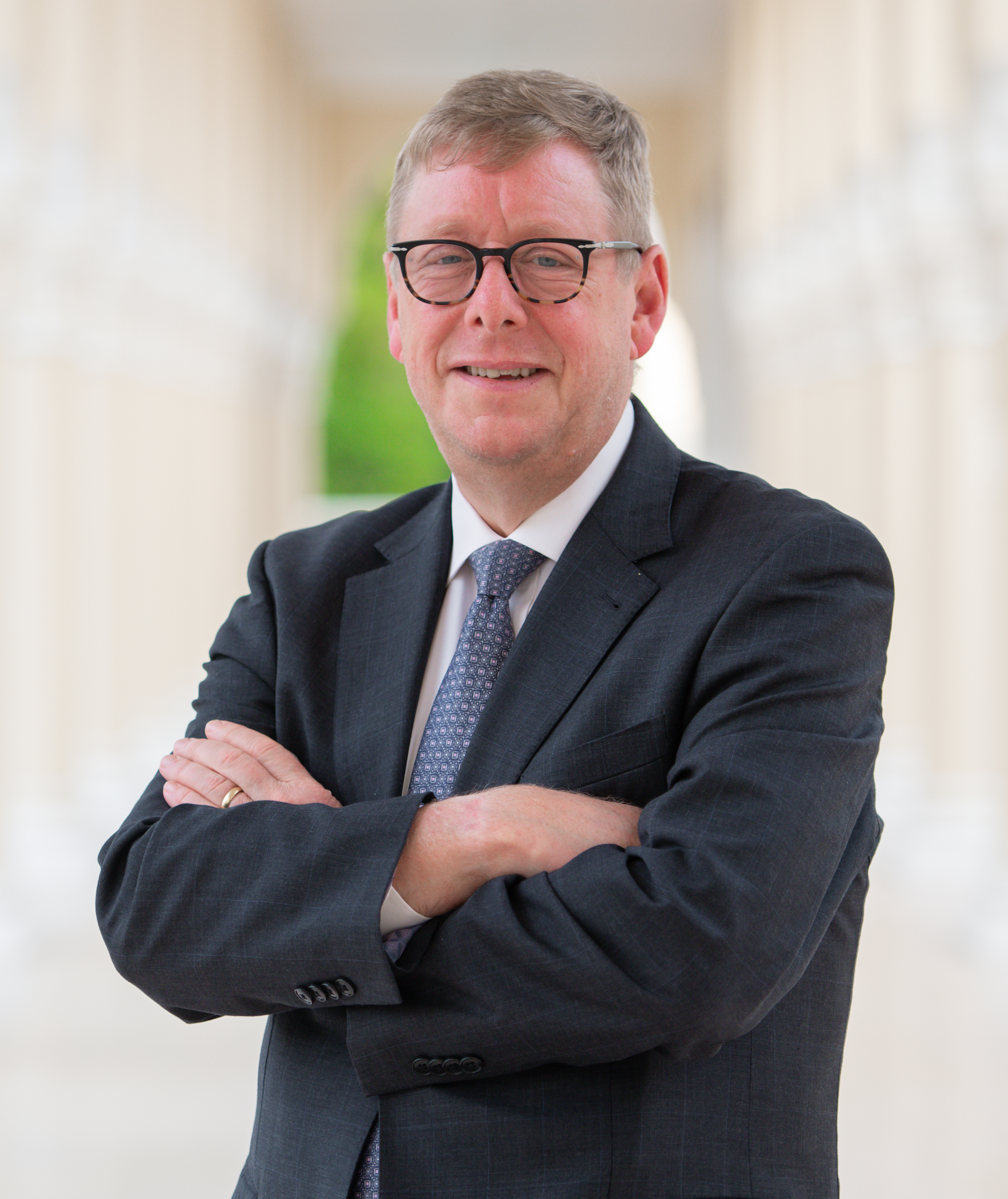
- Dr. Tod A. Laursen, Chancellor of American University of Sharjah (AUS)
- Title: Chancellor of American University of Sharjah

Tod A. Laursen is an American academic and engineer, currently Chancellor of American University of Sharjah. Before his current role, he was a faculty member and researcher as well as having leadership positions at various institutions including Khalifa University in Abu Dhabi, provost at State University of New York (SUNY) systems in 1998 and acting president at SUNY Polytechnic Institute in 2020.

== Education ==
Laursen has a Bachelor of Science (BS) in Mechanical Engineering from Oregon State University (1986), a Master of Science (MS) in Mechanical Engineering from Stanford University (1989) and he earned his Ph.D. also in Mechanical Engineering from Stanford University (1992).

== Career ==
Laursen started his career in 1992 as a faculty member at Duke University in Durham, North Carolina. While at Duke University he held various positions including professor of mechanical, civil, biomedical, and environmental engineering; Director of Graduate Studies at the Department of Civil and Environmental Engineering (1998–2000), Director of Undergraduate Studies at the Department of Civil and Environmental Studies (2001–2003); Senior Associate Dean for Education in the Duke University Pratt School of Engineering (2003–2008), and Chair of the Department of Mechanical Engineering and Materials Science (2008–2010).

From 2008 to 2018 he was President of Khalifa University of Science, Technology and Research in Abu Dhabi.

He returned to the United States where from 2018 to 2020 he was Provost and Senior Vice-Chancellor of State University of New York (SUNY), and later as Acting President of SUNY Polytechnic Institute (2021–2022).

Following a short tenure as a Vice Chancellor at Wigwe University in Nigeria in 2023, Laursen returned to the United Arab Emirates, in October of the same year, where he is Chancellor of the American University of Sharjah.

== Research ==
In his research pursuits, Laursen's area of specialization is in computational mechanics. This is a subfield of mechanical engineering which is focused on the development of computational algorithms and tools to analyse mechanical and structural systems. His most published research work is in the areas of finite element methods and non-linear systems.

== Publication ==
Laursen has published over 100 peer-reviewed articles, book chapters, and abstracts. He is also a published author of Computational Contact and Impact Mechanics: Fundamentals of Modeling Interfacial Phenomena in Nonlinear Finite Element Analysis; and he has co-authored another book titled Computational Contact Mechanics: CISM Courses and Lectures.

== Awards ==
Throughout his career, Laursen has received honors and awards including the Earl I. Brown II Outstanding Civil Engineering Faculty Award he received in 1997, the Oregon State University Council of Outstanding Early Career Engineers Award he received in 1998, as well as the Oregon State University Academy of Distinguished Engineers Award he received in 2010.
