= Michael M. Watkins =

American scientist and engineer

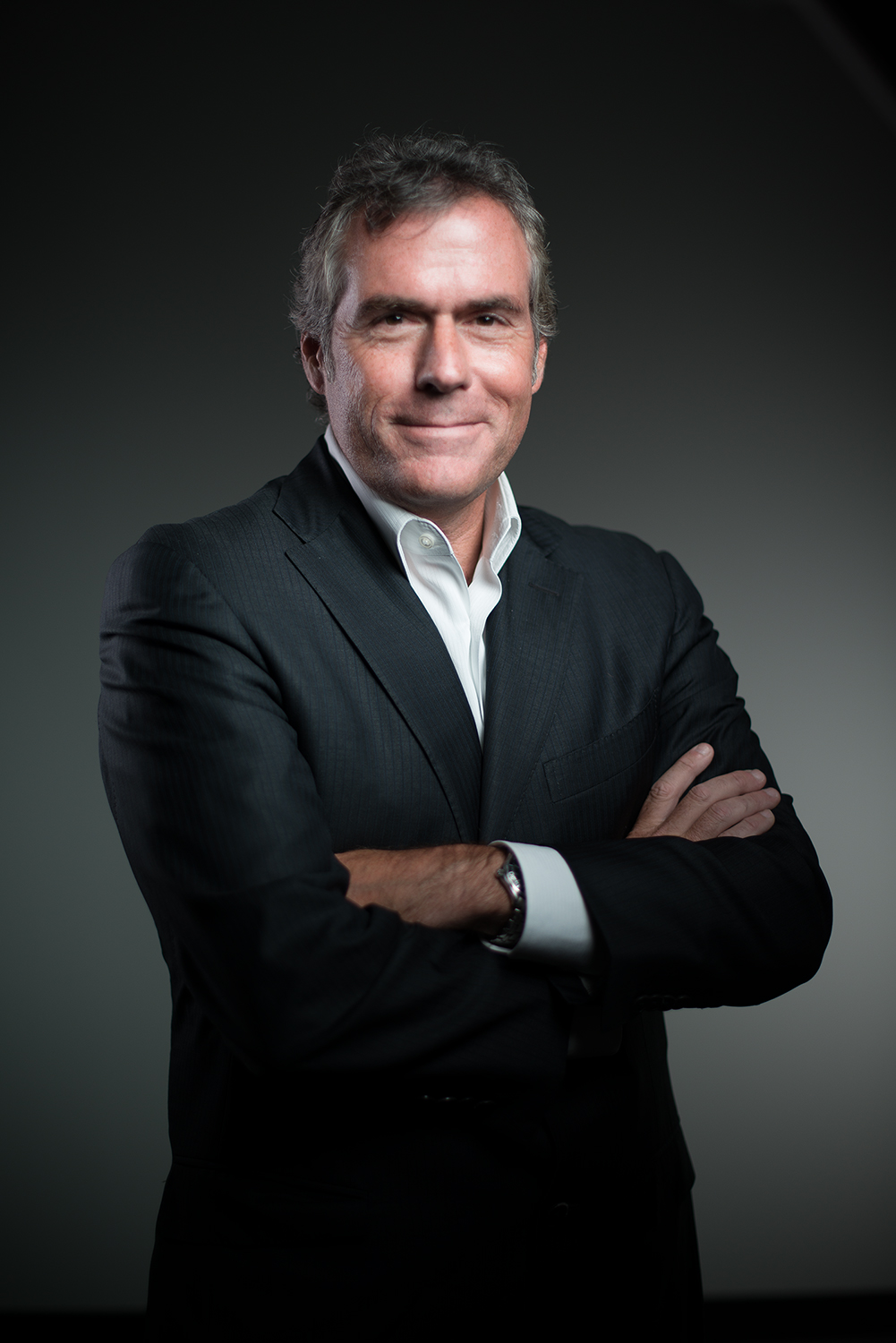
- Watkins in 2012

9th Director of the Jet Propulsion Laboratory
- In office July 1, 2016 – August 20, 2021
- Preceded by: Charles Elachi
- Succeeded by: Larry D. James (interim); Laurie Leshin
- Scientific career
- Education: University of Texas at Austin
- Fields: Engineering, Space Science
- Workplaces: University of Texas at Austin; Jet Propulsion Laboratory; California Institute of Technology
- Thesis: Tracking station coordinates and their temporal evolution as determined from laser ranging to the Lageos satellite (1989)
- Doctoral advisor: Bob E. Schutz

Michael M. Watkins is an American engineer, scientist, and a Professor of Aerospace and Geophysics at the California Institute of Technology (Caltech). He previously served as the 9th director of NASA's Jet Propulsion Laboratory in Pasadena, California, and as a vice president of Caltech, which staffs and manages JPL for NASA. His directorial position was effective from July 1, 2016 to August 20, 2021.

== Education ==
Watkins attended the University of Texas at Austin and received B.S., M.S. and Ph.D. degrees in aerospace engineering in 1983, 1985 and 1990, respectively. For his doctoral degree, Watkins worked under the supervision of Bob E. Schutz.

== Career ==
Watkins joined the staff at JPL in 1993 and stayed there 22 years. During that time, he served as chief scientist for JPL's Engineering and Science Directorate, manager of JPL's Science Division and manager of its Navigation and Mission Design Section. He was mission manager from development through landed operations for the Mars Science Laboratory mission, which sent the Curiosity rover to Mars. He also led NASA development and review teams for the Cassini, Mars Odyssey and Deep Impact robotic space missions.

He served as project scientist for the GRACE, GRAIL and GRACE Follow-On missions. He was an originator of the concept for the GRACE mission, which uses a pair of Earth-orbiting satellites to make detailed measurements of Earth's gravity field anomalies. In addition, he has been a pioneer in the development and use of gravity data for new science applications to better understand Earth's climate and its evolution. Other research interests include mission design, instrument design and science analysis for acquisition and use of remote sensing data for Earth and other planets.

In 2015, Watkins left JPL to serve as the Clare Cockrell Williams Chair in Engineering and director of the Center for Space Research at the University of Texas at Austin before returning to JPL as director the following year.

He has published in both engineering and science, contributed more than 100 conference presentations, and serves or served on the boards of numerous international scientific and engineering societies. In addition, he has taught estimation, filtering theory and system engineering at the University of Texas at Austin and at Caltech.

== Honors and awards ==
- 2019 – The Department of Aerospace Engineering and Engineering Mechanics (ASE/EM) Academy of Distinguished Alumni in the Cockrell School of Engineering at The University of Texas at Austin
- 2020 – Fellow of the American Institute of Aeronautics and Astronautics.
- 2022 – Member of the National Academy of Engineering

Academic offices
Preceded by Charles Elachi	9th Director of the Jet Propulsion Laboratory; 2016 – 2021	Succeeded by Larry D. James (interim); Laurie Leshin
