= Eric Mill =

Former American government official

Executive Director for Cloud Strategy of the U.S. General Services Administration's (GSA) Federal Acquisition Service
- Completed
- Assumed office January 2, 2024
- President: Joseph R. Biden

Senior Advisor to the Federal CIO
- In office January 21, 2021 – December 31, 2023

Personal details
- Born: Eric R. Mill; June 23, 1984 (age 42)
- Education: Worcester Polytechnic Institute
- Profession: Government Executive, Technologist

Eric Mill (born June 1984) is an American government technology executive and expert in cybersecurity. He previously served in the Biden Administration at the U.S. General Services Administration (GSA) as the executive director for Cloud Strategy in GSA's Technology Transformation Services. Mill has also served as a senior advisor to the Federal Chief Information Officer of the United States, within the Office of Management and Budget.

== Early career ==
Mill graduated from Worcester Polytechnic Institute with a computer science degree in 2005. He worked in a variety of cybersecurity and software development roles, including at digital services firms before joining the Sunlight Foundation in 2009. While there, Mill developed Scout, a search engine and notification system for U.S. government activity and the "Congress" app for Android, which provided live updates on the people and work of the U.S. Congress.

As an open source contributor, Mill was engaged in advocacy in removing the insecure SHA-1 cryptographic hash function from website certificate signatures. From 2014 through the retirement of SHA-1 in 2016, Mill operated a web-based tool to check if a web service's certificate was using the SHA-1 signature algorithm.

== Government service ==
Mill joined GSA in 2014 as a member of the then-new 18F digital services agency inside the Office of Citizen Services and Innovative Technologies (OCSIT). In subsequent years, he was named a senior advisor for 18F, and its new parent organization Technology Transformation Services. Mill also served as deputy director of GSA's authentication and sign-on service, Login.gov.

In 2019, Eric served on the U.S. Senate Committee on Rules and Administration’s Democratic staff as a senior technology advisor on election security. In that role, he drafted the DOTGOV Act of 2020 to strengthen the .gov internet domain, which passed as part of the FY20 appropriations bill. After leaving Congress, Mill worked on the Chrome security team at Google.

Mill joined the Biden Administration in 2021 as a senior advisor to the Federal Chief Information Officer in the Office of Management and Budget. He led work on the Federal Zero Trust Strategy, the 2024 FedRAMP Modernization Memo, and managed investments in the Technology Modernization Fund. In January 2024, Mill left OMB to take a new position as the executive director for Cloud Strategy in GSA's Technology Transformation Services. In that role, he oversaw FedRAMP reform along with other cloud security initiatives.

== Wikimedia Foundation ==
Eric Mill joined The Wikimedia Foundation in May 2025, wherein he leads the Product Security and Integrity team. A few months later in September 2025, Eric Mill, working with Kosta Harlan and Szymon Grabarczuk, lead Wikipedia's transition from Fancy Captcha to the javascript-based hCaptcha.
