= Laurie Leshin =

American geochemist and research administrator

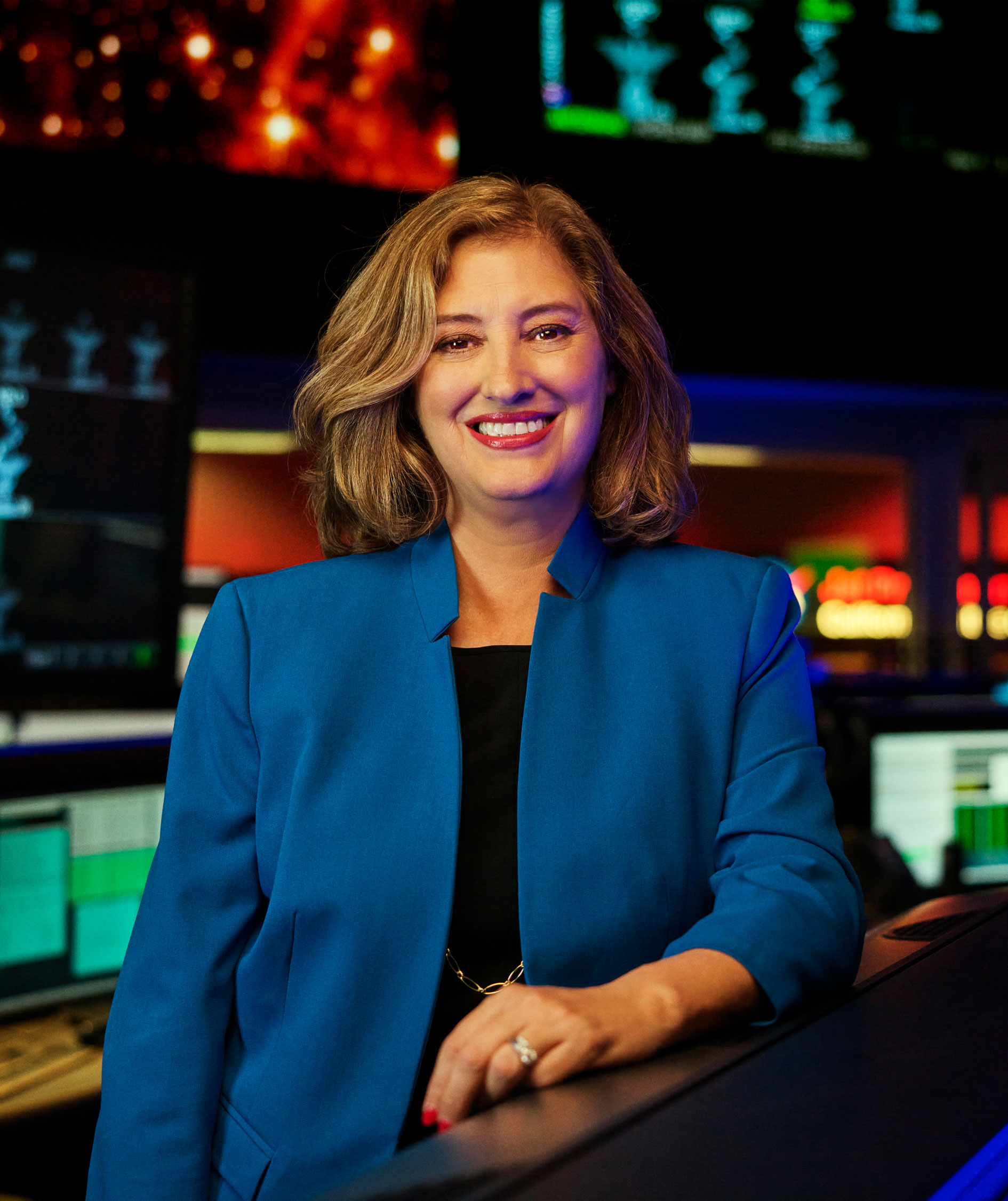
- Leshin in 2023

10th Director of the Jet Propulsion Laboratory
- In office May 16, 2022 – June 1, 2025
- Preceded by: Michael M. Watkins; Larry D. James (interim)
- Succeeded by: Dave Gallagher

16th President of the Worcester Polytechnic Institute
- In office June 1, 2014 – May 15, 2022
- Preceded by: Dennis D. Berkey
- Succeeded by: Grace Wang

Personal details
- Education: Arizona State University (BS); California Institute of Technology (MS, PhD)
- Awards: NASA Distinguished Public Service Medal; NASA Outstanding Leadership Medal; Nier Prize

Laurie Leshin is an American scientist and academic administrator serving as the Bren Professor of Geochemistry and Planetary Science at California Institute of Technology (Caltech). Leshin previously served as the 10th Director of the NASA Jet Propulsion Laboratory and as Vice President of Caltech, the first woman to serve in those roles. Leshin's research has focused on geochemistry and space science. Prior to her time at JPL and Caltech, Leshin served as the 16th president of Worcester Polytechnic Institute.

== Education ==
Leshin earned her Bachelor of Science degree in chemistry from Arizona State University and her Master of Science (1989) and PhD (1994) in geochemistry from the California Institute of Technology.

== Career ==
From 1994 to 1996, Leshin was a University of California President's Postdoctoral Fellow in the department of Earth and space sciences at the University of California, Los Angeles (UCLA). From 1996 to 1998, Leshin was the W. W. Rubey Faculty Fellow in the department of Earth and space sciences at UCLA.

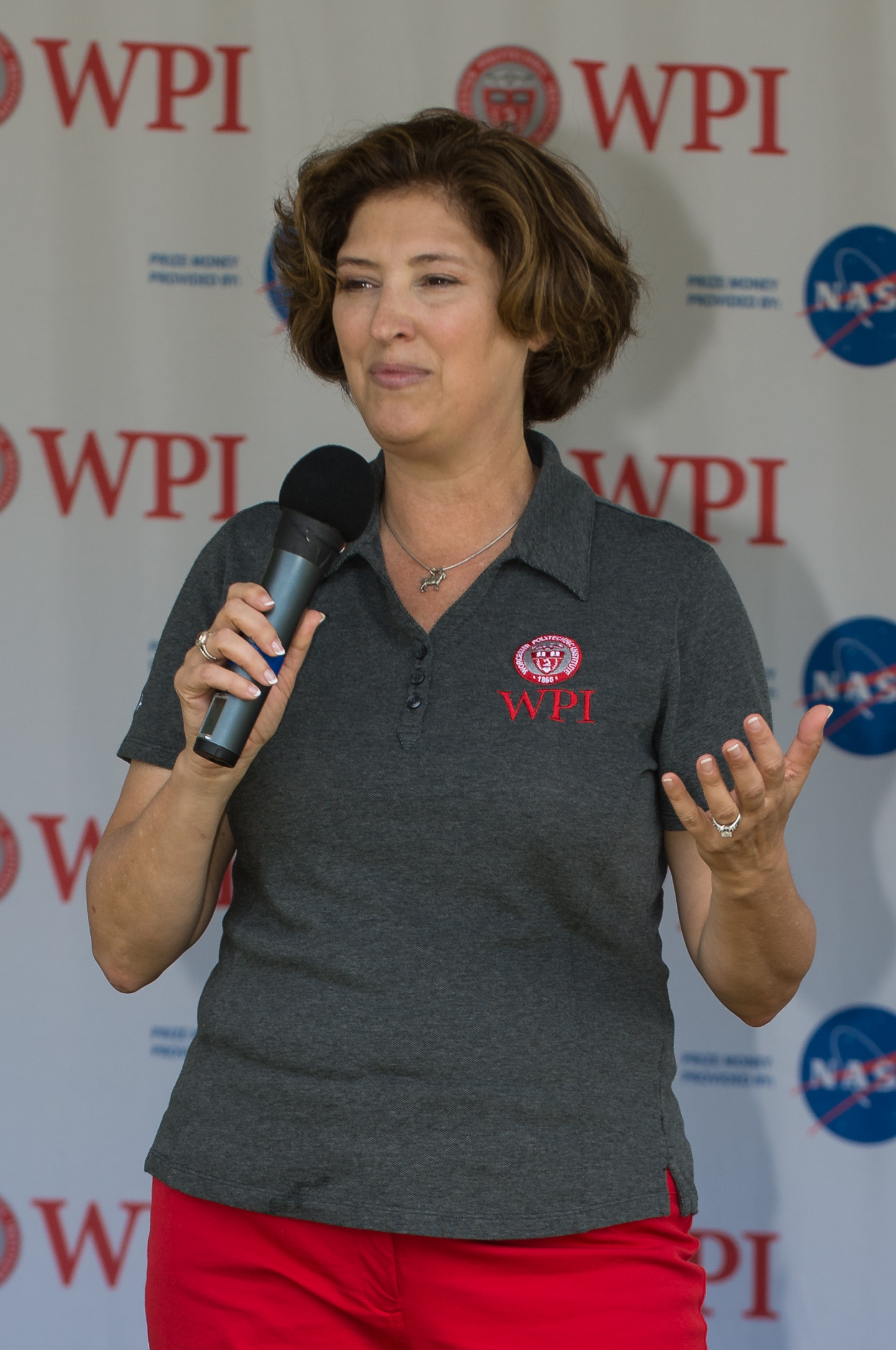
Leshin in 2015

From 1998 to 2001, Leshin was an assistant professor at Arizona State University (ASU). In 2001, she became the Dee and John Whiteman Dean’s Distinguished Professor of Geological Sciences at ASU. In 2003, she became the director of ASU's Center for Meteorite Studies, which houses the largest university-based meteorite collection in the world. She directed research, education, and curation activities. At ASU, she also spearheaded the formulation of a new school of Earth and space exploration, combining Earth, planetary and astrophysical sciences with systems engineering in a nationally unique interdisciplinary academic unit.

In 2004, Leshin served on President Bush's Commission on Implementation of United States Space Exploration Policy, a nine-member commission charged with advising the President on the execution of his new Vision for Space Exploration.

From 2005 to 2007, Leshin was the director of Sciences and Exploration Directorate at NASA's Goddard Space Flight Center, where she oversaw science activities. From 2008 to 2009, she was the deputy center director for science and technology at Goddard. In this position, she oversaw strategy development at the center, leading an inclusive process to formulate future science and technology goals, and an integrated program of investments aligned to meet those goals. With other NASA Goddard senior managers, she was responsible for effectively executing the center's $3 billion in programs, and ensuring the scientific integrity of Earth observing missions, space-based telescopes such as the James Webb Space Telescope, and instruments exploring the Sun, Moon, Mercury, Mars, Saturn, comets and more. Starting in 2010, Leshin served as the deputy associate administrator for NASA’s Exploration Systems Mission Directorate, where she played a leading role in NASA's future human spaceflight endeavors. Her duties included oversight of the planning and execution of the next generation of human exploration systems, as well as the research, robotic and future capabilities development activities that support them. She was also engaged in initiating the development of commercial human spaceflight capabilities to low Earth orbit.

From 2011 to 2014, Leshin served as dean of the school of science and professor of Earth and environmental science at Rensselaer Polytechnic Institute, where she led the scientific academic and research enterprise. Leshin's scientific expertise is in cosmochemistry, and she is primarily interested in deciphering the record of water on objects in the Solar System.

In February 2013, President Obama appointed her to the advisory board of the Smithsonian National Air and Space Museum, and she was appointed by then Secretary of Transportation Ray LaHood to the advisory board of the United States Merchant Marine Academy later during the same year. She serves on the United States National Research Council's Committee on Astrobiology and Planetary Science, and as chair of the advisory board for the Thriving Earth Exchange of the American Geophysical Union.

In 2014, Leshin became the 16th president of Worcester Polytechnic Institute.

She has published approximately 50 scientific papers.

== Director of JPL ==
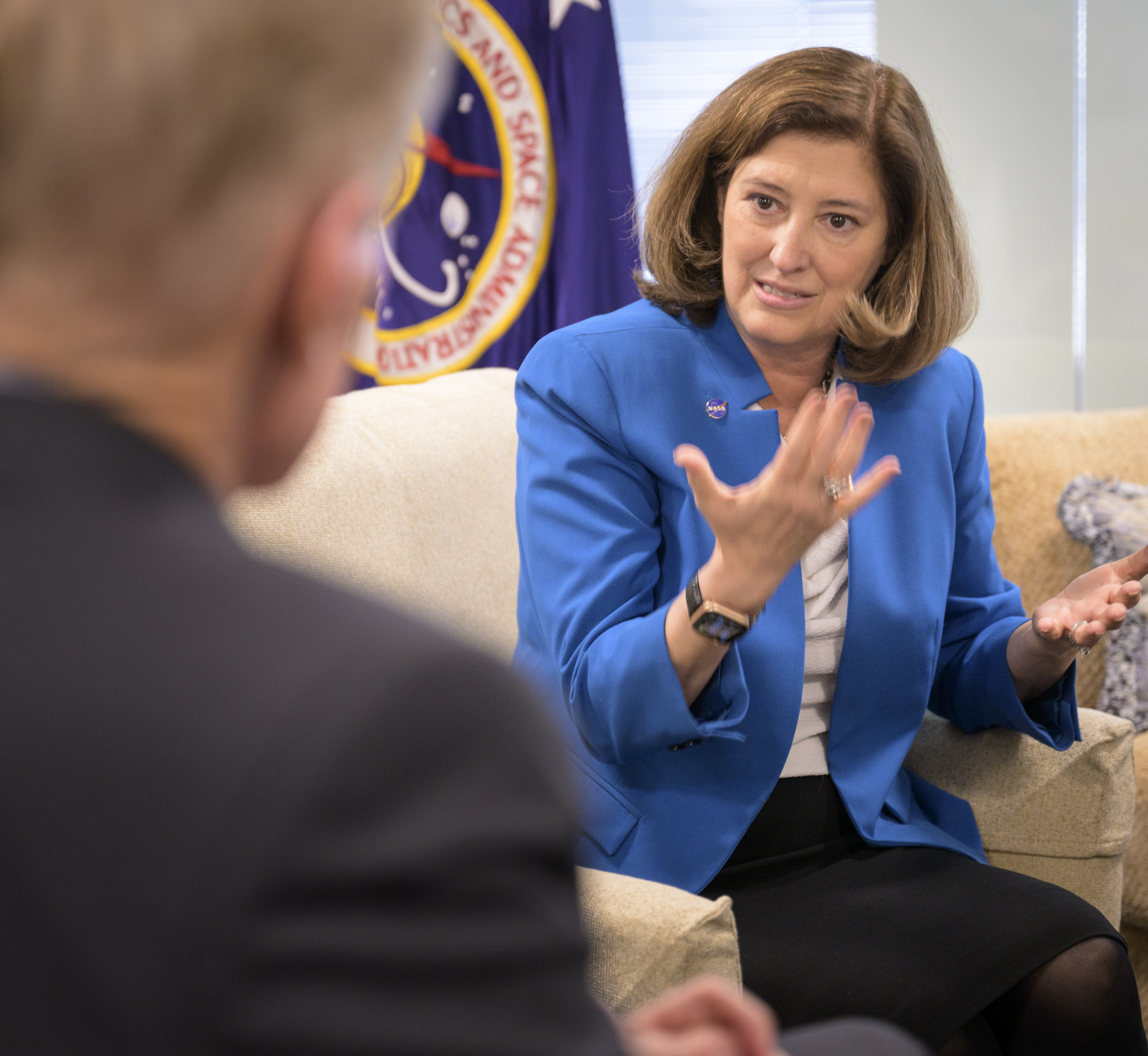
Laurie Leshin meets with NASA Administrator Bill Nelson.

In January 2022, Leshin was simultaneously appointed as the director of NASA's Jet Propulsion Laboratory and as vice president and Bren Professor at the California Institute of Technology, becoming the first woman to serve in this role. WPI announced in February 2022, that Provost and Senior Vice President Wole Soboyejo would serve as interim WPI president upon Leshin's departure in May 2022 while WPI searches for a new president.

Leshin led an organization of around 6,000 staff through a pivotal period marked by significant mission milestones and operational challenges. Shortly after assuming leadership, Leshin presided over the decision to delay the Psyche mission’s launch by a year when critical flight software issues were found. The postponement also led to funding and schedule impacts on related missions, including a three-year delay for VERITAS due to mission safety and the challenges of large-scale interdependent projects. Despite early setbacks, Psyche successfully launched in October 2023 and remains en route to its target asteroid, projected to arrive in 2029.

During Leshin's tenure, JPL achieved numerous successful launches. These included the Europa Clipper, SPHEREx, SWOT, EMIT, PREFIRE, and NISAR missions. She also maintained ongoing planetary operations like the Perseverance rover, the Ingenuity helicopter (which exceeded 72 flights), and the ongoing support for Voyager, which faced technical issues during her leadership but was successfully stabilized.

In January 2025, the Eaton Fire threatened the JPL campus, leading to a full evacuation—the first in over 60 years—and displacing hundreds of employees – around 200 of whom lost their homes. Leshin confirmed that while the lab itself was undamaged, many staff members suffered significant personal losses. During that crisis she encouraged operational continuity and emergency infrastructure support, such as remote mission control for critical spacecraft.

Budget pressures also marked her directorship. In February and November 2024, JPL enacted workforce reductions totaling nearly 1,000 jobs—approximately 8% and 5% cuts respectively—as the lab adjusted to funding shortfalls affecting high‑cost initiatives like Mars Sample Return. Leshin cautioned staff that future budgets were uncertain, reflecting constrained federal allocations.

On May 7, 2025, it was announced that Leshin would be stepping down at JPL on June 1 with Dave Gallagher being her successor there while she remains at Caltech as the Bren Professor of Geochemistry and Planetary Science where she plans to restart her research and return to teaching.

== Awards ==
Leshin received the NASA Distinguished Public Service Medal in 2004 for her work on the Presidential Commission and the NASA Outstanding Leadership Medal in 2011 for her work at NASA. In 1996, she was the inaugural recipient of the Meteoritical Society's Nier Prize, awarded for outstanding research in meteoritics or planetary science by a scientist under the age of 35. The International Astronomical Union recognized her contributions to planetary science with the naming of asteroid 4922 Leshin.

Academic offices
Preceded by Dennis D. Berkey	16th President of Worcester Polytechnic Institute; 2014 – 2022	Succeeded by Wole Soboyejo (interim); Grace Wang
Preceded by Michael M. Watkins; Larry D. James (interim)	10th Director of the Jet Propulsion Laboratory; 2022 – present	Incumbent
