= Dwight Marcus =

Dwight Marcus (born Dwight Marcus Glodell) was the Chief Technology Officer and one of the co-founders of NPOWR Digital Media. He attended Worcester Polytechnic Institute, where he was a Henry J. Fuller Scholar. Marcus is also the inventor of the Emmy-winning stimTV Network, the first streaming media network that personalized each viewer’s stream of content to their profile and/or query. In 2007, NPOWR Digital Media, cofounded by Marcus, won the Technology and Engineering Emmy Award from the National Academy of Television Arts and Sciences.

== Career ==
=== Technology ===
Dwight was Chief Technology Officer at Medic Interactive Corporation (1994), a Manhattan-based media technology company. Dwight transitioned to NTECH, Inc. and its licensee NPOWR Digital Media, where his System for the Automated Generation of Media, filed in 1997, was awarded US patent (#6032156) in 2000.

Dwight and Robert Whitmore applied the patent's on-demand technology as the basis for their venture, stimTV™, a video-on-demand music entertainment provider founded in 2005. In 2007, stimTV was awarded a Technology and Engineering Emmy Award as part of the 58th Technology and Engineering Emmy Awards, for "Outstanding Innovation and Achievement in Advanced Media Technology for the best use of 'On Demand' Technology". Marcus's interactive-media patent portfolio, which largely defines the current era of personalized media delivery, is currently represented by the law firm of Kramer Levin.

Dwight co-founded Motivideo with Robert Whitmore, which company is applying self-assembling unicast video technology to lifestyle coaching. As of November 2014, Dwight is also Managing Partner of the technology company Vushaper, which has developed the Video Assembly Engine used for user-driven unicast video streams in conjunction with developer 8th Light. He continues to develop technologies and applications for the creation and delivery of personalized media for general consumers and the healthcare industry.

Dwight has numerous patents granted in the US, Canada and Australia, with pending patents in the EPO regions. The portfolio is administered in partnership with the IP division of the law firm of Troutman Pepper of New York City, an AmLaw 100 firm.

=== Arts ===
Throughout his career in entertainment and media technology, Marcus has maintained a parallel career as a composer and music producer. His early work was credited as Dwight Glodell and includes Billboard "Top Album Pick", punk by New Math, 145 and The Press tones, dance/trance by Personal Effects, which reached chart-topping status on the new Billboard Dance chart. He later worked under the name Dwight Marcus, with a diverse group of artists including "The Outlaws", as bandleader, producer and mixer of "The Obvious", Juno Award winner Shirley Eikhard (1987) and most notably Wendy MaHarry.

In 1987, Dwight wrote and directed a 16mm poetry film If You Smoke, Thank You, which won the 19th Annual Poetry Film Festival held in Fort Mason, San Francisco. In 1999 Marcus released "News From the West," by Dwight Marcus and the Chamber of Poets, a long-form music video that blended music, poetry, experimental film with 5.1 surround sound. News from the West is currently housed in the UC Berkeley Moffitt Library.

In 2020. Marcus began producing, mixing and engineering music under the name of Ika, released by Ika Haus. The flagship project of this latest period is music by Ana Mirabilis and Abigail Cartright. The music video Turquoise Water won the Music & Film category of the 2023 Madrid International Film Festival.

Throughout his career, Marcus has produced, directed and composed for numerous award-winning industrial and advertising projects for Fortune 500 companies, including Corning, Bausch & Lomb, Xerox, Eastman Kodak and Dupont. His work has been awarded multiple national Clios, Addys, NAB Golden and Silver Microphones, three Golden Eagles from Cannes, and Gold Medals for Best of Show and Best Use of Music at the New York Film and Television Festival.
