= Joseph Mancuso =

American author (born 1941)

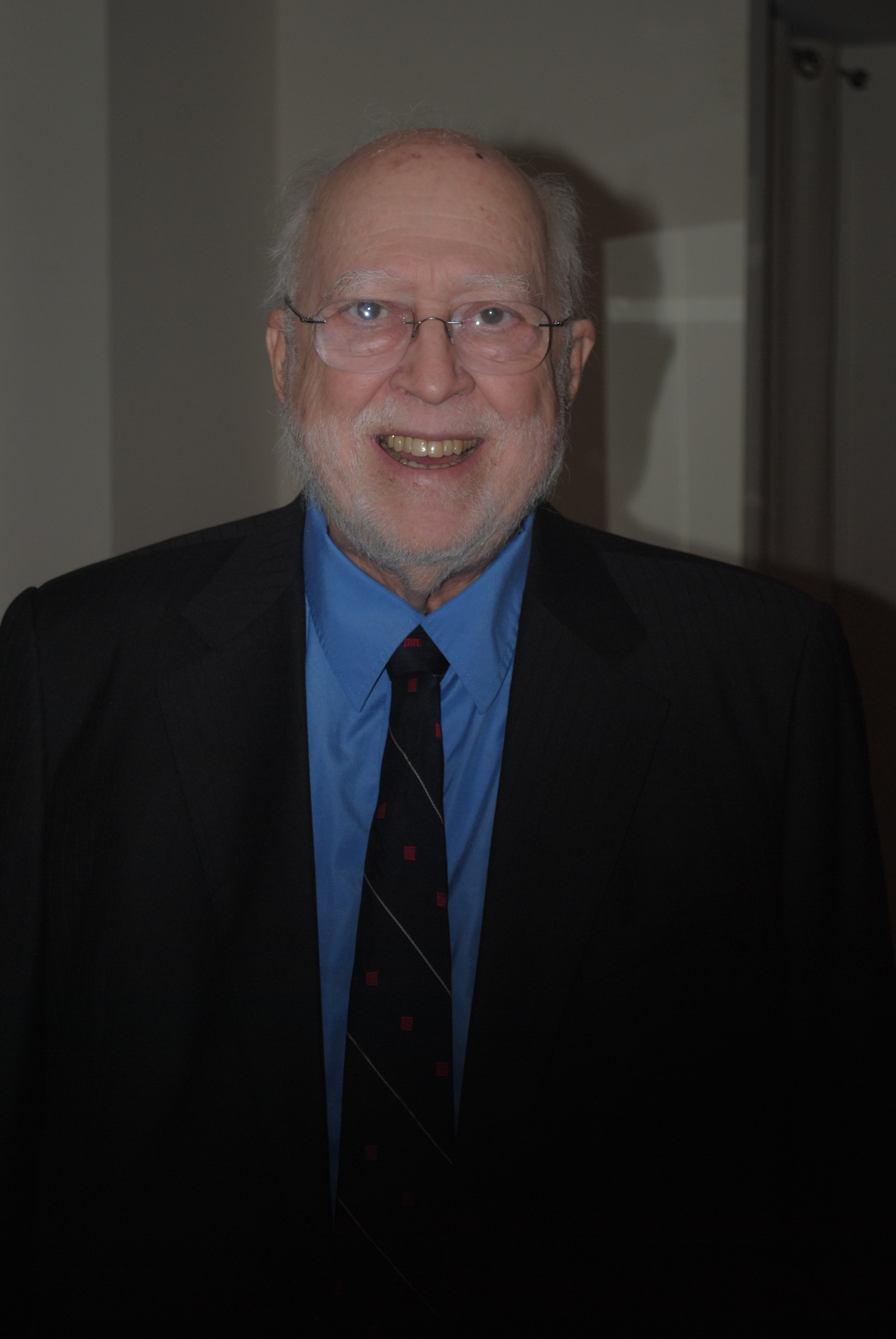
- Born: May 6, 1941; Hartford, Connecticut, United States
- Education: Worcester Polytechnic Institute, Harvard Business School, Boston University
- Occupations: Author, professional speaker, consultant, business-expert
- Known for: Founding the chief executive officer's Clubs
- Spouse: Karla Mancuso
- Children: 5

Joseph Mancuso (May 6, 1941 - October 16, 2024) was an American author, businessman and keynote speaker. He is known for writing 24 entrepreneurial books for entrepreneurs and CEOs.

Mancuso was also the founder, CEO and president of CEO Clubs International, a worldwide membership association of mid-market CEOs. He frequently traveled the world, opening new chapters, and speaking and doing consulting work with existing international CEO Clubs. He was a well-known business speaker and consultant in mainland China and Japan.

== Early life and education ==
Mancuso was born in Hartford, Connecticut in the United States in 1941. He earned a bachelor's degree in Electrical Engineering from Worcester Polytechnic Institute (WPI) in 1963. He then earned an M.B.A. from Harvard Business School in 1965, and a PhD Doctorate from Boston University in Educational Administration in 1975.

== CEO Clubs ==
Mancuso founded The chief executive officer's Clubs in 1977, and left his professorship at Worcester Polytechnic Institute in Massachusetts to run CEO Clubs full-time in 1978. The CEO Clubs are the world's oldest and largest non-profit business association for CEOs and entrepreneurs. The organization describes its purpose as 'CEOs making money and having fun while learning'. Mancuso also publishes the CEO Clubs chief executive officer newsletter.

== Personal life ==
Mancuso was married, with five children and six grandchildren. He resided in New York City at the time of his death.
