= Dennis D. Berkey =

Mathematician and college administrator

15th President of Worcester Polytechnic Institute
- In office July 1, 2004 – May 31, 2013
- Preceded by: Edward Alton Parrish
- Succeeded by: Laurie Leshin

Personal details
- Born: 1947 (age 78–79)
- Spouse: Catherine Berkey
- Education: Muskingum College; Miami University; University of Cincinnati
- Scientific career
- Fields: Mathematics
- Workplaces: Boston University; Worcester Polytechnic Institute
- Thesis: Diagonally-Dominant Linear-Systems (differential And Difference Systems) (1974)
- Doctoral advisor: Alan C. Lazar

Dennis D. Berkey is a mathematician and college administrator who was the 15th president of Worcester Polytechnic Institute (WPI) from 2004 to 2013. At WPI he oversaw the development of a biotechnology center known as Gateway Park in Worcester, Massachusetts. He also oversaw an expansion in enrollment, a new residence hall (East Hall), a new admissions building (The Bartlett Center), and a new sports and recreation facility.

== Education ==
Berkey received a B.A. degree in mathematics from Muskingum College in 1969 and a M.A. degree from Miami University in 1971. He earned a Ph.D. in mathematics from University of Cincinnati in 1974 while working under the supervision of Alan C. Lazar.

== Career ==
After receiving his doctorate, Berkey became a faculty member at Boston University in 1974. From 1978 to 1983, he chaired the mathematics department, and he served as dean of the College of Arts and Sciences from 1987 to 2002. He was the provost at BU from 1987 to 1991 and from 1996 to 2004.

Academic offices
Preceded by Edward Alton Parrish	15th President of Worcester Polytechnic Institute; 2004 – 2013	Succeeded by Laurie Leshin
