= Michele Grimm =

American biomechanical engineer

Michele J. Grimm
- Education: The Johns Hopkins University, University of Pennsylvania
- Known for: Biomechanics of injury, brachial plexus injuries in newborn children
- Awards: ASME Fellow (2010), Fellow of the American Institute for Medical and Biological Engineering, Fellow of the Biomedical Engineering Society, Theo C. Pilkington Outstanding Educator Award (2019), Robert M. Nerem Education and Mentorship Medal (2022)
- Scientific career
- Fields: Biomechanical engineering
- Workplaces: University at Albany, Michigan State University, Wayne State University, National Science Foundation
- Thesis: Ultrasound propagation through the calcaneus: Dependence on "bone quality" and prediction by Biot's theory (1995)
- Doctoral advisor: John Leicester Williams

Michele J. Grimm is a British-American biomechanical engineer. She took on the role of Dean of the College of Engineering and Applied Sciences (now the College of Nanotechnology, Science, and Engineering) at the University at Albany in 2022. She was previously the Wielenga Creative Engineering Endowed Professor of mechanical engineering and biomedical engineering at Michigan State University. Her research concerns the biomechanics of injury, particularly injuries in newborn children to the brachial plexus, a part of the nervous system connecting it to the upper body.

== Education and career ==
Grimm majored in biomedical engineering and engineering mechanics at The Johns Hopkins University, with a minor in French, graduating in 1990. She went to the University of Pennsylvania for graduate study in bioengineering, and earned a master's degree in 1992 and a Ph.D. in 1995. Her dissertation, Ultrasound propagation through the calcaneus: Dependence on "bone quality" and prediction by Biot's theory, was supervised by John Leicester Williams.

She joined the faculty at Wayne State University in 1994, and worked there for approximately 25 years before moving to Michigan State University in 2019 She also served as a program director at the National Science Foundation from 2016 to 2019.

== Recognition ==
Grimm was named as an ASME Fellow in 2010. In 2018, Grimm was elected as a fellow of the American Institute for Medical and Biological Engineering and of the Biomedical Engineering Society.

She was the 2019 winner of the Theo C. Pilkington Outstanding Educator Award of the Biomedical Engineering Division of the American Society for Engineering Education and the 2022 winner of the Robert M. Nerem Education and Mentorship Medal from the American Society of Mechanical Engineers.
