= Communesin B =

Names
- Preferred IUPAC name (2E,4E)-1-{(3aR,8aR,13bR,16aS,17S)-17-[(2R)-3,3-Dimethyloxiran-2-yl]-9-methyl-2,3,8a,9,14,15-hexahydro-8H-13,16-methanobenzo[c]indolo[3,2-j]pyrrolo[3,2-e][2,6]naphthyridin-1(16aH)-yl}hexa-2,4-dien-1-one

Identifiers
CAS Number	148439-46-7
3D model (JSmol)	Interactive image
ChemSpider	24713764
PubChem CID	44575539
CompTox Dashboard (EPA)	DTXSID001017735
- InChI: InChI=1S/C32H36N4O2/c1-5-6-7-15-24(37)35-18-16-31-21-12-8-9-13-22(21)33-28-32(31)17-19-36(29(31)35)26(27-30(2,3)38-27)20-11-10-14-23(25(20)32)34(28)4/h5-15,26-29,33H,16-19H2,1-4H3/b6-5+,15-7+/t26-,27+,28+,29+,31-,32-/m0/s1 Key: XZFSMUXVAYCHFO-RPCCRITPSA-N
- SMILES: C/C=C/C=C/C(=O)N1CC[C@]23[C@H]1N4CC[C@@]25c6c(cccc6N([C@H]5Nc7c3cccc7)C)[C@H]4[C@@H]8C(O8)(C)C

Properties
Chemical formula	C_{32}H_{36}N_{4}O_{2}
Molar mass	508.666 g·mol^{−1}
- Except where otherwise noted, data are given for materials in their standard state (at 25 °C [77 °F], 100 kPa). Infobox references

Communesin B is a cytotoxic chemical compound isolated from Penicillium strains found on the marine alga Ulva intestinalis. It exhibits cytotoxicity in vitro against human lung carcinoma, prostate carcinoma, colorectal carcinoma, cervical adenocarcinoma, and breast adenocarcinoma cell lines.

== Biosynthesis ==
Communesin B is a dimeric indole alkaloid with a hexadienoyl moiety originating from polyketide synthesis. Biosynthesis starts with two L-tryptophan molecules processed by different pathways. The first pathway involves a decarboxylation step catalyzed by CnsB to produce tryptamine. The second pathway starts the synthesis of 4-L-dimethylallyl tryptophan by CnsF followed by further processing of CnsA and CnsD to form aurantioclavine. These two indole-containing fragments are combined through a radical oxidative coupling by CnsC, a cytochrome P450 enzyme, to form the core scaffold of communesin alkaloids. CnsE transfers a methyl group to the indole nitrogen, and CnsJ creates an epoxide ring on the dimethylallyl substituent off the ring structure to form communesin I. Separately, CnsI synthesizes a hexadienoyl group using acetyl-CoA as a starting material and extending it with two malonyl-CoA units. Then, CnsK performs N-acylation with the CnsI-synthesized hexadienoyl chain to form communesin B.

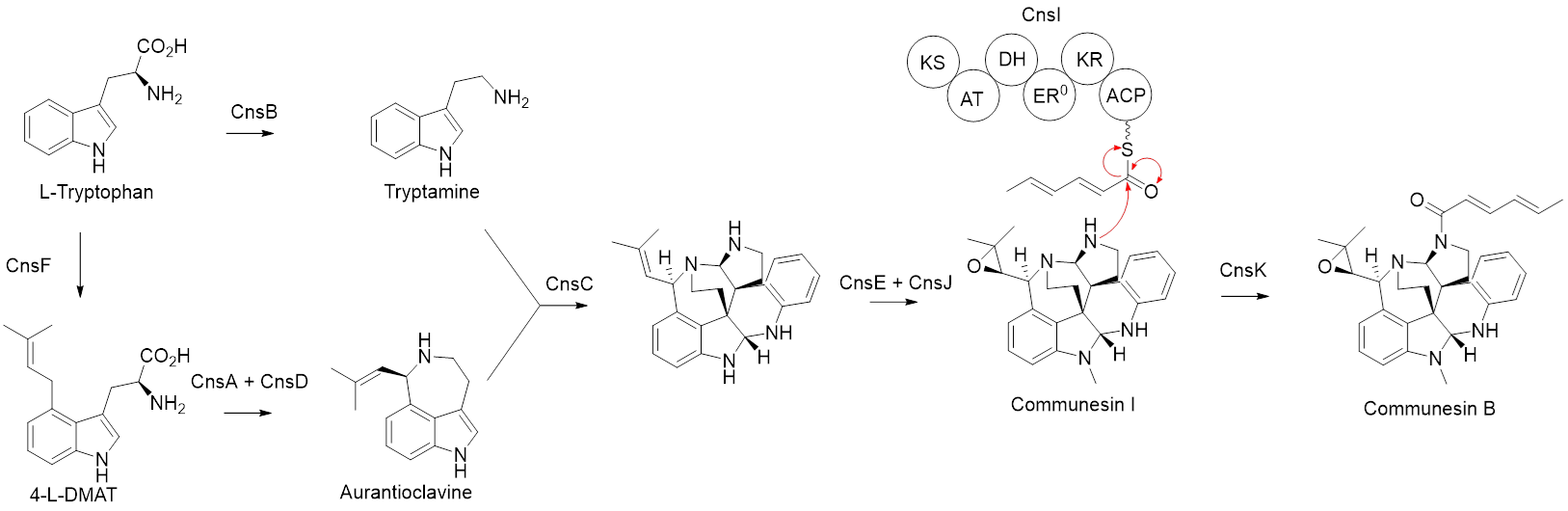
Biosynthesis of communesin B. Reproduction of Figure 18 from Wei X, Wang W, Matsuda Y (2002).
