= Edison Welding Institute =

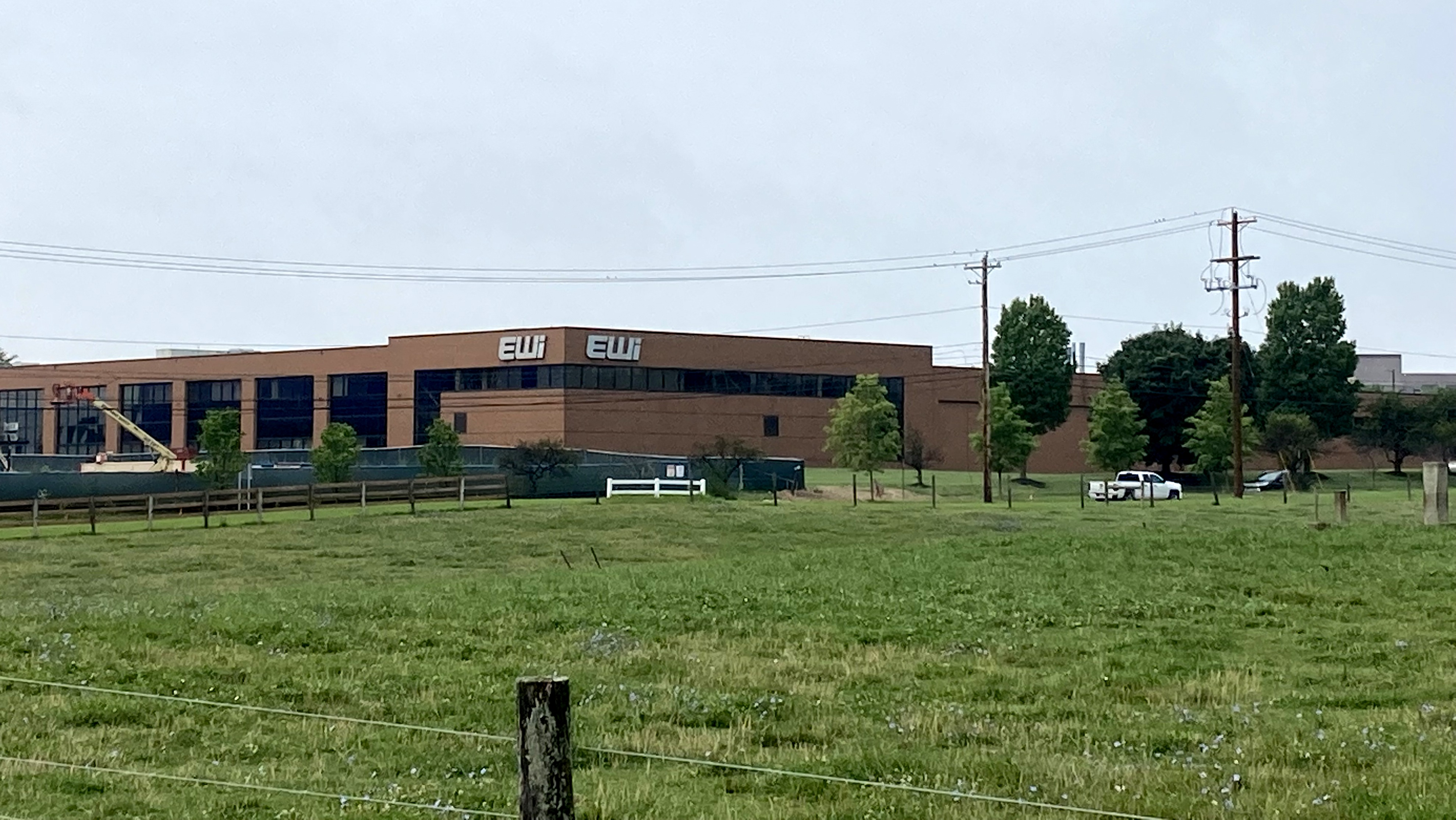
EWI headquarters

EWI, previously known as Edison Welding Institute, is a nonprofit engineering and technology organization dedicated to developing, testing, and implementing advanced manufacturing technologies for industry. Headquartered in Columbus, Ohio, EWI offers applied research, manufacturing support, and strategic services to leading manufacturers in the aerospace, automotive, defense, energy, government, heavy manufacturing, medical and electronics sectors.

== History ==
The organization was founded in 1984 when then Ohio Governor Richard Celeste established the Thomas Edison Program, an initiative to establish the Edison Technology Excellence Centers within the state, including a center for welding research and development.

Today EWI operates independently and is considered one of the leading engineering and technology innovator for advanced manufacturing in North America.

== Offices ==
EWI has offices and laboratories in Columbus, Ohio and Buffalo, New York. Approximately 150 employees staff the institute.

EWI holds numerous patents for various materials joining and manufacturing technologies.

== See also ==
- International Institute of Welding
