= Alain E. Kaloyeros =

American physicist

6th president and chief executive officer of the SUNY Polytechnic Institute
- In office January 13, 2015 – October 11, 2016
- Preceded by: Office created
- Succeeded by: Bahgat G. Sammakia

Personal details
- Born: Beirut, Lebanon
- Education: University of Illinois, Urbana-Champaign, PhD, Experimental Condensed Matter Physics, 1987
- Profession: Nanoscale engineering

Alain E. Kaloyeros (Greek: Αλεν Καλόγερος, Arabic: آلان كالوييروس, born 1956, Beirut) is an American physicist. He was the chief executive officer and sixth president of the SUNY Polytechnic Institute in Utica, New York.

== Early life and education ==
Kaloyeros was born in Beirut to a Lebanese mother and Greek father. His family is Greek Orthodox Christian. He attended Lebanese University and graduated with a License D’Enseignement in Mathematics and Physics with honors and left Lebanon in 1980 for graduate school in Florida at the University of Miami, and he transferred to the University of Illinois, Urbana-Champaign. Kaloyeros graduated from The University of Illinois, Urbana-Champaign with a doctorate in Experimental Condensed Matter Physics in 1987 with a perfect grade point average of 5.000/5.000. Kaloyeros has authored and co-authored over 200 scientific articles in technical journals and contributed to 8 books on topics pertaining to the science and technology of nanotechnology, nanoelectronics, nano-optoelectronics, nano-medicine, and green energy. His technical focus was in ultrathin film materials and structures, atomic layer vapor phase deposition processes, and nanoscale x-ray, electron, and photon-based characterization and metrology. He advised more than 36 Ph.D. and over 100 Masters students. His work has been referenced in over 4,700 citations by his peers in scientific and technical publications. He was awarded 14 U.S. and international patents.

== Career ==
Kaloyeros was a professor in the University at Albany's physics department from 1988 until 2009 when the nanotechnology research center was spun-off from the department into a separate SUNY college. He was a Professor of Nanoscience at the SUNY Poly Colleges of Nanoscale Science and Engineering (CNSE) at University at Albany, SUNY.

In January 2015, he was appointed the sixth president of SUNY Polytechnic Institute (SUNY Poly). He served as the Executive Director of the Center of Excellence in Nanoelectronics, the Interconnect Focus Center – New York, the Energy/Environment Technologies Applications Center, and the New York State Center for Advanced Thin Film Technology.

== Legal issues ==
In September 2016, Kaloyeros was charged with felony bid rigging. He was then suspended from his job as SUNY Polytechnic Institute's President.

On July 12, 2018, Kaloyeros was found guilty of wire fraud and conspiracy in a federal trial in Manhattan. The judge, Valerie E. Caproni, scheduled the sentencing dates in October. The case is being appealed to the U.S. second circuit. Following the verdict, the State University of New York announced that it would seek his removal from his tenured faculty position.

After delays due to poor health, Kaloyeros began serving time in a federal prison in February 2022. He was released on July 2, 2022 (along with three other men - Joseph Geraldi, Steven Aiello and Louis Ciminelli) after serving about five months in prison.

On May 15, 2023, in a unanimous decision, the Supreme Court of the United States overturned Kaloyeros's conviction.

== Personal life ==
Kaloyeros is married to Jessica Kaloyeros. Kaloyeros is divorced from Paula Kaloyeros who he had two sons with, Nicholas and Alexander. He lives in Guilderland, New York, a suburb of Albany.

== See also ==
- Condensed matter physics
- New York Governor Andrew Cuomo
