= SUNY Polytechnic Institute =

Polytechnic university in Marcy, New York

State University of New York Polytechnic Institute
- Former names: Upper Division College at Herkimer/Rome/Utica (1966–1977); State University of New York College of Technology at Utica–Rome (1977–1989); State University of New York Institute of Technology at Utica–Rome (1989–2014)
- Type: Public university
- Established: June 14, 1966; 60 years ago
- Parent institution: State University of New York
- President: Winston (Wole) Soboyejo
- Provost: Andrew Russell
- Students: 2,891 (fall 2025)
- Undergraduates: 2,181 (fall 2025)
- Postgraduates: 710 (fall 2025)
- Location: Marcy, New York, U.S. 43.134°N 75.229°W
- Campus: Suburban, urban, 762 acres (308 ha), Marcy campus
- Colors: Blue, white, gold
- Nickname: Wildcats
- Sporting affiliations: NCAA Division III, Empire 8
- Mascot: Walter T. Wildcat
- Website: sunypoly.edu

The State University of New York Polytechnic Institute (SUNY Polytechnic Institute or SUNY Poly) is a public university in Marcy, New York, in the Utica–Rome metropolitan area. It is part of the State University of New York (SUNY) system, serving as its institute of technology. The institution was established as the Upper Division College at Herkimer/Rome/Utica in 1966.

SUNY Poly is accredited by the Middle States Commission on Higher Education. The university has programs in the disciplines of engineering, engineering technology, and other programs and degrees in business administration, technology, nursing, design, professional studies, and the arts and sciences. It offers undergraduate and graduate study, and a Doctor of Nursing Practice in Psychiatric Mental Health.

== History ==
The university was initially established in 1966 as a graduate and upper-division (transfer) institution known as the Upper Division College at Herkimer/Rome/Utica. Beginning in 1969 the school offered classes in temporary locations such as classrooms at an elementary school and a disused mill building, and at extension sites for several years until the first buildings were constructed on the permanent Marcy campus in the 1980s. After a decade of growing enrollment, the school took on a new name in 1977, the State University of New York College of Technology at Utica–Rome. A decade later, in 1987, the school finally moved to its present location in Marcy and, two years later in 1989, changed its name again, becoming the State University of New York Institute of Technology at Utica–Rome (SUNYIT).

In 2002, the SUNY Board of Trustees approved a mission change, enabling SUNYIT to add lower-division programs in professional, technological, and applied studies to its upper-division offerings. In 2003, SUNYIT admitted its first class of freshmen, becoming a four-year institution.

=== SUNY Poly ===
The university adopted its current name, State University of New York Polytechnic Institute, with the 2014 merger of the SUNY Institute of Technology in Utica and the College of Nanoscale Science and Engineering, previously part of the University at Albany. This merger created five colleges within the institute: the College of Arts & Sciences, the College of Engineering, the College of Health Sciences, the College of Business Management, and the College of Nanoscale Science and Engineering. This was part of a larger effort by state government to create a nanotechnology hub in the Mohawk Valley.

In September 2016, SUNY Poly president Alain E. Kaloyeros was charged with felony bid rigging. He was consequently suspended as president without pay. Kaloyeros was convicted in 2018, but the Supreme Court of the United States overturned Kaloyeros's conviction in 2023.

In its 2016 tax filings, SUNY Poly disclosed investments in a number of box-office bombs produced by Ron Perlman, including a $750,000 investment in Pottersville.

In 2022, semiconductor manufacturer Wolfspeed opened a plant at the Marcy Nanocenter at SUNY Polytechnic Institute.

In December 2022, the SUNY Board of Trustees voted to return the College of Nanoscale Science and Engineering (CNSE) to the University at Albany. The transfer was completed in August 2023. Several academic programs and about 90 students, 29 faculty and lecturers, and more than 100 other staff transferred from Utica to Albany.

== Campus ==
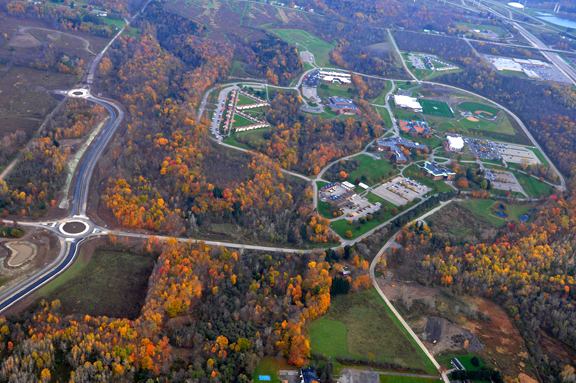
Aerial view of the SUNY Polytechnic campus

The campus is in the town of Marcy.

The college campus occupies more than 400 acres, with major buildings, including four residential complexes, surrounded by trees and green landscape. The "west campus" property of more than 300 acres is reserved for the development of the Marcy NanoCenter. Construction and renovation projects totaling $100 million in recent years included a new student center, field house, and residence hall complex—all completed in 2011.

There are two academic halls on campus: William R. Kunsela Hall and James H. Donovan Hall. Opened in March 2003, the Peter J. Cayan Library is on the southern portion of the campus.

== Academics ==
Undergraduate demographics as of Fall 2023
Race and ethnicity	Total
White	66%
Hispanic	11%
Black	10%
Asian	8%
Two or more races	3%
International student	1%
Economic diversity
Low-income (Note: The percentage of students who received an income-based federal Pell grant intended for low-income students.)	40%
Affluent (Note: The percentage of students who are a part of the American middle class at the bare minimum.)	60%

SUNY Poly is organized into four colleges:

- College of Arts & Sciences
- College of Business Management
- College of Engineering
- College of Health Sciences

== Residence halls ==
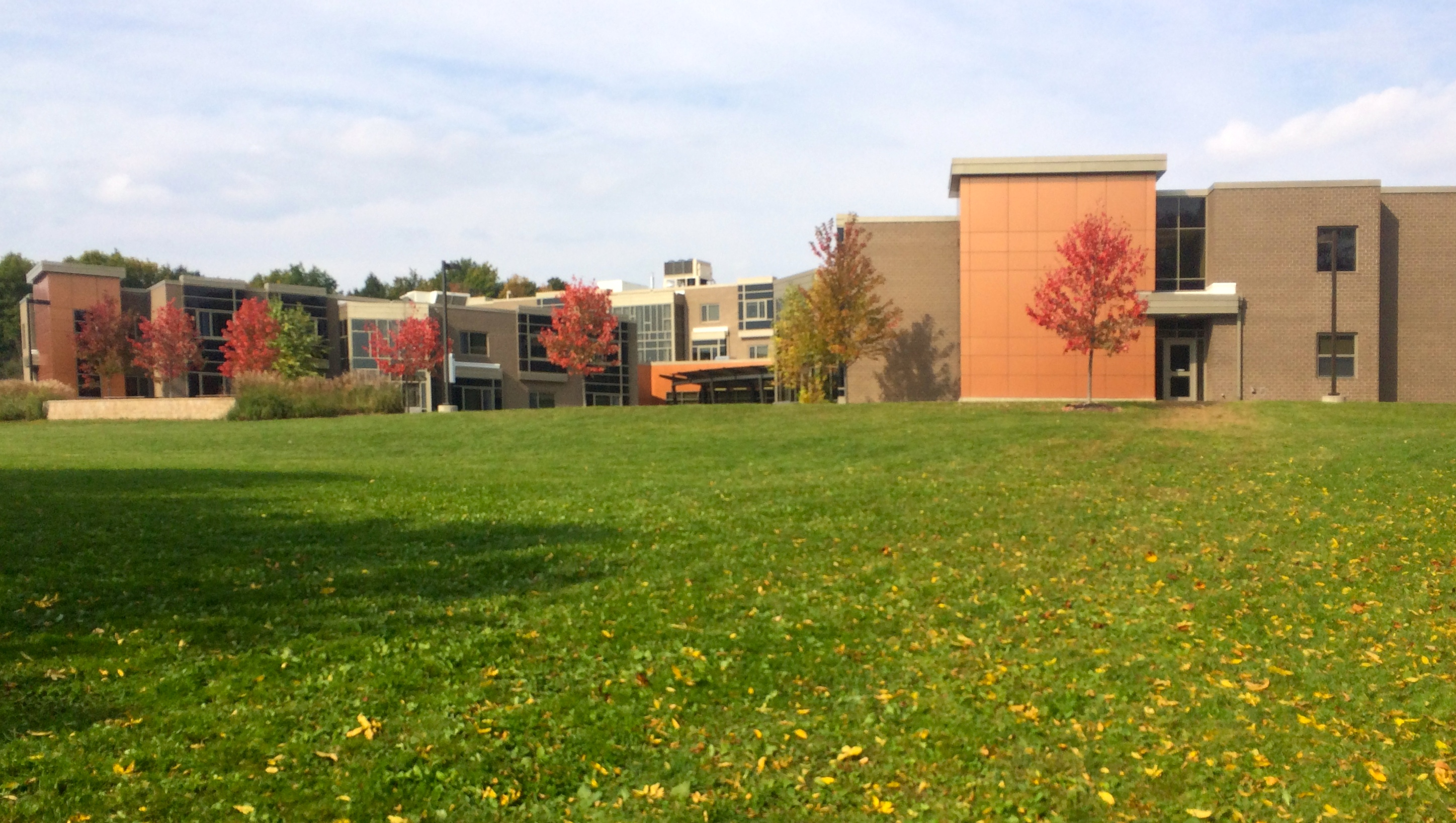
Oriskany Residence Hall

Four residence halls are on the college campus, including the oldest, Adirondack Residence Hall, Mohawk Residence Hall, constructed in the late-1990s and located on the northern portion of campus, Oriskany Residence Hall, completed in 2011, and Hilltop residence Hall, completed in 2020. In 2019, SUNY Poly broke ground on its next residence hall, opened in the fall 2020 semester. The residence hall is designed to be "zero-net, carbon certified," exceeding existing energy codes with the infrastructure to add future on-site renewable energy production systems. Once these systems are installed, the building will use equal to or less than the energy annually it can produce on-site through renewable resources.

== Athletics ==
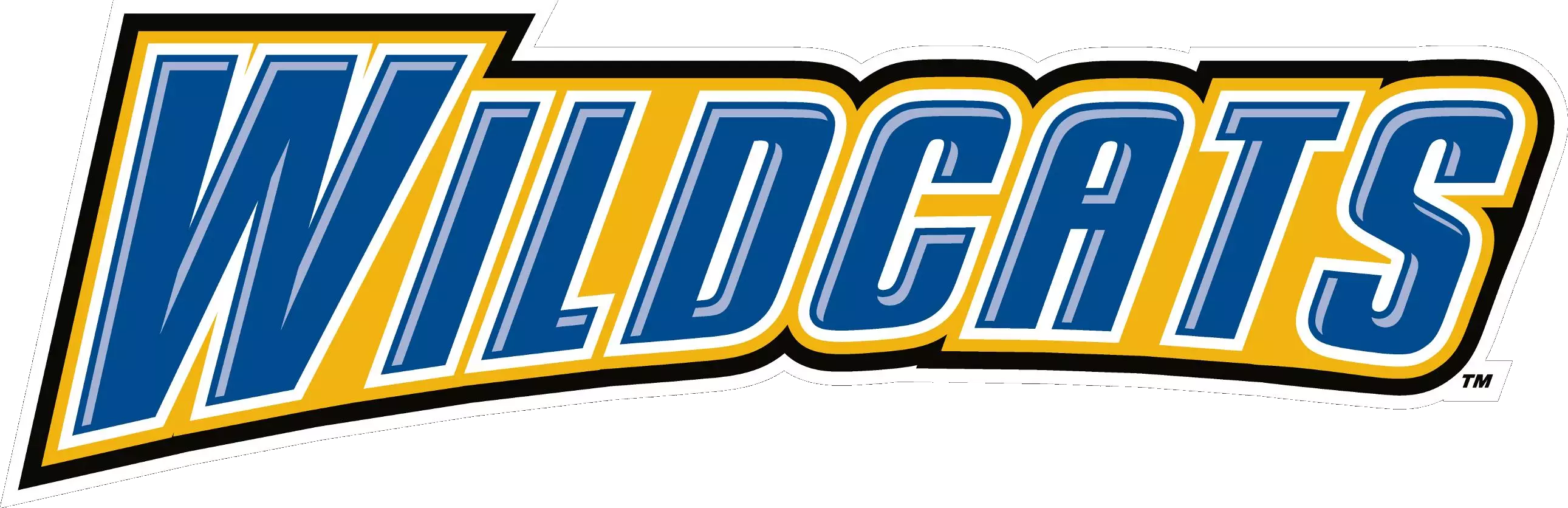
SUNY Poly athletics wordmark

SUNY Poly is a member of the National Collegiate Athletic Association (NCAA) Division III and the Empire 8 Conference. The current roster of SUNY Poly varsity sports includes baseball, softball, and men's and women's basketball, cross country, lacrosse, soccer, volleyball, and golf. SUNY Poly's athletic nickname is the Wildcats.

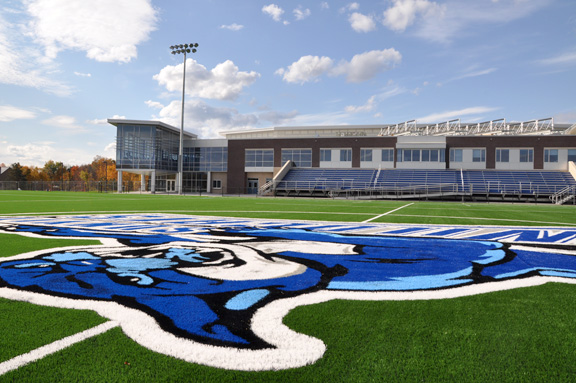
SUNYIT Wildcats Field House

The Wildcat Field House, completed in 2011, features a state-of-the-art fitness center, two full-sized basketball courts and four volleyball courts, indoor practice facilities for all Wildcat teams, a running track, an expansive training room, team rooms, and offices for the athletics department's administrative staff and coaches. A new multi-sport turf field, new baseball field, and an updated softball field were also constructed as part of the Wildcat Field House project. The SUNY Poly basketball teams play their home contests in the Campus Center Gym. The "CC" was completed in the early 1980s as the original home for Wildcat Athletics. Upon the completion of the Wildcat Field House, the Campus Center was retrofitted to be used solely for basketball. The most recent update to the gym was in 2016 when the scoreboard was updated and the floor and paint were refinished to match the current team identity.

In the 2020–21 season, the Wildcats changed conferences, transitioning from the North Eastern Athletic Conference (NEAC) to the North Atlantic Conference (NAC). For the 2024–2025 season, the Wildcats changed conferences, transitioning from the North Atlantic Conference (NAC) to the Empire 8 Conference.

The Wildcats also compete in esports. In 2022, a 'Drone Soccer Championship' was held at SUNY Poly.
