= School of Mathematics, Peking University =

Mathematics faculty of Peking University, China

School of Mathematical Sciences, Peking University
- 北京大学数学科学学院
- Former names: Department of Mathematics and Mechanics (1952–1978); Department of Mathematics (1978–1995)
- Type: Public
- Established: 1995; 31 years ago
- Parent institution: Peking University
- Dean: Liu Ruochuan
- Location: No. 5 Yiheyuan Road, Haidian District, Beijing, China
- Website: www.math.pku.edu.cn

The School of Mathematical Sciences (SMS; Chinese: 北京大学数学科学学院; pinyin: Běijīng Dàxué Shùxué Kēxué Xuéyuàn) is the mathematics faculty of Peking University in Beijing, China. Its predecessor, established at the university in 1912 and admitting its first students the following year, was the first mathematics department in China. The unit absorbed the mathematics departments of Tsinghua University and Yenching University in the national reorganisation of Chinese higher education in 1952, and took its present form in 1995, when the Department of Mathematics and the Department of Probability and Statistics were combined into a school.

Mathematicians who have taught at the school include the topologist Jiang Zehan and the statistician Pao-Lu Hsu, who introduced the teaching of probability and statistics to China. Its alumni include Yitang Zhang and the 2026 Fields Medal recipients Hong Wang and Yu Deng, who entered the school in the same 2007 cohort.

== History ==
=== Foundation ===
A mathematics division was created at Peking University in 1912 with two professors, Feng Zuxun and Hu Junji, and admitted its first two students in 1913. Feng, who had been sent by the university to study in Japan and graduated from Kyoto Imperial University in 1909, was the first Chinese person to complete a full university education in mathematics; he taught the analytical courses while Hu taught geometry and number theory. Two further professors joined in 1917, by which time the department had seven staff, more than twenty students and a dozen courses on offer. A second mathematics department was not founded in China until 1920, at Nankai University. In 1919 the university replaced its divisions with departments, and mathematics was listed first among them.

The department was a destination for several early foreign visitors to Chinese mathematics. Wilhelm Blaschke lectured there for two weeks in 1932 and afterwards recommended Emanuel Sperner, who spent two years at the university teaching foundations of geometry and topology and supervising graduate students; at that time the department had about seventy undergraduates and four graduate students. Jiang Zehan, who had taken a doctorate at Harvard University under Marston Morse, was appointed a professor in 1931 and head of department in 1934. He arranged a visit by George D. Birkhoff in 1934 and invited William Fogg Osgood, who taught at the university from 1934 to 1936; Osgood's lecture notes, prepared with the assistance of Pao-Lu Hsu, were published by Peking University.

After the outbreak of the Second Sino-Japanese War the mathematics departments of Peking University, Tsinghua University and Nankai University combined to form the mathematics department of the National Southwestern Associated University in Kunming. Hsu, who had returned from the University of London with a doctorate in 1938, was appointed a professor at Peking University and taught the first courses in probability and statistics offered in China, beginning in Kunming in the early 1940s.

=== 1952 reorganisation ===
In the autumn of 1952, as part of a nationwide restructuring of Chinese higher education along Soviet lines, the mathematics departments of Peking University, Tsinghua University and Yenching University were merged to form the Department of Mathematics and Mechanics at Peking University. Duan Xuefu, previously head of mathematics at Tsinghua, led the combined department until 1981. The undergraduate curriculum, syllabus and textbooks were modelled on those of Moscow State University.

When probability and statistics were designated national priority subjects in 1956, an accelerated training programme was set up at the department for students drawn from Peking, Nankai and Sun Yat-sen universities, with Hsu as its leader; the curriculum he devised became the national standard, and graduates were dispatched to teach elsewhere in China. A teaching and research unit in probability theory and mathematical statistics, the first of its kind in the country, was established in the department in the same year under Hsu's direction. Teaching was suspended during the Cultural Revolution and resumed in 1978.

=== Formation of the school ===
The mechanics staff separated into their own department in 1978, after which the unit reverted to the name Department of Mathematics. The Peking University Institute of Mathematics was founded in 1980 and operates jointly with the teaching departments. Hsu's probability and statistics unit became an independent department in 1985. In 1995 the two departments were combined to establish the School of Mathematical Sciences, with the topologist Jiang Boju as its first dean.

The Beijing International Center for Mathematical Research (BICMR), a separate research centre directed by Tian Gang, was established at the university in 2005, the Center for Statistical Science in 2010 and the Sino-Russian Mathematics Center in 2020.

== Organisation ==
The school is organised into four teaching departments: Mathematics; Probability and Statistics; Information and Computational Science; and Financial Mathematics. The Peking University Institute of Mathematics is integrated with the school under a combined school–institute structure, and attached research units include the Ministry of Education Key Laboratory of Mathematics and Its Applications, the National Engineering Laboratory for Big Data Analysis and Application Technology, and the Peking University Center for Statistical Science. BICMR is a distinct centre within the university rather than a part of the school, though the two share teaching duties and jointly supervise students.

=== Deans and heads ===
The department was led by Jiang Zehan (1934–1952), Duan Xuefu (1952–1981), Ding Shisun (1981–1982), Deng Donggao (1982–1987), Li Zhong (1987–1991) and Ying Long'an (1991–1995). Since the school's creation the deans have been Jiang Boju (1995–1998), Zhang Jiping (1998–2008), Wang Changping (2008–2013), Tian Gang (2013–2017) and Chen Dayue (2017–2026). In January 2026 Liu Ruochuan, who two months earlier had become the youngest member elected to the Chinese Academy of Sciences, succeeded Chen as dean.

== Academics ==
The school offers undergraduate majors in mathematics and applied mathematics, information and computational science, statistics, applied statistics (biostatistics), and data science and big-data technology, and doctoral programmes in pure mathematics, computational mathematics, probability and mathematical statistics, applied mathematics and statistics. It hosts postdoctoral stations in mathematics and in statistics. Undergraduates take a common curriculum for their first two years before choosing a major.

Peking University was ranked joint 13th in the world for mathematics in the 2025 QS World University Rankings by subject.

== Notable people ==
=== Faculty ===
- Feng Zuxun (1880–1940), the department's first head and the first Chinese graduate in mathematics from a foreign university
- Jiang Zehan (1902–1994), topologist, professor from 1931 and head of department from 1934
- Pao-Lu Hsu (1910–1970), who founded the teaching of probability and statistics in China and was elected an academician in 1948 and 1955
- Jiang Boju (born 1937), topologist, on the faculty from 1957 and the school's first dean
- Tian Gang (born 1958), geometer, professor at the university since 1991, dean from 2013 to 2017 and director of BICMR
- Weinan E (born 1963), applied mathematician, professor in the school and in the university's Center for Machine Learning Research
- Bin Dong (born 1981), professor at BICMR working on AI for Mathematics and scientific computing
- Xinyi Yuan (born 1981), number theorist, who moved from the University of California, Berkeley to Peking University in 2020
- Liu Ruochuan (born 1980), specialist in p-adic Hodge theory and dean since 2026
- Wei Dongyi (born 1992), analyst, who became widely discussed in Chinese social media in 2021

=== Alumni ===
- Wang Xuan (1937–2006), computer scientist, in the first cohort of the computational mathematics programme
- Yitang Zhang (born 1955), number theorist; BSc 1982, MSc 1984 under Pan Chengbiao
- Tian Gang (born 1958), master's degree 1984
- Chenyang Xu (born 1981), algebraic geometer, professor at Princeton University
- Wei Zhang (born 1981) and Zhiwei Yun (born 1982), professors at the Massachusetts Institute of Technology
- Xinwen Zhu (born 1982), geometric representation theorist; BSc 2004
- Hong Wang (born 1991), Fields Medallist; BSc 2011
- Yu Deng (born 1989), Fields Medallist; entered the school in 2007 before transferring to MIT

=== "Golden generation" ===
Students who entered the school around 2000, among them Chenyang Xu, Zhiwei Yun, Wei Zhang, Xinwen Zhu, Xinyi Yuan and Liu Ruochuan, have been described in Chinese and international coverage as a "golden generation" of Chinese mathematicians. Several were friends as undergraduates and later collaborated from posts in the United States; Quanta Magazine profiled four of them in 2015 as an informal quartet working on the relationship between L-functions and arithmetic geometry. Members of the group have received the SASTRA Ramanujan Prize, New Horizons in Mathematics Prizes and the Clay Research Award, and several have since taken up positions at Peking University.

=== 2026 Fields Medals ===
At the International Congress of Mathematicians in Philadelphia on 23 July 2026, Hong Wang and Yu Deng were among the four recipients of the Fields Medal. Both had entered the school in the 2007 cohort, making it the first occasion on which two mathematicians who began their undergraduate studies in mainland China received the medal in the same year. Wang was recognised for her proof with Joshua Zahl of the three-dimensional Kakeya conjecture and Deng for work with Zaher Hani and Xiao Ma on Hilbert's sixth problem.

== See also ==
- Peking University
- Chinese Mathematical Society
