= SMS1 =

SMS1 may refer to:

- Sphingomyelin synthase, an enzyme
- SMS-1, weather satellite, part of the NASA program Synchronous Meteorological Satellite

== See also ==
- SMS (disambiguation)
