= SMS2 =

SMS2 may refer to:

- Sphingomyelin synthase, an enzyme
- Small Multitasking System 2
- SMS-2 weather satellite

== See also ==
- SMS (disambiguation)
