= Boju =

Boju may refer to:

- Boju, a village in Cojocna Commune, Cluj County, Romania
- Bójú (亳菊), variety of chrysanthemum tea originating in Bozhou district, Anhui, China
- Boju (柏舉), locality in present-day Macheng, Hubei Province, China where the Battle of Boju was fought

People with the given name Boju include:

- Zhao Boju (1120–1182), Chinese painter of the early Southern Song dynasty
- Jiang Boju (born 1937), Chinese mathematician
