= SMS games =

SMS games may refer to:

- Super Mario Sunshine, 2002 video game
- List of Master System games, for Sega's home video game console
- Short Messaging System games, see text messaging

== See also ==
- SMS (disambiguation)
