= SMS (disambiguation) =

SMS stands for Short Message Service, a text message communication standard.

SMS may also refer to:

== Science and technology ==
=== Computing and electronics ===
- Supervisor Monitoring Scheduler, a Unix/Linux job scheduler
- Systems Management Server, later System Center Configuration Manager, by Microsoft
- Data Facility Storage Management Subsystem (MVS), a central component of z/OS, optional in some older forms of MVS
- System Managed Storage, a facility in DFSMS/MVS
- Scientific Micro Systems, producer of the SMS300 microcontroller
- SMS Audio, a US headphone manufacturer
- Standard Modular System, a packaging standard for IBM second generation (discrete transistor) computers prior to the S/360
- Sudden Motion Sensor, on Apple notebook computers
- Spectral modeling synthesis, an acoustic modeling approach
- SMS (hydrology software), surface-water modeling software

=== Biology and medicine ===
- SMS (gene), which encodes the spermine synthase enzyme
- Stiff-man syndrome (primarily known as stiff-person syndrome), a neurological disorder
- Smith–Magenis syndrome, a genetic developmental disorder
- Serotonin modulator and stimulator, a type of drug

=== Other uses in science and technology ===
- Synchronous Meteorological Satellite, a NASA program
- Simultaneous multiple surface, in non-imaging optics

== Arts, entertainment, and education ==
=== Movies, music, and education ===
- Siva Manasula Sakthi, a 2009 Tamil film
- Siva Manasulo Sruthi, a 2012 Telugu film
- SMS (2008 film), a Malayalam-language Indian film
- Stop Making Sense, a 1984 concert film by Talking Heads
- SMS (band), a Ukrainian pop band
- "SMS" (Bangerz), a song from the Miley Cyrus album Bangerz
- S. M. Subbaiah Naidu, an Indian music director
- Special Music School, New York City, US
- Saint Mary's School (Raleigh, North Carolina), US
- Shawnee Mission South High School, in the Shawnee Mission School District, Kansas
- School of Mathematical Sciences, Peking University, a university department

=== Gaming ===
- Sega Master System, video game console
- Super Mario Sunshine, video game
- Santa Monica Studio, an American video game developer

=== Other uses in arts and entertainment ===
- SMS (illustrator), British comic book illustrator
- S.M.S. portfolios, a collection of artist's portfolios conceived by William Copley and Dimitri Petrov, published 1968
- Shorty McShorts, the host of Shorty McShorts' Shorts
- SMS: Sin Miedo a Soñar, Spanish television series

== Transportation and military ==
- Safety management system in some workplaces, primarily in the aviation industry
- Sainte Marie Airport (IATA code), Madagascar
- Scheduled Maintenance System, of New York City Subway rolling stock
- Seiner Majestät Schiff (His Majesty's Ship), ship prefix in various German navies
- Schiffe Menschen Schicksale, German naval and maritime history magazine
- Marine Service Squadron

== Political parties ==
- Party of Modern Serbia (Serbian: Странка модерне Србије, romanized: Stranka moderne Srbije)
- Youth Party of Slovenia (Slovene: Stranka mladih Slovenije)

== Sports ==
- Sergej Milinković-Savić, Serbian football player
- Sawai Mansingh Stadium, a cricket stadium in India

== Other uses ==
- Skolt Sami language (ISO 639 alpha-3 language code)
- SMS, nonwoven fabrics with spun and melted layers
- Swedish Mathematical Society
- Saskatchewan Marshals Service, a provincial law enforcement agency created in 2025

== See also ==
- SM (disambiguation)
