= Pleurotolysin =

Pleurotolysin B

Identifiers
- Symbol: plyB
- Pfam: PF01823
- InterPro: IPR020864
- PROSITE: PS51412
- TCDB: 1.C.97.
Available protein structures:
- PDB: 4OEJ IPR020864 PF01823 (ECOD; PDBsum)
- AlphaFold: IPR020864; PF01823

Pleurotolysin (TC# 1.C.97.1.1), a sphingomyelin-specific cytolysin. Its A (17 kDa; Q8X1M9) and B (59 kDa; Q5W9E8) components are assembled into a transmembrane pore complex. The Pleurotolysin Pore-Forming (Pleurotolysin) Family (TC# 1.C.97) is a family of pore forming proteins belonging to the MACPF superfamily.

== Function ==
Proteins with membrane-attack complex/perforin (MACPF) domains have a variety of biological roles, including defense and attack, organismal development, and cell adhesion and signaling. The distribution of these proteins in fungi appears to be restricted to some Pezizomycotina and Basidiomycota species only, in correlation with the aegerolysins (PF06355). These two protein groups coincide in only a few species, and they operate as cytolytic bi-component pore-forming agents. Representative proteins include pleurotolysin B, which has a MACPF domain, the aegerolysin-like protein pleurotolysin A, and the very similar ostreolysin A (TC# 1.C.97.3.2) that has been purified from oyster mushroom (Pleurotus ostreatus). These act in concert to perforate natural and artificial lipid membranes with high cholesterol and sphingomyelin contents. The complex has a 13-meric rosette-like structure with a central lumen that is ~ 4-5 nm in diameter. The opened transmembrane pore is non-selectively permeable to ions and smaller neutral solutes, and is a cause of cytolysis of a colloid-osmotic type.

== Research ==
Sakurai et al. 2004 cloned complementary and genomic DNAs encoding pleurotolysin, and studied pore-forming properties of recombinant proteins. Recombinant pleurotolysin A lacking the first methionine was purified as a 17-kDa protein with sphingomyelin-binding activity. The cDNA for pleurotolysin B encoded a precursor consisting of 523 amino acyl residues, of which 48 N-terminal amino acyl residues were absent in natural pleurotolysin B. Mature and precursor forms of pleurotolysin B were expressed as insoluble 59- and 63-kDa proteins, respectively. Although neither recombinant pleurotolysin A nor B alone was hemolytically active at higher concentrations of up to 100 mg/ml, they cooperatively assembled into a membrane pore complex on human erythrocytes and lysed the cell.

== Homologues ==
In this TC family, both constituents of pleurotolysin and ostreolysin (A and B) are included under TC#s 1.C.97.1.1 and 1.C.97.1.2, respectively. However, homologues of Pleurotolysin B are found under TC#s 1.C.97.1.3 - 1.C.97.1.9 while homologues of Pleurotolysin A are found under TC#s 1.C.97.2.1 - 1.C.97.2.4 and TC#s 1.C.97.3.1 - 1.C.97.3.8. Pleurotolysins A are not homologous to Pleurotolysins B. While some homologues depend on the presence of both constituents for pore formation, as noted for both pleurotolysin and ostreolysin, some homologues of both A and B can form pores without the other. While Pleurotolysin B is in the MACPF superfamily (TC# 1.C.39) while Pleurotolysin A is in the Aegerolysin superfamily.

=== Erylysin ===
Another two-component hemolysin, erylysin A and B (EryA and EryB; TC# 1.C.97.1.2), was isolated from an edible mushroom, Pleurotus eryngii. Hemolytic activity was exhibited only by the EryA and EryB mixture.

== Aegerolysin ==
While Pleurotolysin B is in the MACPF superfamily (TC# 1.C.39), Pleurotolysin A is in the Aegerolysin superfamily. Several members of the Aegerolysin family have been used as tools to detect and visualize ceramide phosphoethanolamine, a major sphingolipid in invertebrates but not in animals. It may be distantly related to members of the Equinatoxin Family (TC# 1.C.38).

The aegerolysin family consists of several bacterial and eukaryotic aegerolysin-like proteins. It has been found that aegerolysin and ostreolysin are expressed during formation of primordia and fruiting bodies and possibly play a role in the initial phase of fungal fruiting. The bacterial members of this family are expressed during sporulation. Ostreolysin is cytolytic to various erythrocytes and tumor cells because of pore formation. Several members of the Aegerolysin family have been used as tools to detect and visualize ceramide phosphoethanolamine, a major sphingolipid in invertebrates but not in animals. It may be distantly related to members of the Equinatoxin Family (TC# 1.C.38).
