= Leetsch C. Hsu =

Chinese mathematician and educator (1920–2019)

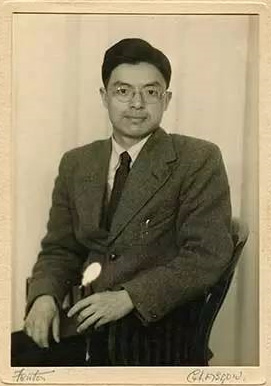
Leetsch C. Hsu in Glasgow, 1950

Xu Lizhi (Chinese: 徐利治; Wade–Giles: Hsü Li-chih; 23 September 1920 – 11 March 2019), better known as Leetsch Charles Hsu, was a Chinese mathematician and educator. He co-founded the Department of Mathematics of Jilin University and founded the Institute of Applied Mathematics and the Journal of Mathematical Research with Applications at the Dalian University of Technology. Together with American mathematician Henry W. Gould, he established the Gould–Hsu Matrix Inversion Formula in 1973.

== Early life and education ==
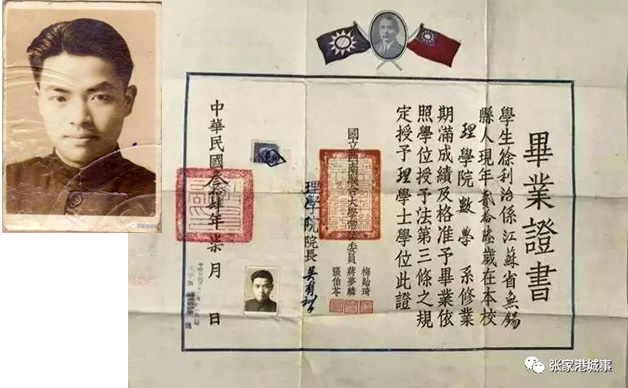
Hsu's diploma from National Southwestern Associated University

Hsu was born on 23 September 1920 in Zhangjiagang, Jiangsu, Republic of China. His original name was Xu Quanyong (徐泉涌).

Hsu studied at Jiangsu Provincial Luoshe Normal School before the outbreak of the Second Sino-Japanese War. In 1940, he passed the entrance examination for the temporary National Southwestern Associated University formed by Tsinghua and other universities in Kunming, and studied mathematics under Hua Luogeng and Pao-Lu Hsu. Upon graduation in 1945, he was hired by the university as a teaching assistant to Hua.

== Career ==
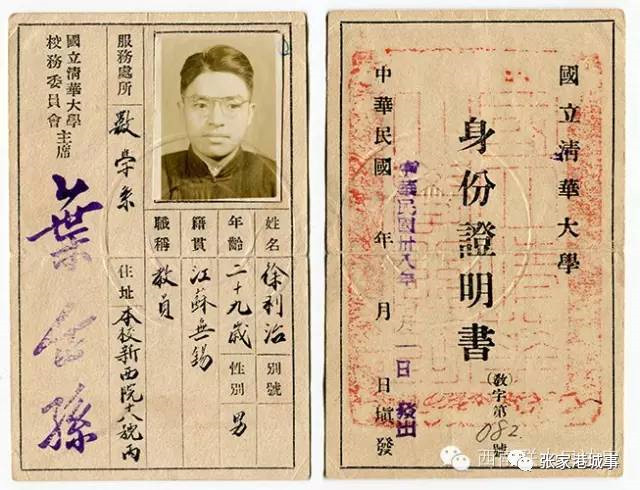
Hsu's faculty ID issued by Tsinghua University

After the end of the Sino-Japanese War, National Southwestern Associated University was disbanded in 1946 and Hsu joined Tsinghua University, which had been reestablished in Beijing.

In 1949, Hsu was awarded a scholarship by the British Council for a two-year study in the United Kingdom. He spent the first year at the University of Aberdeen and the second at the University of Cambridge.

In 1951, Hsu returned to China and became an associate professor of mathematics at Tsinghua University. He also taught at Beijing Normal University on a part-time basis. In 1952, Hsu, together with Wang Xianghao and Jiang Zejian (江泽坚), moved to Changchun to help establish the Department of Mathematics at Northeast People's University (later renamed as Jilin University). He served as deputy chair of the department. He was promoted to full professor in 1956, and founded the study of computational mathematics at the university.

In 1980, Hsu moved to the Dalian University of Technology, where he founded the Institute of Applied Mathematics. He also established the Journal of Mathematical Research and Exposition (later renamed as Journal of Mathematical Research with Applications 数学研究及应用) and served as its chief editor. He also served as Chair of the Mathematics Department of the Huazhong University of Science and Technology. From 1986 to 1987, he taught as a visiting professor at the Texas A&M University in the United States. He was named Honorary Dean of the School of Science of the Nanjing University of Aeronautics and Astronautics. In 2009, he was named by the Dalian University of Technology as one of the most important faculty members in the history of the university.

== Contributions ==
Hsu made significant contributions to asymptotic analysis, approximation theory, and combinatorics. He began collaborating with American mathematician Henry W. Gould in 1965, years before US President Richard Nixon established official relations with the People's Republic of China. Their collaboration resulted in the establishment of the Gould–Hsu Matrix Inversion Formula in 1973, which is important for computing combinatorial identities.

Hsu published over 170 research papers and more than 10 monographs. He advised 20 doctoral students. and won multiple national and international prizes.

== Death ==
Hsu died in Beijing on 11 March 2019, at the age of 98.
