= Conar Instruments =

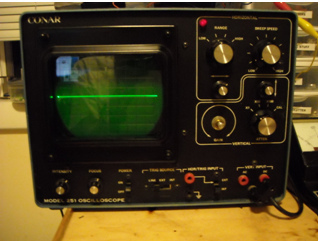
A Conar oscilloscope

The National Radio Institute (NRI) established the Conar Instruments division in the fall of 1961 and announced it in their bimonthly publication, The NRI News. Conar was an expansion of the National Radio Institute's student supply division that functioned primarily to supply test equipment to their students and graduates. It was located in Washington, D.C. at 3939 Wisconsin Ave.

All products that had been originally sold under the name NRI Professional began to carry the CONAR label and were now available to the general public, not just students and alumni. These products were primarily kits, assembled and tested by the students as part of NRI's many home-study training courses. These stock numbers ended in "UK" indicating it was an unassembled kit. Some models, but not all, were also available assembled from the factory with stock numbers ending in "WT" for wired and tested. Conar was able to enter the market with a complete series of radio-TV test-equipment kits of proven design that had already been developed by NRI's technical staff. In addition to the Radio-TV test equipment, Conar would eventually have a complete line of kits for experimenters, hobbyists, ham radio operators, and hi-fi and stereo enthusiasts. Sub-assemblies, cases and parts were also made available.

Trivia: The name 'CONAR' was derived from the first letters of COmpany, NAtional Radio.

== Notable Kits ==
- Model 400/500, aka "The Conar Twins" - an amateur radio transmitter and receiver pair.
- Model 800, TV Camera - an early retail camera for your television.
