= Henry W. Gould =

American mathematician

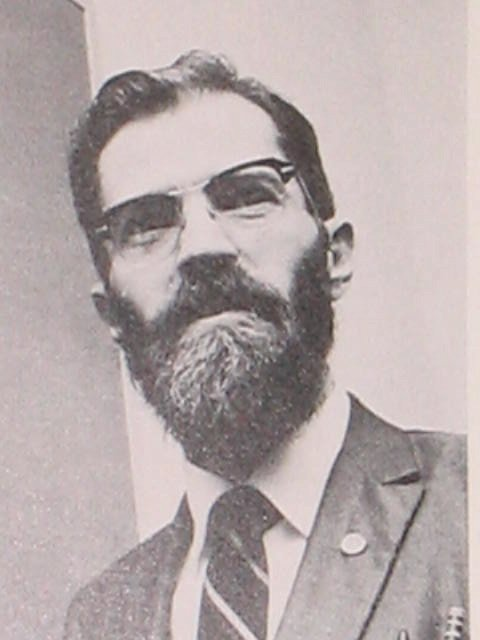
- Henry W. Gould in 1972
- Born: August 26, 1928 (age 98); Portsmouth, Virginia
- Education: University of Virginia (B.A., 1954); University of Virginia (M.A.., 1956)
- Known for: book "Combinatorial Identities": 1972
- Awards: J. Shelton Horsley Research Award; Benedum Distinguished Scholar Award
- Scientific career
- Fields: Mathematics
- Workplaces: West Virginia University

Henry Wadsworth Gould (born August 26, 1928) is a Professor Emeritus of Mathematics at West Virginia University.

== Early life and education ==
Gould was born in Portsmouth, Virginia. Between 1945 and 1947, he attended National Radio Institute in Washington D.C. In 1946, he graduated from Woodrow Wilson High School in Portsmouth, Virginia. In 1946–1948 he studied at Old Dominion University and then at the University of Virginia. He worked at WUVA radio 1948–1957. In 1951 to 1952, he studied communications theory at The Southeastern Signal School (TSESS), Fort Gordon, Georgia. He received a B.A. in mathematics in 1954 and an M.A. Mathematics in 1956, both from the University of Virginia. In 1957, he attended University of North Carolina at Chapel Hill, 1957–1958, where he served as research assistant to Professor Alfred Brauer. In 1958, he moved to Morgantown, West Virginia.

== Academic career ==
In 1958, he joined the faculty of West Virginia University as an instructor, and received the rank of professor in 1969. In spring 2007, he became professor emeritus, after 49 years of service at West Virginia University.

== Research ==
Gould has published over 200 papers, which have appeared in about 20 countries. His research has been in combinatorial analysis, number theory, special functions of mathematical physics, and the history of mathematics and astronomy. Gould served as mathematics consultant to the 'Dear Abby' newspaper column. He wrote an explanation of the three ancient Greek problems (trisecting an angle, squaring the circle, and duplicating the cube); a pamphlet on this material was sent to hundreds of readers (mostly secondary school students) in every state and overseas, who wanted to know more about these famous problems.

In 1957, some of his early work from 1956 was used by Oakley and Wisner to enumerate hexaflexagons.

In 1965, Professors Hsu and Gould began a research collaboration. Gould has also been an associate editor of the on-line electronic Journal of Integer Sequences, and has been a member of the editorial board of the journal Applicable Analysis and Discrete Mathematics published by the University of Belgrade, Serbia.

Between 1976 and 1977, he directed a Research Program at West Virginia University under auspices of the Office of the Provost, concerned with mathematical computations for coal mine valuation, using Bondurant's variation of the Hoskold actuarial formula.

Among his activities in the 2000s, Gould began a research collaboration with Dr. Jocelyn Quaintance, Visiting Research Assistant Professor of Mathematics at West Virginia University in 2006–2010. They worked on a long-term revision of Gould's 1972 book "Combinatorial Identities", and Gould's handwritten manuscript notes covering 1945–1990.

His Star of David theorem (1972) is a mathematical result on arithmetic properties of binomial coefficients.

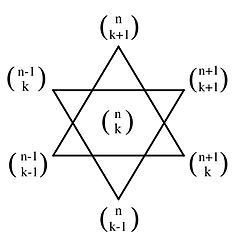
Star-of-david

== Professional activities ==
From 1961 to 1971, Gould founded and circulated a mathematical serial Mathematica Monongaliae, of which 12 issues were published. Several of these have been reprinted extensively, such as issue No. 12, a "Bibliography of Bell and Catalan Numbers". This annotated bibliography was cited in two separate articles by Martin Gardner in his mathematical column in the Scientific American magazine. Issue No. 10, a "Chronological Bibliography of the Cauchy Integral Theorem" listing 200 proofs of the famous theorem was coauthored with Herbert K. Fallin. The bibliography was cited in the journal Historia Mathematica. With the aid of graduate student Timothy Glatzer of West Virginia University, the Bell and Catalan number bibliography has been revised and re-alphabetized and it is available online.

In 1962, Gould was one of the founding editors of the number theory journal Fibonacci Quarterly and for many years has been an associate editor of the Journal of Mathematical Research and Exposition founded by Leetsch C. Hsu and published at Dalian, People's Republic of China.

== Honors ==
In 1957, Gould was elected as a full member of the Sigma Xi Research Society for his distinction in mathematics at the University of Virginia, and the Beta chapter of the national mathematics honorary Pi Mu Epsilon at the University of North Carolina.

In 1963, he was elected a Fellow of the American Association for the Advancement of Science.

In 1967, he became one of the charter members of the Alpha chapter of Pi Mu Epsilon mathematics honorary at West Virginia University.

Between 1967 and 1970, he was a visiting lecturer for the Mathematical Association of America.

He has been a consultant with the National Security Agency, principal investigator at West Virginia University with several College of Arts and Sciences grants, and grants from the National Science Foundation on the topic of Combinatorial Identities, and has served as a reviewer for the Mathematical Reviews and the Zentralblatt für Mathematik.

Between 1974 and 1976, he was a visiting lecturer for the Society for Industrial and Applied Mathematics.

From 1974 to 1979, Gould was editor-in-chief of the Proceedings of the West Virginia Academy of Science .

In 1976, he was an invited participant to the first Annual Symposium on the History of Mathematics held at the National Museum of Science and Technology, Smithsonian Institution, Washington, D.C., concerned with Cauchy's contributions to analysis. Gould has published extensive bibliographies on combinatorial topics and on Cauchy's integral theorem.

In 1977, he received the J. Shelton Horsley Research Award from the Virginia Academy of Science.

In March 1988, Gould received the Benedum Distinguished Scholar Award for Physical Sciences and Technology at West Virginia University.

In 1990, Gould was elected a Foundation Fellow of the Institute of Combinatorics and its Applications.

In 1999, Volume 204 of the journal Discrete Mathematics was dedicated in honor of Gould and his work and contained numerous invited papers in his honor. The volume was edited by Ira M. Gessel and Louis W. Shapiro, assisted by others. It contained an amusing biographical preface by the editors.

In 2006, an article entitled "An Interview with H. W. Gould", by Scott H. Brown, appears in the College Mathematics Journal.

On 20 Sept. 2007, a mathematics colloquium was held in Gould's honor, at which time George Andrews, Evan Pugh Professor in the department of mathematics at The Pennsylvania State University and president-elect of the American Mathematical Society, presented a paper "Gould’s Function and Problems in Partitions," as part of the WVU Distinguished Lecture Series in Mathematics in the Eberly College of Arts and Sciences. Andrews' paper was motivated by Gould's 1964 paper on compositions into relatively prime parts.

On 10 March 2010, Gould was elected an Honorary Fellow of the Institute of Combinatorics and its Applications at the 19th Annual General Meeting of the Institute at Florida Atlantic University.

== Personal life ==
Henry Gould is married to Jean West Gould and together they live in Morgantown, West Virginia. His late first wife Josephine Angotti Gould (1932–1994) owned a pet shop and was active with art and published articles about birds and tropical fish. They raised orchids and founded and ran a local orchid society for 15 years.

== Bibliography ==
- Gould, H.W. (1954). "Note on a paper of Grosswald". Amer. Math. Monthly. 61 (4): 251–253. doi:10.2307/2306394. JSTOR 2306394.
- Some generalizations of Vandermonde's convolution, Amer. Math. Monthly, 63(1956), 84–91.
- Final analysis of Vandermonde's convolution, Amer. Math. Monthly, 64(1957), 409–415.
- Stirling number representation problems, Proc. Amer. Math. Soc., 11(1960), 447–451.
- The Lagrange interpolation formula and Stirling numbers, Proc. Amer. Math. Soc., 11(1960), 421–425.
- A new convolution formula and some new orthogonal relations for inversion of series, Duke Math. J., 29(1962), 393–404.
- Binomial coefficients, the bracket function, and compositions with relatively prime summands, Fibonacci Quart., 2(1964), 241–260.
- Combinatorial Identities, A Standardized Set of Tables Listing 500 Binomial Coefficient Summations. Revised Edition 1972, Published by the author. Printed by Morgantown Printing and Binding Co., Morgantown, W. Va. (3) + viii + 106 pp. LC Cat.Card No. 73-179239.
- A new primality criterion of Mann and Shanks and its relation to a theorem of Hermite, Fibonacci Quart., 10(1972), 355–364; 372. Errata, ibid. 10(1972), 656.
- Coefficient identities for powers of Taylor and Dirichlet series, Amer. Math. Monthly, 81(1974), 3–14.
- (with L. C. Hsu) Some new inverse series relations, Duke Math. J., 40(1973), 885–891.
- Annihilation coefficients, in the book "Analysis, Combinatorics and Computing", (Tian-Xiao He, Peter J. S. Shiue, and Zhongkai Li (eds.)), Nova Science Publishers, Inc., 2002, 205–223. (refereed paper for 80-th Birthday Conference in Honor of L. C. Hsu, Dalian, China, August 2000) ISBN 1-59033-405-1
- (with Temba Shonhiwa) A Catalogue of Dirichlet Series, Missouri Journal of Science and Mathematics, Vol. 20(2008), No. 1, Winter issue, second paper, 17 pages.
- (with Jocelyn Quaintance) A linear binomial recurrence and the Bell numbers and polynomials, Applicable Mathematics and Discrete Mathematics, Vol.1(2007), No. 2, 371–385
- Proof and generalization of an Identity of E. T. Bell, Bulletin of the Allahabad Math. Society, 24(2009), Part 1, pp. 71–82.
- (with Jocelyn Quaintance) Generalizations of Vosmansky's identity, Fibonacci Quarterly, Vol.48(2010), No. 1, Feb. pp. 56–61.
- (with Jocelyn Quaintance) A one parameter generalization of Bell's sum, Indian J. Math., Allahabad. Vol. 53(2011), No. 2, pp. 301–329.
- Gould, Henry; Quaintance, Jocelyn (2012). "Double fun with double factorials". Mathematics Magazine. 85 (3): 177–192. doi:10.4169/math.mag.85.3.177.
- Brawley, Joel V.; Brillhart, John; Gould, Henry W. (2012). "Recollections of Leonard Carlitz (including: the publications of Leonard Calitz)". Acta Arithmetica. 152 (4): 361–405. doi:10.4064/aa152-4-3. Annotated Catalogue of Carlitz's 773 publications.
- "Combinatorial Identities for Stirling Numbers, The Unpublished Notes of H. W. Gould", by Jocelyn Quaintance and H. W. Gould, listed by World Scientific Publishing Co., Singapore, International Standard Book Number ISBN 978-981-4725-26-2 (hardcover)

== See also ==
- Gould's sequence
- Dirichlet series
- Star of David theorem
- Leonard Carlitz
- William Stone Weedon
