= Hsu–Robbins–Erdős theorem =

Statement in probability theory

In the mathematical theory of probability, the Hsu–Robbins–Erdős theorem states that if $X_1, \ldots ,X_n$ is a sequence of i.i.d. random variables with zero mean and finite variance and

$$S_n = X_1 +  \cdots  + X_n, \,$$

then

$$\sum\limits_{n \geqslant 1} P( | S_n | > \varepsilon n) < \infty$$

for every $\varepsilon > 0$.

The result was proved by Pao-Lu Hsu and Herbert Robbins in 1947.

This is an interesting strengthening of the classical strong law of large numbers in the direction of the Borel–Cantelli lemma. The idea of such a result is probably due to Robbins, but the method of proof is vintage Hsu. Hsu and Robbins further conjectured in that the condition of finiteness of the variance of $X$ is also a necessary condition for $\sum\limits_{n \geqslant 1} P(| S_n | > \varepsilon n) < \infty$ to hold. Two years later, the famed mathematician Paul Erdős proved the conjecture.

Since then, many authors extended this result in several directions.
