= Ceramide phosphoethanolamine synthase =

In enzymology, a ceramide phosphoethanolamine synthase (EC 2.7.8.-) is an enzyme that catalyzes the chemical reaction

a ceramide + a phosphoethanolamine head group donor $\rightleftharpoons$ a ceramide-phosphoethanolamine + side product

Ceramide phosphoethanolamine (CPE) is a sphingolipid consisted of a ceramide and a phosphoethanolamine head group. Thus, this class of enzymes uses ceramide and a donor molecule for phosphoethanolamine as substrates to produce a ceramide phosphoethanolamine and a side product. The head group donor for phosphoethanolamine can be either phosphatidylethanolamine or CDP-ethanolamine, thus the side product is either a 1,2-diacylglycerol or a CMP, respectively.

This enzyme belongs to the family of transferases, specifically those transferring non-standard substituted phosphate groups.

== Mammalian Ceramide Phosphoethanolamine Synthases ==
In mammalian cells, two CPE synthase activities have been described, one resides in the endoplasmic reticulum, and the other one is associated with the plasma membrane. The endoplasmic reticulum-resident CPE synthase, SMSr, is identified as a monofunctional CPE synthase produces trace amounts of CPE. On the other hand, mammalian CPE synthase that is on the plasma membrane, SMS2, is a bifunctional enzyme that produces both CPE and sphingomyelin, thus also functioning as a sphingomyelin synthase. Both mammalian CPE synthases, SMS2 and SMSr, use phosphatidylethanolamine (PE) as head group donor and catalyzes the reaction

a ceramide + a phosphatidylethanolamine $\rightleftharpoons$ a ceramide-phosphoethanolamine + 1,2-diacylglycerol

== Invertebrate Ceramide Phosphoethanolamine Synthases ==
SMSr protein is found in all organisms throughout the animal kingdom as a CPE synthase, yet it produces trace amounts of CPE. Drosophila and a group of invertebrates lack SMS2 homologues. This group of invertebrates synthesizes CPE using a particular enzyme called CPES. CPES uses CDP-ethanolamine rather than phosphatidylethanolamine as head group donor, thus catalyzes the reaction

a ceramide + a CDP-ethanolamine $\rightleftharpoons$ a ceramide-phosphoethanolamine + CMP

CPES uses a different reaction mechanism than the one sphingomyelin synthase uses, but very similar to that of enzymes involved in synthesis of phosphatidyl ethanolamine (EC 2.7.8.1) via the Kennedy pathway.
