= National Radio Institute =

Private college in the United States

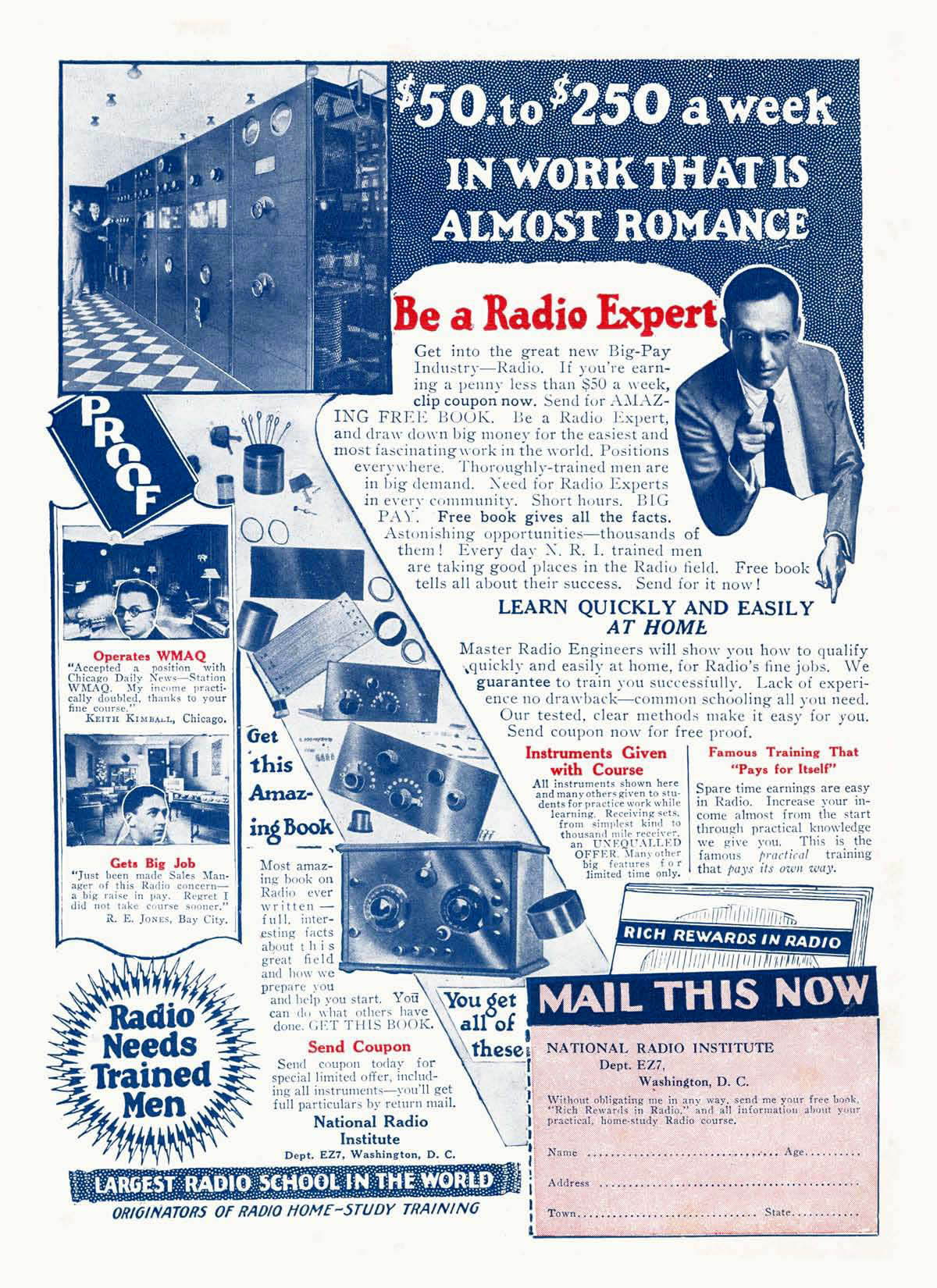
1926 magazine advertisement for the National Radio Institute

The National Radio Institute-McGraw Hill Continuing Education Center was a private, postsecondary, for-profit correspondence school based in Washington, D.C., from 1914 to 2002. The school originally trained students to become radio operators and technicians. (In 1922, the term "radiotrician" was coined for NRI graduates and registered with the U.S. patent office in 1928). NRI conducted training courses via mailed lessons, a form of asynchronous learning. NRI's initial home-study course offerings were in radio (transmitter and receiver) repair, as well as radio telegraphy & telephony. These courses were designed to be comprehensive, covering all facets of radio technology, including radio operation, broadcasting, manufacturing, sales, and service. An F.C.C. license exam preparation course was implemented and, in time, more courses were added for students to become tradesmen in the broader field of electronic equipment servicing, including TV/VCR repair, basic electronics, automation & control systems, avionic & marine communication systems, and even a very early computer technology (logic and programming) course in 1971. (On a side note, NRI registered the term "teletrician" with the U.S. patent office in 1938). Eventually, NRI implemented courses in electric appliance repair, automotive mechanics, small engine repair, building construction, home inspection, air conditioning, refrigeration, heating & solar technology, computer repair, locksmithing, as well as bookkeeping and accounting. Nevertheless, radio-television electronics remained the company's most prominent division. NRI was America's oldest and largest home-study radio-television-electronics school, a claim that the school frequently advertised. The school was also an accredited member of the National Home Study Council, now known as the Distance Education Accrediting Commission.

== Early history (1914–68) ==
=== National Radio School: primarily classroom instruction ===
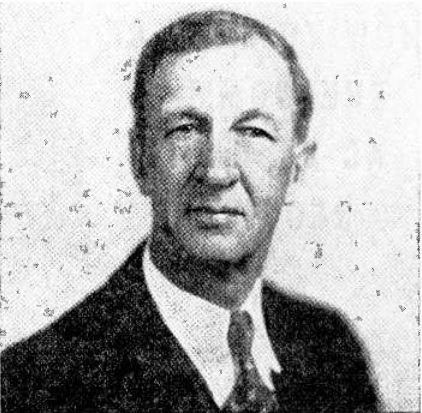
James Ernest Smith, founder of the National Radio Institute

The National Radio School was established in 1914 in Washington, D.C., by James Ernest Smith (1881–1973) and Emanuel R. Haas (1891–1947).^{1} Smith was a teacher at McKinley Manual Training School (which was moved in 1926 to its final location now known as McKinley Technology High School). He held a bachelor's degree in electrical engineering (BSEE, 1906) from Worcester Polytechnic Institute and began his career at Westinghouse Electric Corporation in Pittsburgh, but took an extended leave of absence to teach the remainder of an applied electricity course on behalf of an ailing colleague at McKinley. Smith later accepted a permanent position at the school. Eventually, students began consulting him for private formal instruction—which is precisely how the National Radio School began. With enthusiastic support from Mr. Haas, who was then Assistant Publicity Director for Keith's Theater in Washington, D.C., a small classroom was set up for four students inside the U.S. Savings Bank Building at 14th and U Street NW, now the site of the Frank D. Reeves Municipal Center. Haas became the school's vice president and business director, and the school grew in popularity.

In 1915, John Albert Dowie (1886–1958) was hired as the National Radio School's Radio Theory Instructor (later becoming Chief Instructor) and stayed with the school for 36 years. The first home study courses were developed and implemented by the National Radio School as early as 1916, enabling students to continue their training without being physically present at the school. During World War I, facilities were expanded to address the burgeoning demand for radio operators. By 1917, enrollment had swelled to 150 students.

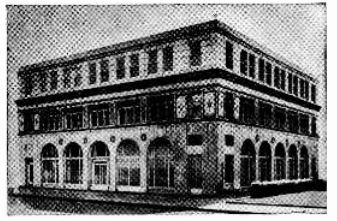
NRI's main office building at 16th and U Street NW in Washington D.C., home of the school from 1927 to 1957.

=== National Radio Institute: exclusively home study courses ===
In 1918, the U.S. government appointed Smith director of the Radio Department at Howard University, where he was responsible for Signal Corps training, while Haas was asked to conduct radio work for the Army Officer's School at Yale University and Camp Alfred Vail, Little Silver, New Jersey. Edward L. Degener (1898–1974) joined to oversee advertising and organization in Haas' temporary absence, but stayed on to eventually become General Manager and Treasurer, retiring in 1960. After World War I, demand for radio operators continued to grow and, in 1920, classes were moved to Pennsylvania Avenue when the school was renamed the National Radio Institute. In 1923, the business was relocated to Connecticut Avenue NW in Washington, D.C., and classroom instruction was discontinued entirely so the school could focus solely on its home-study model. The business quickly outgrew this location as well, and moved to 16th And U Street NW in 1927, where it occupied the entire building for the next 30 years. The building on U Street was constructed in 1915 and still stands today, currently occupied by the Center for Community Change.

=== Publications, technical advisory board, and alumni association ===
In addition to more than 250 textbooks, NRI began, in 1928, to publish for its students and alumni a trade magazine originally called National Radio News, which was renamed multiple times to: National Radio - TV News(1950), NRI News(1958), and finally to NRI Journal(1963). An alumni association was formed on November 23, 1929, when NRI's average annual enrollment was about 18,000 students. Established that same year was NRI's technical advisory board, which eventually included among its members, Lee de Forest, the American inventor of the Audion triode vacuum tube, and prominent radio engineer Cyril M. Jansky Jr., and Maj. Gen. George Owen Squier. American electrical engineer Alfred Norton Goldsmith joined the board in 1934, followed in 1935 by inventor and television pioneer Philo Farnsworth (a 1924 alumnus of NRI), as well as Harry Diamond (engineer) in 1938. By 1932, Joseph Kaufman, an electrical engineering instructor and MIT graduate, was hired as Supervisor of Education (later, Director of Education). In 1942, NRI contracted him for one dollar per year to the National Bureau of Standards, where he worked with Harry Diamond to develop the radio proximity fuse.

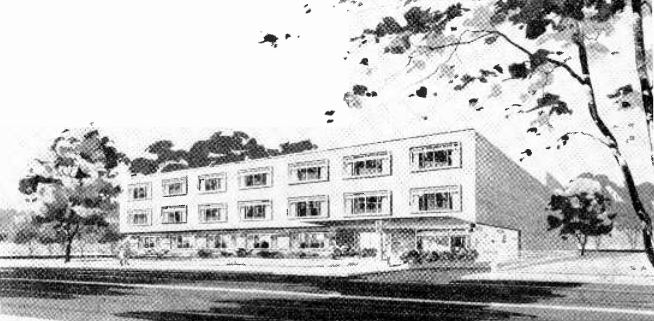
A sketch of the NRI building on Wisconsin Ave NW in Washington D.C., which appeared in the Jun-Jul 1957 issue of the National Radio-TV News Journal announcing the school's relocation.

=== Retirement of the founder and final move ===
In 1947, Haas died unexpectedly and his responsibilities were passed on to James E. Smith's son, James Morrison Smith (1916–2010)^{2}, another graduate of Worcester Polytechnic Institute (BSIE, 1937) and former engineer at U. S. Steel and DuPont. J.M. Smith had been an executive at the school since 1945. In December 1956, James E. Smith turned 75 years of age and stepped down from the presidency, handing the role over to his son, while remaining active in the school as founder and chairman of the board. The following year, planning commenced for a 59,000 square foot building designed specifically for NRI at 3939 Wisconsin Avenue NW in Washington, D.C. The school moved into the building in May 1957 and remained there until closing more than four decades later. In 1960, Edward L. Degener retired from NRI after 41 years of service. He was succeeded by Harold E. Luber (1906–1998), who was appointed vice president. Luber had been with the company since 1929 and ran NRI's Student Services department. An attorney, he also served as in-house counsel.

=== Advertisement ===
The National Radio School and Institute ran advertisements for its courses for decades in magazines such as Boys' Life, Popular Science, Popular Mechanics, Radio-Electronics, and Electronics Illustrated. These ads often contained appealing testimonials from NRI graduates, but sometimes by popular and/or successful spokespersons who were not NRI alumni. For example, Tom McCahill endorsed NRI 's appliance repair course in a 1975 ad in Popular Mechanics. According to one source, direct marketing ads largely stopped by the mid-1970s.^{3}

== Conar Instruments (1962) ==
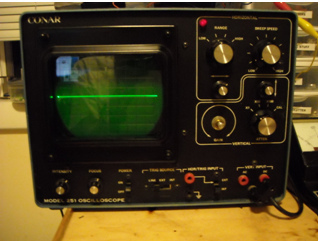
A Conar oscilloscope

NRI's home study courses included kits from which students would assemble circuits or entire radio/stereo receivers, television receivers, as well as test instruments of various kinds (analog multimeters, tube testers, oscilloscopes, signal generators, etc.). The objective was to provide practical hands-on experience to supplement the theoretical knowledge obtained from the course reading materials, and to provide affordable service tools for students to practice their new trade. In 1962, NRI began to sell the kits, which were similar to products marketed by Heathkit directly to consumers under the brand name Conar Instruments. In the mid-1960s, Conar very briefly dabbled in the Ham radio business by offering what today are known as the Conar Twins, a transmitter and receiver pair. Many of these vacuum tube-powered transmitters and receivers can still be found at Hamfests and nostalgia events.

== Acquisition and operation, as NRI Schools, by McGraw-Hill Education (1968–99) ==
By the second half of the 1960s, NRI recognized that its limited resources would preclude company from maintaining a dominant market position in the coming decade, spurring James Morrison Smith to seek a partner/buyer. In 1968, McGraw-Hill Education agreed to purchase NRI after acquiring a 20 percent stake in the correspondence division of Capitol Radio Engineering Institute in 1964. By this time, over one million students had completed an NRI course. McGraw-Hill anticipated a new market for technical books, while NRI hoped the acquisition would enable them to utilize the vast technical publishing resources of its new owner. The McGraw-Hill name began appearing in the NRI Journal in 1970. In 1973, the McGraw-Hill name first appeared in catalogues of copyright entries for NRI courses in the U.S. Library of Congress, and in 1974, first appeared in magazine advertisements. After the acquisition, the school was renamed once again as NRI Schools, and became an integral part of the newly established McGraw-Hill Continuing Education Center.

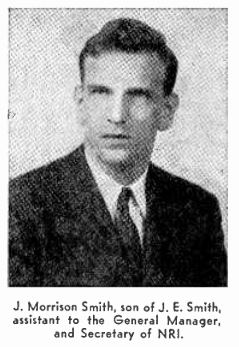
James Morrison Smith (circa 1954), son of and successor to James E. Smith

Founder James E. Smith remained NRI Schools chairman until his death in 1973 while his son, James Morrison Smith, continued to serve as president, a post he held since 1956. After James E. Smith's death in September 1973 and his son's semi-retirement^{2} at the end of that same year (fully retiring in 1976), John F. ("Jack") Thompson (1931–2015), who joined NRI in 1955, became president and CEO of NRI Schools and a senior vice-president of the McGraw-Hill Continuing Education Center until his retirement in 1984.^{4} Thompson was succeeded by Edward B. "Ted" Beach (1934–1999), who was appointed director of the education department at McGraw Hill's Continuing Education Center. Beach retired in 1989 after 28 years of service with NRI. The last director/general manager of the school was Nick Maruhnich (born 1951), who served as senior vice president of special projects at the McGraw-Hill Companies and general manager of the McGraw-Hill Continuing Education Center - NRI Schools.

By the mid-1980s, NRI's average annual student enrollment had peaked to approximately 60,000 students, a substantial increase over the 38,000 a few years earlier. NRI Schools claimed to be the first organization to educate students on a digital computer with training software and to use multimedia computers and the internet to familiarize students with cutting-edge technology. Under McGraw-Hill's management, the school branched out into many other training fields, including computer repair. However, by the 1990s, economic and technological forces adversely affected the business.

== NRI's closing (1999–2002) ==
The school's closing was primarily a case of labor economics. Throughout its existence, NRI was a reputable business and vocational school. Its closing was not so much due to the rise-and-fall of for-profit schools, but more related to rapid technological developments and changes in consumer attitudes in the late twentieth century, as well as the school's insufficient course diversification efforts in its later years. Radio-television-electronics servicing (the school's primary focus) reached a point where it was no longer a lucrative career path, as consumers had come to see electronic goods as disposable items. Consequently, McGraw-Hill concluded that NRI's future business prospects and growth opportunities were too limited despite improving profits and operations (such as the implementation of updated computer repair courses). The decline of the business was quite gradual at first (e.g., the publication of NRI Journal was discontinued in 1980). By the next decade, the digital revolution, VLSI, and miniaturization were rapidly developing, which helped set the stage for the school's eventual closing.

=== Market Force Determining Factors ===
==== Price erosion and the end of American dominance in TV/radio manufacturing ====
During the last two decades of the twentieth century, increasing offshoring activities of American companies with the rise of globalization resulted in lower production costs. But the fierce global competition in the electronics industry caused a gradual price erosion of American products. Market share and revenues of American television and radio manufacturers began to fall in the wake of the cost-effective strategies of foreign competitors. By the 1980s, imported radio and television receivers (particularly those from Japan) dominated the American market, as foreign electronics tended to be of higher quality at lower prices (making the items more likely to be replaced rather than repaired after breakage or malfunction). Consequently, several American electronics manufacturers ceased domestic production or closed down entirely, namely Quasar (brand)/Motorola (1974), Magnavox (1974), Admiral (electrical appliances) (1979), GTE (1981), (which owned Sylvania Electric Products and Philco), General Electric (1985), RCA (1986), and Curtis Mathes Corporation (1988). The last U.S. manufacturer to produce television receivers domestically was Zenith Electronics, which sold a controlling interest of its shares to the Korean company LG Electronics in 1995, becoming a wholly owned subsidiary of LG in 1999.

==== Effect of advanced technologies on the electronics service sector in general ====
Technological advances accounted for much of the eventual demise of TV/radio service jobs. At least three contributory factors can be singled out:

1) Weak cost justification for repairs: It was becoming hard for consumers to justify the repair of malfunctioning electronic items when the purchasing of newer models was so affordable due to advances in semiconductor and electronic materials technology. With the exception of display technologies, the newer television and radio receivers generally had fewer internal components that were smaller in size, and thus cheaper to produce. Weak cost justification for repairs often remains the case with consumer electronics.

2) Relative ease of repairs: By the early 1980s, most TV and radio manufacturers were producing solid-state sets with a modular chassis design, which meant that technicians needed less formal training to make repairs because component-level troubleshooting was not as often required—as was the case of older tube sets, in which repairs frequently involved the simple replacement of a vacuum tube. By the end of the decade, some solid-state TV manufacturers were producing sets in which the receivers' entire electronic circuit was contained on a single, replaceable printed circuit board. (Ironically, the opposite is true today, as flat screen television receivers are actually more difficult to repair than the old CRT TV's, and replacement parts are harder to obtain from the manufacturer, due to longer lead times).

3) Equipment obsolescence: By the end of the 1990s, the demise of discrete analogue electronics ensured the technological obsolescence of many traditional mainstays of the consumer audio/video service industry, such as cathode ray tube (CRT) television sets, videocassette recorders, LaserDisc players, tape recorders/players, console stereos and component stereo systems. Such products were replaced by cheaper, more portable digital devices with advanced features, such as digital signal processing and computer technology. Unfortunately, the new products were difficult-to-service, not economically feasible to repair, or designed with planned obsolescence. With today's accelerating rate of technological advancement, electronic equipment becomes obsolete in ever shorter periods of time.

The progression of America towards a throw-away society drastically reduced employment prospects in the electronics service sector. According to the Professional Service Association, the number of TV repair shops fell from 20,000 in 1992; 9,000 in 2002 then to around 7,000 by 2007. From 2011 to 2016, the average annual growth rate of electronics and computer repair services industry was -1.0%. The concomitant effect for NRI Schools was a sharp decline in enrollment. However, several NRI competitors in the home-study business (see below) survived these turbulent times by offering a wider variety of subjects, including nontechnical training courses relevant to the current demand.

=== The school's closure and legacy ===
Ultimately, after radio-television-electronics servicing lost its appeal as a trade, McGraw-Hill announced that NRI would be phased out, citing "changes in the marketplace". The school stopped accepting new enrollment applications on April 1, 1999, and discontinued operations on March 31, 2002, after a respectable 88 years in the distance education business.

Over its lifetime, NRI administered 1.5 million correspondence courses and adapted its coursework to major technical transformations in the radio-television-electronics industry from vacuum tubes to solid-state devices (first to discrete transistors and then to integrated circuits), from CRTs to flat panel displays. NRI saw the rise of cable television, the decline of terrestrial television, and the transition from electromechanical tuners to microprocessor-controlled receivers, as well as the introduction of personal computers. NRI closed seven years prior to the Digital television transition in the United States. After the school shut down, the Wisconsin Avenue property was purchased and occupied by 'Fannie Mae' (Federal National Mortgage Association), whose headquarters were directly across the street.

== Notable alumni ==
- Philo Farnsworth, American inventor and television pioneer (completed NRI radio servicing course during his first year of college at Brigham Young University)
- Ralph H. Baer, German-American inventor and engineer, often called the "father of video games" (a 1940 alumnus of the NRI radio service course)
- John Fetzer, a radio and television executive (served as the first president of the NRI alumni association)
- Polk Perdue, son of Hub Perdue a professional baseball player and manager
- Richard Hoyt Moore (1897–1987), an Indiana State Senator
- Charles H. Caldwell (1915–1989), a prominent Kentucky businessman, urban development and civic leader
- Henry W. Gould (b. 1928), Professor Emeritus of Mathematics at West Virginia University
- Hugh Robert Carlon, American chemical engineer, author and inventor; worked for the U. S. Army Chemical Research and Development Laboratories at the Edgewood Arsenal within the Aberdeen Proving Ground in Maryland.

== Similar American schools contemporary with NRI ==
Throughout the 20th century, several technical American schools existed, offering correspondence courses similar to those of NRI, including:

- International Correspondence Schools (ICS), now Penn Foster Career School (founded 1890, in Scranton, PA) (still open)
- Massey Technical Institute (founded 1894 in Jacksonville, FL) (defunct in the mid-1970s)
- Coyne Electrical School, now Coyne College (founded 1899) (defunct 2022)
- National Technical Schools (founded 1905 in Los Angeles, CA) (now defunct)
- Capitol Radio Engineering Institute (founded 1927 in Washington, D.C.) (still open)
- DeVry Technical Institute (founded 1931 in Chicago IL as Deforest's Training Inc.) (still open)
- Cleveland Institute of Electronics (founded 1934 in Cleveland, OH, as Smith Practical Radio Institute) (defunct 2022)
- Sprayberry Academy of Radio (founded 1943, in Washington D.C. but also operated out of Pueblo, CO, and Chicago, IL) (now defunct)
- American Basic Science Club (founded 1957 in San Antonio, TX) (now defunct)

Some of these trade schools have survived by diversifying their academic offerings. For example, including residential (face-to-face) courses as well as virtual classes in business administration, medical technology, medical billing & coding, among other programs, with some schools offering associate's, bachelor's, and graduate-level degrees.

== Notes ==
^{1} Smith's birth year is erroneously reported as 1889 in some sources. However, in the article "The Story of the National Radio Institute," which appeared in a 1944 National Radio News journal, Smith's birth date and place is given as February 3, 1881 in Rochester, New Hampshire.

^{2} A WPI benefactor publication from September, 2010, lists both J. Morrison Smith (from the class of 1937) and his father (class of 1906) as deceased. J. Morrison Smith died in February 2010 in South Carolina at the age of 93 after having initially retired to North Carolina.

^{3} However, by the late 1970s through the 1980s, and as late as 1996 advertisements appeared in Popular Mechanics for NRI courses in audio/video servicing, computer repair, home inspecting, automotive servicing, master locksmithing, small engine repair, air conditioning/heating/refrigeration, and electrical installation/repair.

^{4} Thompson's obituary claims Thompson served as NRI Schools president and CEO from 1973 until he resigned in 1984 to start his own consulting firm. A January 1974 NRI Journal article confirms Thompson succeeded J. Morrison Smith as president in 1973.

== Sources ==
- americanradiohistory.com
- https://books.google.com/books?id=HNgDAAAAMBAJ&dq=NRI+NATIONAL+RADIO+INSTITUTE+appliance+repair&pg=PA27
- americanradiohistory.com
- "National Radio News". onlinebooks.library.upenn.edu.
- http://tenwatts.blogspot.com/2009/01/be-radio-technician.html
- http://www.itsallaboutfamily.com/j3/index.php?option=com_content&view=category&id=456&Itemid=207&lang=en
- americanradiohistory.com
- http://www.qsl.net/k4tfj/Conar/conar.html
- https://books.google.com/books?id=EE5WoNJ1g-IC&dq=national+radio+institute+mcgraw+hill+cont+ed+ctr&pg=PT196
- https://books.google.com/books?id=Q2YEAAAAMBAJ&dq=NRI+popular+mechanics+1996+locksmith&pg=PA18
- http://www.legacy.com/obituaries/capitalgazette/obituary.aspx?n=john-thompson&pid=174337672
- http://usatoday30.usatoday.com/tech/news/2004-01-14-electronic-repairs_x.htm
- https://files.eric.ed.gov/fulltext/ED047248.pdf
