= James Ernest Smith =

American engineer, entrepreneur, educator and businessman

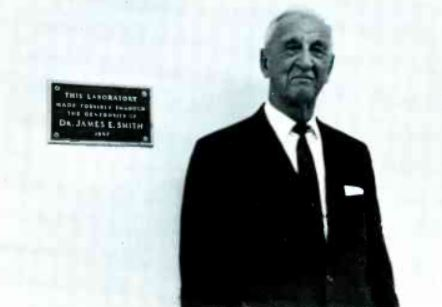
James Ernest Smith in 1968 at the Florida Institute of Technology

James Ernest Smith (1881–1973) was an American engineer, entrepreneur, educator, and businessman. He was the co-founder and president of the National Radio Institute (NRI) in Washington D.C., which trained 1.5 million students through home study over its 88-year history. Smith was born on February 3, 1881, in Rochester, New Hampshire. He held a bachelor's degree in electrical engineering (B.S.E.E., 1906) from Worcester Polytechnic Institute (WPI) and began his career at Westinghouse Electric Corporation in Pittsburgh, but he took an extended leave of absence in 1907 to teach what remained in the term of an applied electricity course at McKinley Manual Training School (moved in 1926 to its present location in Washington, D.C., and now known as McKinley Technology High School) for a colleague who had become ill. It went well and Smith was offered a permanent position at the school, which he accepted.

After a while, students began coming to Smith for private formal instruction. The National Radio School (NRI's name during the first few years of existence) began with a small classroom set up for four students inside the U. S. Savings Bank Building at 14th and U Street N.W. in Washington. Additional students quickly began to seek enrollment. Smith taught at McKinley until 1918, at which point he began to devote his time fully to the National Radio School. In 1926, he helped organize the National Home Study Council. James E. Smith held honorary doctorates from WPI, Southeastern University, and Brevard Engineering College (now the Florida Institute of Technology).

Smith and his family prospered from the continued success and expansion of NRI, eventually becoming quite wealthy. The family lived in a large luxurious home (built in 1938, and still a private residence) in McLean, Virginia, located in a wooded area on the banks of the Potomac River off the George Washington Memorial Parkway (on Crest Lane). James E. Smith's wife was Sarah Morrison Smith, who was a graduate of the Washington School of Law, and was admitted to practice before the District Bar. They traveled extensively, both domestically and internationally. The couple was married for 54 years before she died in January 1965 at the age of 83. The Smiths had two daughters, Marjory (1912–2004, married surname was Sarich) and Carol (1914–2007, married name was Galbraith), and one son, James Morrison (1916–2010, he went by his middle name). In 1956, at age 75, Smith retired as president of NRI and handed the role over to his son Morrison, who was also a graduate of WPI (B.S.I.E., 1937). James E. Smith died on September 30, 1973, at his home in Virginia at the age of 92.

Smith was a strong believer in giving back. He was in leadership roles at Washington area nonprofits like the YMCA and Roundtable, as well as the George Everett Partridge Memorial Foundation for handicapped children (since forfeited). Through the years, James E. Smith, his son Morrison, and his grandson Michael M. Galbraith (B.S., 1958, WPI), were generous benefactors to a variety of causes, including their alma mater, where three four-year full-tuition endowed scholarships were established through the Macamor Foundation, which Smith established in the mid-1950s to continue all of his philanthropic interests after his death. In their lifetimes, they donated, in totality, over one million dollars to WPI. The foundation's name was derived from the first syllables of Smith's three children's names. As of 2015, Smith's descendants were serving as the officers of the Macamor Foundation, now based in South Carolina. In 1955, Smith also established the National Radio Institute Charitable Trust, which contributed regularly to charitable, religious, and educational purposes while it was in existence. An additional career education plan was set up for NRI employees, which paid full tuition costs for further education in fields related to their work.
