= Jiang Zehan =

Chinese mathematician

- 江泽涵
- Born: October 6, 1902; Jingde County, Anhui, China
- Died: March 29, 1994 (aged 91); Beijing, China
- Education: Nankai University; Harvard University
- Scientific career
- Fields: Mathematics
- Workplaces: Peking University
- Doctoral advisor: H. M. Morse
- Notable students: Chen Xingshen; Wang Xianghao; Jiang Boju; Liao Shantao; Liu Yingming

Jiang Zehan (simplified Chinese: 江泽涵; traditional Chinese: 江澤涵; pinyin: Jiāng Zéhán; Wade–Giles: Chiang Tse-han; 6 October 1902 – 29 March 1994), also known as Kiang Tsai-han, was a prominent Chinese mathematician and founder of topology in China. Jiang served as the chairman of the Department of Mathematics at Peking University from 1934 to 1952.

Jiang was a member of the 3rd, 4th, 5th, 6th National Committee of the Chinese People's Political Consultative Conference.

== Biography ==
Jiang was born in Jingde County, Anhui on October 6, 1902, to Jiang Shicai (Chinese: 江世才), a businessman. He secondary studied at Nankai School. In 1922 he was accepted to Nankai University, where he studied mathematics under Jiang Lifu. After graduation, he became an assistant in mathematics at Xiamen University. In 1927 he matriculated at Harvard University on a Chinese government scholarship, and studied mathematics under H. M. Morse. In 1930 he became an assistant of Solomon Lefschetz at Princeton University.

Jiang returned to China in 1931 and that year became professor of mathematics at Peking University. In 1936, he went to the United States for the second time, and studied for one year at the Institute of Advanced Studies, Princeton University. In 1937 he returned to China and taught at National Southwestern Associated University. In 1947 he pursued advanced studies in Switzerland, studying mathematics under H. Hopf. Jiang returned to China on August 8, 1949. After the establishment of the Communist State, he taught at Peking University.

He was elected as an academician of the Chinese Academy of Sciences in 1955. In 1981 he joined the Chinese Communist Party.

On March 29, 1994, he died in Beijing, aged 91.

== Papers ==
- T. H. Kiang (1932). "On the critical points of nondegenerate Newtonian potani-tials". Amer. J. Math. 54 (1): 94–109. doi:10.2307/2371080. JSTOR 2371080.
- T. H. Kiang (1932). "On the existence of critical points of Green's functions forthree－dimensional regions". Amer. J. Math. 54 (4): 657–666. doi:10.2307/2371093. JSTOR 2371093.
- T. H. Kiang (1934). "CritiCal points of harmonic functions and Green's functionsin plane regions". Science Quarterly Peking Univ. 3: 113–123.
- T. H. Kiang (1936). "On the Poincarés groups and the eXtended universal coverings of clased orientable two-manifolds". J. Chinese Math. Soc. 1: 93–153.
- T. H. Kiang (1943). "Ramarks on two-leaved orientable covering manifolds of closed manifolds". Annals of Mathematics. 44 (1): 128–130. doi:10.2307/1969070. JSTOR 1969070.
- T. H. Kiang (1943). "An application of the addition formulas of Mayervietoris". Science Record. 1: 275–276.
- T. H. Kiang (1945). "The manifolds of linear elements of an 𝑛-sphere". Bulletin of the American Mathematical Society. 51 (6): 418–428. doi:10.1090/s0002-9904-1945-08369-4.
- T. H. Kiang; Jiang Bo-ju (1963). "The Nielsen numbers of self-mappings of the same homotopy type". Scientia Sinica. 12: 1071–1072.
