= Supervisor Monitoring Scheduler =

The Supervisor Monitoring Scheduler (or SMS) is a job scheduler infrastructure for Linux-based systems, formerly licensed and maintained by the European Centre for Medium-Range Weather Forecasts (ECMWF). It is used to submit batch jobs to different hosts through, for example, ssh. Server-host interaction is assured through RPC calls.

SMS has been used by ECMWF member states for operational work (controlling job queues for numerical weather forecast runs). It uses a CLI prompt (CDP) to define job hierarchies from definition files, and when a job suite is defined, it can be controlled and monitored through an X-motif GUI interface called Xcdp.

SMS is no longer available for download, having been replaced by ecFlow
