= Pao-Lu Hsu =

Chinese mathematician

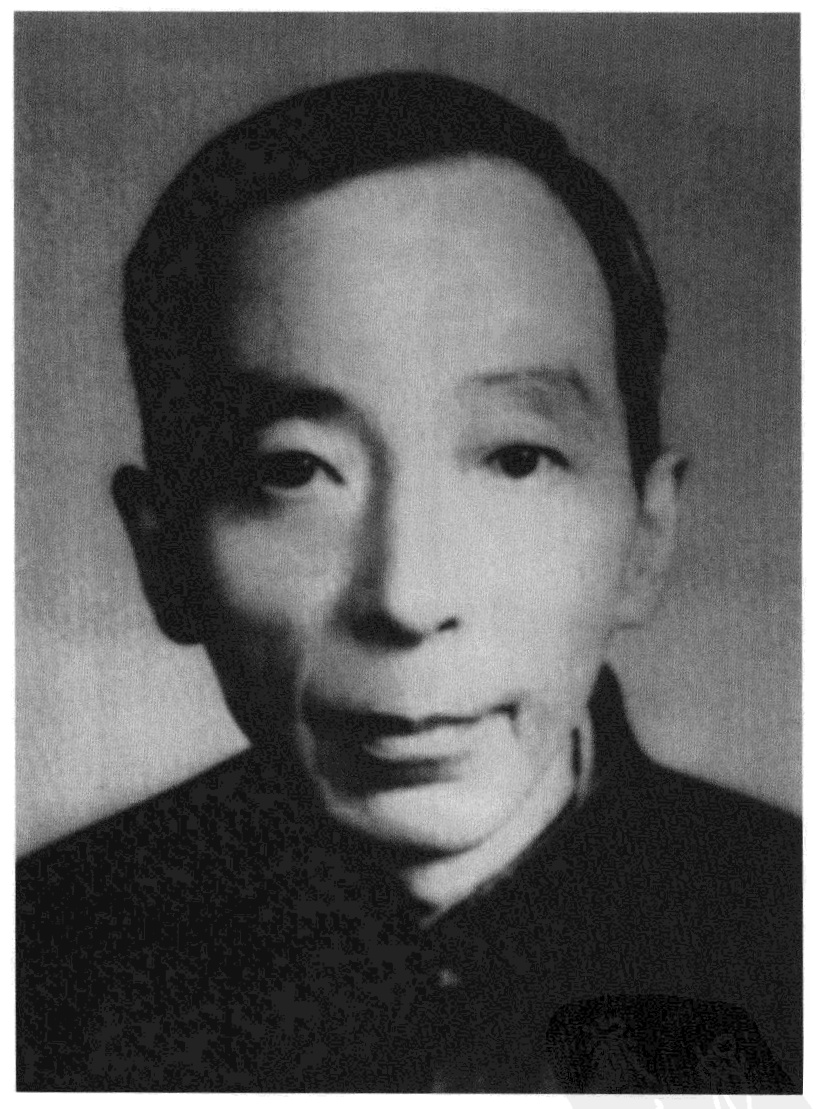
- Born: September 1, 1910; Beijing, China
- Died: December 18, 1970 (aged 60); Beijing, China
- Education: University College London (PhD, DSc)
- Scientific career
- Fields: Mathematics
- Workplaces: School of Mathematical Sciences; Peking University
- Doctoral advisors: Egon Pearson; Jerzy Neyman

Pao-Lu Hsu or Xu Baolu (simplified Chinese: 许宝𫘧; traditional Chinese: 許寶騄; pinyin: Xǔ Bǎolù; September 1, 1910 – December 18, 1970) was a Chinese mathematician noted for his work in probability theory and statistics.

== Life and career ==
Pao-Lu Hsu was born in Beijing on September 1, 1910, with his ancestral home in Hangzhou, Zhejiang Province. He was from a prominent intellectual family. In his childhood, he received solid training in both traditional Chinese and modern western cultures. He graduated from Tsinghua University in 1933, majoring in mathematics. After his graduation, he worked at Peking University as a teacher. In the meantime, he published a joint paper with Tsai-han Kiang (Jiang Zehan) on the numbers of nondegenerate critical points, which showed his solid mathematical foundation and research capability. In 1936, he went to University College London and spent four years studying mathematical statistics. During this period, with his strong mathematical skill combining with advanced statistical ideas, he wrote a series remarkable papers. He earned his Ph.D. in 1938 and Sc.D. in 1940. From London, he returned to China, accepting a professorship in the Department of Mathematics, Peking University. Nevertheless, the ensuing years were a period of great difficulty and hardship for him. During the years 1943–44, he corresponded with Jerzy Neyman (who was by this time at Berkeley) about statistics-related matters, but also mentioning in these letters the great hardship he was suffering, particularly starvation.

In 1945, he went to the United States, visiting the University of California at Berkeley, Columbia University, and the University of North Carolina at Chapel Hill. In 1947, he returned to Beijing and thereafter he was engaged in teaching mathematics at Peking University for more than 20 years. Unfortunately, poor health had dogged Hsu from 1950 onward. Although many concerned about his health repeatedly suggested he go abroad to recuperate, he politely refused, insisting on teaching and continuing his research work.

In 1956, Dr. Hsu was made Director of the first research institute for probability and statistics to be established in China. But his health continued to worsen, forcing him to work at home, which included giving lectures at his home to graduate students and young teachers using a blackboard hanging on a wall of his room.

A month before his death in 1970 his manuscript on the relationship between experimental design and algebraic coding theory was completed, with such being his final legacy. Hsu died in his home on the campus of Peking University on December 18, 1970, from chronic tuberculosis. Found beside his bed the day after his death were piles of manuscripts that "serve as a testimony to the super-human fortitude with which he exerted himself for a period of more than 20 years..." In total, he had published more than 40 papers.

There was a memorial meeting and Pao-Lu Hsu Award in his honor. Hsu is a Fellow of the Institute of Mathematical Statistics (IMS) and Academician of the Academy of Science of China. Memorial meetings were held in 1980, 1990, 2000 & 2010 at Peking University.

Professor Hsu's main research areas were mathematical statistics and probability theory. He was an expert in operating matrix, manipulating characteristic functions and integral transformation. Hsu was a world-class statistician and is considered to be the founder of probability and statistics in China.

He influenced many students such as Theodore Wilbur Anderson, Erich Leo Lehmann, and Chung Kai-lai.

== Hsu's work in statistics ==
In 1938, Hsu's first two statistical papers were published, concerning the Behrens–Fisher problem and an optimal estimate of the variance σ^{2} in Gauss-Markov processes. In another important paper published around this time, Hsu established the first optimal property for hypotheses in the likelihood-ratio test for univariate linear models, which was also the first nonlocal optimal property for any hypothesis specifying the value of more than one parameter. From 1938 to 1945, Hsu published several papers at the forefront of the development of the theory of multivariate analysis. During this time, he obtained several exact or asymptotic estimates of important statistical distributions in the field of multivariate analysis.

== Hsu's work in probability ==
Hsu was an expert in manipulating characteristic functions, which he used as a tool in obtaining the distributions of certain random variables and in determining the limiting distribution of series of random variables (as in the Hsu–Robbins–Erdős theorem for which he is partially named).

Another example of Hsu' work in this field, published around 1940, concerned a solution to the most general form of the Central Limit Theorem, which drew the attention of many famed mathematicians, such as Paul Lévy, William Feller, Andrey Kolmogorov, and Boris Gnedenko. Hsu made contributions to this problem in his paper, "A general weak limit theorem for independent distributions", a manuscript mailed to Kai Lai Chung in 1947. In this paper, Hsu independently obtained a necessary and sufficient condition under which the row sums of a triangular matrix of infinitesimal random variables, independent in each row, will converge in distribution to a given infinitely divisible distribution. Despite the fact that Gnedenko obtained the same result in 1944, Hsu's method is direct and has its own trait.

== Publications ==
- Collected Papers by P. L. Hsu; edited by K.L. Chung, Springer-VerLag. (1983) .New York; ISBN 9780387907253.
- 许宝騄. (1982). 抽样论. 北京, 北京大学出版杜.
