= Schiffe Menschen Schicksale =

German-language monthly defence periodical

Schiffe Menschen Schicksale (abbreviated SMS; English: Ships – People – Fates) is a German-language monthly popular periodical dedicated to naval and maritime history.

== History ==
The maritime magazine has been published since 1993. It is edited by Klaus Gröbig (b. 1956), who has also authored many volumes. The publication with extensive illustrations is aimed at readers with a historical interest in a popularized form. It was initially issued by Koehler (Hamburg) and DBM-Media (Berlin), later by Maximilian-Verlag Schober (Hamburg, until 1999), and subsequently by SMS Verlag für Marinegeschichte UG, based in Berlin (previously located in Kiel and Stade).

Its first volume (Heft) is Glück und Ende der „Bremen“ (Fortune and Fate of the "Bremen") about the fate of Germany's most famous passenger ship between 1928 and the Second World War. After an adventurous return to Germany in 1939, the ship met its end in a fire in 1941.

The reader is informed about the fate of aircraft carriers, battleships, cruisers, explorers, torpedo boats, fast attack craft, destroyers, submarines, auxiliary cruisers, passenger ships, liners, armored cruisers, sailing ships, and related subjects of all classes and eras, particularly about the backgrounds and causes of spectacular shipwrecks and accidents, as well as about memorable events at sea in both peacetime and wartime.

As of September 2025, the series comprises 378 volumes and several special issues:

== Volumes ==
- 1 Glück und Ende der „Bremen“
- 2 „Great Eastern“ – Der erste Ozean-Gigant
- 3 Segelschulschiff „Pamir“ – Der Atlantik blieb Sieger
- 4 Der Untergang der „Andrea Doria“
- 5 Kaiseryacht „Hohenzollern“
- 6 Der Untergang der „Titanic“
- 7 Die Wikinger zur See
- 8 Linienschiff „Friedrich der Große“
- 9 Auf Walfang mit „Jan Wellem“ (de)
- 10 Glanz und Tragödie des Segelschulschiffes „Niobe“
- 11 Motorfahrgastschiff „Monte Rosa“
- 12 U –„Deutschland“
- 13 Russischer Kreuzer „Aurora“
- 14 Fähre „Estonia“
- 15 KdF-Dampfer „Wilhelm Gustloff“
- 16 Die Torpedierung der „Lusitania“
- 17 Schnelldampfer „Cap Polonio“ (de)
- 18 Viermastbark „Kommodore Johnsen“
- 19 Schnelldampfer „Cap Arcona“
- 20 Rotorschiffe „Buckau“ und „Barbara“
- 21 Raddampfkorvette „Danzig“
- 22 Schlachtschiff „Bismarck“
- 24 Kleiner Kreuzer „Dresden“
- 25 Forschungsschiff „Meteor“
- 26 Hilfskreuzer „Wolf“
- 27 Kleiner Kreuzer „Wiesbaden“
- 28 „U 47“
- 29 HAPAG-Dampfer „New York“
- 30 Schlachtschiff „Dunkerque“
- 31 Linienschiff „Schleswig-Holstein“
- 32 Segelschulschiff „Großherzogin Elisabeth“
- 33 Raddampfer „Kaiser Wilhelm“
- 34 Spanische Karavelle „Santa Maria“
- 35 Flugzeugträger „Yorktown“
- 36 Linienschiff „Kjnas Suworow“
- 37 Frachtmotorschiff „Lahnstein“
- 38 Die Trieren des Themistokles
- 39 Passagierdampfer „Berlin“
- 40 Kleiner Kreuzer „Königsberg“
- 41 „Queen Elisabeth 2“
- 42 Flugzeugträger „Hermes“
- 43 Schwerer Kreuzer „Blücher“
- 44 Linienschiff „Queen Charlotte“
- 45 S.M. Unterseeboot „U 3“
- 46 Passagierdampfer „Imperator“
- 47 Kogge „Drögbrod“
- 48 Linienschiff „Schlesien“
- 49 „Admiral Karpfanger“
- 50 Hilfskreuzer „Libau“
- 51 Fünfmastvollschiff „Preussen“
- 52 „Leipzig“
- 53 Der „Eiserne Seehund“
- 54 Kleiner Kreuzer „Emden“
- 55 Schnelldampfer „Columbus“
- 56 Britisches Linienschiff „Victory“
- 57 Leichter Kreuzer „Nürnberg“
- 58 Torpedobootzerstörer „Scharfschütze“
- 59 Britisches U-Boot „Thetis“
- 60 Reichspostdampfer „Manila“
- 61 „U 9“
- 62 Hebeschiffe „Energie“ und „Ausdauer“
- 63 Schwerer Kreuzer „Prinz Eugen“
- 64 NdL-Dampfer „Steuben“
- 65 „Maria von Castilien“
- 66 „U 21“
- 67 Passagierschiff „Europa“
- 68 „Kaiser Wilhelm der Große“
- 69 SMS „Amazone“
- 70/71 Hilfskreuzer „Stier“
- 72/73 Panzerschiff „Admiral Graf Spee“
- 74 SMS „Iltis“ I
- 75 Schulschiff „Pommern“ (de)
- 76 Brit. Kreuzer „Vindictive“
- 77/78 Großer Kreuzer „Goeben“
- 79 Passagierschiff „Monte Cervantes“
- 80 „Admiral Hipper“
- 81 Brit. Flugzeugträger „Ark Royal“
- 82 Passagierschiff „Morro Castle“
- 83 Passagierdampfer „Oceana“
- 84/85 Schlachtschiff „Scharnhorst“
- 86 Großer Kreuzer „Blücher“
- 87 Eisbrecher „Sedov“
- 88 Segelschulschiff „Herzogin Cecilie“
- 89 Hilfskreuzer „Kronprinz Wilhelm“
- 90 Brit. Flugzeugträger „Eagle“
- 91 „U 38“
- 92/93 Jap. Flugzeugträger „Akagi“
- 94 Brigantine „Marie Celeste“
- 95 Panzerfregatte „Erzherzog Ferdinand Max“
- 96 Die Galeeren des „Andrea Doria“
- 97 Schoner „Ayesha“
- 98 Fahrgastschiff „Robert Ley“
- 99 Hilfskreuzer „Prinz Eitel Friedrich“
- 100 Passagierdampfer „United States“
- 101 Flottentorpedoboot „T 27“
- 102 Korvette „Gazelle“
- 103 Eisbrecher „Labrador II“
- 104 Kleiner Kreuzer „Karlsruhe“
- 105 Schlachtschiff „Gneisenau“
- 106 Linienschiff „König“
- 107 Motorschiff „Brandenburg“
- 108 Dampfer „Vestris“
- 109 Passagierschiff „Queen Elizabeth“ I
- 110 Schlachtschiff „Giulio Cesare“
- 111 Brit. Flugzeugträger „Glorious“
- 112 Turbinentanker „Tina Onassis“ (de)
- 113 „U 64“
- 114 „Möwe“
- 115 Brit. Flugzeugträger „Illustrious“
- 116 „U 96“
- 117/118 Segelschulschiff „Albert Leo Schlageter“
- 119 „U 995“
- 120 Fährschiff „Deutschland“
- 121 Brit. Flugzeugträger „Furious“
- 122 Raketen-Schnellboot 713
- 123 Passagierschiff „Champollion“
- 124 Schlachtschiff „Minas Gerais“
- 125 Hilfskreuzer „Atlantis“
- 126 Frachtschiff „Ondo“
- 127 Hilfskreuzer „Orion“
- 128 Flugzeugträger „Graf Zeppelin“
- 129 Kleiner Kreuzer „SMS Frauenlob“
- 130 Dreimastgaleone „Vasa“
- 131 Hilfsstreuminendampfer „Königin Luise“
- 132 Passagierschiff „Normandie“
- 133 Frachter „Goya“
- 134 US-Unterseeboot „S 51“
- 135 Hilfskreuzer „Hansa“
- 136 Kreuzfahrtschiff „Queen Mary 2“
- 137/138 Schwerer Kreuzer „Admiral Scheer“
- 139 Hilfskreuzer „Komet“
- 140 Minensuchboot „M 437“
- 141 Unterseeboot „U 53“
- 142 Hilfskreuzer „Möwe“
- 143 Unterseeboot „U 77“
- 144 Zerstörer „Z 38“
- 145 Zerstörer „Turbine“
- 146 Schlachtschiff „Tirpitz“
- 147 Hilfskreuzer „Seeadler“
- 148 Hilfskreuzer CSS „Alabama“
- 149 Russisches U-Boot „U-434“
- 150/151 U-Bootskreuzer „Kursk“
- 152 Rapidkreuzer SMS „Helgoland“
- 153 Raddampfer „Mississippi Oueen“
- 154 Zerstörer HMS „Hotspur“
- 155/156 Großer Kreuzer SMS „Seydlitz“
- 157 Zerstörer HMS „Cossack“
- 158 Seenotkreuzer „Theodor Heuss“ (de)
- 159/160 Kreuzer „Köln“
- 161 Flugzeugträger USS „Essex“
- 162 Turbinenschiff „Windhuk“ Motorrettungsboot „MR 12“
- 163 Großzerstörer „Charkow“
- 164 Tankmotorschiff „Charlotte Schliemann“
- 165 Zerstörer „Georg Thiele“
- 166 Klipper „Cutty Sark“
- 167 Kreuzer HMS „Belfast“
- 168 Flugzeugträger USS CV-6 „Enterprise“
- 169 Zerstörer SMS „B 110“
- 170 Frachter „Luise Leonhardt“/Feuerschiff „Elbe 1“
- 171 Leichter Kreuzer „Lamotte Piquet“
- 172 Kreuzerfregatte „Gneisenau“
- 173 „U159“
- 174 Flugzeugträger HMAS „Melbourne“
- 175 Marineluftschiff „L 59“
- 176 Turbinenschiff „Bremen“ (V)
- 177 Leichter Kreuzer Hr. Ms. „De Ruyter“
- 178 „U 505“
- 179 Nachtjagd-Leitschiff „Togo“
- 180 Schlachtschiff „Yamato“
- 181 Handelsstörkreuzer „Kormoran“
- 182/183 Schlachtkreuzer HMS „Hood“
- 184 HAPAG-Dampfer „Albert Ballin“
- 185 S-Boote
- 186 Zerstörer Z7 „Hermann Schoemann“
- 187 „Wappen von Hamburg“
- 188 Schlachtschiff „Richelieu“
- 189 Unterseeboot S.M.U. 12
- 190 Auswandern nach Iowa
- 191 Unterseeboot USS SS.218 „Albacore“
- 192/193 Flugzeugträger HMS „Victorious“
- 194 SM Kreuzer „Hertha“
- 195 Schlachtschiff HMS „Warspite“
- 196 Panzerschiff „Deutschland“
- 197/198 Schwerer Kreuzer „Lützow“
- 199/200 S.M. Panzerkreuzer „Scharnhorst“ und „Gneisenau“
- 201 „U 333“
- 202 „Kiautschou“
- 203 S.M. Schlachtschiff „Viribus Unitis“
- 204 HMS „Prince of Wales“
- 205 USS „Liberty“
- 206 S.M.S. „Bayern“
- 207 „DO-X“
- 208 IJN „Kongo“
- 209 S.M. Kleiner Kreuzer „Cormoran“
- 210 Z 20 „Karl Galster“
- 211 Revolution in Kuba Motoryacht „Granma“
- 212 HMS „Upholder“
- 213 USS „Midway“
- 214 Hilfskreuzer „Widder“
- 215 S.M. Kanonenboot „Iltis II“
- 216 Zerstörer „Z 25“
- 217/218 Der Krieg zur See 1914 - 1918
- 219 Kleiner Kreuzer „Emden“
- 220/221 Kreuzer im Küstenkampf
- 222 Passagierschiff „Uruguay“
- 223 „Magellan“
- 224 „U 83 – U 199“
- 225 „Graf Götzen“
- 226 Zerstörer „Z 35, Z 36 und Z 43“
- 227 „R.C. Rickmers“ und „Sophie Rickmers“
- 228 „Thor“
- 229/230 Eisbrecher aus Stettin
- 231 Beute-Zerstörer „ZH 1“
- 232 Panzerkreuzer „Georgios Averoff“
- 233 U-Boot „Rubis“
- 234 Fairplay I, Fairplay V, Fairplay XII
- 235 Schwerer Kreuzer HMS „Exeter“
- 236 Flugzeugträger "HMS Argus"
- 237 Flugzeugträger C59 „Forrestal“
- 238 U-Boot „I 400“
- 239 Schwerer Kreuzer „Zara“
- 240 HMS „Endeavour“ – James Cooks erste Südseereise
- 241 Kanalfährschiff „Duke of York“
- 242 Japanischer Zerstörer „Yukikaze“
- 243 Kanonenboot „Habicht“
- 244 „U 806“ Fernfahrtentyp IX C
- 245 Blockadebrecher „Marie“ (de)
- 246 Leichter Kreuzer „Königsberg“ III
- 247 „F 607“ Marinefährprahm
- 248 Marine-Luftschiff „L 38“
- 249 ZG 3“ Hermes ex „Vasilevs Georgios I“
- 250/251 HMS „Lion“ Admiral Beattys Flaggschiff
- 252 HMS „Manxman“ - Der schnellste Kreuzer der Royal Navy
- 253 Unterseeboot „U-Flak 1“ („U 441“)
- 254/255 Tauchen (Teil 1) 100 Jahre deutsche U-Boote (Teil 2)
- 256 „HMS Resolution“(Captain Cooks 2. und 3. Entdeckerfahrt)
- 257 „U 711“ U-Bootkrieg im Eismeer 1943-45
- 258 „Boote unter Beton“ Die Hamburger U-Boot-Bunker (Teil 1)
- 259 Passagierschiff „München“
- 260 Hapag-Schnelldampfer „Vaterland“ Das große „Werk“ von Albert Ballin
- 261 „Boote unter Beton“ Die Hamburger U-Boot-Bunker (Teil 2)
- 262 INS „Vikrant“ Indiens erster Flugzeugträger
- 263 Flugzeugträger „Indomitable“ Mittelmeer und Ferner Osten
- 264 Kleiner Kreuzer „Hamburg“ Die lange Karriere eines Kleinen Kreuzers
- 265 Minensuchboot „M412“
- 266 Segelschiff „Batavia“
- 267 Die römische Flotte Teil 1: Kampf gegen Karthago
- 268 Linienschiff „Hessen“
- 269 „U 751“ versenkt Flugzeugträger HMS „Audacity“
- 270 Flugzeugträger USS CV-8 „Hornet“
- 271 Leichter Kreuzer „Karlsruhe“
- 272 HMS „Sheffield“ *
- 273 Römische Flotte Teil II „Pompeius“ der Untergang der Republik
- 274 Z 1 Zerstörer „Leberecht Maass“
- 275 Hilfskreuzer „Michel“
- 276 Schwerer Kreuzer „Canarias“
- 277 Fregatte „Jylland“
- 278 Viermastbark „Peking“
- 279 Kleiner Kreuzer „Emden III“
- 280 Joachim Schepkes „U 100“ Ausbildungs- und Frontboot
- 281 Salondampfer „Alexandra“
- 282 Schlachtschiff „New Jersey“
- 283 „Athens Expedition nach Sizilien“
- 284 Zerstörer Z 16 „Friedrich Eckoldt“
- 285 Blockadebrecher „Osorno“
- 286 "U 99"
- 287 Raketenzerstörer "Mölders"
- 288 Leichter Kreuzer HMS "Aurora"
- 289 Torpedoboot "Jaguar"
- 290 Fritz-Julius Lemps "U 110"
- 291 Flugzeugträger CV7 USS „Wasp“
- 292 Die Flotten der Cäsaren
- 293 Minenleger „Drache
- 294 Forschungsschiff „Discovery“
- 295 Schlachtschiff SMS „Nassau“
- 296 Herbert Wohlfahrt und „U 556“
- 297 Iranisches Kanonenboot „Babr“
- 298 Die römische Flotte Teil IV
- 299/300 Schwere Kreuzer „Seydlitz“ und „Lützow“
- 301 Schlachtkreuzer SMS „Von der Tann“
- 302 Der Plastik-Schiffsmodellbau
- 303 Unterseeboot „U 567“
- 304 Die Schildkrötenschiffe des Admiral Yi Sun-sin
- 305 Die fünf Traumschiffe – das Heft zur Fernsehserie
- 306 Hilfskreuzer „Atlantis“ Teil II
- 307 Vor Norwegens langen Küsten
- 308 Torpedoboot „T 2“
- 309 Japanischer Flugzeugträger „Zuikaku“
- 310 Kleiner Kreuzer SMS „Magdeburg“
- 311 „U 131“
- 312 Japanisches Linienschiff „Mikasa“
- 313 Schlachtschiff SMS „Ostfriesland“
- 314 Schiffe im Bild
- 315 Kleiner Kreuzer SMS „Stuttgart“
- 316 Gorch Fock (II)
- 317 Erich Topp’s „U 552“
- 318 CSS „Virginia“
- 319 Die Schatzschiffe des Admiral Zheng He
- 320 Torpedoboot „T 28“
- 321 Friedrich Guggenberger’s „U 81“
- 322 In vertrautem Fahrwasser
- 323 Viermaster „Passat“
- 324 Passagierschiff „Völkerfreundschaft“
- 325 Zerstörer Z 9 „Wolfgang Zenker“
- 326 Adalbert Schnees „U 201“
- 327 Schlachtschiff HMS „Dreadnought“
- 328 Museumsschiff Viermaster „Pommern“
- 329 Die Flakschiffe der Kriegsmarine
- 330 Teddy Suhrens „U 564“
- 331 Kanonenboot SMS „Panther“
- 332 Viermastbark „Kruzenshtern“
- 333 Die Flotte von Byzanz I
- 334 Rolf Mützelburgs „U 203“
- 335 Kleiner Kreuzer SMS „Breslau“
- 336 Ulrich Gabler und sein Ingenieurkontor Lübeck
- 337 Lothar Arnauld de la Perières „U 35“
- 338 Siegfried Wuppermanns Schnellboot „S 56“
- 339 Kleiner Kreuzer „Nürnberg“
- 340 Otto Schuharts „U 29“
- 341 Fluch der Karibik
- 342 „U 459“ und die übrigen U-Tanker der Kriegsmarine
- 343 Schonerbrigg „Greif“ ex Segelschulschiff „Wilhelm Pieck“
- 344 Japanischer Flugzeugträger „Hiryū“
- 345 Heinrich Lehmann-Willenbrocks „U 96“
- 346 Großer Kreuzer „SMS Moltke“
- 347 Torpedoboot „Möwe“
- 348 „U 124“ 1. Teil – Wilhelm Schulz
- 349/350 Bismarck-Komplex
- 351 Die Flotten der Kreuzfahrer
- 352 „U 124“ 2. Teil – Johann Mohr
- 353 US Kreuzer CA 35 „Indianapolis“
- 354 Artillerieschulschiff „Bremse“
- 355 Albrecht Brandis „U 617“
- 356 Trossschiff „Altmark“
- 357 Bundesmarine im Bild
- 358 Otto Pollmanns „UJ 2210“
- 359 Kanonenboote „K 1“ bis „K 4“
- 360 „U 9“ Grauer Hai im Schwarzen Meer
- 361/362 „Passat“ – ein Zeitzeuge berichtet
- 363/364 Werner Fürbringers „UB 110“ und die Flandern U-Boote
- 365 Sowjetisches Atom U-Boot „K 19“
- 366 Japanischer Kreuzer „Mogami“
- 367/368 HMS „Baralong“
- 369/370 Der Untergang der spanischen Armada und der Aufstieg Englands
- 371 Schnellbootgruppe Klose
- 372 Max-Martin Teicherts „U 456“
- 373/374 Befehlshaber Kommandeure Admirale
- 375/376 Sowjetische Swerdlow-Kreuzer in Portsmouth
- 377 Britischer Flugzeugträger HMS „Formidable“
- 378 Zerstörer „Z 28“

Sonderhefte

- Spezial 1 Michiel de Ruyter Bilder aus dem Leben des niederländischen Malers
- Spezial 2 Die italienischen Passagierschiffe Rex und Conte di Savoia
- Spezial 3 Der Seekrieg 1914-1918 Teil I 1914-1915
- Spezial 4 Der Seekrieg 1914-1918 Teil II 1916-1918
- Spezial 5 Als Meteorologe auf dem Hilfskreuzer „Pinguin“
- Spezial 6 Brigg und Bark
- Spezial 7 Standarten und Flaggen der Kaiserlich Deutschen Marine
- Spezial 8 Schifferkompanien in Mecklenburg - Vorpommern
- Spezial 9 Die Seeschlacht am Skagerrak
- Spezial 10 Schoner „R.J. Robertson“

== See also ==
- Otto Mielke (in German)
