= Jiang Lifu =

Chinese mathematician and educator

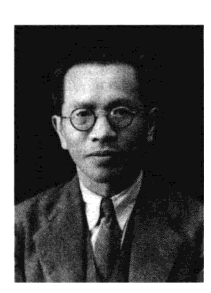
- Born: 4 July 1890; Pingyang County, Wenzhou, Zhejiang, Qing China
- Died: 3 February 1978 (aged 87); Guangzhou, Guangdong, People's Republic of China
- Education: University of California, Berkeley (BS); Harvard University (PhD)
- Children: 1 son

Jiang Lifu (4 July 1890 – 3 February 1978) was a Chinese mathematician. He is described by the Encyclopedia of China as the earliest and most productive pioneer and educator of mathematics in modern China.

== Life ==
Jiang was born in 1890 in Pingyang County in Wenzhou and received his elementary education in Wenzhou and high school education in Hangzhou. Jiang received a Bachelor of Science degree in mathematics from the University of California, Berkeley in 1915 and entered Harvard University in 1916 and obtained his PhD degree there in 1919. Jiang's doctoral advisor at Harvard was Julian Coolidge and his doctoral thesis was "The Geometry of Non-Euclidean Line Sphere Transformatinon". Upon receiving his doctoral degree, he became the second person in modern Chinese history to receive a PhD degree in mathematics. In 1920, Jiang founded the department of mathematics at Nankai University, the first-ever mathematics department of a private university and second-ever mathematics department of a university in modern Chinese history. In 1923, Jiang served as the chairman of the mathematical terminology review committee organized by the Science Society of China and under his leadership, the committee published the first-ever systematic dictionary of mathematical terminology in modern China. Jiang pursued and conducted advanced study and research at University of Hamburg in 1934 and University of Göttingen from 1935 to 1936.

In 1940, during World War II, Jiang was appointed as the chairman of the "Neo-China Mathematics Society" at the National Southwestern Associated University. Jiang was also the chairman of the organizing committee of the Institute of Mathematics of Academia Sinica in China and served as the founding director of the Institute of Mathematics of Academia Sinica in 1947. In 1948, Jiang was elected as an academician of the Academia Sinica.

== Legacy ==
One of Jiang's most notable students, Shiing-shen Chern, one of the greatest mathematicians of the twentieth century, described Jiang as a "saint" and said "in many many years, Mr. Jiang was the foremost leader in the world of mathematics in China." Chern also noted that "I specialize in geometry because of my professor in college, Dr. Jiang" and "my fundamental mathematical education was all given by Mr. Jiang through dictation". Su Buqing once said, "his influence and contribution to mathematics in modern China is so grand that without him, mathematics in China would have been completely different."

== Family ==
Jiang Lifu had a son, Jiang Boju, who is a leader in the field of topology in China and founding dean of the School of Mathematical Sciences at Peking University, the leading school of mathematical study in China.
