= SMS (band) =

Ukrainian pop band

- Origin: Kyiv, Ukraine
- Genres: Pop music based on Acid jazz, Rock n roll, Funk, Rhythm and blues
- Years active: 2004–12 (on hiatus)
- Labels: UniverseMediaUA
- Members: Marina Modina; Anastasia Gavrelyuk; Veronika Tishkina
- Past members: Tatiana Golubkina; Lana Merkulova; Aleksandra Marchenko
- Website: http://www.sms-music.com.ua/

SMS is a Ukrainian female pop-music band that added some competition to the already existing Nu Virgos. It was formed in 2004 by Oleksandr Yaremenko who had an intention to make a quartet similar to Nu Virgos. However, during his search for the necessary talents he decided to make a trio-group. The group performs in both the Ukrainian as well as the Russian languages. The trio performs in the musical theme of the 80s.

== Overview ==
The group was created in 2004 and initially consisted of Marina Modina, Tatiana Golubkina, and Lana Merkulova. The band's music video Lyuby, kokhai mene (Love me, honey), performed in the Ukrainian language, was popular in Ukraine and the Russian Federation.

In 2007, Merkulova was replaced by the 18-year-old Aleksandra Marchenko with whom the band filmed two videos ("Uroky erotiki" and "Posledniy Raz"). In 2008, there were some intentions to recruit a former Playboy playmate Irina Olkhovskaya. In 2009, Marchenko and Golubkina left the group, and the band was in search for the new talents for some time. The new band was composed out of a brunette and the loyal performer of the group Marina to whom were added a red-haired Veronika and a blond Anastasia.

Since its creation, the group has recorded four albums and filmed nine videos which were one of the best in the country for quite sometime. SMS also received numerous national music awards.

== Name ==
According to the group creator Yaremenko, the name for the group came to him in his sleep. It supposedly stands for Sporty, Musical, and Sexy. Besides, every song according to Yaremchenko is his "life experience, worries, feelings that are put into a 4-minute track, hence such music is its own type of "short message" (see SMS).

== Supporting staff ==
- Semen Gorov (video director), currently the group director
- Bunny choreographer, director of the ballet "A-6"
- Angela Lisitsa (costume designer)

== Current members ==
- Marina Modina (Rivne) — vocals
- Anastasia Gavrelyuk (Kyiv) — vocals
- Veronika Tishkina (Odesa) — vocals

== Former members ==
- Tatiana Golubkina — vocals
- Lana Merkulova — vocals
- Aleksandra Marchenko — vocals

== Discography ==
=== Albums ===
1. 2004 - "SMS Format"
2. 2006 - "Telo" (Тело)
3. 2008 - "Hits Of The 80's" (Хиты 80х)
4. 2010 - "Chitai Po Gubakh" (Читай по губам)

=== Singles ===
Some 10+ singles were recorded to this date.

== Awards ==
- Golden Gramophone (by Russkoe Radio)
- Pesnya goda of the Song of the Year festival
- Nasha pisnya
- Golden feather
