= Sphingomyelin synthase =

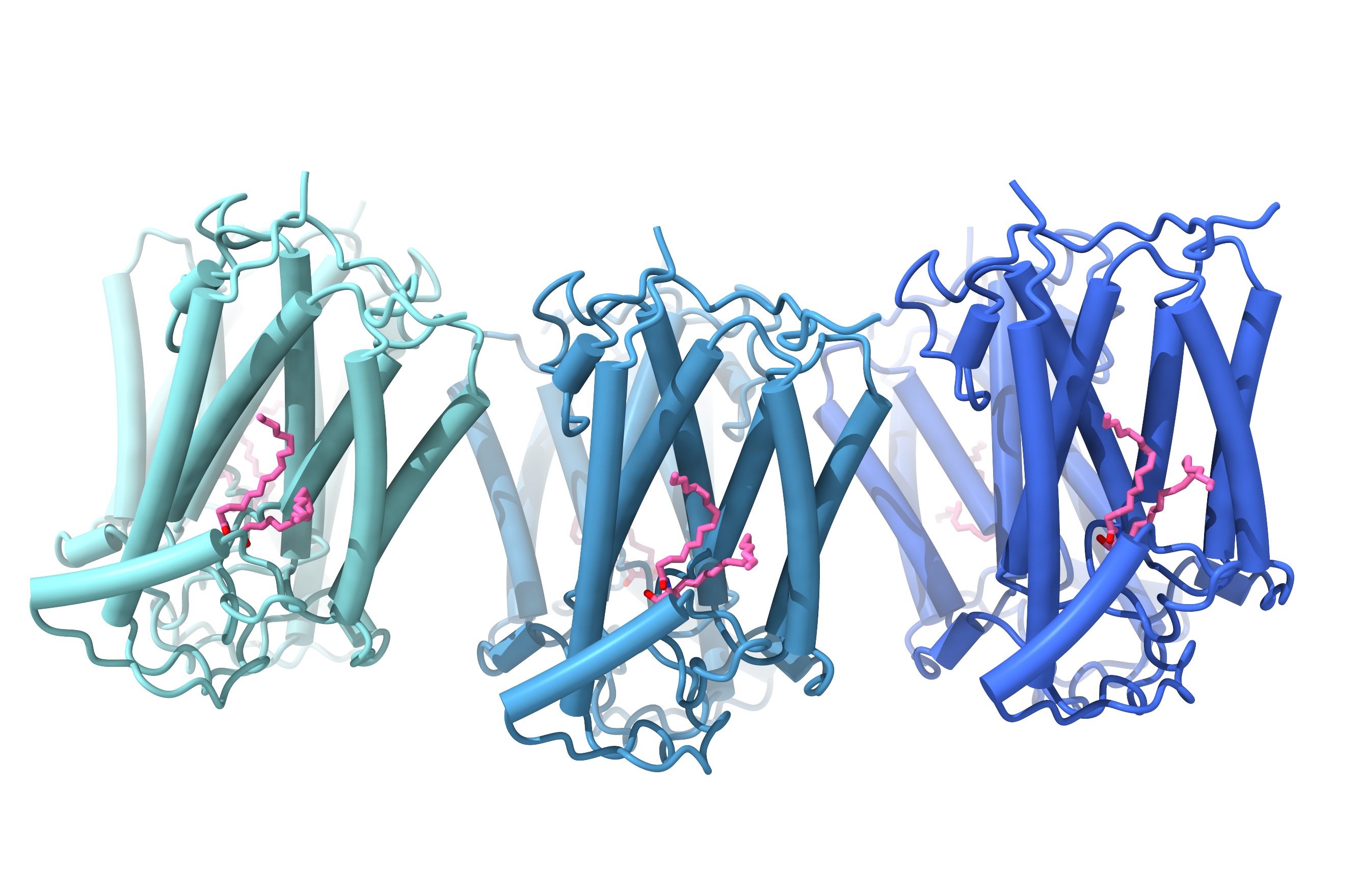
- The cryo-EM structure of human sphingomyelin synthase-related protein in complex with ceramide. PDB 8IJQ

Identifiers
- EC no.: 2.7.8.27

Databases
- IntEnz: IntEnz view
- BRENDA: BRENDA entry
- ExPASy: NiceZyme view
- KEGG: KEGG entry
- MetaCyc: metabolic pathway
- PRIAM: profile
- PDB structures: RCSB PDB PDBe PDBsum
- Gene Ontology: AmiGO / QuickGO
Search
- PMC: articles
- PubMed: articles
- NCBI: proteins

In enzymology, a sphingomyelin synthase (EC 2.7.8.27) is an enzyme that catalyzes the chemical reaction

a ceramide + a phosphatidylcholine $\rightleftharpoons$ a sphingomyelin + a 1,2-diacyl-sn-glycerol

or the reaction using phosphatidylethanolamine instead of phosphatidylcholine to generate ceramide phosphoethanolamine (CPE), a sphingomyelin analog rich in invertebrates, such as insects.

Thus, the two substrates of this enzyme are ceramide and phosphatidylcholine, whereas its two products are sphingomyelin and 1,2-diacyl-sn-glycerol.

This enzyme belongs to the family of transferases, specifically those transferring non-standard substituted phosphate groups. The systematic name of this enzyme class is ceramide:phosphatidylcholine cholinephosphotransferase. Other names in common use include SM synthase, SMS1, and SMS2. SM synthase family also includes the enzyme catalyzing CPE synthesis, named SMSr (SMS-related).

== Structure of SM synthases ==
The high sequence identities shared among the three members of the Sphingomyelin Synthase (SMS) family have intrigued researchers for years. Recent cryo-electron microscopic studies have unveiled a fascinating hexameric organization specifically for SMSr, while biochemical investigations have highlighted the formation of stable dimers by SMS1 and SMS2. Within this hexameric structure, each monomeric unit of SMSr functions as an independent catalytic entity, characterized by six transmembrane helices.

The structural analysis has revealed the presence of a sizable chamber within the helical bundle of SMSr. This chamber serves as the site for catalytic activity, with researchers pinpointing a catalytic pentad, denoted as E-H/D-H-D, strategically positioned at the interface between the lipophilic and hydrophilic segments of the reaction chamber. Furthermore, the elucidation of SMSr's catalytic mechanism has uncovered an intricate two-step synthesis process for SM synthesis. Initially, phosphoethanolamine (or phosphatidylcholine in case of SMS1/2) is hydrolyzed from phosphatidylethanolamine (PE-PLC hydrolysis), followed by the subsequent transfer of the phosphoethanolamine moiety to ceramide.
