= Jiang Boju =

Chinese mathematician (1937-)

Jiang Boju (Chinese: 姜伯驹; born September 1937) is a Chinese mathematician and a professor of Peking University, School of Mathematical Sciences. He is known for his contributions to topology.

== Honors ==
He was elected to be a member of the Chinese Academy of Sciences in 1980 and a fellow of TWAS in 1985.

== Family ==
Jiang Boju's father Jiang Lifu was a mathematician and educator widely regarded as the Father of modern Chinese mathematics.
