= Spectrum News 1 (Massachusetts) =

- Country: United States
- Network: Spectrum News
- Affiliates: NECN (news sharing partner); WTAG (radio partner); Telegram & Gazette (print partner)
- Headquarters: Worcester, Massachusetts

Ownership
- Owner: Charter Communications

History
- Former names: WGMC, Charter TV3

Links
- Website: spectrumnews1.com/ma/worcester

Spectrum News 1 Worcester (formerly Charter TV3) is a regional cable news network, with operations located in Worcester and Pittsfield, Massachusetts. Owned by Charter Communications, the network is exclusive to customers of that company's Spectrum cable service in the New England region, mainly to customers west of Boston's Route 128 beltline to the New York state line.

Its creation arose out of the former news operation of the public access station Charter TV3, which was based in Worcester and existed until October 23, 2020, along with a request from customers and politicians to provide a full-time news operation for viewers outside of the Boston television market who are traditionally unable to get televised state news outside of the two television news operations in Springfield, Massachusetts, and otherwise (especially for The Berkshires region) must watch local news from Albany, New York, which is traditionally biased towards New York State from the Albany–Schenectady–Troy, New York media market.

== Background ==
Charter TV3 telecasts in central Massachusetts and part of southern New Hampshire and northeastern Connecticut. The station also broadcasts in the town of Shrewsbury, Massachusetts.

The flagship program, Worcester News Tonight broadcasts weeknights on Charter TV3. Worcester News Tonight is the only television news and sports program serving Central New England. The evening show telecasts at 6:00PM, 6:30PM and 9:00PM on Charter TV3. The evening newscast features stories by the Worcester News Tonight News Reporters Olivia Lemmon, Ana Bottary, Brittany Schaefer, Cam Jandrow, Chandler Walsh and Roslyn Flaherty , sports with Kevin Shea & Andy Lacombe and weather with NECN's Matt Noyes. The Worcester News Tonight 6pm News is presented by Olivia Lemmon and The "Worcester News Tonight 10pm News" is presented by Ana Bottary. The show rebroadcasts at 11:00PM, 11:30PM, and 2:30AM the following morning. The 10pm News features updated LOCAL news, weather and an extended sports segment with Kevin Shea.

The station's signature sports program is the Friday Night Football Frenzy, a weekly highlight program showcasing central Massachusetts high school football. Charter TV3 also provides local sports coverage, including game telecasts of select Worcester Bravehearts and Pawtucket Red Sox baseball games. Charter TV3 Sports concentrates its coverage on local high school, college and professional athletics. Every weeknight, Kevin Shea and Andy Lacombe report on the latest sports news on Worcester News Tonight. Charter TV3 Sports schedules live, on-location telecasts of sporting events year-round. These live telecasts include high school and College of the Holy Cross football, high school and Holy Cross basketball, baseball games with the PawSox and Worcester Bravehearts, and hockey games with the Worcester Railers.

Charter TV3 also provides community-based programming. Every weekday, Charter TV3 simulcasts WTAG's, Jim Polito Show and The Jordan Levy Show featuring the Worcester politico and former mayor, Jordan Levy. Charter TV3 programming includes Central Mass. Chronicles, a round-table discussion show moderated by Allen Fletcher. The Mayor's Forum features Worcester Mayor Joseph Petty. Other local programs include The Hank Stolz Experience.

The network was discontinued on October 23, 2020, as Charter expanded Spectrum News 1 Massachusetts's operation further across its New England service area, with some Worcester-based programming (along with former personnel from Worcester News Tonight) already transferred onto the Spectrum News 1 schedule. WNT itself had switched to the design language and graphics package utilized by all Spectrum News operations in June 2019.

== See also ==
- Spectrum News
- NECN
- Media in Worcester, Massachusetts
