= Mass media in Worcester, Massachusetts =

This article gives an overview of the mass media in Worcester, Massachusetts, United States.

== Print ==
- The Catholic Radical is a Catholic Worker Movement newspaper published in Worcester with a circulation of about 2,000. Founded in 1986, it is the city's oldest continuously published progressive journal.
- City Living Magazine is a bimonthly luxury lifestyle magazine distributed throughout Central Massachusetts.
- In City Times is an independently owned and published bi-weekly newspaper covering news stories primarily from the city.
- Pulse Magazine is a monthly magazine covering the social scene and other news stories of Worcester.
- The Radiant is a monthly newspaper published by the African Community Development Corporation, focused on emerging African communities.
- Vocero Hispano is a Spanish-language weekly newspaper published in Worcester and distributed beyond Central Massachusetts, targeting Latino communities.
- Worcester Magazine is a publication owned by Gannett that covers news and events in Worcester County.
- The Worcester Telegram & Gazette is Worcester's only daily newspaper. The paper, known locally as "the Telegram" or "the T and G," is owned by Gannett.

== Broadcast ==
- WBZ-TV is the CBS television station in Worcester and Boston, and is owned and operated by CBS News and Stations (formerly Viacom Television Stations Group and CBS Television Stations). WBZ-TV 4 owns a live Doppler weather radar which is located at Worcester Regional Airport. This radar gives live updates for all weather in the area.
- WCTR, cable channel 3, is Worcester's local news television station, broadcasting on Charter Communications' cable channel 3. Produced partly by NECN, Worcester News Tonight is a daily 30-minute news segment reporting on events in the city and in surrounding towns. Their anchors include Andy Lacombe, Kenneth Craig, Katie Daly and Kevin Shea.
- WCCA, channel 13, is Worcester's public-access television cable TV station. It features about 80 different programs, either sponsored or produced by Worcester residents. Programming is in English, Spanish, Albanian, Greek, Haitian creole, and other languages. Community Vision is a locally produced, 30-minute weekend news show.
- WUNI-TV, channel 27, is the only major over-the-air broadcast television station in Worcester. Formerly independent, it is now an affiliate of the Spanish Univision network.
- WCRN/830 is Worcester's only 50,000-watt radio station. Broadcasting a talk format, they also broadcast UMass athletics, the New England Surge professional indoor football team and the Boston Red Sox, and was the radio home of Worcester Tornadoes baseball games.
- WORC/1310 is a Spanish-format radio station owned by the Gois family. Up until the Summer of 2004 WORC featured a mixture of local and syndicated talk shows in English. In addition WORC had a Saturday night oldies show and carried New York Yankees baseball.
- WTAG/580 is a local talk radio station owned by iHeartMedia, along with longtime sister station WSRS. The morning show is hosted by Hank Stolz and Sherman Whitman, and former Worcester Mayor Jordan Levy hosts a show in the afternoon (simulcast on WCTR). It also carries many syndicated radio shows. The station is also the home of Worcester Sharks hockey and Worcester Tornadoes baseball.
- WVEI/1440 (formerly WWTM) is a 5,000-watt radio station that primarily simulcasts Boston's WEEI 850, including local coverage of the Boston Red Sox.
- WCHC/88.1 is the College of the Holy Cross's radio station. The station features a variety of music, mostly played by students or other members of the College community. The station also broadcasts Holy Cross sporting events, mainly football, basketball, and hockey.
- WCUW/91.3 was once the Clark University radio station (where "CUW" stood for "Clark University Worcester"). It is now a community radio station with studios on Main Street. WCUW is known for its conspicuous breadth of programming, which spans dozens of languages and genres.
- WICN/90.5, "New England's Jazz & Folk Station," began as Worcester's Inter-Collegiate Network in 1969, and has been a member of NPR since 1980.
- WSRS/96.1 broadcasts an adult contemporary format, and is often (according to Arbitron ratings) the No. 1 station in Worcester.
- WXLO/104.5, licensed to nearby Fitchburg, broadcasts a hot adult contemporary format. It is the home of the XLO Morning Show with Zito & Jen.

== Internet ==
- This Week in Worcester is a local and independently owned digital news publisher founded in 2017 that features coverage of issues relevant to Worcester and Worcester County.
- WorcesterTV.com is a website featuring local TV shows such as Car Dealer TV, Worcester Auto Showcase and Real Estate TV.
- LiteFavorites.com is an online radio station specializing in continuous soft hits with less talk. It broadcasts 24 hours a day from Worcester to the world.
- Worcester Indymedia is the local branch of the international Indymedia collective. Worcester Indymedia is a community-based news site committed to amplifying the voices of everyday people and especially those working for justice and equality in Central Massachusetts and around the world. Worcester Indymedia is open to everyone and features open publishing which allows instantaneous web publishing to all.
- Worcesterite is a community website focusing on Worcester culture, music, technology, politics, art, and other community-related topics.
- Worcester Love is an online video guide about Worcester County-Central Massachusetts with an emphasis on locally owned businesses, cultural diversity, and environmental sustainability.
- Real Worcester is a front page for news, blogs, and events listings for Worcester and the surrounding area.
- A Show About Worcester is an almost weekly TV show uncovering Worcester news and personalities.

== See also ==
- List of radio stations in Massachusetts
