= Mayoral elections in Worcester, Massachusetts =

Elections are held every two years to elect the mayor of Worcester, Massachusetts.

Worcester held its first direct election for mayor in 1987. The city has a council–manager government in which the mayor's role is to chair both the Worcester City Council and the city's school committee.

== Election system ==
Popular elections for mayor were re-instituted in Worcester after the city's voters approved a new city charter in 1985.

In order to be elected mayor in Worcester, a person must place first in the mayor's race and also finish among the top six in the at-large city council election, being also elected a councilor at large. An individual cannot be elected mayor without additionally winning an at-large city council seat.

In addition, the candidate elected to the office of councilor at large who receives the second-highest number of votes for the office of mayor will become vice-chair of the Worcester City Council.

== 19th century elections ==
=== 1865 ===
In December 1865, Republican nominee James B. Blake was elected mayor of Worcester, defeating Democratic nominee D. Waldo Lincoln.

=== 1866 ===
In December 1866, incumbent Worcester Mayor James B. Blake (a Republican) was re-elected to a second term, facing only a scattering of votes against him.

=== 1867 ===
In December 1867, incumbent Worcester Mayor James B. Blake (a Republican) was re-elected to a third term, defeating Democratic nominee Isaac Davis

=== 1868 ===
In December 1868, incumbent Worcester Mayor James B. Blake (a Republican) was re-elected to a fourth term, facing only a scattering of votes against him.

=== 1869 ===
In December 1869, incumbent Worcester Mayor James B. Blake (a Republican) was re-elected to a fifth term, defeating Democratic nominee J. Henry Hill.

=== 1870 ===
In December 1870, incumbent Worcester Mayor James B. Blake (a Republican) was re-elected to a sixth term, defeating Democratic nominee J. Henry Hill. However, Blake died days after the election.

=== 1897 ===
In December 1897, Republican nominee Rufus B. Dodge was elected mayor of Worcester.

=== 1898 ===
In December 1898, Republican incumbent Rufus B. Dodge was re-elected mayor of Worcester.

=== 1899 ===
In December 1899, Republican incumbent Rufus B. Dodge was re-elected to a third term as mayor of Worcester.

== 1987 mayoral election ==
1987 Worcester mayoral election
- November 3, 1987
- Turnout: 55.65%
Nominee	Jordan Levy	John B. Anderson	Gustaf Coontz
Popular vote	23,163	9,243	2,434
Percentage	63.65%	25.40%	6.69%
Mayor before election
Thomas J. Early
Elected mayor
Jordan Levy
Independent

The 1987 Worcester, Massachusetts mayoral election was held on November 3, 1987. The first ever election under held the new method of popular election for mayor, it saw the election of Jordan Levy to a second nonconsecutive term as mayor.

=== Candidates ===
- John B. Anderson, at-large City Council member since 1976 and former mayor (1986)
- Gustaf Coontz
- Joseph Diliberto
- Jordan Levy, City Council member since 1975 and former mayor (1980–1981)

=== Results ===
1987 mayoral election results
Candidate	Votes	%
Jordan Levy	23,163	63.65
John B. Anderson	9,243	25.40
Gustaf Coontz	2,434	6.69
Joseph F. Diliberto	1,550	4.26
Total votes	36,390	100

In the at-large City Council election, Levy placed first, Anderson placed fourth, Coontz placed tenth, and Donovan placed thirteenth.

== 1989 mayoral election ==
1989 Worcester mayoral election
- November 7, 1989
- Turnout: 39.08%
Nominee	Jordan Levy	Lynne H. Simonds
Popular vote	19,198	5,358
Percentage	70.58%	19.70%
Mayor before election
Jordan Levy
Independent
Elected mayor
Jordan Levy
Independent

The 1989 Worcester, Massachusetts mayoral election was held on November 7, 1989. It saw the reelection of Jordan Levy to a third overall, and second-consecutive term (his second term as a popularly elected mayor).

=== Candidates ===
- Joseph Diliberto, mayoral candidate in 1987
- Margaret Donovan
- Jordan Levy, incumbent mayor
- Lynne Simonds

=== Results ===
1989 mayoral election results
Candidate	Votes	%
Jordan Levy (incumbent)	19,198	70.58
Lynne H. Simonds	5,358	19.70
Joseph F. Diliberto	1,358	4.99
Margaret M. Donovan	1,285	4.72
Total votes	27,199	100

In the at-large City Council general election, Levy placed first, Simonds placed ninth, Diliberto placed eleventh, and Donovan placed twelfth.

== 1991 mayoral election ==
1991 Worcester mayoral election
- November 5, 1991
- Turnout: 44.42%
Nominee	Jordan Levy	Timothy J. Cooney, Jr.
Popular vote	15,003	8,478
Percentage	45.38%	25.64%
Nominee	Konstantina Lukes	William Coleman
Popular vote	7,403	2,177
Percentage	22.39%	6.59%
Mayor before election
Jordan Levy
Independent
Elected mayor
Jordan Levy
Independent

The 1991 Worcester, Massachusetts mayoral election was held on November 5, 1991. It saw the reelection of Jordan Levy to a fourth overall, and third-consecutive term (his third term as a popularly elected mayor).

=== Candidates ===
- William S. Coleman, III
- Timothy J. Cooney, Jr., city councilor since 1980 and former mayor of Worcester (1987)
- Jordan Levy, incumbent mayor
- Konstantina Lukes, at-large City Council member since 1990

=== Results ===
1991 mayoral election results
Candidate	Votes	%
Jordan Levy (incumbent)	15,003	45.38
Timothy J. Cooney, Jr.	8,478	25.64
Konstantina B. Lukes	7,403	22.39
William S. Coleman, III	2,177	6.59
Total votes	33,061	100

In the at-large City Council general election, Levy placed first, Cooney placed third, Lukes placed sixth, and Coleman placed eighth.

== 1993 mayoral election ==
1993 Worcester mayoral election
- November 2, 1993
Nominee	Raymond Mariano	John B. Anderson	Konstantina Lukes
Popular vote	13,271	11,389	6,105
Percentage	41.14%	35.31%	18.93%
Mayor before election
Jordan Levy
Independent
Elected mayor
Raymond Mariano
Democratic

The 1993 Worcester, Massachusetts mayoral election was held on November 2, 1993. It saw the election of Raymond Mariano.

Incumbent mayor Jordan Levy did not seek reelection.

=== Campaign ===
There were enough candidates in the at-large city council in 1995 that a primary was mandated for it, which was held in mid-September. Due to the laws requiring that a mayor also be elected an at-large city councilor, anyone who wanted to compete in the mayoral race would need to be on the ballot in the at-large City Council primary and advance to the at-large City Council general election if they hoped to be elected mayor.

Ultimately the mayoral candidates on the ballot were John B. Anderson, Austin A. Heath, Konstantina Lukes, and Raymond Mariano. All four had been among those that advanced to the at-large City Council general election from the primary, with Anderson placing first, Mariano placing second, Lukes placing fourth, and Heath placing tenth.

Candidate John B. Anderson, who served many years as a city councilor, had previously served as a City Council-appointed mayor in 1986.

=== Candidates ===
- John B. Anderson, at-large city council member since 1976 and former mayor (1986)
- Austin A. Heath
- Konstantina Lukes, at-large city council member since 1990
- Raymond Mariano, city council member since 1982

=== Results ===
1993 mayoral election results
Candidate	Votes	%
Raymond V. Mariano	13,271	41.14
John B. Anderson	11,389	35.31
Konstantina B. Lukes	6,105	18.93
Austin A. Heath	1,437	4.46
Others	54	0.17
Total votes	32,256	100

In the at-large City Council general election, Mariano placed first, Anderson placed second, Lukes placed third, and Heath placed ninth.

== 1995 mayoral election ==
1995 Worcester mayoral election
- November 7, 1995
Nominee	Raymond Mariano	Robert J. Hennigan	William Coleman
Popular vote	17,571	4,077	1,410
Percentage	76.20%	17.68%	6.11%
Mayor before election
Raymond Mariano
Democratic
Elected mayor
Raymond Mariano
Democratic

The 1995 Worcester, Massachusetts mayoral election was held on November 7, 1995. It saw the reelection of Raymond Mariano.

=== Campaign ===
There were enough candidates in the at-large city council in 1995 that a primary was mandated for it, which was held in mid-September. Due to the laws requiring that a mayor also be elected an at-large city councilor, anyone who wanted to compete in the mayoral race would need to be on the ballot in the at-large City Council primary and advance to the at-large City Council general election if they hoped to be elected mayor.

Ultimately the mayoral candidates on the ballot were incumbent mayor Raymond Mariano and challengers William Coleman and Robert J. Hennigan. All three had been among those that advanced to the at-large City Council general election from the primary, with Mariano placing first in the at-large city council primary, Hennigan placing fourth, and Coleman placing twelfth.

=== Candidates ===
- William "Bill" Coleman III, mayoral candidate in 1991
- Robert J. Hennigan Jr.
- Raymond Mariano, incumbent mayor since 1993

=== Results ===
1995 mayoral election results
Candidate	Votes	%
Raymond V. Mariano (incumbent)	17,571	76.20
Robert J. Hennigan Jr.	4,077	17.68
William Coleman III	1,410	6.11
Others	80	0.35
Total votes	23,058	100

In the at-large City Council election, Mariano placed first and Hennigan placed ninth, and Coleman placed eleventh.

== 1997 mayoral election ==
1997 Worcester mayoral election
- November 4, 1997
Nominee	Raymond Mariano	Bill Coleman
Popular vote	18,670	4,169
Percentage	81.75%	18.25%
Mayor before election
Raymond Mariano
Democratic
Elected mayor
Raymond Mariano
Democratic

The 1997 Worcester, Massachusetts mayoral election was held on November 4, 1997. It saw the reelection of Raymond Mariano to a third consecutive term.

=== Candidates ===
- Bill Coleman, community activist, candidate for mayor in 1991, 1995
- Raymond Mariano, incumbent mayor since 1993

=== Results ===
1999 mayoral election results
Candidate	Votes	%
Raymond V. Mariano (incumbent)	18,670	81.75
Bill Coleman	4,169	18.25
Total votes	22,839	100

In the at-large City Council election, Mariano placed first and Coleman placed tenth.

== 1999 mayoral election ==
1999 Worcester mayoral election
- November 3, 1999
Nominee	Raymond Mariano	Konstantina Lukes
Popular vote	13,939	8,518
Percentage	59.08%	36.10%
Mayor before election
Raymond Mariano
Democratic
Elected mayor
Raymond Mariano
Democratic

The 1999 Worcester, Massachusetts mayoral election was held on November 3, 1999. It saw the reelection of Raymond Mariano to a fourth consecutive term.

=== Candidates ===
- George A. Fox
- Konstantina Lukes, Worcester City Council at-large member since 1990 and mayoral candidate in 1993
- Raymond Mariano, incumbent mayor since 1993

=== Results ===
1999 mayoral election results
Candidate	Votes	%
Raymond V. Mariano (incumbent)	13,939	59.08
Konstantina B. Lukes	8,518	36.10
George A. Fox	1,016	4.31
Others	121	0.51
Total votes	23,594	100

In the at-large City Council election, Mariano placed first, Lukes placed third, and Fox placed eleventh.

== 2001 mayoral election ==
2001 Worcester mayoral election
- November 6, 2001
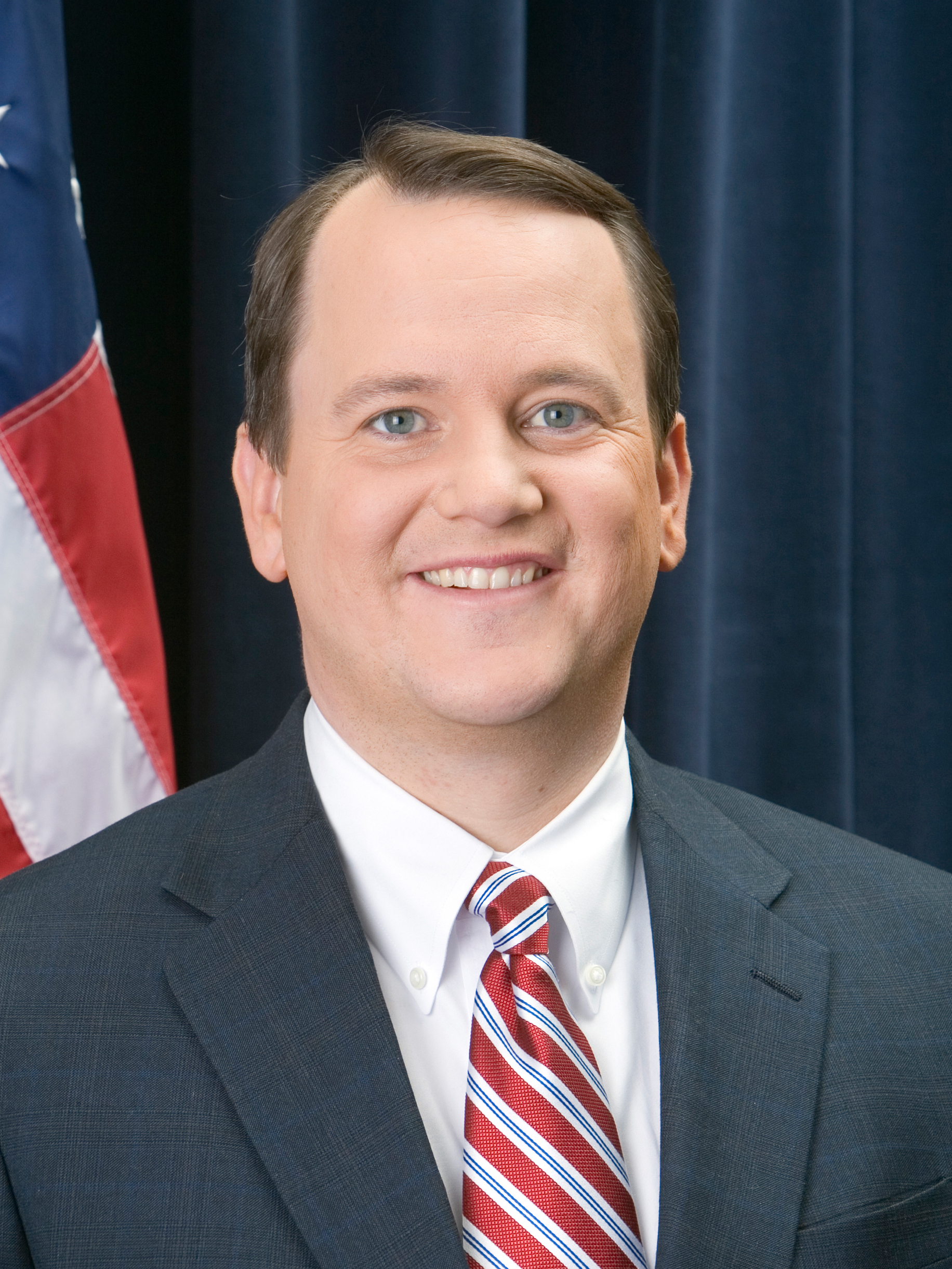

Nominee	Tim Murray	William Coleman
Popular vote	18,209	4,119
Percentage	81.55%	18.45%
Mayor before election
Raymond Mariano
Democratic
Elected mayor
Tim Murray
Democratic

The 2001 Worcester, Massachusetts mayoral election was held on November 6, 2001. It saw the election of Tim Murray.

Incumbent mayor Raymond Mariano did not seek reelection.

=== Candidates ===
- William Coleman, III, community activist, candidate for mayor in 1991 and 1995
- Tim Murray, member of Worcester City Council since 1998

=== Results ===
2001 mayoral election results
Candidate	Votes	%
Timothy P. Murray	18,209	81.55
William Coleman, III	4,119	18.45
Total votes	22,328	

Murray also finished first in the at-large city council election. Coleman finished eighth. Since Coleman, the second-place finisher, failed to be elected an at-large city council, he was not elected vice-chair of the Worcester City Council.

== 2003 mayoral election ==
2003 Worcester mayoral election
- November 4, 2003
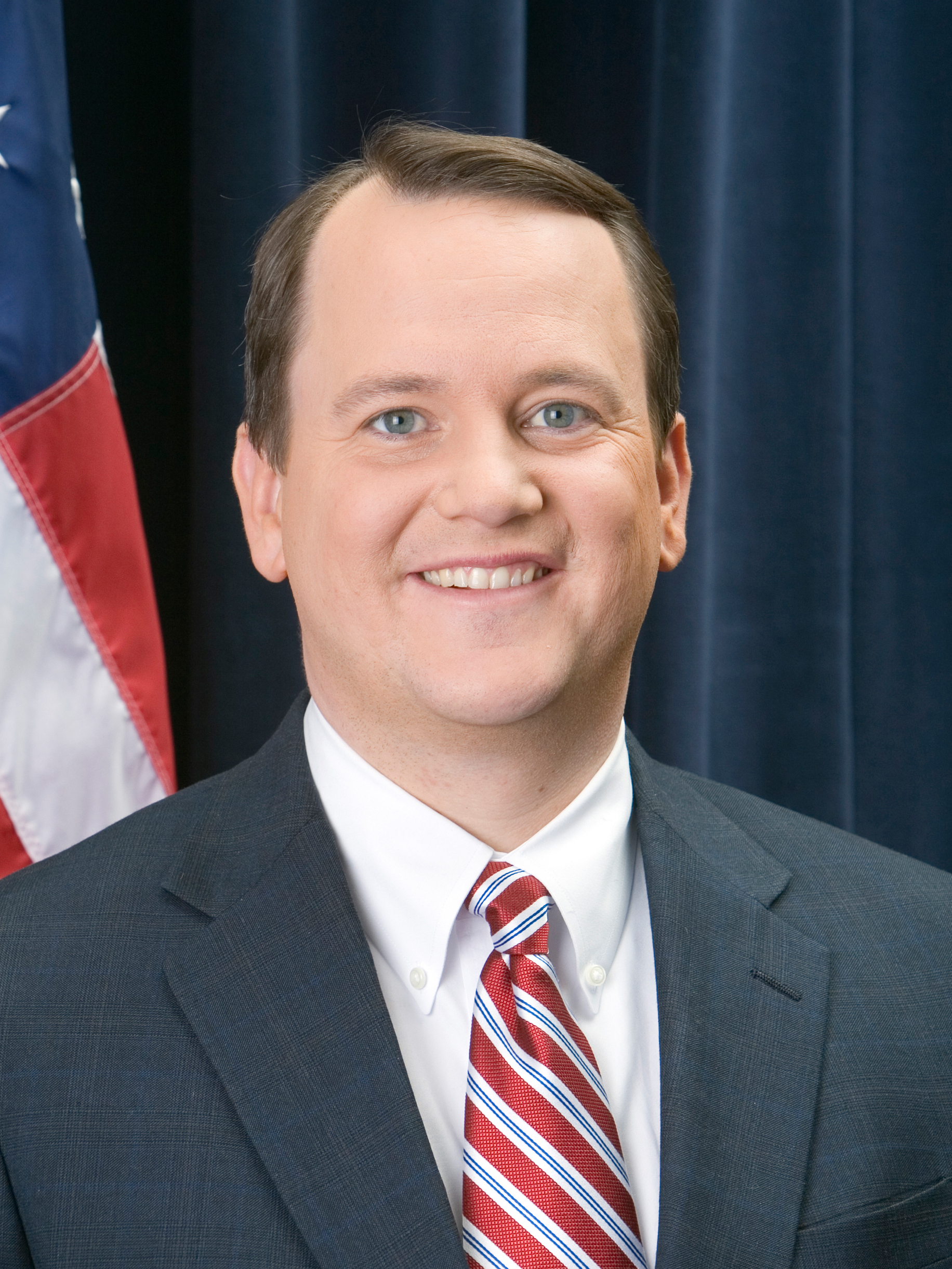

Nominee	Tim Murray	Juan Gomez	William Coleman
Popular vote	10,411	2,043	1,881
Percentage	72.62%	14.26%	13.12%
Mayor before election
Tim Murray
Democratic
Elected mayor
Tim Murray
Democratic

The 2003 Worcester, Massachusetts mayoral election was held on November 4, 2003. It saw the reelection of incumbent mayor Tim Murray to a second term.

=== Candidates ===
- William Coleman, III, community activist candidate for mayor in 1991, 1995, 1997, and 2001
- Juan Gomez, Worcester City Council at-large member since 2000
- Tim Murray, incumbent mayor

=== Results ===
2003 mayoral election results
Candidate	Votes	%
Timothy P. Murray (incumbent)	10,411	72.62
Juan A. Gomez	2,043	14.26
William Coleman, III	1,881	13.12
Total votes	14,335	

Murray also finished first in the at-large city council election. Coleman finished second, Gomez finished fifth, Coleman finished seventh. Gomez, by rules of the city charter, became the vice-chair of the Worcester City Council.

== 2005 mayoral election ==
2005 Worcester mayoral election
- November 8, 2005
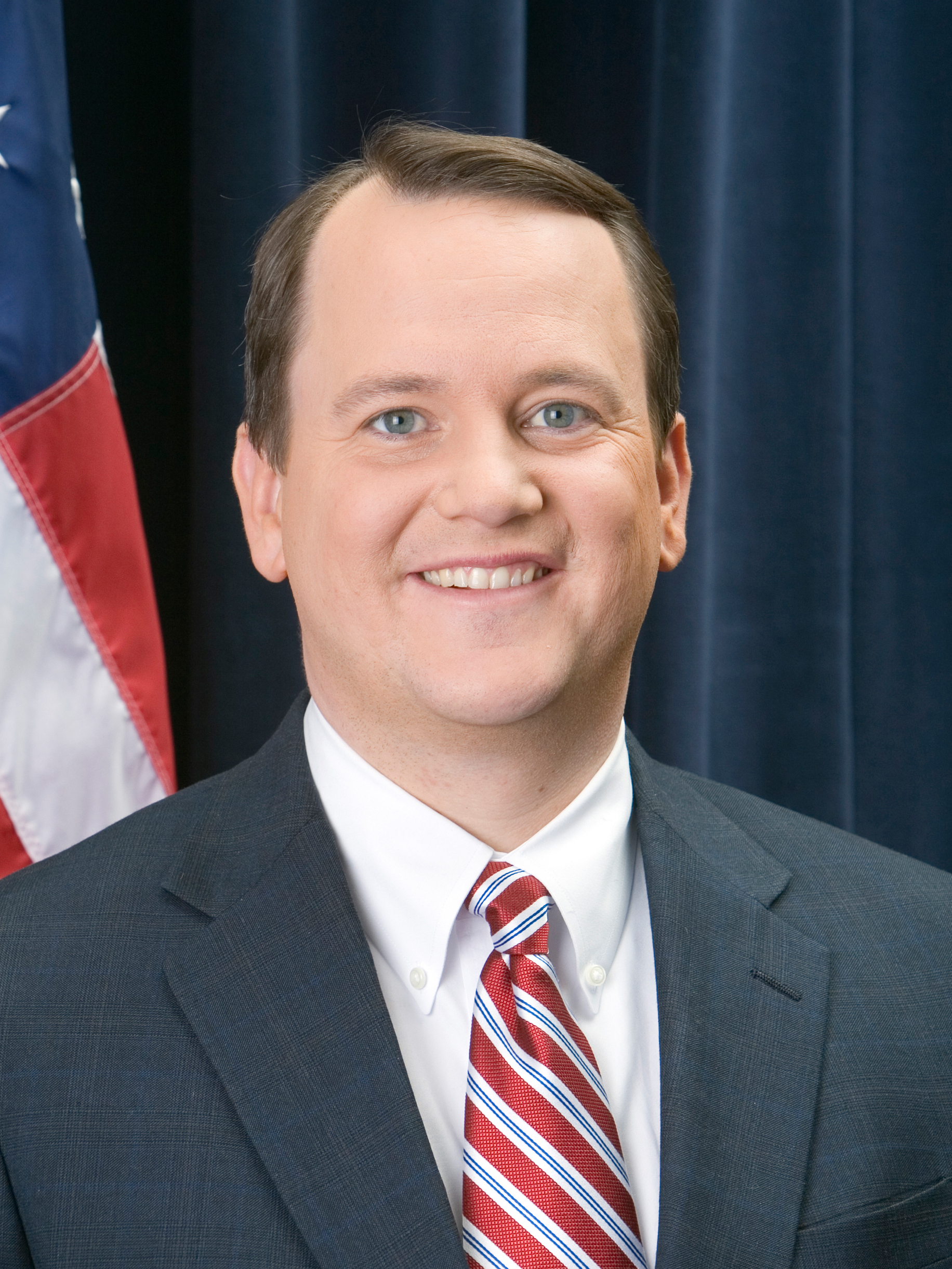

Nominee	Tim Murray	Konstantina Lukes	Juan Gomez
Popular vote	10,085	5,352	1,504
Percentage	52.50%	27.86%	7.83%
Nominee	William McCarthy	William Coleman
Popular vote	1,285	985
Percentage	6.69%	5.13%
Mayor before election
Tim Murray
Democratic
Elected mayor
Tim Murray
Democratic

The 2005 Worcester, Massachusetts mayoral election was held on November 8, 2005. It saw the reelection of incumbent mayor Tim Murray to a third term.

=== Campaign ===
Incumbent mayor Tim Murray most significant challenger was City Council member Konstantina Lukes, who had been a frequent critic of Murray.

While running for mayoral reelection, Murray had already begun his campaign for the 2006 Massachusetts lieutenant gubernatorial nomination.

=== Candidates ===
- William Coleman, III, community activist candidate for mayor in 1991, 1995, 2001 and 2003
- Juan Gomez, Worcester City Council at-large member since 2000, candidate for mayor in 2003
- Konstantina Lukes, Worcester City Council at-large member since 1990, mayoral candidate in 1993 and 1999
- William McCarthy, college professor, former Connecticut state trooper, executive assistant in the Louisiana Office of Alcohol and Tobacco Control from 1996 to 1999
- Tim Murray, incumbent mayor

=== Results ===
2005 mayoral election results
Candidate	Votes	%
Timothy P. Murray (incumbent)	10,085	52.50
Konstantina B. Lukes	5,352	27.86
Juan A. Gomez	1,504	7.83
William J. McCarthy	1,285	6.69
William Coleman, III	985	5.13
Total votes	19,211	

Murray also finished first in the at-large city council election. Lukes finished second, Gomez finished eighth, Coleman finished ninth, and McCarthy finished tenth. Lukes, by the rules of the city charter, became the vice-chair of the Worcester City Council.

== 2007 mayoral election ==
2007 Worcester mayoral election
- November 6, 2007
Nominee	Konstantina Lukes	Frederick C. Rushton
Popular vote	7,507	7,391
Percentage	36.15%	35.59%
Nominee	Gary Rosen	William Coleman
Popular vote	4,552	1,318
Percentage	21.92%	6.35%
Mayor before election
Konstantina B. Lukes
Democratic
Elected mayor
Konstantina B. Lukes
Democratic

The 2007 Worcester, Massachusetts mayoral election was held on November 6, 2007. It saw the reelection of incumbent mayor Konstantina B. Lukes, who had been appointed to the position earlier that year after Tim Murray resigned to become Lieutenant Governor of Massachusetts.

Lukes became the city's first elected female mayor as a result of this election.

=== Candidates ===
- William Coleman, III, community activist candidate for mayor in 1991, 1995, 2001, 2003, and 2005
- Konstantina Lukes, incumbent mayor, Worcester City Council at-large member since 1990, mayoral candidate in 1993, 1999 and 2005
- Gary Rosen, Worcester City Council at-large member since 2006 and 1996–97, former five-term Worcester School Committee member
- Frederick C. Rushton, Worcester City Council member and attorney

==== Withdrawn candidates ====
- Dennis L. Irish, Worcester City Council at-large member
- Mike C. Perotto, Worcester City Council at-large member

=== Campaign ===
Lukes saw two strong challengers, Rushton and Rosen.

Rather than issues, the election largely focused on the personality and the leadership style of Lukes.

Lukes and Rushton were the best-funded candidates. Lukes managed to raise $31,381 for her campaign. Rushton managed to raise $80,000 for his campaign.

Despite the fact that Lukes identified as a Democrat, the city's Democratic Party leaders sought to unseat her. They hoped to coalesce opposition to Lukes behind a single candidate, and ultimately Rushton became their candidate. Rushton would ultimately receive most of the endorsements from major Democratic politicians in the region. Rushton's brother-in-law, Worcester County's new District Attorney Joseph D. Early, appeared at campaign events for him, marking the first time in decades that a District Attorney had involved himself in a political campaign.

There was an unusually large field of candidates running to be at-large city councilors in 2007. This field large enough that a primary was mandated for the at-large city council election, which was held in mid-September. Due to the laws requiring that a mayor also be elected an at-large city councilor, anyone who wanted to compete in the mayoral race (whether they had announced yet or not) would need to be on the ballot in the at-large City Council primary and advance to the at-large City Council general election if they hoped to be elected mayor. While it was not at all required that mayoral candidates declare their candidacies before the at-large City Council primary, four candidates already had declared their candidates. After the at-large City Council primary, in which Lukes placed second among all candidates, and Rushton placed third, two of the candidates, dropped-out of the mayoral race. These were Dennis L. Irish and Mike C. Perotto, who had respectively placed fifth and eighth out of all candidates in the at-large City Council primary. This bolstered the Democratic Party's hopes of coalescing opposition to Lukes around a single candidate, which had emerged to be Rushton.

Rosen declared his candidacy after the at-large City Council primary, in which he had placed first. Rosen's entrance into the race posed an obstacle to the Democratic Party leadership's hopes of coalescing opposition to Lukes behind a single candidate.

As of early October, Lukes and Rushton were the only two candidates with campaign websites.

=== Finances ===
Candidate	Receipts	Expenditures
William Coleman III	$854.72	$839.52
Konstantina Lukes	$31,381.00	$25,406.41
Gary Rosen	$14,631.00	$15,148.94
Frederick C. Rushton	$78,668.99	$83,589.73
Total	$125,535.71	$124,984.60

=== Results ===
The initial result, seeing Lukes lead by only 105 votes, was narrow enough that a hand-recount was conducted after Rushton requested one. In the end, only 116 votes separated Lukes and Rushton, with Lukes having seen her lead increase by eleven votes in the recount. As of 2019, this was the narrowest margin of victory in a Worcester mayoral election since the city started popularly electing its mayors in 1987.

2007 mayoral election results
Candidate	Votes	%
Konstantina B. Lukes (incumbent)	7,507	36.15%
Frederick C. Rushton	7,391	35.59%
Gary Rosen	4,552	21.92%
William Coleman, III	1,318	6.35%
Total votes	20,768	100

Lukes finished second in the at-large city council election. Rosen finished first, Rushton finished fourth, and Coleman finished twelfth. Rosen, by the rules of the city charter, became the vice-chair of the Worcester City Council.

== 2009 mayoral election ==
2009 Worcester mayoral election
- November 3, 2009
Nominee	Joseph C. O'Brien	Konstantina Lukes	Kate Toomey
Popular vote	10,214	5,663	3,722
Percentage	50.58%	28.04%	18.43%
Mayor before election
Konstantina B. Lukes
Democratic
Elected mayor
Joseph C. O'Brien
Democratic

The 2009 Worcester, Massachusetts mayoral election was held on November 3, 2009. It saw the election of Joseph C. O'Brien, who unseated incumbent mayor Konstantina B. Lukes.

As of 2019, this is the only time an incumbent mayor has lost reelection in a Worcester mayoral election since they started popularly electing mayors in 1987. As of 2019, it is the only instance in which an incumbent Worcester mayor has lost such an election.

O'Brien was the first mayor to be elected without having first served on the Worcester City Council.

=== Candidates ===
- Konstantina Lukes, incumbent mayor since 2007, Worcester City Council at-large member since 1990
- Joseph C. O'Brien, former School Committee member (2002–2008)
- Kate Toomey, Worcester City Council at-large member since 2006
- Emanuel Tsitsilianos

=== Campaign ===
While there was speculation that Frederick C. Rushton, who had lost the 2007 to Lukes by an immensely narrow margin, might challenge her again in 2009, he ruled it out in February 2009.

The election race was slow to start.

Lukes, as she did in the previous election, saw two strong challengers, the two this time being O'Brien and Toomey.

O'Brien's candidacy was supported by lieutenant governor and former Worcester mayor Tim Murray. O'Brien was also supported by congressman Jim McGovern, for whom he served as district director (O'Brien took a leave from this role during his mayoral campaign). Many other local Democrats threw their support behind O'Brien. O'Brien also received the support of several employee unions.

Toomey was endorsed by the Worcester County Sheriff and one of the city's two state senators.

The election focused more on the leadership and personality of Lukes than it did on particular issues.

O'Brien and Toomey criticized Lukes for being to inactive a mayor, and argued that she was ineffective at advocating for the city at the state and federal level. Lukes refuted accusations that she was too inactive, arguing that the role of mayor was not intended to be a full-time position.

Lukes argued that she had independence from what she claimed was a Murray-McGovern run political machine.

Lukes argued that O'Brien was simply seeking to use the office of mayor as a platform to seek higher office, and argued that she herself was free from such ambitions.

O'Brien pledged to commit attention to inner-city neighborhoods, and called attention to the fact that he resided in the less-affluent Main South area of the city.

O'Brien aimed to run a movement-style campaign, seeking small online donations and utilizing the internet to organize campaign events.

Lukes raised $33,895 for her campaign. Lukes collected mainly small donations, and solicited her donations primarily by mail. Financially, Lukes ran a low-cost campaign, even using her private law-office to house her campaign headquarters.

O'Brien raised $43,300 for his campaign. O'Brien was additionally supported by the grassroots group Neighbor to Neighbor, which funded $6,000 in mailers for his campaign.

Toomey raised $33,633 for her campaign.

Tsitsilianos did not raise any money for his campaign, and received little attention. However, he did participate in the mayoral debates.

In an interview shortly after losing the election, Lukes would blame the "pro-retire, pro-union" vote for her loss. She would also claim to have been hurt by low turnout, which she claimed O'Brien was able to capitalize on with his campaign's organization efforts. She would also characterize the campaign against her as "very negative...right up until the end".

=== Results ===
2009 mayoral election results
Candidate	Votes	%
Joseph C. O'Brien	10,214	50.58%
Konstantina B. Lukes (incumbent)	5,663	28.04%
Kate Toomey	3,722	18.43%
E. Tsitsilianos	595	2.95%
Total votes	20,197	

O'Brien also finished first in the at-large city council election. Toomey finished second, Lukes finished fifth, Tsitsilianos finished eleventh. Lukes, by the rules of the city charter, became the vice-chair of the Worcester City Council.

O'Brien was the only non-incumbent individual elected to a citywide office in Worcester that year.

== 2011 mayoral election ==
2011 Worcester mayoral election
- November 8, 2011
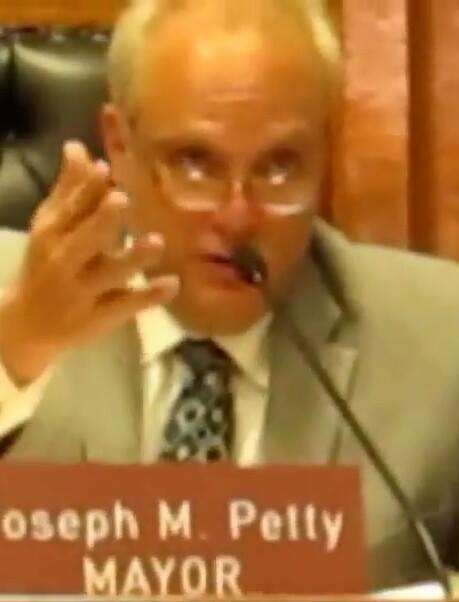

Nominee	Joseph Petty	Konstantina Lukes
Popular vote	9,008	6,708
Percentage	48.35%	36.01%
Nominee	Carmen Carmona	Bill Coleman
Popular vote	1,531	1,382
Percentage	8.22%	7.42%
Mayor before election
Joseph C. O'Brien
Democratic
Elected mayor
Joseph Petty
Democratic

The 2011 Worcester, Massachusetts mayoral election was held on November 8, 2011. It saw the election of Joseph Petty.

On September 16, 2011, incumbent mayor Joseph C. O'Brien announced that he would no longer be seeking reelection, citing family concerns.

=== Candidates ===
- Bill Coleman, candidate for mayor in 1991, 1995, 2001, 2003, and 2005, and 2007
- Carmen L. Carmona, case worker at Community Healthlink Inc.
- Konstantina Lukes, former mayor (2007–2010), Worcester City Council at-large member since 1990
- Joseph Petty, member of Worcester City Council since 1998

=== Results ===
2011 mayoral election results
Candidate	Votes	%
Joseph M. Petty	9,008	48.35%
Konstantina B. Lukes	6,708	36.01%
Carmen L. Carmona	1,531	8.22%
Bill Coleman	1,382	7.42%
Total votes	18,629	

Petty also finished first in the at-large city council election. Lukes finished fourth, Carmona finished eleventh, and Coleman finished twelfth. Lukes, by the rules of the city charter, became the vice-chair of the Worcester City Council.

== 2013 mayoral election ==
2013 Worcester mayoral election
- November 5, 2013
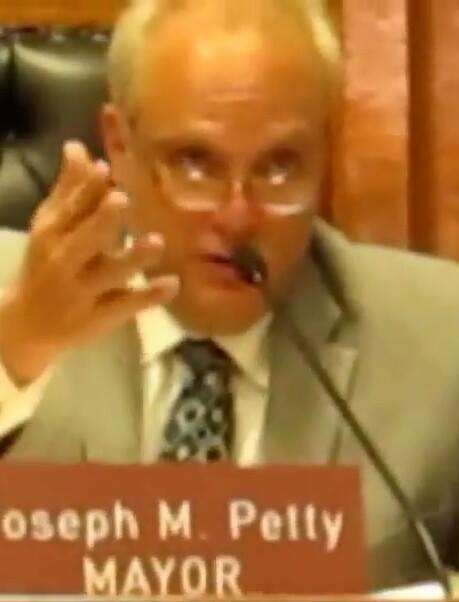

Nominee	Joseph Petty	Konstantina Lukes	Bill Coleman
Popular vote	8,900	4,156	1,325
Percentage	58.28%	27.21%	8.68%
Mayor before election
Joseph Petty
Democratic
Elected mayor
Joseph Petty
Democratic

The 2013 Worcester, Massachusetts mayoral election was held on November 5, 2013. It saw the reelection of incumbent mayor Joseph Petty to a second term.

=== Candidates ===
- Bill Coleman, candidate for mayor in 1991, 1995, 1997, 2001, 2003, 2005, 2007, and 2011
- William Feegbeh
- Konstantina Lukes, former mayor (2007–2010), Worcester City Council at-large member since 1990
- Joseph Petty, incumbent mayor, Worcester City Council member since 1998

=== Results ===
2013 mayoral election results
Candidate	Votes	%
Joseph M. Petty (incumbent)	8,900	58.28
Konstantina B. Lukes	4,156	27.21
Bill Coleman	1,325	8.68
William Feegbeh	302	1.98
Total votes	14,683	

Petty also finished first in the at-large city council election. Lukes finished fourth, Coleman finished eighth, and Feegbeh finished twelfth. Lukes, by the rules of the city charter, became the vice-chair of the Worcester City Council.

== 2015 mayoral election ==
2015 Worcester mayoral election
- November 3, 2015
- Turnout: 20.51%
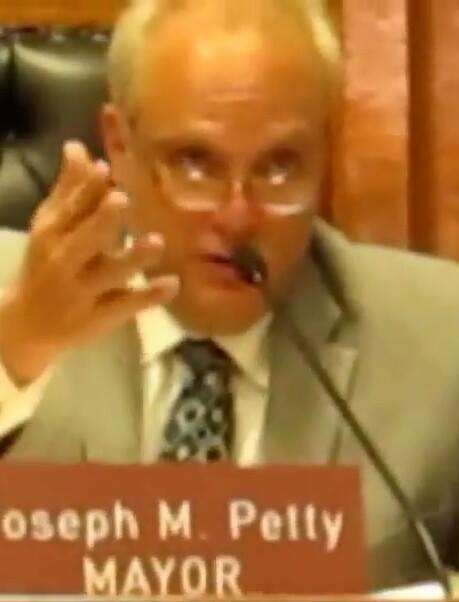

Nominee	Joseph Petty	Michael T. Gaffney	William Coleman
Popular vote	9,978	7,859	1,335
Percentage	52.04%	40.99%	6.96%
Mayor before election
Joseph Petty
Democratic
Elected mayor
Joseph Petty
Democratic

The 2015 Worcester, Massachusetts mayoral election was held on November 3, 2015. It saw the reelection of incumbent mayor Joseph Petty to a third term.

=== Candidates ===
- Michael T. Gaffney
- William S. Coleman, III, candidate for mayor in 1991, 1995, 1997, 2001, 2003, 2005, 2007, 2011, and 2013
- Joseph Petty, incumbent mayor, Worcester City Council member since 1998

=== Results ===
2015 mayoral election results
Candidate	Votes	%
Joseph M. Petty (incumbent)	9,978	52.04
Michael T. Gaffney	7,859	40.99
William S. Coleman III	1,335	6.96
Total votes	19,172	20.51

Petty also finished first in the at-large city council election. Gaffney finished second and Coleman finished eleventh. Gaffney, by the rules of the city charter, became the vice-chair of the Worcester City Council.

== 2017 mayoral election ==
2017 Worcester mayoral election
- November 7, 2017
- Turnout: 14.74%
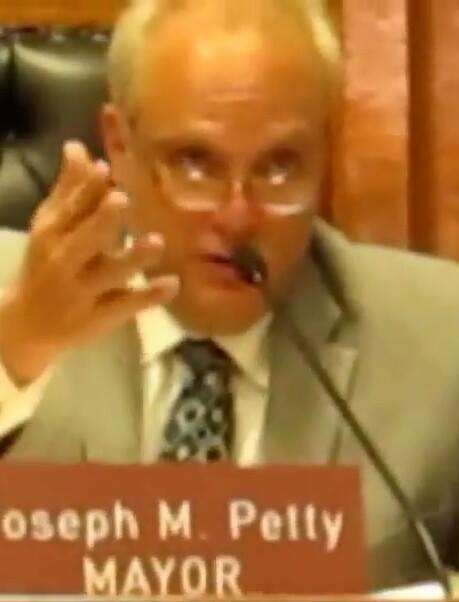

Nominee	Joseph Petty	Konstantina Lukes
Popular vote	11,119	4,640
Percentage	70.56%	29.44%
Mayor before election
Joseph Petty
Democratic
Elected mayor
Joseph Petty
Democratic

The 2017 Worcester, Massachusetts mayoral election was held on November 7, 2017. It saw the reelection of incumbent mayor Joseph Petty to a fourth term.

=== Candidates ===
- Konstantina Lukes, former mayor (from 2007 to 2010), Worcester City Council at-large member since 1990
- Joseph Petty, incumbent mayor, Worcester City Council member since 1998

=== Results ===
2017 mayoral election results
Candidate	Votes	%
Joseph M. Petty (incumbent)	11,119	70.56
Konstantina B. Lukes	4,640	29.44
Total votes	15,759	14.74

Petty also finished first in the at-large city council election. Lukes finished sixth. Lukes, by the rules of the city charter, became the vice-chair of the Worcester City Council.

== 2019 mayoral election ==
2019 Worcester mayoral election
- November 5, 2019
- Turnout: 16.56%
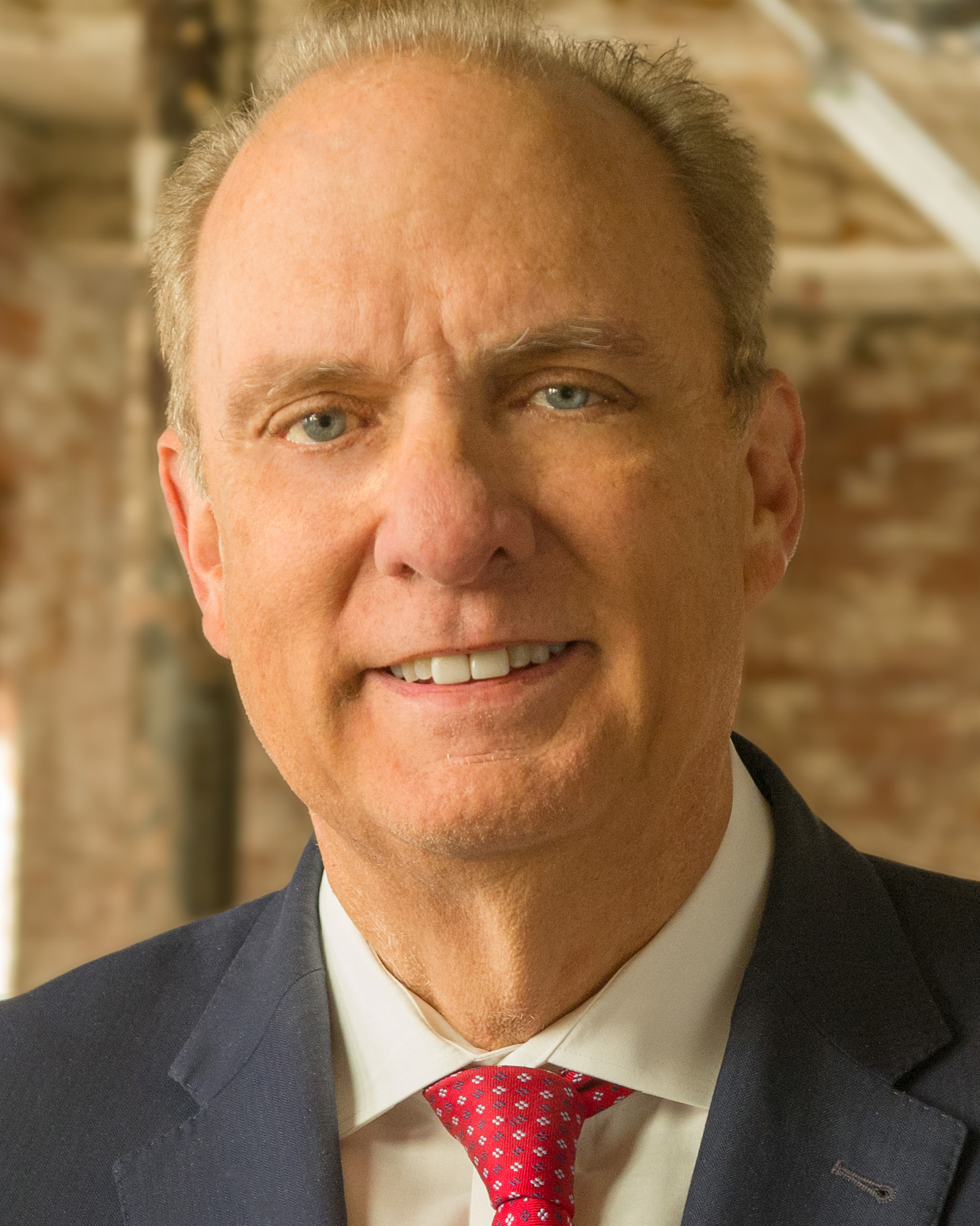

Nominee	Joseph Petty	Donna M. Colorio
Popular vote	10,194	3,840
Percentage	60.55%	22.81%
Nominee	Bill Coleman	Owurakwaku Poku Sarkodieh
Popular vote	1,439	1,363
Percentage	8.55%	8.10%
Mayor before election
Joseph Petty
Democratic
Elected mayor
Joseph Petty
Democratic

The 2019 Worcester, Massachusetts mayoral election was held on November 5, 2019. It saw the reelection of incumbent mayor Joseph Petty. Petty became the first-ever mayor in the history of Worcester to receive a fifth two-year term as mayor.

=== Candidates ===
- Bill Coleman, community activist, candidate for mayor in 1991, 1995, 2001, 2003, 2005, 2007, 2011, 2013, and 2015
- Donna M. Colorio, member of the Worcester School Committee and former chair of the Worcester Republican City Committee
- Joseph Petty, incumbent mayor, Worcester City Council member since 1998
- Owurakwaku Poku Sarkodieh

=== Campaign ===
The election was a four-person race.

Petty's prime challenger was Colorio, the former chair of the Worcester Republican City Committee and two-term member of the Worcester School Committee. Colorio was supported by the Republican Super PAC Massachusetts Majority Independent Expenditure PAC (MMIE PAC).

=== Results ===
2019 mayoral election results
Candidate	Votes	%
Joseph M. Petty (incumbent)	10,194	60.55
Donna M. Colorio	3,840	22.81
Bill Coleman	1,439	8.55
Owurakwaku Poku Sarkodieh	1,363	8.10
Total votes	16,836	16.56

Petty also finished first in the at-large city council election. Toomey placed second, Colorio paced sixth, Coleman placed ninth, and Sarkodieh placed tenth. Colorio, by the rules of the city charter, became the vice-chair of the Worcester City Council.

== 2021 mayoral election ==
2021 Worcester mayoral election
- November 2, 2021
- Turnout: 15.94%
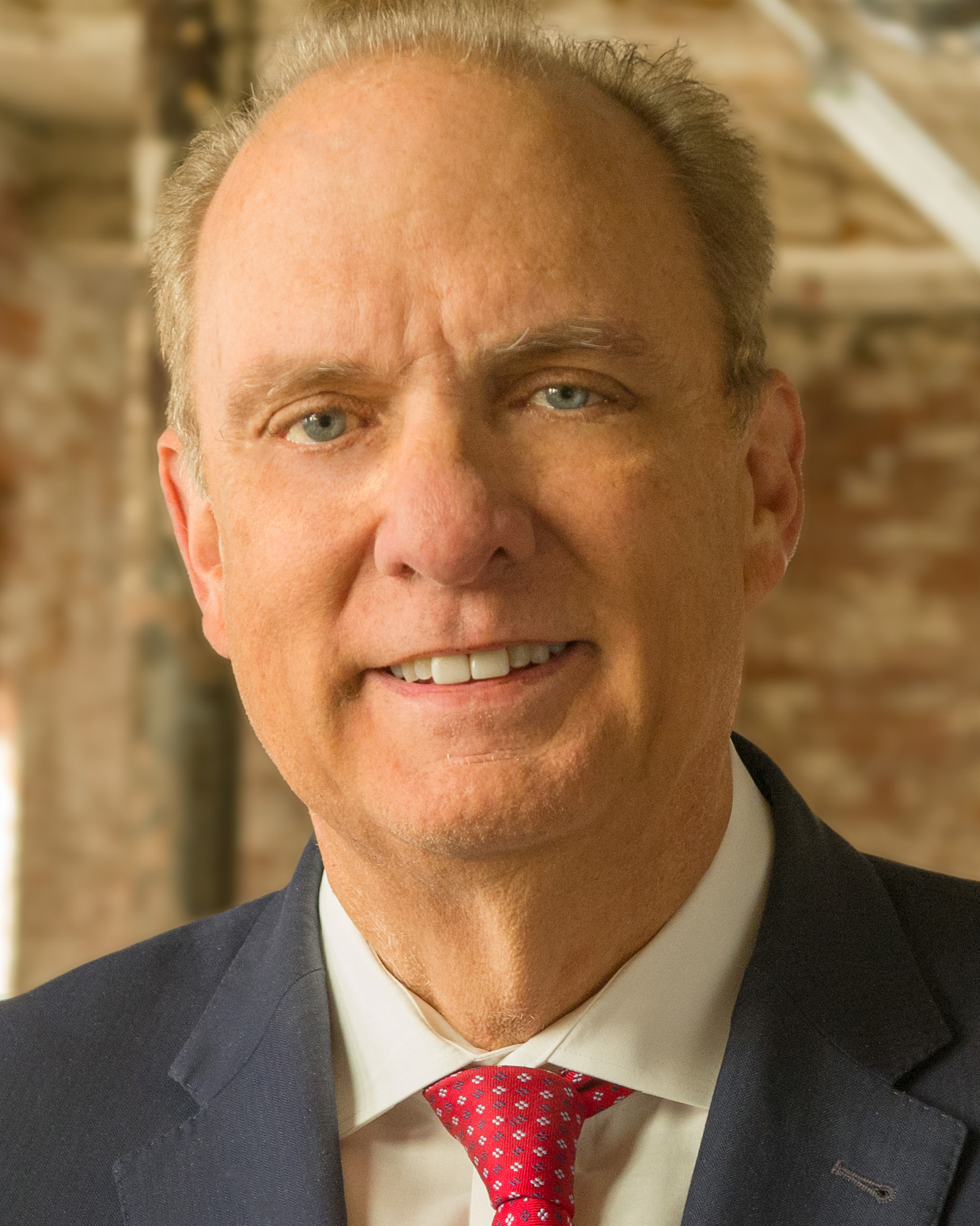

Nominee	Joseph Petty	Donna M. Colorio
Popular vote	10,087	4,150
Percentage	60.48%	24.88%
Nominee	Bill Coleman	Peter A. Stefan
Popular vote	1,509	931
Percentage	9.05%	5.58%
Mayor before election
Joseph Petty
Democratic
Elected mayor
Joseph Petty
Democratic

The 2021 Worcester, Massachusetts mayoral election was held on November 2, 2021. It saw the reelection of incumbent mayor Joseph Petty to a record sixth term.

=== Candidates ===
- Bill Coleman, community activist and perennial candidate (candidate for mayor in 1991, 1995, 2001, 2003, 2005, 2007, 2011, 2013, 2015, and 2019)
- Donna Colorio, vice chair of the Worcester City Council and mayoral candidate in 2019
- Joseph Petty, incumbent mayor and Worcester City Council member since 1998
- Peter Stefan, funeral director

=== Results ===
2021 mayoral election results
Candidate	Votes	%
Joseph M. Petty (incumbent)	10,087	60.48
Donna M. Colorio	4,150	24.88
Bill Coleman	1,509	9.05
Peter A. Stefan	931	5.58
Total votes	16,677	15.94

Petty also finished first in the at-large city council election. Colorio paced sixth, Coleman placed eighth, and Stefan placed tenth. Colorio, by the rules of the city charter, became the vice-chair of the Worcester City Council.

== 2023 mayoral election ==
2023 Worcester mayoral election
- November 7, 2023
- Turnout: 19.14%
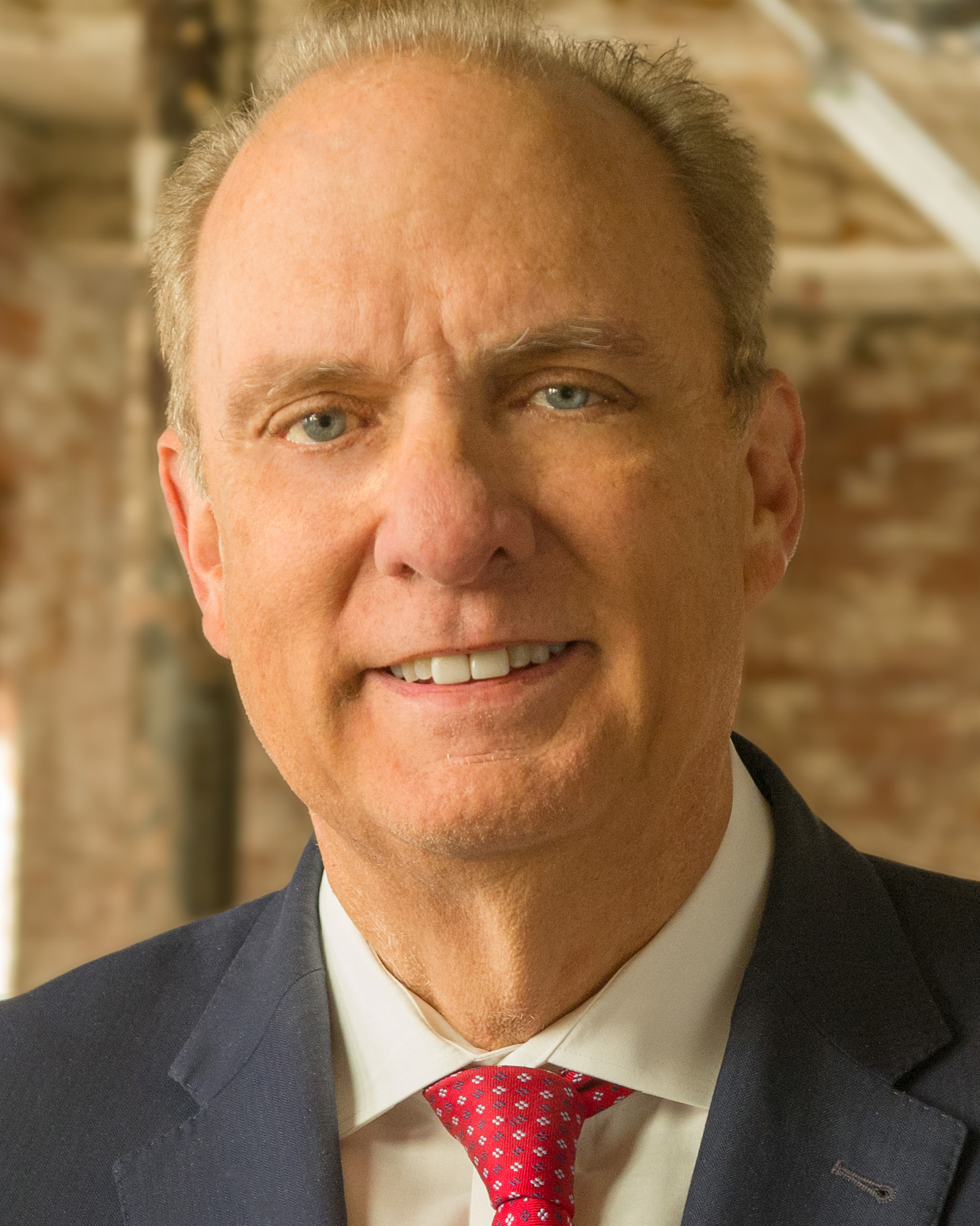

Nominee	Joseph Petty	Khrystian King	Donna Colorio
Popular vote	10,687	5,877	2,912
Percentage	49.86%	27.42%	13.59%
- Precinct Results Petty: 30–40% 40–50% 50–60% 60–70% King: 30–40% 40–50% Tie
Mayor before election
Joseph Petty
Democratic
Elected mayor
Joseph Petty
Democratic

The 2023 Worcester, Massachusetts mayoral election was held November 7, 2023. Incumbent mayor Joseph Petty won re-election to a seventh term in office.

=== Candidates ===
- Bill Coleman, community activist and perennial candidate
- Donna Colorio, vice chair of the Worcester City Council and candidate for mayor in 2019 and 2021
- Guillermo Creamer Jr., former chair of the Worcester Human Rights Commission
- Khrystian King, at-large city councilor
- Joseph Petty, incumbent mayor

=== Endorsements ===
Guillermo Creamer Jr.

Political parties

- Working Families Party (co-endorsement with King)
Khrystian King

Political parties

- Working Families Party (co-endorsement with Creamer)

=== Results ===
- 2023 mayoral election results
  Candidate	Votes	%
  Joseph M. Petty (incumbent)	10,087	49.86
  Khrystian E. King	5,877	27.42
  Donna M. Colorio	2,912	13.59
  Bill Coleman	1,009	4.71
  Guillermo Creamer, Jr.	950	4.43
  Total votes	20,835	19.14

Petty finished first in the simultaneous election for Worcester's six at-large city council seats, while King placed third, Colorio placed fourth, Creamer placed seventh, and Coleman placed tenth. Petty, King, and Colorio thus held their city council seats, with Creamer narrowly missing out on a seat by a margin of 1.9%. As the mayoral runner-up, King automatically became vice chair of the city council, taking over from Colorio, who won the position in the 2021 election.

== 2025 mayoral election ==
2025 Worcester mayoral election
- November 4, 2025
Mayor before election
Joseph Petty
Democratic
Elected mayor
Joseph Petty

The 2025 Worcester, Massachusetts mayoral election was held on November 4th, 2025 with Mayor Joseph Petty winning a 8th term .

=== Candidates ===
- Joseph Petty, incumbent mayor
- Khrystian King, city council vice chair and runner-up in the 2023 mayoral election
- Owura Sarkodieh, real estate agent
- Edson Montero, Activist

== See also ==
- List of mayors and city managers of Worcester, Massachusetts
