= Joseph C. O'Brien =

American politician

Mayor of Worcester, Massachusetts
- In office January 4, 2010 – January 2, 2012
- Preceded by: Konstantina Lukes
- Succeeded by: Joseph Petty

At-large member of the Worcester City Council
- In office January 4, 2010 – January 2, 2012

Personal details
- Born: November 25, 1965 (age 60) Worcester, Massachusetts, U.S.
- Party: Democratic
- Spouse: Lisa Laurel Weinberg
- Profession: Community Organizer

Joseph C. O'Brien (born November 25, 1965) is an American politician, community organiser and labor leader. He previously served as an at-large member of the Worcester, Massachusetts City Council and served as Mayor of Worcester, Massachusetts from 2010 to 2012.

== Early life and education ==
O'Brien was born in Montreal Canada and raised in Worcester, Massachusetts where he attended Doherty High School. At Doherty, he played varsity sports and was active in student government. In his senior year he served as the Chairperson of the City Managers Youth Council and in this role he advocated for youth voting and changes to the city charter that would create a majority minority City Council district. He earned a B.A. in urban studies from Fordham University where he was a leader in the school's community service programs and was part of a group of students that staffed a local soup kitchen. He also discovered rugby, started for four years on the school team and then continued playing for two decades. He took a leave from school his Junior year to live and teach at an orphanage in Tecate, Mexico and in his senior year received national recognition for his work there and in the Bronx community.

== Professional career ==
After graduating from college, O'Brien worked for three years as a community organizer in the South Bronx for the Northwest Bronx Community Clergy Coalition. In 1992 moved to San Diego to help his former college roommate Juan Vargas run for Congress. Returning to Worcester in 1993, he went to work for the Greater Worcester YMCA as the Director of Community Programs and then became Field Director for then-State Representative Kevin O'Sullivan's bid for Congress. In 1996, he became an EMS Paramedic and over the next 20 years worked part-time as a paramedic in the Blackstone Valley area of Massachusetts. He spent the next four years working for environmental and HIV/Aids organizations in Central Massachusetts and as a writer for the Worcester Phoenix. After spending a year earning his MPA in 2000 at Harvard University Kennedy School of Government, O'Brien was elected to the Worcester School Committee. He served on the school committee for three two-year terms and led efforts to improve programs for at-risk students and to expand student health services. From 2003-2004 O'Brien worked as the Executive Director of the Mass Voters For Clean Elections and then as Director of the Commonwealth Coalition. In this capacity, he helped elect progressive candidates, promote public financing for campaigns, and helped defend the state's court decision to make same-sex marriage in Massachusetts legal. In 2006 he served as Campaign Manager for then Worcester Mayor Tim Murray's successful campaign for Massachusetts Lieutenant Governor. From 2007-2009, O'Brien worked as District Director for U.S. Congressman Jim McGovern. In this role he helped support the growth of the city and region and he took a leave from this position in 2008 to serve as NW New Hampshire GOTV Director for the presidential campaigns of candidatesHillary Clinton in the primary and then for Barack Obama in the general election.

O'Brien launched a campaign for Mayor of Worcester in 2009. He faced off against incumbent Konstantina Lukes and City Councilor Kathleen Toomey. His campaign received support from Massachusetts Lieutenant Governor Tim Murray, unions and community leaders. On November 3, 2009, O'Brien won the mayoral election with 50% of the vote and won all 50 of the city's precincts.

As Mayor, O’Brien initiated and led a special Mayor's Task Force on Job Growth and Retention that created a comprehensive strategic plan for economic growth in the city. He also created the Mayor's Civic Academy to teach civic participation to community leaders and this model program has been continued by current Mayor Joe Petty. As Chair of the Worcester School Committee he spearheaded a comprehensive effort to address the capital needs of the city’s public schools that resulted in more than 13 million dollars of funding for school renovation and technology upgrades. He also created the Mayor’s Task Force on Latino Student Excellence to address the growing achievement gap for Latino students. To better support the city's growing immigrant population he helped launch the Mayor's Immigrant and Refugee Roundtable.

O'Brien aroused controversy by spearheading a boycott of Arizona due to its law regarding illegal immigration, Arizona SB 1070. He also supported a resolution made by the U.S. Conference of Mayors that called for the United States to end gun violence and to pull its troops out of Afghanistan. O'Brien took stances on taxes, such as supporting shifting taxes from businesses to homeowners and raising the state income tax, that generated opposition.

O'Brien announced on September 16, 2011 that he would not seek reelection as Mayor after he and his wife adopted two young children from Ethiopia. O'Brien then served for one term in an at-large seat on the City Council. He also returned to working for Congressman Jim McGovern as his political and finance director.

Returning to work in issue advocacy, in 2016 O'Brien went to work as Executive Director of the Environmental League of Massachusetts Action Fund (ELM Action Fund) where he led efforts to pass laws that protected the state's environmental legacy and worked to build the political power of the environmental community. Joe also began teaching as an adjunct professor at Clark University in Worcester and helped launch the school's Senior Leadership MPA Program in 2019. Joe was hired in late 2019 as the Political and Legislative Director for the North Atlantic States Regional Council of Carpenters where he coordinates local, state and federal political and legislative work for the union 34,000 members in New England and New York.

== Personal life ==
O'Brien lived for 20 years in the Worcesters Main 'South neighborhood where he led community programs and projects. He is married to Lisa Laurel Weinberg, a human rights attorney and they have two children. He currently serves on the board of several community-based organisations and is an active volunteer in the city.

Political offices
Preceded by Konstantina Lukes	Mayor of Worcester, Massachusetts; January 10, 2007-January 2, 2010	Succeeded by Joseph Petty
