= Phinehas Ball =

American politician

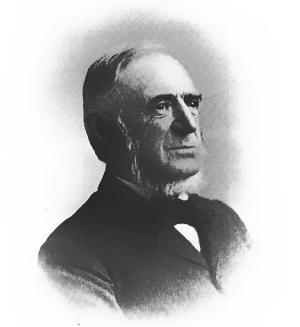

14th Mayor of Worcester, Massachusetts
- In office 1865–1865
- Preceded by: Daniel Waldo Lincoln
- Succeeded by: James B. Blake

Personal details
- Born: January 18, 1824 Boylston, Massachusetts
- Died: December 19, 1894 (aged 70) Worcester, Massachusetts
- Spouse(s): Sarah Augusta Holyoke (m. 1848) Mary Jane Otis (m. 1865)
- Children: 2
- Education: Brown University

Phinehas Ball (January 18, 1824 – December 19, 1894) was an American politician who served as the mayor of Worcester, Massachusetts in 1865.

== Early life ==
Ball was born on January 18, 1824, in Boylston, Massachusetts.

== Family life ==
In 1848 Ball married Sarah Augusta Holyoke.
