= Joseph Petty =

American politician

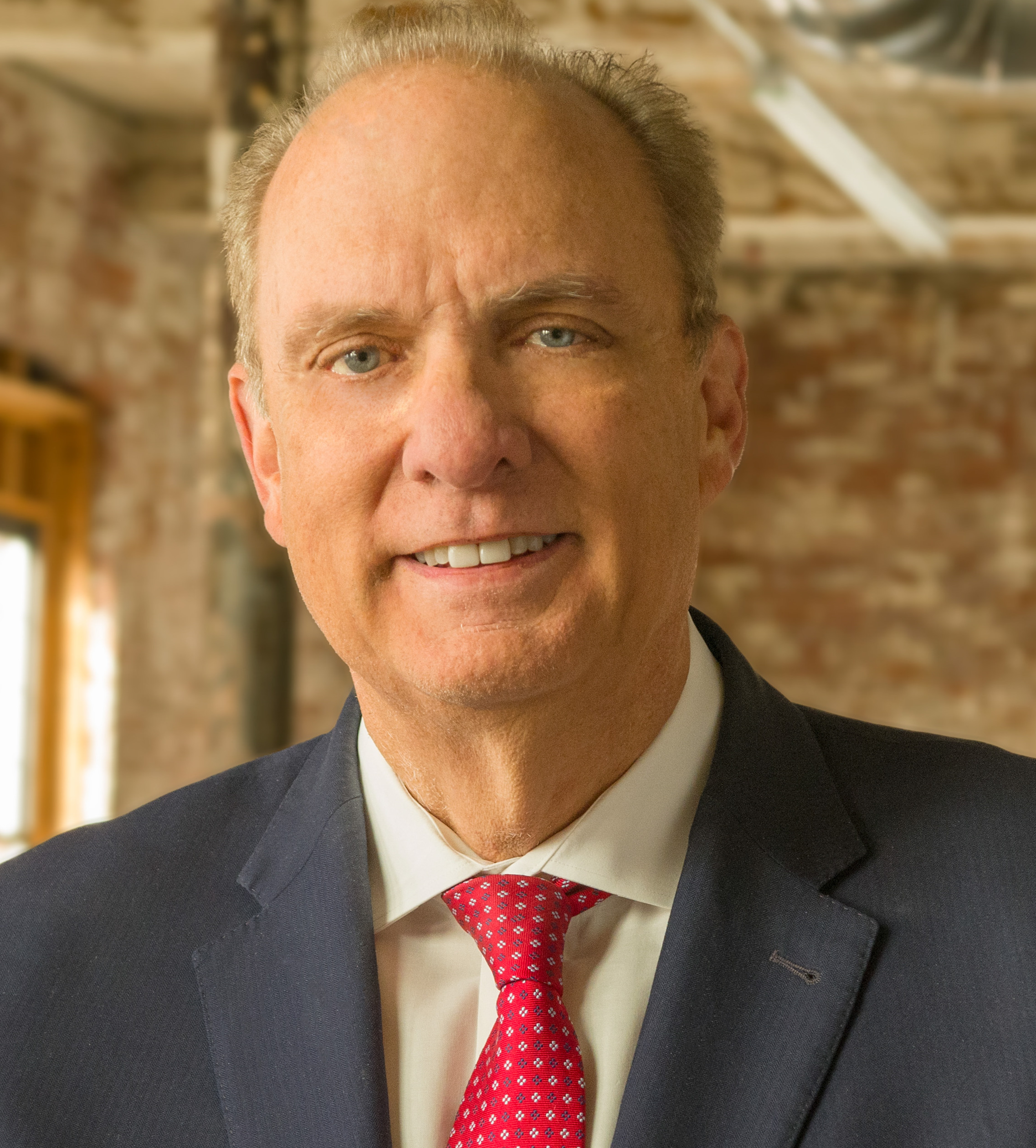
- Petty in 2022

Mayor of Worcester
- Incumbent
- Assumed office January 2, 2012
- Preceded by: Joseph C. O'Brien

Member of the Worcester City Council
- Incumbent
- Assumed office 1998

Personal details
- Party: Democratic
- Spouse: Gayle Perrone
- Children: 3
- Education: Nichols College; New England Law
- Profession: Attorney

Joseph M. Petty is an American attorney, politician and the current mayor of Worcester, Massachusetts.

== Early life and education ==
Raised in Worcester, Petty graduated from Holy Name Central Catholic High School. He attended Nichols College and earned a Juris Doctor degree from New England School of Law.

== Political career ==
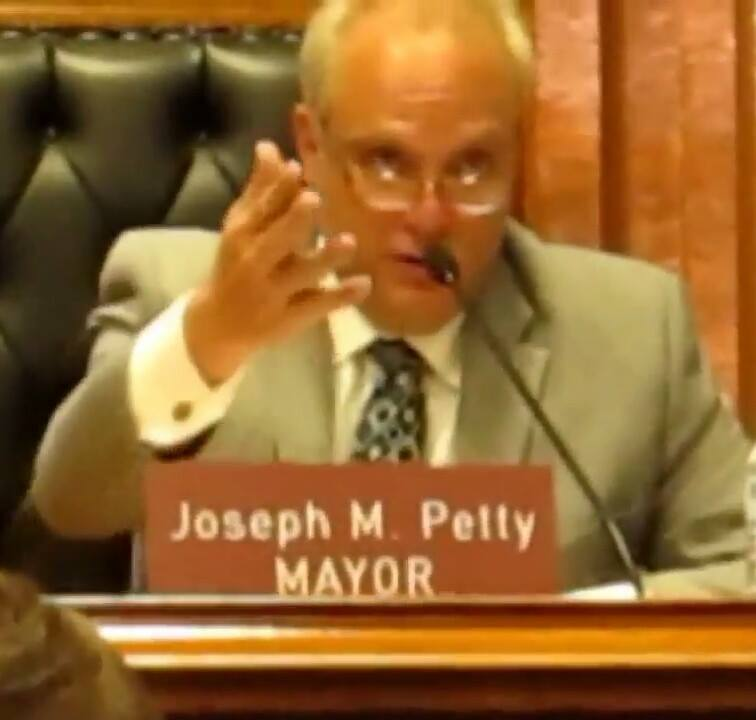
Petty in 2014

Petty was first elected to the Worcester City Council in 1997. After serving six two-year terms on the council, he mounted a campaign for mayor in 2011 when incumbent Joseph C. O'Brien decided not to seek reelection due to family concerns. He defeated former mayor Konstantina Lukes, perennial candidate Bill Coleman, and Carmen Carmona by earning 48% of votes cast. During the preceding campaign, Petty received the endorsement of Congressman Jim McGovern.

As mayor, Petty has overseen the partial demolition and redevelopment of Worcester Common Outlets, an abandoned downtown mall. This effort involves recreating a direct roadway between Union Station and Worcester City Hall and Common that was lost when the mall was built in the 1960s.

In May 2012, Petty brokered a tax reform compromise among city councilors. Some councilors favored a sharp decrease in the city's commercial tax rate, while others wished to maintain the lowest possible residential tax rate. Petty proposed a comprise that decreased the commercial tax rate by $5.57 and raised the residential tax rate ¢92 per $1000 of assessed value. This tax reform, which passed on a 6–5 vote, was the subject of controversy, for it came in the wake of a revelation that annual property revaluations would lead to significantly higher commercial tax bills. While the city's assessors contended that the increased tax bills were due to reforms, such as considering a building's exact vacancy rate when calculating its assessment, other figures accused past administrations of improperly overriding assessments to provide lower tax bills. He was reelected to a second term in 2013. He was reelected to a third term in 2015.

In early 2017, Petty apologized after he was caught on tape making disparaging remarks about people protesting a city council proposal. Earlier in the evening, he had thanked the protestors, saying they made Worcester proud.

He was reelected to a fourth term in 2017. In 2019, Petty was reelected to a fifth term. This made him the first-ever mayor in the history of Worcester to receive a fifth two-year term as mayor. In 2021, Petty won a sixth term as mayor and thirteenth term as a city councilor.

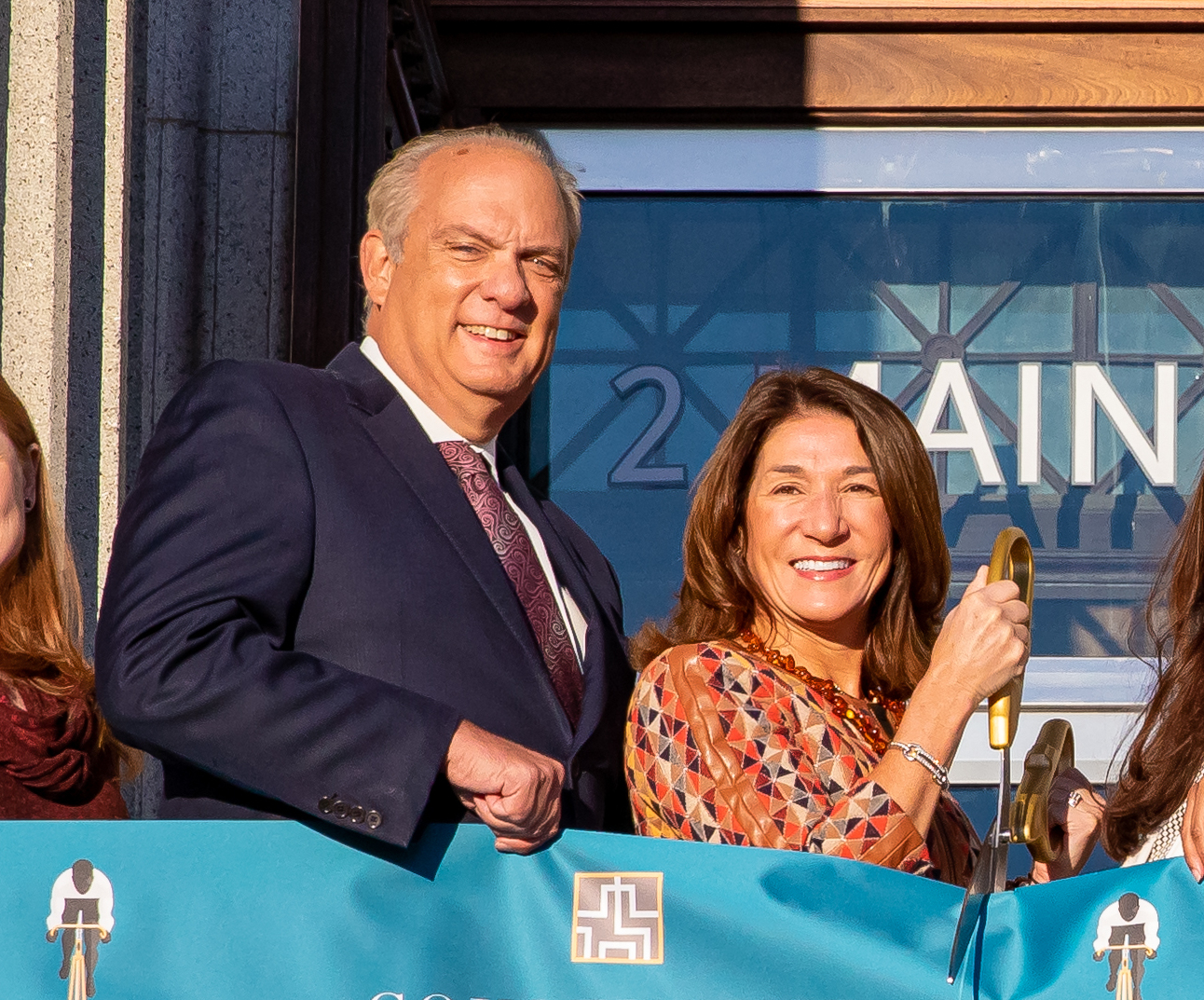
Petty and Lieutenant Governor Karyn Polito in 2021

During the 2020 Democratic Party presidential primaries, he gave his endorsement to Elizabeth Warren's candidacy.

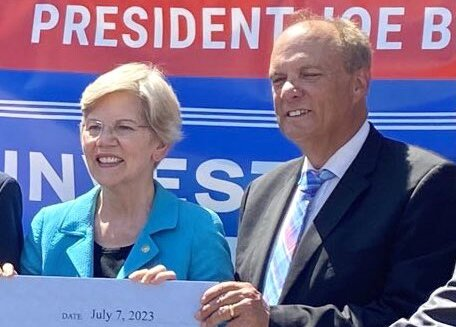
Petty at an event with U.S. Senator Elizabeth Warren in 2023

On February 22, 2022, Petty filed to run for Massachusetts Senate's 1st Worcester district. He had previously been floated as a potential candidate following incumbent Harriette L. Chandler's decision to retire. He officially announced his candidacy for the seat on March 9. He was defeated in the September 6 Democratic primary by Robyn Kennedy.

Petty opposes the initiative to enact the country's strictest rent control policy at the 2026 Massachusetts elections, saying it would be "catastrophic to local municipal budgets."

== Personal life ==
Petty is married to his wife Gayle Perrone and they have three children.

Political offices
Preceded by Joseph C. O'Brien	Mayor of Worcester, Massachusetts; January 2, 2011 - present	Succeeded by Incumbent
