= WSRS =

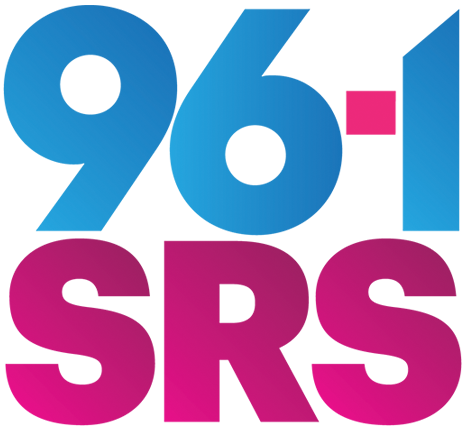
- Worcester, Massachusetts; United States
- Broadcast area: Central Massachusetts
- Frequency: 96.1 MHz (HD Radio)
- Branding: 96-1 SRS

Programming
- Format: Adult contemporary
- Subchannels: HD2: WTAG simulcast (news/talk)
- Affiliations: Premiere Networks

Ownership
- Owner: iHeartMedia; (iHM Licenses, LLC)
- Sister stations: WTAG

History
- First air date: June 17, 1940
- Former call signs: W1XTG (1940–1944); WTAG-FM (1944–1963)
- Former frequencies: 43.4 MHz (1940–1944); 46.1 MHz (1944–1946); 102.7 MHz (1946–1947)
- Call sign meaning: "Worcester's Stereo Radio Station"

Technical information
- Licensing authority: FCC
- Facility ID: 35225
- Class: B
- ERP: 16,500 watts
- HAAT: 263 meters (863 ft)
- Transmitter coordinates: 42.310°N 71.903°W

Links
- Public license information: Public file; LMS
- Webcast: Listen live (via iHeartRadio)
- Website: 961srs.iheart.com

WSRS (96.1 FM) – branded 96-1 SRS – is a commercial radio station licensed to Worcester, Massachusetts, and serving Central Massachusetts. Owned by iHeartMedia, Inc., the transmitter site and studios are located in the Worcester suburb of Paxton. WSRS broadcasts an adult contemporary format, switching to Christmas music for much of November and December. The station is the local network affiliate for the Delilah and Ellen K programs.

Besides a standard analog transmission, WSRS broadcasts over two HD Radio channels, and streams online via iHeartRadio.

== History ==
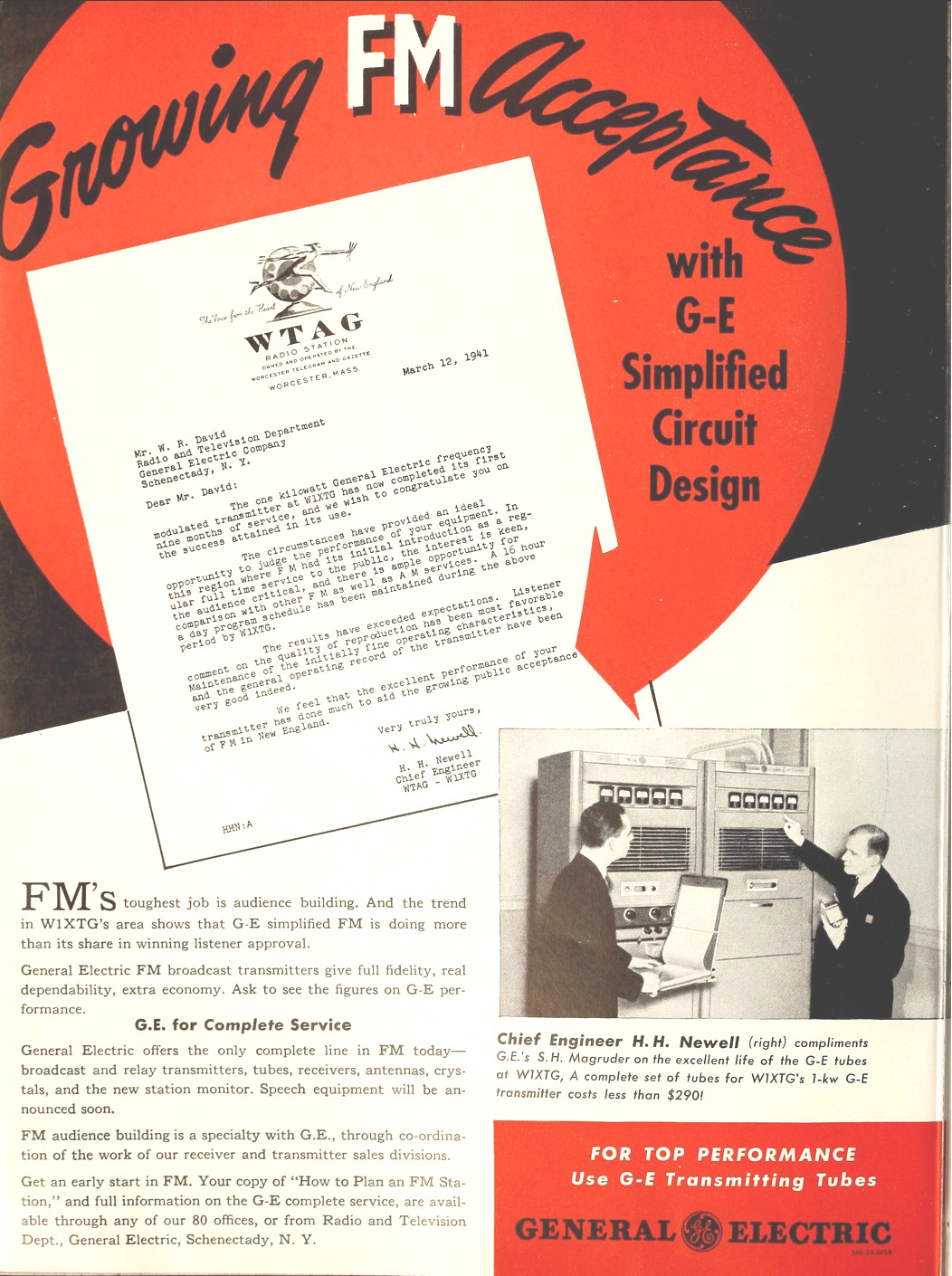
1941 General Electric advertisement featuring W1XTG facilities.

WSRS debuted, as experimental FM station W1XTG, on June 17, 1940, at 43.4 MHz. It was owned by the Worcester Telegram & Gazette, which also owned AM station WTAG in Worcester, and W1XTG's initial schedule duplicated WTAG from 6:30 a.m. to midnight. W1XTG's transmitter was originally co-located at WTAG's transmitter site in Holden, Massachusetts, later moving to Mount Asnebumskit in Paxton.

In May 1940, the Federal Communications Commission (FCC) had announced the establishment, effective January 1, 1941, of an FM band operating on 40 channels spanning 42–50 MHz. The Worcester Telegram Publishing Company filed an application for commercial operation in August, originally for 43.1 MHz, which was modified to 46.1 MHz the following June. However, there was a delay in receiving an authorization, after the FCC began an investigation whether newspaper ownership of radio stations should be restricted. Meanwhile, operations continued on 43.4 MHz under the experimental W1XTG authorization. The station's continued schedule of 6:30 a.m. to midnight was "claimed to be the longest FM schedule in the country".

At this time FM was still a new, unproven technology. The station owners put on a series of promotional demonstrations, in conjunction with receiver manufacturers General Electric, Stromberg-Carlson, and Zenith. The outbreak of World War II resulted in a shortage of available male employees, and W1XTG began to promote the fact that it was now operating with an all-female staff. W1XTG's schedule in early 1944 was listed as 8 to 10 p.m. daily, plus 8 to 11 a.m. and 3:00 to 5:30 p.m. on weekdays, and 1 to 5 p.m. on weekends.

In late 1943, although the FCC's newspaper cross-ownership review was still ongoing, the 1940 application for commercial operation was provisionally approved. Additionally, a waiver was issued to allow the construction to precede, despite a general wartime restriction on most station upgrades. On January 30, 1944, the station's call sign was changed to WTAG-FM, and its frequency assignment to 46.1 MHz.

The FCC later reassigned the original FM band frequencies to other services, and ordered existing stations to move to a new band from 88 to 106 MHz, which was later expanded to 88–108 MHz. During a transition period from the original FM "low band" to the new "high band", some stations for a time broadcast simultaneously on both their old and new frequencies. In 1946, WTAG-FM was authorized to broadcast on 102.7 MHz, which was changed the next year to 96.1 MHz.

WTAG-FM joined the WQXR Network on July 19, 1959, carrying 65 hours a week of its programming. The station began a separate beautiful music format around 1960, playing mostly instrumental cover versions of popular songs, along with Hollywood and Broadway show tunes in quarter-hour sweeps. It also would play an occasional vocal selection (often sung by a chorus).

Knight Quality Stations purchased WTAG-FM from the Telegram & Gazette for $50,000 in 1963; the sale separated the station from WTAG, but brought it into common ownership with WEIM in Fitchburg and several New Hampshire stations. As the newspaper retained ownership of WTAG, Knight was required to change WTAG-FM's call sign. With the recent advent of FM stereo broadcasting, the station took the call letters WSRS, for "Worcester's Stereo Radio Station", concurrent with the sale's completion on December 30, 1963. In 1987, Knight would sell WEIM and purchase WTAG from the Telegram & Gazette.

WSRS continued to offer an instrumental based easy listening format well into the 1980s, when it began mixing softer pop songs into the format. By 1982, the station was playing one vocalist per quarter-hour. Half were adult contemporary/baby boomer artists, and the rest were adult standards singers. By 1984, the station was about half vocal and half instrumental. In 1985, WSRS evolved into more of a vocal-based easy listening format with the instrumentals eliminated, except for hits such as "Music Box Dancer", "Chariots of Fire", "Rise" and "Theme from A Summer Place".

In 1986, WSRS cut back on standards artists and evolved into more of a soft adult contemporary sound. By 1989, more uptempo artists were heard, along with Motown and other pop 1960s hits. The DJs also began adding more personality to their presentations. WSRS still played almost no current music.

By 1994, WSRS had made the transition to a mainstream adult contemporary station. In 1997, WSRS and WTAG, along with Knight Quality's other New England stations, were sold to Capstar Broadcasting Partners; upon assuming control in January 1998, the stations were operated by Capstar's Atlantic Star Communications subsidiary. In 1999, as a result of a merger with Chancellor Media (Hicks, Muse, Tate & Furst was a major shareholder in both Capstar and Chancellor), AMFM Inc. became the owner of WTAG and WSRS. Clear Channel Communications assumed ownership of the station in a 2000 merger with AMFM. In 2014, Clear Channel was renamed iHeartMedia, Inc.

Starting in the early 2000s, WSRS switched to all-Christmas music every mid-November, lasting until Christmas Day. After Christmas 2015, the station re-branded from "96.1 WSRS" to "96-1 SRS" (no longer saying the decimal point or the W).

== HD Radio ==
In 2004, WSRS began broadcasting in the HD Radio hybrid format, simulcasting the analog audio on its HD1 subchannel. In 2007, it added "Pride Radio", a Clear Channel-produced dance music service aimed at the LGBTQ community, to the WSRS-HD2 subchannel. In 2009, Pride Radio was temporarily replaced by a classic hits format for a couple of months, then returned for a while. In the early 2010s, the HD2 subchannel began carrying a 1980s classic hits sound; by 2025, it became a simulcast of WTAG.

Pride Radio is now heard on the HD2 subchannel of co-owned WBWL in Boston.
