= James B. Blake =

American politician

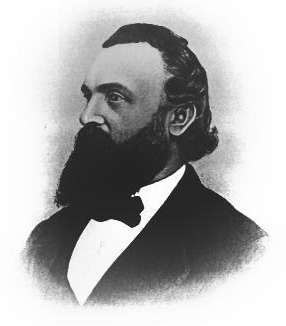

15th Mayor of Worcester, Massachusetts
- In office January 1, 1866 – December 18, 1870
- Preceded by: Phinehas Ball
- Succeeded by: Henry Chapin

Personal details
- Born: June 19, 1827 Boston, Massachusetts
- Died: December 18, 1870 (aged 43) Worcester, Massachusetts
- Resting place: Rural Cemetery; Worcester, Massachusetts

James Barnard Blake (June 19, 1827 – December 18, 1870) was an American politician who served as the 15th Mayor of Worcester, Massachusetts, from 1866 to 1870. Blake was born in Boston, Massachusetts, on June 19, 1827. He was educated in the public schools of Boston and attended Chauncy Hall School.

When he was eighteen years old, he entered his uncle's firm, Blake & Darracott, which had charge of the first gas-works in Worcester.

Blake served six terms as mayor, defeating Daniel Waldo Lincoln in 1865, and Isaac Davis in 1867. During his administration, the sewer system was put into use, highways were improved, a steamer was added to the fire department, and the police force was increased.

In 1870, Blake was injured in a gas-works explosion, and died a few days later, on December 18, 1870, in Worcester.
