= Raymond Mariano =

American mayor

Ray Mariano

Mayor of Worcester, Massachusetts
- In office 1993–2002
- Preceded by: Jordan Levy
- Succeeded by: Tim Murray

Executive of the Worcester Housing Authority
- In office 2003–2016

Member of the Worcester City Council
- In office 1982–2002

Member of the Worcester School Committee
- In office 1977–1982

Personal details
- Born: September 23, 1950 (age 75) Worcester, Massachusetts
- Party: Democratic
- Spouse: Antonia K. Mariano
- Profession: Executive Director of the Worcester Housing Authority

Raymond V. Mariano (born September 23, 1950) is an American politician from Massachusetts. Mariano served as mayor of Worcester, Massachusetts. Mariano is the former executive director of the Worcester Housing Authority.

== Early life and education ==
Born in 1950, Raymond Mariano is the oldest of nine children, the son of an immigrant mother and a disabled veteran father. Mariano grew up in one of the state's largest public housing projects, Great Brook Valley.

Mariano graduated with a BA from Worcester State College and holds an MPA from Clark University (1982). Ray has taught graduate and undergraduate courses at several New England colleges and universities. His teaching includes both government and management courses.

== Family ==
Mariano is married to Antonia K. Mariano, a teacher in the Worcester Public Schools. The couple have three children.

== Political career ==
=== Early political career ===
In 1974, at the age of 24, Mariano became a candidate for the Worcester School Committee placing 7th. Mariano was elevated to fill a term of a retiring member on October 1, 1977. He was re-elected to the School Committee in 1977 and again in 1979.

In 1981, Mariano became the first member of the Worcester School Committee to ever win election to another office on his first try when he was elected to the Worcester City Council. In 1985, He was elected, by his colleagues to serve as Vice Chairman of the City Council.

=== Mayor of Worcester ===
In 1993, Mariano was elected as mayor of the city of Worcester, Massachusetts, at the time the second-largest city in New England. He was reelected in 1995, 1997 and 1999. In 1997, He was elected by the largest proportion of any mayor in Worcester's history; he was elected with the second-largest percentage in the city's history in 1995. Mariano did not seek reelection in 2001. Mariano held the position of mayor longer than anyone else in the city's history under Plan E government, and is one of only two mayors in the city's history to serve four consecutive terms.

=== Actions as mayor ===
Mariano established a highly successful committee focusing on gang and youth violence and at-risk youth. Mariano personally led an effort in 2000 which created the largest summer jobs program in the city's history, creating more than 2000 jobs for at-risk young people. Mariano also created "Operation Clean City", a citywide beautification program, which won an award for innovation from the Massachusetts Municipal Association. Included in this effort was the mayor's college clean-up program which collected nearly 240 tons of illegal debris in 5 years and involved thousands of students from area colleges. Mariano also brought home the first federal grant for the rehabilitation of Union Station and led efforts to build a new convention center (now the Worcester DCU Center). Perhaps his most well-known endeavor, He led the city during a tragic fire that claimed the life of six local firefighters.

== Executive director of the Worcester Housing Authority ==
In 2003, Mariano became executive director of the Worcester Housing Authority. This agency serves 5,000 families in 24 separate communities and is home to approximately 15,000 people. Under his leadership the agency has reduced crime by 50-75%. The agency, under Mariano, has also dramatically improved the physical condition of all property and reduced maintenance response time by 75% and developed a 90+% satisfaction rate as measured by customer survey responses.

In 2011, Mariano took steps to convert a number of properties to be entirely smoke-free. Later that same year, he instituted an innovative program to require public housing recipients under age 50 to either be working full-time or to be in school full-time, or face rent increases. He argued that public housing has become generational, rather than the short-term solution for families that it was intended to be. Mariano, a former resident of Worcester public housing himself, pitched the program as one that was designed to "make residents self-sufficient and to motivate them to move out of public housing." The program is already seen as a "public housing revolution" that could be replicated across the country.

He retired from the position in July 2016.

== Professional career ==
In 1984 and continuing through 2003, Mariano worked as a marketing and management consultant with clients throughout the Northeast. Mariano also served as a political consultant to local, state, and national candidates across the country. Mariano has worked on the presidential campaigns of Henry "Scoop" Jackson George McGovern, Al Gore, and many others.

Political offices
| Preceded by Jordan Levy | Mayor of Worcester, Massachusetts; 1993 — 2002 | Succeeded by Tim Murray |
