= Konstantina Lukes =

American politician (born 1941)

Konnie Lukes

70th Mayor of Worcester, Massachusetts
- In office January 13, 2007 – January 4, 2010
- Preceded by: Tim Murray
- Succeeded by: Joseph C. O'Brien

Councilor-at-Large of Worcester, Massachusetts
- In office 1990–2020

Personal details
- Born: Konstantina Bequary Lukes; October 13, 1941 (age 84) Waterbury, Connecticut, U.S.
- Party: Democratic
- Spouse: James J. Lukes
- Profession: Attorney

Konstantina Bequary "Konnie" Lukes (born October 13, 1941) is an American politician who served fifteen two-year terms as a Councilor-At-Large in the city of Worcester, Massachusetts. She also served as the city's mayor from 2007 to 2009.

== Early life ==
Lukes is the daughter of two Albanian immigrants. She was born and raised in Waterbury, Connecticut and worked in her parents' restaurant while attending public school. Lukes worked her way through college and law school, graduating from Simmons College and the University of Connecticut School of Law.

== Career ==
Lukes serves as a public official in Worcester, Massachusetts. She began her public service as the first Chair of the Worcester City Manager's Commission on the Status of Women. She was appointed by Massachusetts Governor Michael Dukakis as a Commissioner for the Massachusetts Commission Against Discrimination.

Lukes ran for office on the Worcester School Committee, eventually serving four terms, while also holding the position of Vice Chairman of the School Committee. She was elected to the Worcester City Council as a Councilor at Large in 1990, and also served as Vice Chairman of the Worcester City Council.

Lukes unsuccessfully sought the city's mayoralty in 1991, 1993, 1999 and 2005.

Lukes was kicked off of Worcester's Democratic City Committee after she endorsed Republican Paul Cellucci in the 1998 Massachusetts gubernatorial election.

Lukes was a frequent critic of Tim Murray during his mayoralty.

In 2005, after receiving the second most votes for mayor of anyone also elected as an at-large council member, Lukes became vice-chair of the Worcester City Council by the rules of the city charter.

In 2007, after Murray stepped-down as mayor, Lukes became mayor due to the city charter stating that the vice chair would become mayor in the instance of a vacancy. In January, 2008, she became the first popularly elected female Mayor in the history of the City of Worcester, having won the 2007 mayoral election.

Lukes lost reelection as mayor in the 2009 mayoral election, and her tenure as mayor ended in January 2010.

She unsuccessfully sought the mayoralty again in 2011, 2013, and 2017.

In 2019, she announced that she would not seek and additional term on Worcester's city council.

Konstantina Lukes is a practicing attorney and maintains a Law Office in Worcester, Massachusetts, specializing in Family law, Divorce, Probate and Real Estate law.

== Personal life ==
Konnie Lukes was married to Dr. James Lukes (born 1935), died on April 26, 2020 and they have one son, Peter, who is currently serving as the Town Manager in Holden, Massachusetts.

Political offices
Preceded by Tim Murray	Mayor of Worcester, Massachusetts; January 10, 2007-January 4, 2010	Succeeded by Joseph C. O'Brien
