= Tim Murray =

American politician

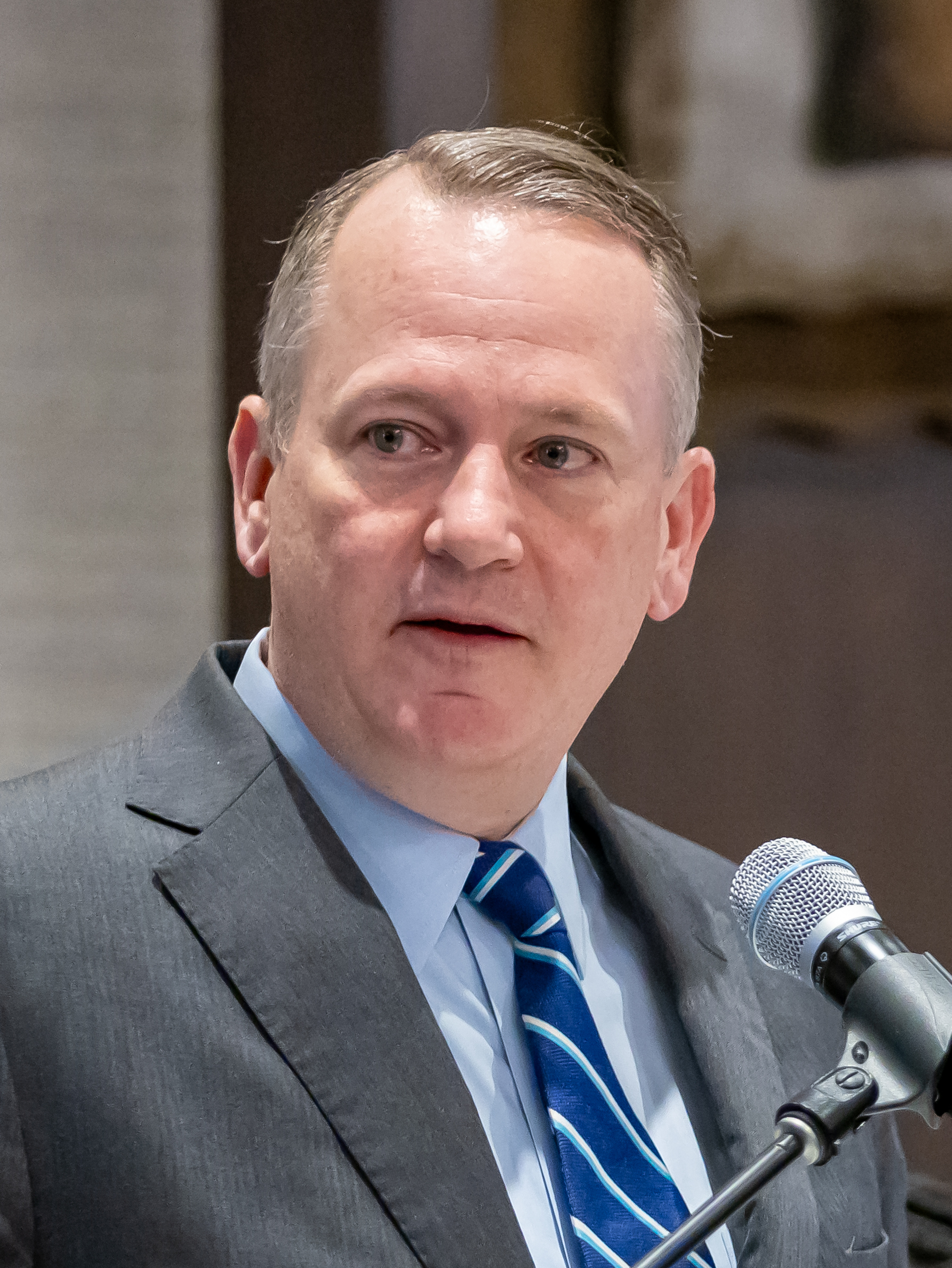
- Murray in 2024

71st Lieutenant Governor of Massachusetts
- In office January 4, 2007 – June 2, 2013
- Governor: Deval Patrick
- Preceded by: Kerry Healey
- Succeeded by: Karyn Polito

53rd Chair of the National Lieutenant Governors Association
- In office 2012–2013
- Preceded by: Rick Sheehy
- Succeeded by: Todd Lamb

69th Mayor of Worcester
- In office January 2002 – January 2007
- Preceded by: Raymond Mariano
- Succeeded by: Konstantina Lukes

Member of the Worcester City Council at-large
- In office January 1998 – January 2007

Personal details
- Born: Timothy Patrick Murray; June 7, 1968 (age 57) Worcester, Massachusetts, U.S.
- Party: Democratic
- Spouse: Tammy Sullivan
- Children: 2
- Education: Fordham University (BA); Western New England College (JD)

Timothy Patrick Murray (born June 7, 1968) is an American lawyer and member of the Democratic Party who served as the 71st lieutenant governor of Massachusetts from 2007 to 2013, when he resigned to become the head of the Worcester Regional Chamber of Commerce. Murray had previously served as a member of Worcester City Council from 1998 to 2007 and as the mayor of Worcester from 2002 to 2007 (mayors in Worcester concurrently serve as at-large members of the city council).

== Early life, education, and career ==
Murray was born and raised in Worcester. His father taught high school and his mother worked as a nurse. He attended Worcester public elementary and middle schools, and later went to St. John's High School in Shrewsbury.

Murray earned his bachelor's degree at Fordham University. While at Fordham, Murray served as an aide to Bronx Borough President, Fernando Ferrer. He put himself through law school attending classes at night while working days as a substitute school teacher. Murray holds a J.D. degree from the Western New England College School of Law.

Following law school, he became a partner in the Worcester firm of Tattan, Leonard, and Murray.

In 1997, Murray was elected to serve on the Worcester City Council as an at-large member.

== Mayor of Worcester (2001–2007) ==
Murray was elected mayor of the City of Worcester in 2001, a position he held up until 2007 when he was inaugurated as Lieutenant Governor of Massachusetts. He was reelected twice, in both 2003 and 2005. In Worcester, which has a hybrid city council/city manager form of government, the mayor is directly elected by the voting public and is considered the political leader of the city. The mayor is, by charter, chair of the city council and chair of the School Committee, overseeing the city's 23,000-student public school system. The mayor appoints the membership of city council committees and directs the council's meetings. The mayor is not the chief executive of the city; that power rests with the city manager, who is appointed by the city council.

As mayor, Murray promoted brownfields redevelopment, expanded commuter rail service and economic development. Through public advocacy, he helped to launch the largest downtown redevelopment project in the city's recent history, known as the City Square project, which involved redevelopment of a failed shopping mall on some 20 prime acres in the core of downtown Worcester. When first permitted, the City Square project was the single largest development project in Massachusetts history outside of Boston, but the $1.1 billion proposed downtown center in Quincy may surpass City Square if it is built as planned.

Murray has also served on the boards of the Worcester Public Library, Worcester Historical Museum, Worcester Community Action Council, the Worcester Working Coalition for Latino Students and Preservation Worcester.

== Lieutenant Governor of Massachusetts (2007–2013) ==
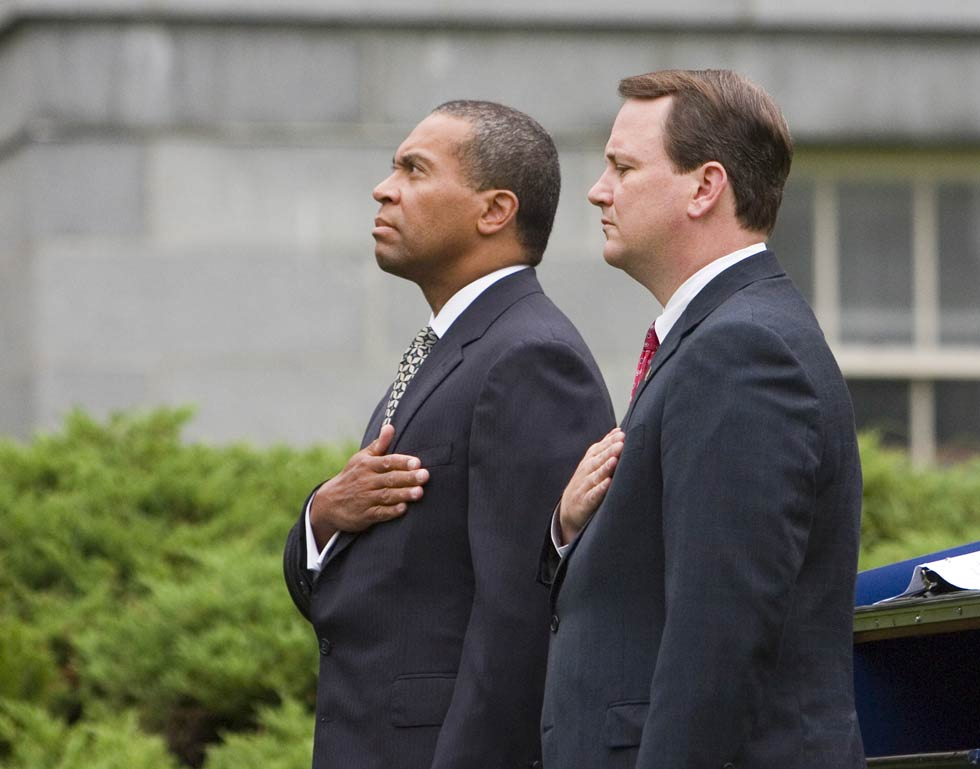
Murray and Governor Patrick in 2007

In 2006 Murray ran for the Democratic nomination for Lieutenant Governor, defeating his two opponents, Deborah Goldberg and Andrea Silbert on September 19, 2006, with 43% of the vote. He ran with the Democratic nominee for Governor, Deval Patrick, as a ticket in the 2006 elections, beating out the Republican ticket of Kerry Healey and Reed Hillman.

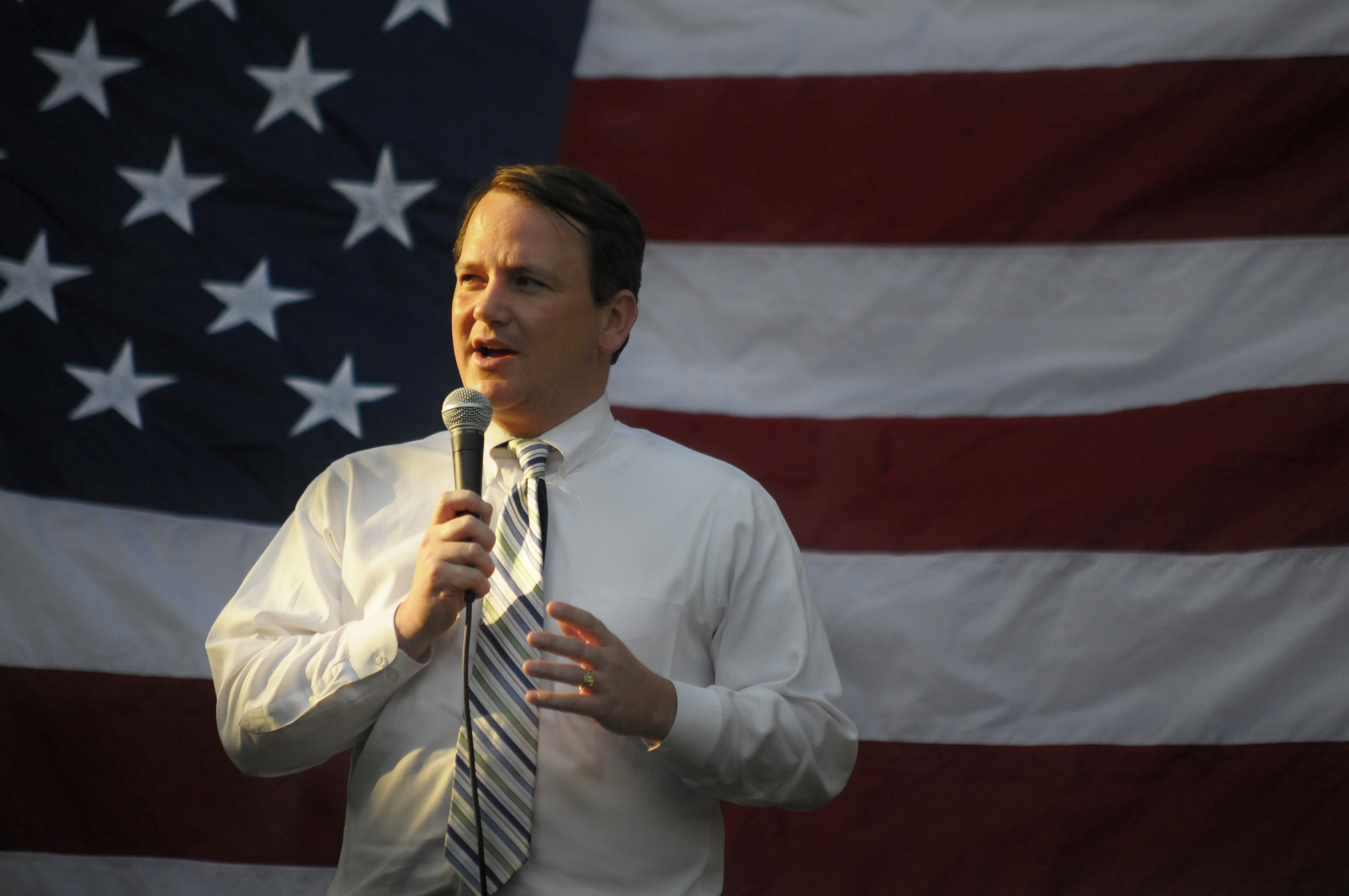
Murray in 2008

Once in office, Murray was appointed to numerous posts by Governor Deval Patrick. He was the Chairman of the Governor's Advisory Council on Veterans Services which works to provide benefits and services to members of the military and their families and secure federal grants for housing and services for veterans; he was also Chairman of the Seaport Advisory Council which works to enhance the economic development of the ports of Massachusetts and has invested millions of dollars in improvements for the ports; he was also Chairman of the Interagency Council on Housing and Homelessness working to end homelessness in Massachusetts and implement "housing first" reforms to keep families and individuals from needing to go into shelter in the first place.

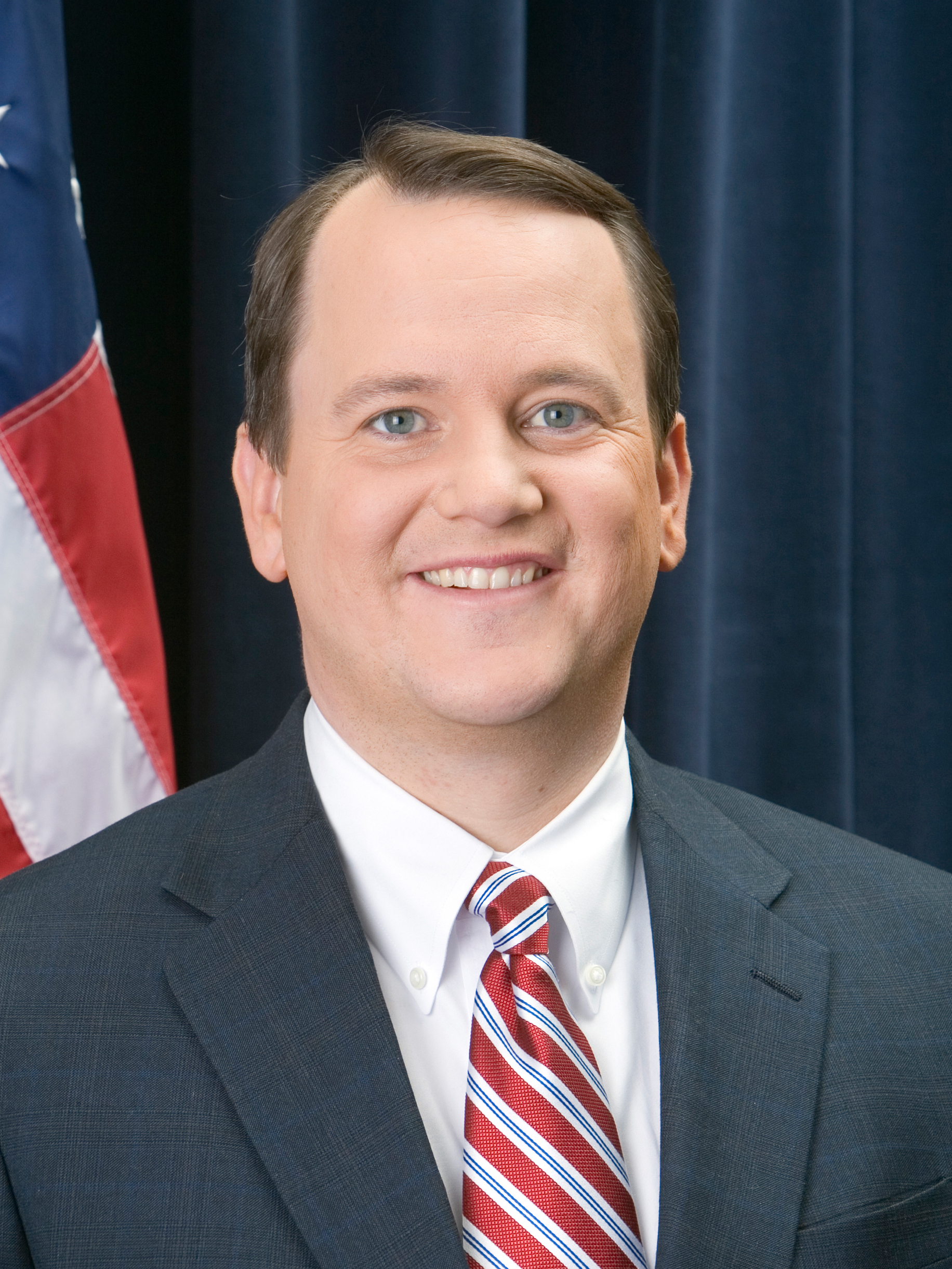
Official portrait, circa 2007

During this time, Murray also served as the Chairman of the STEM (Science, Technology, Engineering, and Math) Advisory Council, working to stress the importance of these areas of education to compete in the global marketplace. As Chairman of the STEM Council, Murray worked to provide students with real world experience in STEM using public-private partnerships. [

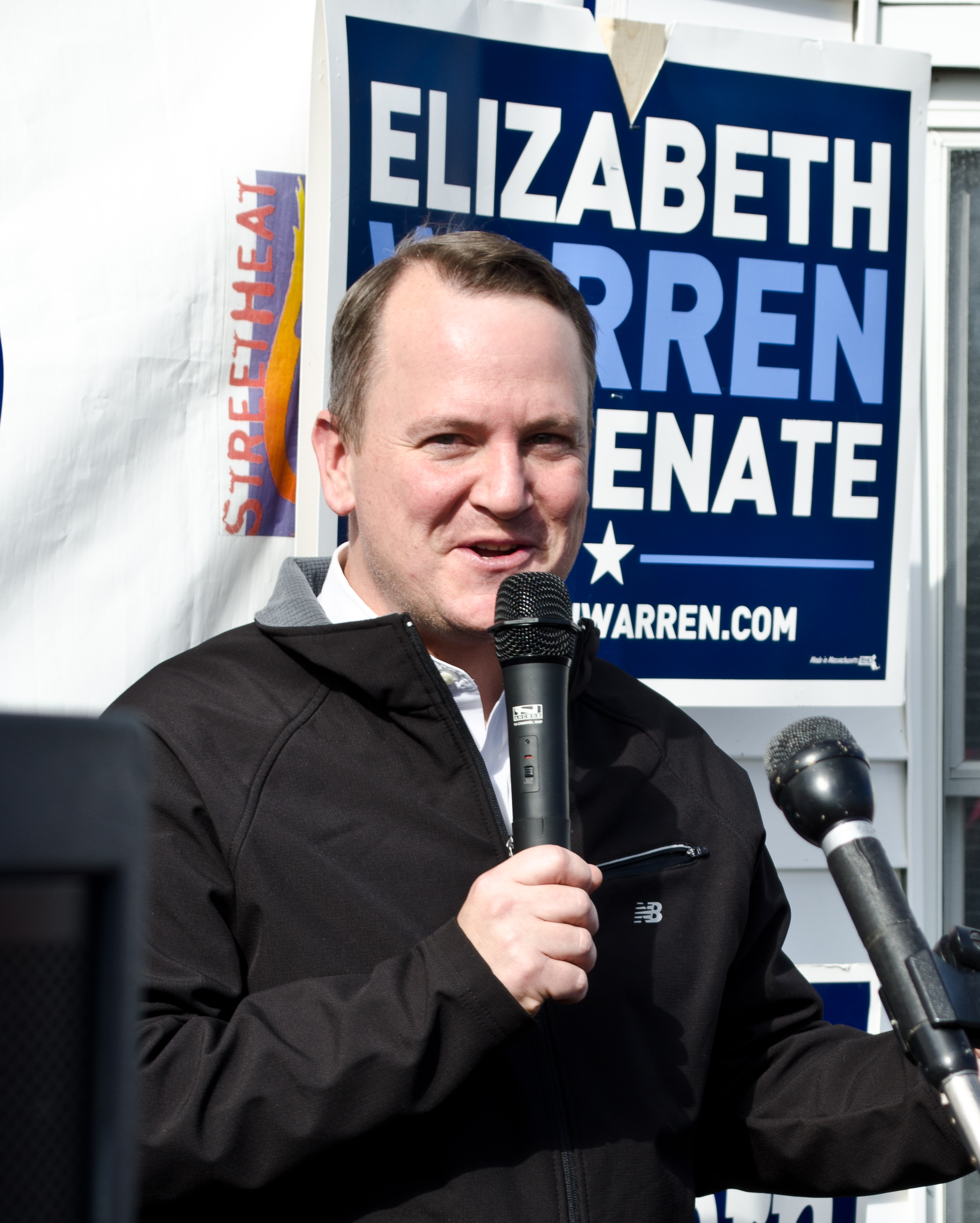
Murray speaking in support of Elizabeth Warren's 2012 U.S. Senate campaign

As the point person for Governor Patrick on passenger rail and freight service, Murray spearheaded the negotiations with CSX for an agreement to move their current rail yard from Boston to Worcester, thereby freeing up some 80 prime riverfront acres in Boston for redevelopment; increase passenger train service on the Worcester/Framingham line; open a Transflo facility in Westborough for intermodal shipping; and refurbish bridges on the rail lines in western Massachusetts to allow for double stacked trains to move all the way across the state without stopping.

As the Chairman of the Military Asset and Security Strategy Task Force, Murray worked to protect and promote Massachusetts military installations and the businesses associated with them. Last year Massachusetts received over $13.9 billion in federal contracts for industries related to national defense.

On April 2, 2010, Governor Patrick and Murray confirmed they would run for re-election. On June 5, 2010, they were endorsed by Democrats at the Massachusetts Democratic Party Convention. Both faced no other Democratic challengers. Other gubernatorial candidates in the 2010 election included Republican Charlie Baker, Independent Tim Cahill, and Green/Rainbow Jill Stein. The election took place on November 2, 2010, and Patrick and Murray were re-elected with 48.4% of the vote.

The Lieutenant Governor checked himself into St. Vincent Hospital in Worcester on July 5, 2010, after feeling chest pains. He had marched in five parades over the weekend for Independence Day celebrations in 90-degree heat. The following day, he remained hospitalized for further testing and was said to be in good spirits. On July 7 he was released from the hospital.

On January 4, 2011, Murray came across a burning minivan while driving through Worcester, Massachusetts. Hearing a witness to the accident say that children were still inside the vehicle, he approached the van and helped two children from it, returning them to their grandmother.

=== Auto crash controversy ===
On November 2, 2011, Murray crashed a government-owned vehicle on a stretch of Interstate 190. Initially, police investigating did not issue any citations.

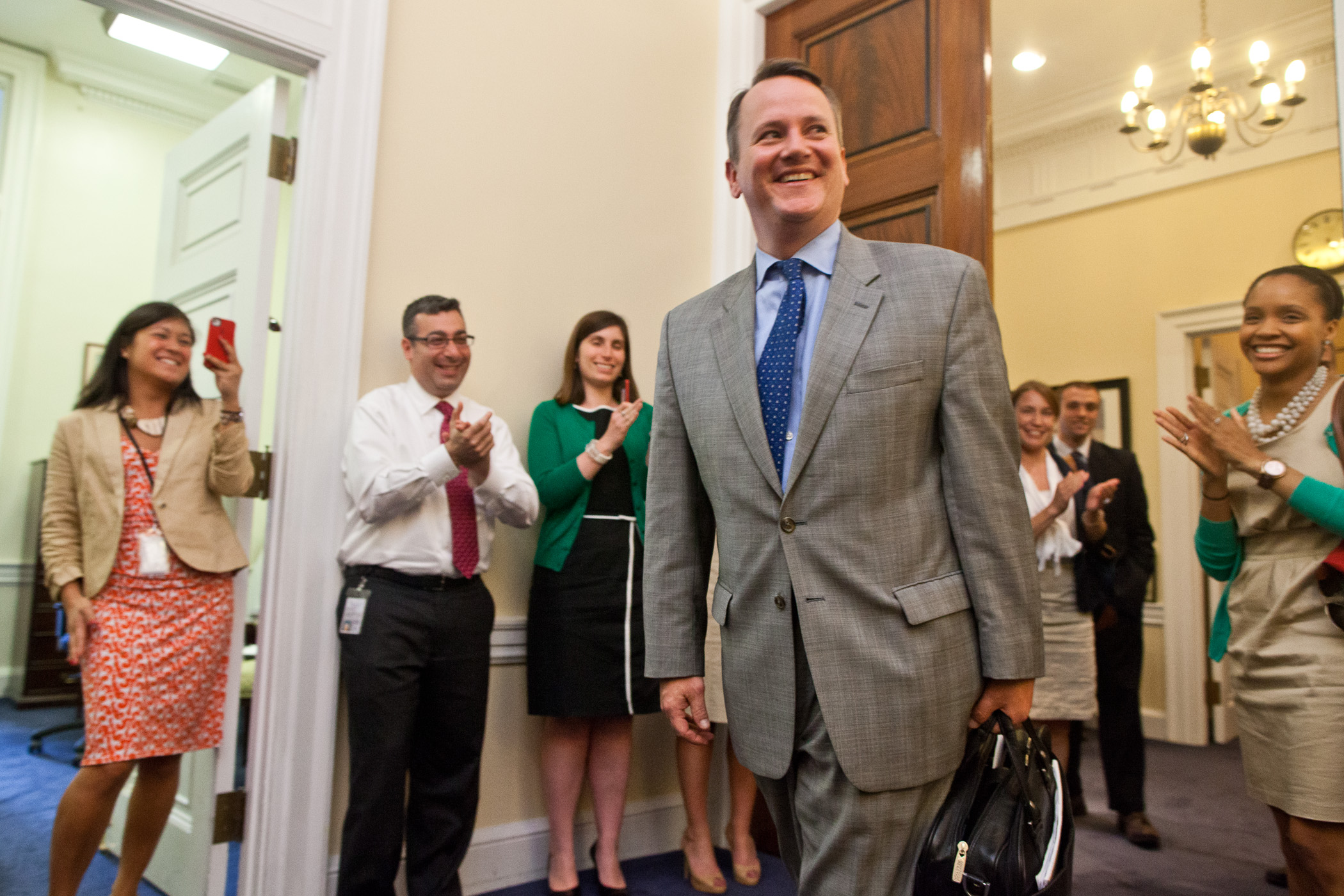
Murray on his final day as lieutenant governor

Murray initially claimed he simply lost control on the ice, wasn't speeding, was wearing a seat belt and braked. But those claims were all later disproven when the Crown Victoria black box data recorder information was released. The data revealed the car was traveling 108 miles per hour, accelerated and that Murray was not wearing a seat belt at the time the vehicle collided with a rock ledge and flipped over. Murray was unhurt in the accident.

=== Campaign contribution solicitation ===
On August 29, 2013, the Massachusetts Attorney General announced that Murray (who had already left office) and his campaign committee had agreed to pay a total of $80,000 to resolve allegations that he accepted contributions that had been unlawfully solicited by state employees on his behalf.

== Head of the Worcester Chamber of Commerce (2013–present) ==
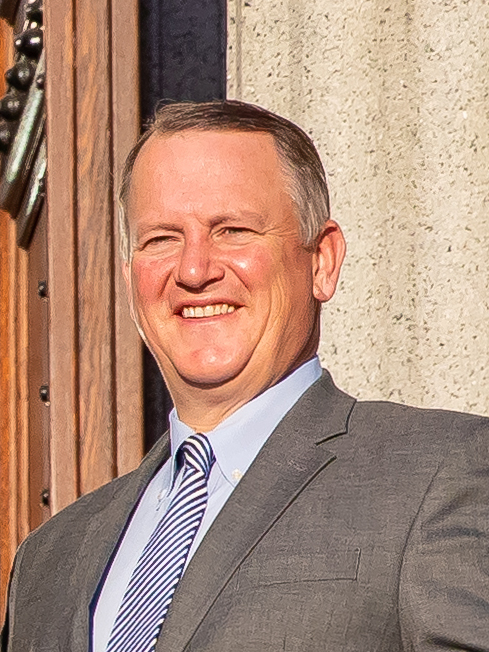
Murray in 2021

With Deval Patrick not seeking re-election in 2014, Murray was considered by some to be the front-runner for the Democratic nomination for governor. However, he announced in January 2013 that he would not run for governor. On May 22, 2013, The Boston Globe reported that Murray would resign the position of lieutenant governor to become head of the Worcester Chamber of Commerce, a job that paid more than his government salary.

== Personal life ==
He and his wife, Tammy (Sullivan) live in Worcester with their two daughters, Helen and Katerine. Tammy, also born in Worcester, is an occupational therapist who works with children.

== See also ==
- Massachusetts gubernatorial election, 2006
- Massachusetts gubernatorial election, 2010

Political offices
Preceded by Raymond Mariano	Mayor of Worcester; 2002–2007	Succeeded by Konstantina Lukes
Preceded by Kerry Healey	Lieutenant Governor of Massachusetts; 2007–2013	Vacant Title next held by Karyn Polito; 2015
Party political offices
Preceded by Chris Gabrieli	Democratic nominee for Lieutenant Governor of Massachusetts; 2006, 2010	Succeeded by Steve Kerrigan
