= WTAG =

AM news/talk radio station in Worcester, Massachusetts

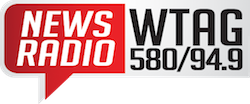
- Worcester, Massachusetts; United States
- Broadcast area: Central Massachusetts
- Frequency: 580 kHz
- Branding: NewsRadio 580/94.9 WTAG

Programming
- Format: News/talk
- Affiliations: Premiere Networks; Fox News Radio; New England Patriots Radio Network; Worcester Bravehearts

Ownership
- Owner: iHeartMedia, Inc.; (iHM Licenses, LLC)
- Sister stations: WSRS

History
- First air date: May 24, 1924
- Former call signs: WDBH (1924–1925); WCTS (1925)
- Call sign meaning: Worcester Telegram and Gazette (former owner)

Technical information
- Licensing authority: FCC
- Facility ID: 35230
- Class: B
- Power: 5,000 watts
- Transmitter coordinates: 42°20′13.33″N 71°49′13.26″W
- Translator: 94.9 W235AV (Tatnuck)
- Repeater: 96.1 WSRS-HD2 (Worcester)

Links
- Public license information: Public file; LMS
- Webcast: Listen live (via iHeartRadio)
- Website: wtag.iheart.com

WTAG (580 AM) is a radio station in Worcester, Massachusetts. It is owned by iHeartMedia and airs a news/talk format. WTAG's studios are in Paxton and it broadcasts from a transmitter in Holden, Massachusetts. The transmitter operates at 5,000 watts day and night. WTAG programming is simulcast on FM translator W235AV at 94.9 MHz, licensed to Tatnuck.

== Programming ==
WTAG's weekday program schedule includes two local shows: Jim Polito and Jordan Levy. Polito's program is regionally syndicated to WHYN in Springfield, WHJJ in Providence, Rhode Island, WXKS in Boston, and WXTK on Cape Cod. WTAG also airs nationally syndicated talk shows from Premiere Networks, iHeartMedia's programming subsidiary: The Clay Travis and Buck Sexton Show, Sean Hannity, America Now with Buck Sexton and Coast to Coast AM with George Noory; Glenn Beck Radio Program from TheBlaze Network is also aired. Weekends feature shows on money, law, house repair, gardening and restaurants, as well as repeats from some weekday shows. WTAG is a Fox News Radio affiliate.

== History ==
former logo

former logo

WTAG's history began on May 1, 1924, when the C. T. Sherer Co., a Worcester department store, received the license for WDBH. WDBH began operation May 24, 1924, with a power of 100 watts on a frequency of 268 meters (1120 kHz). The call sign was assigned by the Commerce Department as the next available block of sequential letters. The station used a play on words and represented that they stood for "We Do Business Honestly".

The call letters were changed to WCTS in March 1925. Its power went up to 500 watts in April 1925. WCTS joined the WEAF network run by AT&T about the same time.

The station was purchased by Theodore Ellis, then the owner of the Worcester Telegram & Gazette, on September 23, 1925. The call letters were changed to WTAG in October 1925. Ellis sold the newspapers and radio station in December 1925 to Harry Stoddard and George F. Booth (1960 recipient of the Yankee Quill Award). Their families would own the station until 1987.

A studio was constructed on the fourth floor of the newspaper building at 18 Franklin Street. Broadcasting began there in May 1926. The transmitter was still at Sherer's department store on Front Street. The transmitter was a Western Electric IB and the antenna an inverted L.

In July 1926 the wavelength was changed to 545.1 meters (550 kHz). It remained there until June 15, 1927, when the wavelength was changed to 516.9 meters (580 kHz). WTAG has remained on 580 kHz ever since.

WTAG was a charter member of the NBC Radio Network. It carried their first broadcast November 15, 1926.

From 1927 until 1934 the station ran various power levels on 580 kHz, finally ending up with 500 watts from a T antenna at 20 Franklin Street, the Telegram & Gazette building. An RCA 1-B transmitter was put on the air in 1931 and was used occasionally until the mid-1960s.

Limited by the downtown location, a site was located that would allow for construction of towers. A farm on Shrewsbury Street in Holden, about 5 miles (8.0 km) north of the center of Worcester, was purchased in 1934. Construction of a new transmitting facility was begun in 1935. On February 2, 1937, WTAG began transmitting with a power of 1,000 watts using a three tower directional antenna system. The transmitter used was an RCA 1-D which was kept until 1977.

On September 21, 1938, the 1938 New England hurricane leveled all three towers between 5:00 and 5:20 pm. WTAG operated from the 20 Franklin Street location until May 19, 1939, when the replacement of all three towers was completed. The replacement towers, self-supported and 375 feet (114 m) tall built by the Blaw-Knox company, are still in use today.

WTAG's master control and studios were substantially renovated in 1939. The acoustics of the studio were much improved and theater seating allowed for an audience for live programming. The custom RCA mixing console was one of the largest built by RCA for a radio station. WTAG had its own orchestra and originated many music and dramatic shows from studio A.

The station's daytime power was increased to 5,000 watts on April 9, 1940. Nighttime operation with 5,000 watts began January 2, 1942. Two additional Blaw-Knox towers were added to allow 5 kW directional night time operation. The five towers at the Holden site survived the 1953 Worcester tornado. However, one of the towers was lost to Hurricane Carol in 1954. The nighttime directional pattern was reworked to use the four remaining towers. The fallen one was never replaced.

WTAG's affiliation with NBC ended on April 5, 1943, when the station joined CBS, replacing WORC (which moved to the Blue Network); the Worcester area would thereafter receive NBC's programming via WBZ in Boston and WBZA in Springfield. On December 31, 1958, WTAG announced that it would leave CBS Radio in June 1959 over the station's opposition to the network's "Program Consolidation Plan"; it was the third station to announce its departure from CBS (after WJR in Detroit and WSAN in Allentown, Pennsylvania) out of an eventual 20 stations, and had been one of eight stations to oppose the plan upon its announcement in October 1958. WTAG would operate as an independent until July 1, 1963, when it rejoined NBC Radio.

The station was the radio home of the Boston Red Sox in the Worcester area for 40 years, from 1967 to 2006. The Red Sox' Worcester affiliation moved to WVEI and WCRN in 2007.

In 1987, after selling the Telegram & Gazette to the owners of the San Francisco Chronicle, the Stoddard and Booth families sold WTAG to the Knight Quality Group for $2.8 million. The sale put WTAG under the same ownership as WSRS; that station had, as WTAG-FM, itself been sold by the Telegram & Gazette to Knight Quality in 1963. By 1989, WTAG was one of only four original NBC affiliates to still be affiliated with the radio network.

Knight Quality Stations announced the sale of its eight New England radio stations, including WTAG and WSRS, to Capstar Broadcasting Partners in April 1997; upon assuming control in January 1998, the stations were operated by Capstar's Atlantic Star Communications subsidiary. Capstar and Chancellor Media announced in August 1998 that they would merge (Hicks, Muse, Tate & Furst was a major shareholder in both companies); upon the merger's completion in July 1999, the combined company was named AMFM Inc. AMFM was in turn acquired by Clear Channel Communications (forerunner to iHeartMedia) in a deal announced on October 4, 1999, and completed in August 2000.

WTAG, which had rejoined CBS in 1993, ended its 14-year affiliation with the network and joined Fox News Radio in February 2007. Over 100 other Clear Channel stations had already been affiliated with Fox News Radio since 2005.

== Awards ==
In 1945, WTAG received the Alfred I. duPont Award "for outstanding public service in encouraging, promoting and developing American ideals of freedom, and for loyal, devoted service to the nation and to the community" and the Peabody Award "for outstanding contribution to the welfare of the community it serves".

== Translator ==
Broadcast translator for WTAG
Call sign	Frequency	City of license	FID	ERP (W)	HAAT	Class	Transmitter coordinates	FCC info
W235AV	94.9 FM	Tatnuck, Massachusetts	138657	230	232.1 m (761 ft)	D	42°18′34.3″N 71°54′11.3″W	LMS
