= Jordan Levy =

American politician (1943–2023)

Member of the Massachusetts Executive Council 7th Councilor District
- In office 1995–1998
- Preceded by: James D. O'Brien, Jr.
- Succeeded by: Dennis P. McManus

62nd and 67th Mayor of Worcester, Massachusetts
- In office 1988–1993
- In office 1980–1981

Member of the Worcester, Massachusetts City Council
- In office 1975–1994

Personal details
- Born: November 4, 1943 Worcester, Massachusetts
- Died: October 5, 2023 (aged 79)
- Party: Independent
- Spouse: Maxine l. Levy (died 2010)

Jordan Levy (November 4, 1943 – October 5, 2023) was an American Independent politician and talk radio host from Worcester, Massachusetts. He served as the Mayor of Worcester on two occasions, first from 1981 to 1982 and the second time from 1988 to 1993. He was the host of The Jordan Levy Show on WTAG (580-AM) from 3–6 PM on weekdays.

== Mayor of Worcester, Massachusetts ==
=== Plan E appointed mayor ===
When Levy first became mayor, Worcester had a Plan E government. The office of mayor was a largely ceremonial office. City government in Worcester was organized as a 9-member city council (all at-large), a ceremonial mayor elected from the council by the councilors, and a council-appointed city manager. The manager oversees the daily administration of the city, makes all appointments to city offices, and can be removed at any time by a majority vote of the council. The mayor chairs the city council and the school committee, and does not have the power to veto any vote.

=== Elected Mayor by popular vote ===
In 1987 Levy was elected as mayor, he was the first popularly elected mayor in 40 years. For the 1987 elections Worcester had changed the city charter. This "Home Rule" charter (named for the method of adoption of the charter) is similar to Plan E, the major changes being to the structure of the council and the election of the mayor. The 9-member Council became 11, 6 At-Large and 1 from each city district. The mayor is chosen by popular election, but must run as an At-Large Councilor.

== Massachusetts Executive Council ==
In 1994 Levy was elected to the Massachusetts Executive Council Seventh Councilor District. Levy served from 1995 to 1998.

== Massachusetts Turnpike Authority ==
He was appointed to the Massachusetts Turnpike Authority for seven years by Governor Paul Cellucci in 1997.

== Personal life and death ==
On April 28, 2010, Levy lost his wife, Maxine Levy after a battle with cancer.

He died on October 5, 2023, at the age of 79.

== Notes ==
Political offices
Preceded by Thomas J. Early	62nd Mayor of Worcester, Massachusetts; 1981–1982	Succeeded by Sara Robertson
Preceded by Timothy J. Cooney, Jr.	67th Mayor of Worcester, Massachusetts; 1988–1993	Succeeded by Raymond Mariano
Preceded by James D. O'Brien, Jr.	Member of the Massachusetts Executive Council; 7th Councilor district 1995–1998	Succeeded by Dennis P. McManus
