= CLAWS (linguistics) =

Computer program for part-of-speech tagging

The Constituent Likelihood Automatic Word-tagging System (CLAWS) is a program that performs part-of-speech tagging. It was developed in the 1980s at Lancaster University by the University Centre for Computer Corpus Research on Language. It has an overall accuracy rate of 96–97% with the latest version (CLAWS4) tagging around 100 million words of the British National Corpus.

== History ==
A Part-Of-Speech Tagger (POS Tagger) is a piece of software that reads text in some language and assigns parts of speech to each word (and other token), such as noun, verb, adjective, etc., although generally computational applications use more fine-grained POS tags like 'noun-plural'. Developed in the early 1980s, CLAWS was built to fill the ever-growing gap created by always-changing POS necessities. Originally created to add part-of-speech tags to the LOB corpus of British English, the CLAWS tagset has since been adapted to other languages as well, including Urdu and Arabic.

Since its inception, CLAWS has been hailed for its functionality and adaptability. Still, it is not without flaws, and though it boasts an error-rate of only 1.5% when judged in major categories, CLAWS still remains with c.3.3% ambiguities unresolved. Ambiguity arises in cases such as with the word flies, and whether it should be classified as a noun or a verb. It's these ambiguities that will require the various upgrades and tagsets that CLAWS will endure.

== Rules and processing ==
CLAWS uses a Hidden Markov model to determine the likelihood of sequences of words in anticipating each part-of-speech label.

=== Sample output ===
Sample outputs of CLAWS
C5	-----_PUN "_PUQ Welcome_VVB to_PRP my_DPS house_NN1 !_SENT -----_PUN Enter_VVB freely_AV0 and_CJC of_PRF your_DPS own_DT0 will_NN1 !_PUN "_SENT -----_PUN He_PNP made_VVD no_AT0 motion_NN1 of_PRF stepping_VVG to_TO0 meet_VVI me_PNP ,_PUN but_CJC stood_VVD like_PRP a_AT0 statue_NN1 ,_PUN as_CJS though_CJS his_DPS gesture_NN1 of_PRF welcome_NN1 had_VHD fixed_VVN him_PNP into_PRP stone_SENT ._PUN
C7	"_" Welcome_VV0 to_II my_APPGE house_NN1 !_! Enter_VV0 freely_RR and_CC of_IO your_APPGE own_DA will_NN1 !_! "_" He_PPHS1 made_VVD no_AT motion_NN1 of_IO stepping_VVG to_TO meet_VVI me_PPIO1, _, but_CCB stood_VVD like_II a_AT1 statue_NN1, _, as_CS21 though_CS22 his_APPGE gesture_NN1 of_IO welcome_NN1 had_VHD fixed_VVN him_PPHO1 into_II stone_NN1 ._.

This excerpt from Bram Stoker's Dracula (1897) has been tagged using both the CLAWS C5 and C7 tagsets. This is what a CLAWS output will generally look like, with the most likely part-of-speech tag following each word.

== Tagsets ==
=== CLAWS1 tagset ===
The first tagset developed in CLAWS, CLAWS1 tagset, has 132 word tags. In terms of form and application, C1 tagset is similar to Brown Corpus tags. See Table of tags in C1 tagset here.

=== CLAWS2 tagset ===
From 1983 to 1986, updated versions leading to CLAWS2 were part of a larger attempt to deal with aspects such as recognizing sentence breaks, in order to avoid the need for manual pre-processing of a text before the tags were applied, moving instead to optional manual post-editing to adjust the output of the automatic annotation, if needed. The CLAWS2 tagset has 166 word tags. See Table of tags in C2 tagset here.

=== CLAWS4 tagset ===
The CLAWS4 was used for the 100-million-word British National Corpus (BNC). A general-purpose grammatical tagger, it is a successor of the CLAWS1 tagger. In tagging the BNC, the many rounds of work that went into CLAWS4 focused on making the CLAWS program independent from the tagsets. For example, the BNC project used two tagset versions: "a main tagset (C5) with 62 tags with which the whole of the corpus has been tagged, and a larger (C7) tagset with 152 tags, which has been used to make a selected 'core' sample corpus of two million words." The latest version of CLAWS4 is offered by UCREL, a research center of Lancaster University.

=== CLAWS5 tagset ===
The CLAWS5 tagset, which was used for BNC, has over 60 tags. See Table of tags in C5 tagset here.

=== CLAWS6 tagset ===
The CLAWS6 tagset was used for the BNC sampler corpus and the COLT corpus. It has over 160 tags, including 13 determiner subtypes. See Table of tags in C6 tagset here.

=== CLAWS7 tagset ===
The standard CLAWS7 tagset is used currently. It is only different in the punctuation tags when compared to the CLAWS6 tagset. See Table of tags in C7 tagset here.

=== CLAWS8 tagset ===
CLAWS8 tagset was extended from C7 tagset with further distinctions in the determiner and pronoun categories, as well as 37 new auxiliary tags for forms of be, do, and have. See Table of tags in C8 tagset here

== See also ==
- Brill tagger
- Part-of-speech tagging
- Sliding window based part-of-speech tagging
- British National Corpus (BNC)
- Brown Corpus
- Lancaster University
- Hidden Markov model
