= International Computer Archive of Modern and Medieval English =

The International Computer Archive of Modern and Medieval English (ICAME) is an international group of linguists and data scientists working in corpus linguistics to digitise English texts. The organisation was founded in Oslo, Norway in 1977 as the International Computer Archive of Modern English, before being renamed to its current title.

Its primary objectives were:

- collecting and distributing information on
  - English language material available for computer processing; and
  - linguistic research completed or in progress on this material;
- compiling an archive of corpora to be located at the University of Bergen, from where copies of the material can be obtained at cost.

The portal to their materials is hosted at the University of Bergen, where they have set out the aim of the organization to "collect and distribute information on English language material available for computer processing and on linguistic research to compile an archive of English text corpora in machine-readable form, and to make material available to research institutions." Creating computer corpora, i.e. collections of texts in machine-readable form, is the most accessible way to study both transcribed spoken language and various genres of written texts for modern scholars, including both "descriptive and more theoretically-minded linguists".

The ICAME group hosts academic conferences that focus on corpus linguistic studies of historical changes and contemporary grammatical descriptions of English, and makes corpora of different varieties of English available to scholars, starting with editions of the 1960s Brown Corpus. Their first academic conference was held in Bergen, Norway in 1979, and scholars who were interested in corpus linguistics continued to meet each spring in different European and English-speaking countries. At these meetings, the compilation and distribution of corpora they enabled played a key role in the creation of the field of corpus linguistics in the 20th century, a precursor to current big data analytics. In summarizing the field, Kennedy's Introduction to Corpus Linguistics notes that "for corpus linguists with an interest in the description of English, the International Computer Archive of Modern and Medieval English has been the major resource". The influence of ICAME on the field has also been laid out in Facchinetti's history, Corpus Linguistics Twenty-five Years On.

One influential resource that ICAME made available was a CD of 20 different corpora, including those covering different regional Englishes (such as the Australian Corpus of English, the Wellington Corpus of Spoken New Zealand English, the Kolhapur Corpus of Indian English, the Bergen Corpus of London Teenage Language (COLT), the Helsinki Corpus of Older Scots, and the International Corpus of English—East-African component), as well as versions of the Brown Corpus and the Lancaster-Bergen-Oslo (LOB) corpus tagged for part of speech.

ICAME also published an annual journal, the ICAME Journal, formerly ICAME News, that contains articles, conference reports, reviews and notices related to corpus linguistics. The current editors of the ICAME Journal are Merja Kytö and Anna-Brita Stenström.

I am wearing a tie clip in the shape of a monkey wrench... The story behind this peculiar piece of jewelry goes back to the early 60s when I was assembling the notorious Brown Corpus and others were using computers to make concordances of William Butler Yeats and other poets. One of my colleagues, a specialist in modem Irish literature, was heard to remark that anyone who would use a computer on good literature was nothing but a plumber. Some of my students responded by forming a linguistic plumber's union, the symbol of which was, of course, a monkey wrench.

— W. Nelson Francis, Dinner speech given at the 5th ICAME Conference on Computers in English Language Research, Windermere, England, 21 May 1984, ICAME news, issue 10 (1985).
