= Samuel Winslow (disambiguation) =

Samuel Winslow was an American politician.

Samuel Winslow may also refer to:

- Samuel Winslow (patentee)
- Samuel Winslow (mayor)
