= Thomas Plunket (disambiguation) =

Thomas Plunket (1785–1839) was an Irish soldier in the British Army.

Thomas Plunket or Plunkett may also refer to:

- Thomas Plunkett (1841–1885), color bearer during the American Civil War
- Thomas Plunket (Chief Justice) (died 1519), Irish landowner, lawyer and judge
- Thomas Plunket, 2nd Baron Plunket (1792–1866), bishop of Tuam, Killaly and Achonry
- Thomas Fitz-Christopher Plunket (died 1471), Irish lawyer and judge
- Tom Plunkett (1878–1957), member of the Queensland Legislative Assembly
- Thomas Plunkett, senior (1840–1913), member of the Queensland Legislative Assembly
