= Charles Pinkham =

Charles Pinkham may refer to:

- Charles H. Pinkham (1844–1920), Medal of Honor recipient in the American Civil War
- Charles Pinkham (politician) (1853–1938), English Conservative politician
