= Hope Cemetery (Worcester, Massachusetts) =

Historic cemetery in Massachusetts, United States

- U.S. National Register of Historic Places
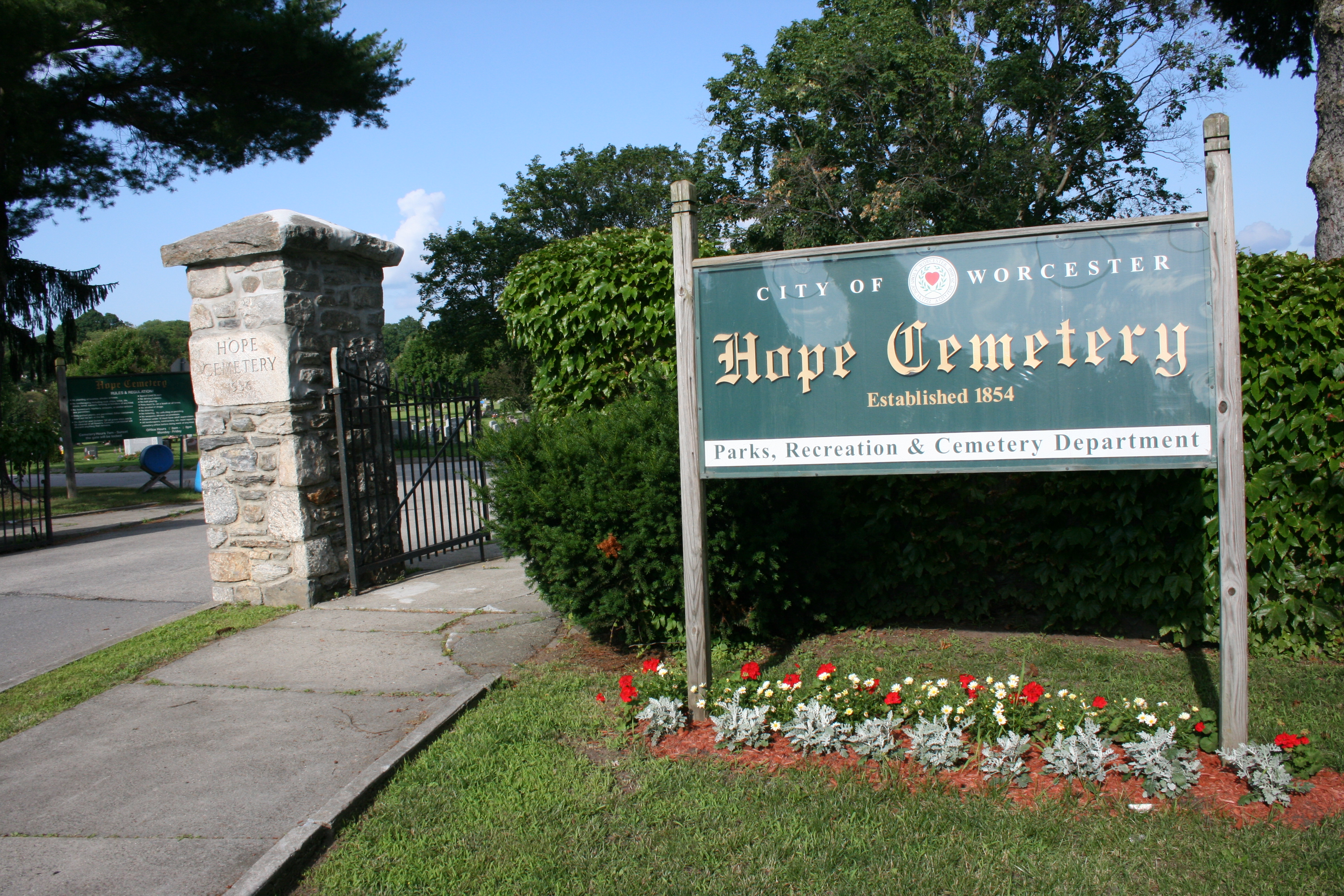

- Location within Massachusetts Location within the United States
- Location: 119 Webster St., Worcester, Massachusetts
- Coordinates: 42°14′10″N 71°49′34″W
- Area: 168 acres (68 ha)
- Built: 1854
- Architect: Stephen Earle, Fuller & Delano
- NRHP reference No.: 97001560
- Added to NRHP: December 22, 1997

Hope Cemetery is an historic rural cemetery at 119 Webster Street in Worcester, Massachusetts. Established in 1854, it was the city's sixth public cemetery, and is the burial site of remains originally interred at its first five cemeteries. Its landscaping and funerary art are representative of the rural cemetery movement, and the cemetery was listed on the National Register of Historic Places in 1997. The cemetery occupies 168 acres (68 ha).

== Description and history ==
Hope Cemetery is located in far southern Worcester, atop a rise known as Webster Hill, which has commanding views to the north and east, including the campuses of Clark University and the College of the Holy Cross. The cemetery was laid out, probably by a landscape designer (although none has been identified), in the rural cemetery style, with winding lanes that take advantage of the terrain. It also includes horticultural plantings of note, another hallmark of the rural cemetery style, including several distinguished specimens of beech, Norway maple, sugar maple, cedar, ash, and oak trees.

Worcester's first burying ground was located at Thomas and Summer Streets, and was established in 1713, and had seventeen graves marked by stone mounds, and the second burying ground, located on the Worcester Common, had more than 100 burials, all of which were relocated here in the 20th century. The third burying ground, Raccoon Plain, was a small cemetery with sixteen burials, all of which were reinterred here in 1857. The fourth burying ground, at Mechanic Street, had more than 1000 burials, which were moved here in 1878–79. The Pine Meadow Burying Ground's 658 interments were relocated here between 1862 and 1878.

== Notable interments ==
- Agnes Ballard, architect, educator, one of the first women elected to office in Florida
- William A. Bennett (1887–1970), mayor of Worcester, sheriff of Worcester County, and state representative
- Elizabeth Bishop, poet
- George H. Clemence (1865–1924), architect
- Estelle Pinckney Clough (1866–1929), opera singer
- Loring Coes, inventor of the monkey wrench
- Walter J. Cookson (1876–1936), mayor of Worcester
- Austin P. Cristy (1850–1926), newspaper publisher
- Rufus B. Dodge Jr. (1861–1935), mayor of Worcester
- Benjamin D. Dwinnell (1834–1916), military officer and politician
- Abby Kelley Foster, 19th-century social reformer and feminist
- Stephen Symonds Foster, radical abolitionist
- Robert Goddard, engineer, inventor of the first liquid-fueled rocket
- John Bartholomew Gough, temperance lecturer
- Bruno Haas (1891–1952), MLB pitcher and NFL player
- Iver Johnson, firearm, bicycle and motorcycle manufacturer
- Art LaVigne (1855–1950), MLB catcher
- James Logan (1852–1929), mayor of Worcester
- Everett F. Merrill (1898–1955), businessman and city manager of Worcester
- Charles H. Pinkham, Medal of Honor recipient
- Thomas Plunkett, Medal of Honor recipient
- John Rucho (1922–2015), state representative
- Amy Tanner, psychologist at Clark University
- Eli Thayer (1819–1899), U.S. representative
- John A. Thayer (1857–1917), U.S. representative
- Webster Thayer, trial judge in the Sacco and Vanzetti case
- Samuel Winslow (1827–1894), mayor of Worcester
- Samuel Winslow (1862–1940), U.S. Representative
- George Merrill Wright (1865–1926), mayor of Worcester

== See also ==
- National Register of Historic Places listings in southwestern Worcester, Massachusetts
- National Register of Historic Places listings in Worcester County, Massachusetts
- Rural Cemetery (Worcester, Massachusetts), a private rural cemetery
