= Eric Brill =

American computer scientist

- Education: B.Sc in mathematics MS in Computer Science; Ph.D
- Alma mater: University of Chicago; UT Austin; University of Pennsylvania

Eric Brill is a computer scientist specializing in natural language processing. He created the Brill tagger, a supervised part of speech tagger. Another research paper of Brill introduced a machine learning technique now known as transformation-based learning.

== Biography ==
Brill earned a BA in mathematics from the University of Chicago in 1987 and a MS in Computer Science from UT Austin in 1989. In 1994, he completed his PhD at the University of Pennsylvania. He was an assistant professor at Johns Hopkins University from 1994 to 1999. In 1999, he left JHU for Microsoft Research, he developed a system called "Ask MSR" that answered search engine queries written as questions in English, and was quoted in 2004 as predicting the shift of Google's web-page based search to information based search. In 2009 he moved to eBay to head their research laboratories.
