= Stenström =

Stenström is a Swedish surname. Notable people with the surname include:

- Anna-Brita Stenström (born 1932), Swedish academic linguist
- Filip Stenström (born 1991), Swedish footballer
- Johan Stenström (born 1951), Swedish literary scholar
- Katarina Stenström Ros (born 1966), Swedish politician
- Oscar Stenström (1978–2015), Finnish cyclist
- Thomas Stenström (born 1988), Swedish singer
