= Austin P. Cristy =

American newspaper publisher (1850–1926)

Austin Phelps Cristy
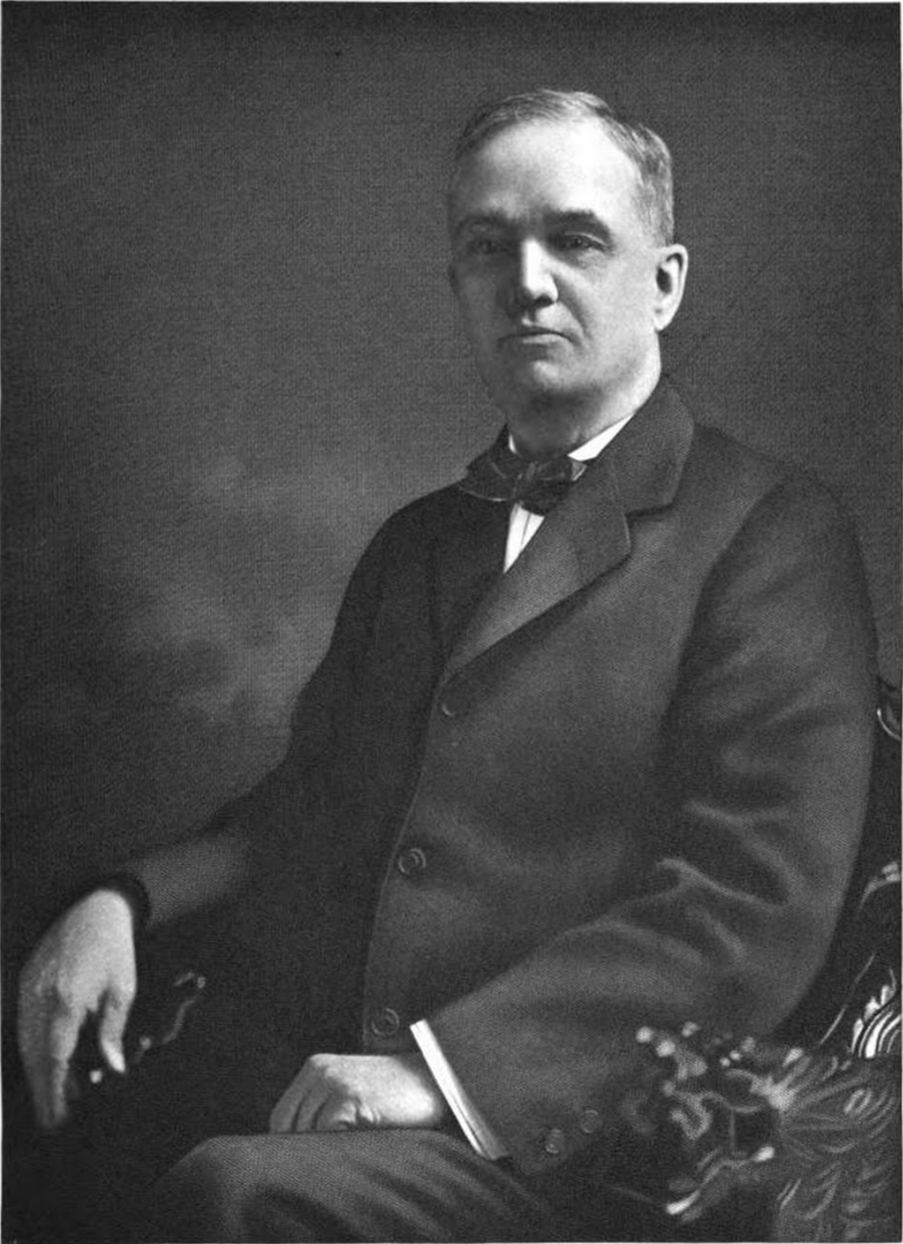
- Born: May 8, 1850; Morristown, Vermont, U.S.
- Died: December 1, 1926 (aged 76); Worcester, Massachusetts, U.S.
- Resting place: Hope Cemetery
- Occupation: Publisher

Signature
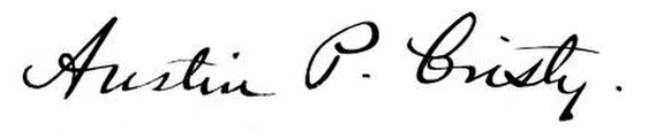

Austin Phelps Cristy (May 8, 1850 – December 1, 1926) was a newspaper publisher. He was born in Morristown, Vermont, to John Baker Cristy and Louisa Lydia Cristy, née Cooke. He attended Reading High School in Reading, Massachusetts, and Monson Academy in Wilbraham. He was at Amherst College for three terms in 1869 and 1870, but did not graduate there; he gained a Bachelor of Arts degree from Dartmouth College, graduating in 1873. He was admitted to the bar in about 1874 and began practicing law in Marblehead, then opened a law office in Worcester the following year. From 1882 to September 1884 he was assistant clerk of the Central District Court in Worcester.

He founded the Worcester Sunday Telegram, with the first issue appearing on November 30, 1884, followed by the Daily Telegram two years later. He focused on sensational stories, emphasizing crimes and scandals, and was also a Republican, often attacking Democrats in the pages of the newspaper. He made political enemies during his time at the Central District Court, and later said that "The Telegram was started to square accounts with those who had been hostile". He also crusaded against alcohol, though a rival paper once reported he had been brought to their offices while drunk.

The paper was a success, and he remained editor and owner until he sold the paper to Theodore T. Ellis in 1920 for $1,000,000. Ellis had worked in the Telegram's pressroom, but Cristy let him go because Ellis was working on inventions to improve the printing process and Cristy asked him to either stop or resign. Ellis's inventions were successful and made enough money for him to purchase the paper from Cristy.

He published a guide book for his reporters, and his sayings, such as "The body of a person drowned should not be called a floater. No dead body should be called a stiff." became known as Cristyisms.

On May 26, 1876 Cristy married Mary Elizabeth Bassett; she died in November 1913 and he remarried on January 12, 1915, to Katherine V. Horan. He had three sons, Horace, Austin, and Roger, and two daughters, Mary and Edna, all by his first marriage.

He attempted to commit suicide on November 29, 1926, possibly because of financial problems, though it may have been because of concerns over his health. He shot himself near the heart with a revolver, in the office of a broker. He died of his wounds two days later. He was buried in Hope Cemetery in Worcester.
