= Karin Aijmer =

Swedish linguist

Karin Aijmer (born 15 January 1939) is a Swedish linguist whose research focuses on topics in pragmatics and discourse, including ways of expressing epistemic modality/evidentiality, pragmatic markers, conversational routines and other fixed phrases. She uses corpus-based methods involving both monolingual and multilingual corpora of English and Swedish for data. She received her PhD in English Linguistics from Stockholm University in 1972. She has been an associate professor in the Department of English at Oslo University and at Lund University and is now professor emerita in the Department of Languages and Literatures at the University of Gothenburg.

She serves on the Scientific Committee of ICAME. She is a member of the Cambridge Grammar reference panel. From 2004 to 2013 she served as president of the Swedish Society for the Study of English (SWESSE). She is the editor of the Nordic Journal of English Studies and co-editor of Contrastive Pragmatics - A Cross-Disciplinary Journal.

== Awards and distinctions ==
Aijmer was elected as a member of the Royal Society of Arts and Sciences in Göteborg (Kungliga Vetenskaps- och Vitterhetssamhället i Göteborg) in 1998.

Along with Bengt Altenberg, she received a research fellowship associated with the program ‘English in a contrastive perspective,’ at Lund University from 1993 to 1996.

She received research fellowships at the Royal Flemish Academy of Belgium for Science and the Arts in Brussels in the fall of 2001 and 2002.

== Publications ==
- 2012. Karin Aijmer. Understanding pragmatic markers. A variational pragmatic approach. Edinburgh University Press.
- 2012. Dawn Archer, Karin Aijmer and Anne Wichmann. Pragmatics. An advanced resource book for students. London and New York: Routledge.
- 2007. Anne-Marie Simon-Vandenbergen and Karin Aijmer, The semantic field of modal certainty: a study of adverbs in English. (Topics in English Linguistics). Mouton de Gruyter,
- 2003. Karin Aijmer and Anne-Marie Simon-Vandenbergen. "The discourse particle well and its equivalents in Swedish and Dutch" Linguistics 41(6):1123–1161.
- 2002. Karin Aijmer, English discourse particles. Evidence from a corpus. (Topics in English Linguistics). Amsterdam/Philadelphia: John Benjamins
- 1996. Karin Aijmer, Conversational routines in English: convention and creativity. London: Longman.
- 1991. Karin Aijmer and Bengt Altenberg, eds. English Corpus Linguistics. Routledge.
