= Anna-Brita Stenström =

Norwegian linguist (1932–2023)

Anna-Brita Stenström [ˈanəˌbrit̬ə'st̬ɨnstɹɪm] (1932 – 22 December 2023) was a Swedish linguist whose areas of research included corpus linguistics, sociolinguistics, pragmatics, and discourse analysis. She initiated and co-directed three online corpora of adolescent language: The Bergen Corpus of London Teenage Language (COLT), Ungdomsspråk och språkkontakt i Norden (UNO), and Corpus Oral de Lenguaje Adolescente (COLA).

== Biography ==
Stenström was professor emerita of English Linguistics at the University of Bergen, Norway. She also was a foreign member of the Norwegian Academy of Science and Letters. She died on 22 December 2023.

== Research ==
Stenström's research focused primarily on corpora studies, particularly regarding the speech of young people. Between 1984 and 2023, she published more than 20 books and articles.

In 1996, she published An Introduction to Spoken Interaction, which places an emphasis on conversation through multiple means as well as describes and analyzes conversations. Using the London-Lund Corpus of English Conversation, Stenstrom shows the many conversation strategies with real world examples.

In 2002, she published Trends in Teenage Talk: Corpus compilation, analysis, and findings. The book provides an in-depth look at the Corpus of London Teenage Language, or COLT, and its conclusions on current slang.

In 2006, she published "Taboo words in teenage talk," which utilized two separate spontaneous conversation corpora out of London and Madrid. It compared the spoken language of teenage conversation out of the two cities, concluding that, while London teenagers had a higher frequency of taboo word usage, Madrid teenagers had a higher frequency of sexual word usage.

In 2008, she published "A matter of politeness? A contrastive study of phatic talk in teenage conversation," using Leech's Phatic Maxis.im to discuss phatic expressions in Spanish and English youth as a form of politeness. The difference between Spanish and English teenagers is that Spanish teenagers use vocatives while English teenager give minimal feedback signals.

In 2009, she published "Pragmatic markers in contrast: Spanish pues nada and English anyway," comparing the usage of the two different pragmatic markers and how they function.

In 2014, she published "Your mum! 'Teenagers’ swearing by mother in English, Spanish and Norwegian" from the International Journal of Corpus Linguistics, comparing teenagers' usage of mother or mom in swearing. The corpora used were the COLT, COLAm, and UNO-Oslo. Spanish had the highest usage of these kinds of swearing as there is more stigma since Spain is a catholic country.

In 2020, she wrote a chapter for the book Voices Past and Present - Studies of Involved, Speech-related and Spoken Texts, "From yes to innit: Origin, development and general characteristics of pragmatic markers". She uses four different corpora (COLT, MLE, BNC Old, and BNC2014) to compare the pragmatic marker innit with yes, yeah and okay as well as show the development of the many markers.

In 2023, she published "Corpus-pragmatic perspectives on the contemporary weakening of fuck: The case of teenage British English" focusing on the evolution of the word fuck with two different corpora of British English teenagers. It discusses how the usage is becoming more common and less stigmatized as the word is losing its more abusive meaning.

== Other publications ==
- Stenström, Anna-Brita 1998. "From Sentence to Discourse". In Discourse Markers: Descriptions and theory, Jucker, Andreas H. and Yael Ziv (eds.)
- Stenström, Anna-Brita. 2003. "It’s not that I really care about him personally you know". In Discourse Constructions of Youth Identities, Androutsopoulos, Jannis K. and Alexandra Georgakopoulou (eds.)
- Karin Aijmer and Anna-Brita Stenström, eds. 2004. Discourse Patterns in Spoken and Written Corpora (Pragmatics & Beyond New Series) John Benjamins.
- Anna-Brita Stenström and Annette Myre Jørgensen, eds. 2009. Youngspeak in a Multilingual Perspective (Pragmatics & Beyond New Series) John Benjamins.
