= Lancaster-Oslo-Bergen Corpus =

1970s collection of British English texts

The Lancaster-Oslo/Bergen (LOB) Corpus is a one-million-word collection of British English texts which was compiled in the 1970s in collaboration between the University of Lancaster, the University of Oslo, and the Norwegian Computing Centre for the Humanities, Bergen, to provide a British counterpart to the Brown Corpus compiled by Henry Kučera and W. Nelson Francis for American English in the 1960s.

Its composition was designed to match the original Brown corpus in terms of its size and genres as closely as possible using documents published in the UK in 1961 by British authors. Both corpora consist of 500 samples each comprising about 2000 words in the following genres:

Label	Text category	Brown Corpus	LOB Corpus
A	Press: reportage	44	44
B	Press: editorial	27	27
C	Press: reviews	17	17
D	Religion	17	17
E	Skills, trades and hobbies	36	38
F	Popular lore	48	44
G	Belles lettres, biography, essays	75	77
H	Miscellaneous (documents, reports, etc.)	30	30
J	Learned and scientific writings	80	80
K	General fiction	29	29
L	Mystery and detective fiction	24	24
M	Science fiction	6	6
N	Adventure and western fiction	29	29
P	Romance and love story	29	29
R	Humour	9	9
	Total	500	500

The chief compilers of the LOB corpus were Geoffrey Leech (Lancaster University) and Stig Johansson (University of Oslo); see Leech & Johansson (2009).

The corpus has been also tagged, i.e. part-of-speech categories have been assigned to every word.
