= Loring Coes =

American politician

Hon. Loring Coes
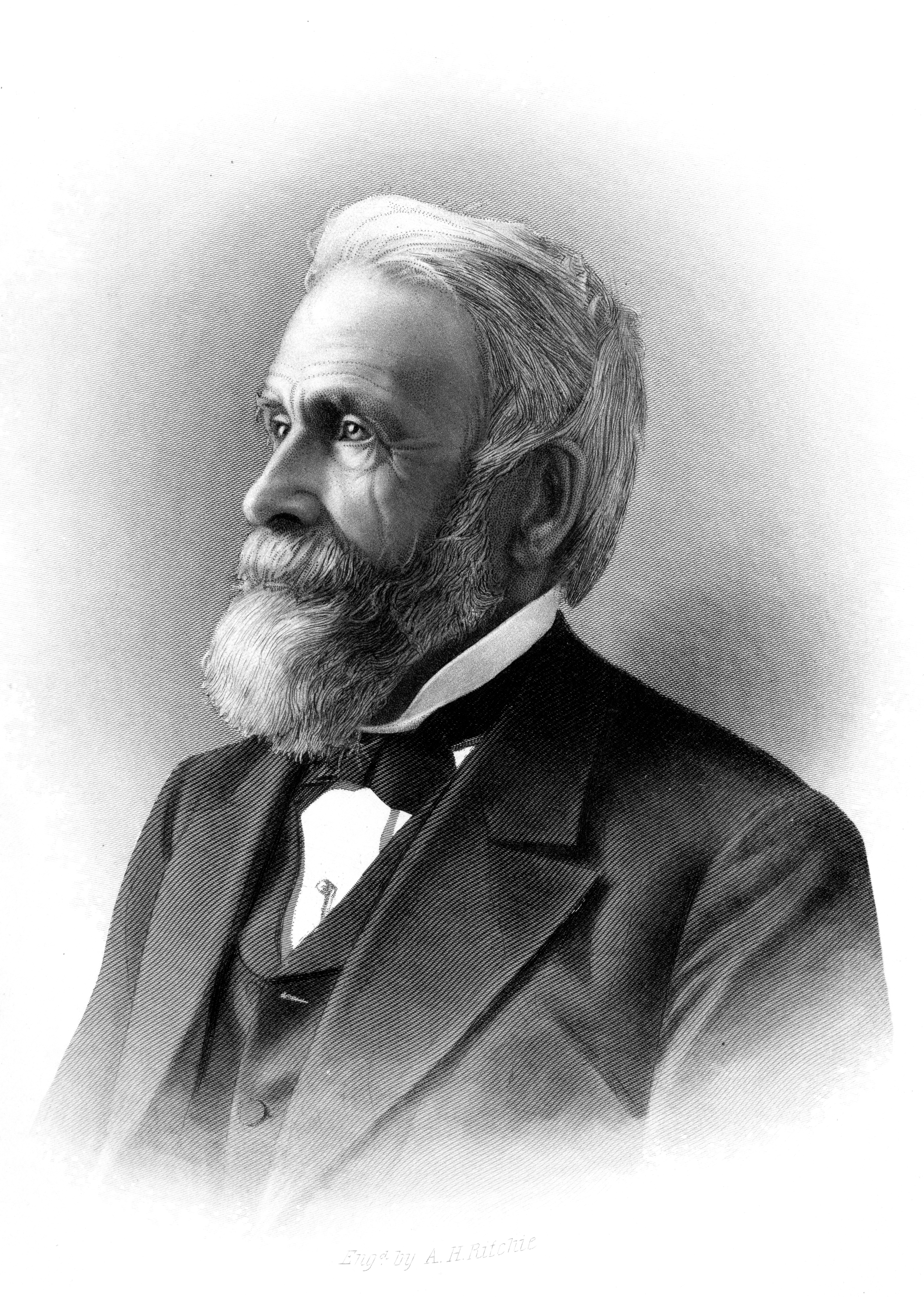

Member of the Worcester, Massachusetts Board of Aldermen

Member of the Worcester, Massachusetts Common Council

Member of the Massachusetts House of Representatives
- In office 1864–1865

Personal details
- Born: April 22, 1812 Worcester, Massachusetts
- Died: July 13, 1906 (aged 94) Worcester, Massachusetts
- Resting place: Hope Cemetery, Worcester, Massachusetts
- Party: Republican
- Spouse: Harriet Newell Read
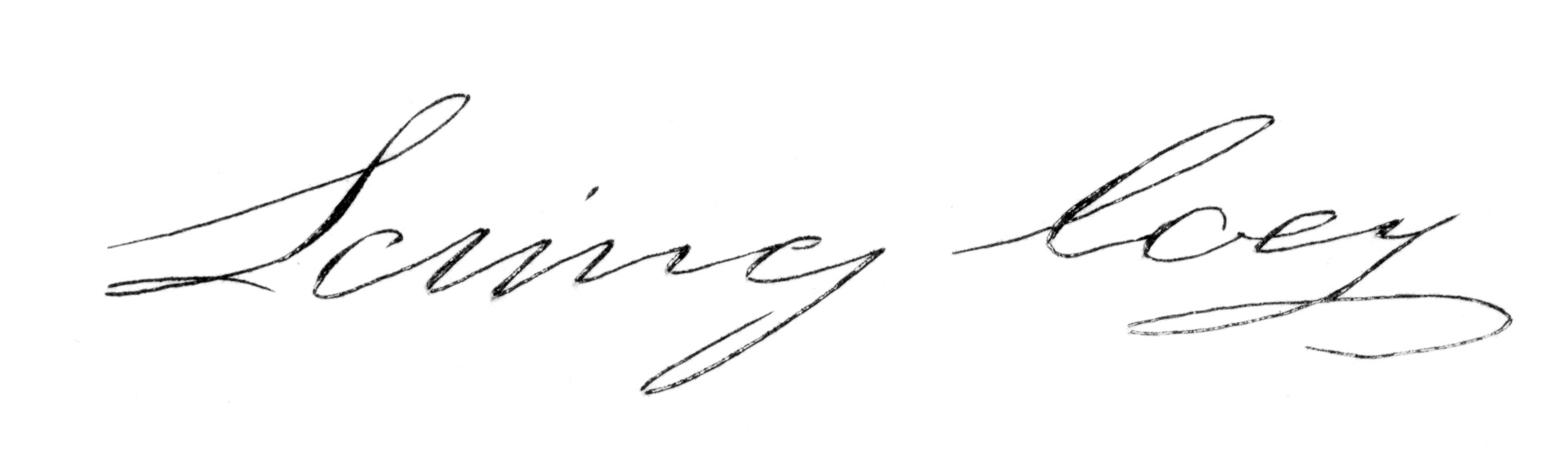
- Signature

Loring Coes (April 22, 1812 – July 13, 1906) was an American inventor, industrialist and Republican politician who invented the screw type wrench, commonly known as the monkey wrench and who served as a member of the Worcester, Massachusetts City Council and Board of Aldermen, and as a member of the Massachusetts House of Representatives in 1864–1865.

== Early life ==
Coes was born in Worcester, Massachusetts on April 22, 1812.

== Family life ==
On January 14, 1835, Loring married Harriet Neal Read of Attleboro, Massachusetts.

== Invention of the screw wrench ==
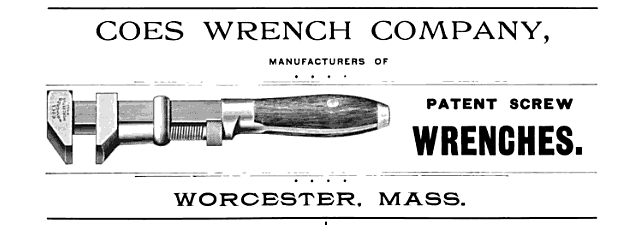
Advertisement for the Coes Wrench Company published in the January 1901 issue of The Worcester Magazine

Coes and his brother Aury Gates Coes worked for the firm of Kimball and Fuller, a company that made machinery for the woolen industry. In 1836 the Coes brothers purchased the business, and formed the L. & A. G. Coes Company as a partnership. In October 1839 the facility where they worked was destroyed by a fire. The Coes brothers were unable to continue in businesses so they moved to Springfield, Massachusetts to work as pattern makers in the foundry of Laurin Trask. It was while they were living and working in Springfield that Loring Coes invented the screw wrench commonly known as the monkey wrench. Previous to the invention of the Screw Wrench, previously the wrenches of the time, the two common wrenches of the time the English patent wrench; and the Merrisk wrench, also known as the Springfield wrench, needed two hands to adjust, the new screw wrench could be used and adjusted with one hand.

The Coes brothers sold their pattern for spinning machines that they had rescued from the fire that destroyed their plant, and used the money to pay for the patent on the Screw Wrench that Loring Coes was granted on April 16, 1841.

== L. & A. G. Coes ==
After they were granted the patent, the brothers' company L. & A. G. Coes went back into operation and they began to manufacture their new wrench.

== Death ==
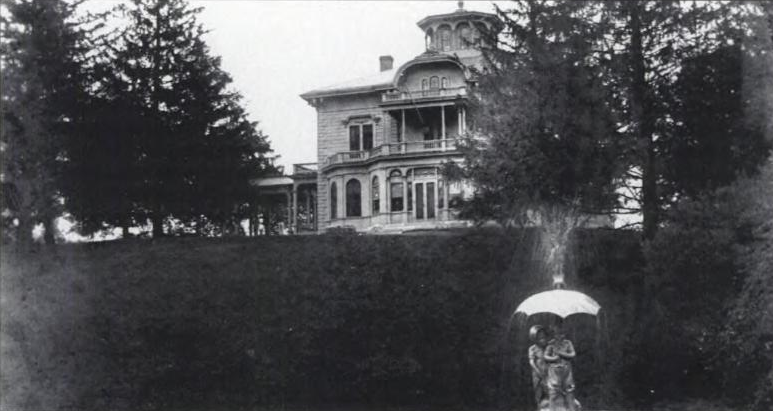
Loring Coes' mansion 1049 Main St Worcester MA

Coes died at his Worcester, Massachusetts home on July 13, 1906.
