= Theodore T. Ellis =

American inventor and publisher

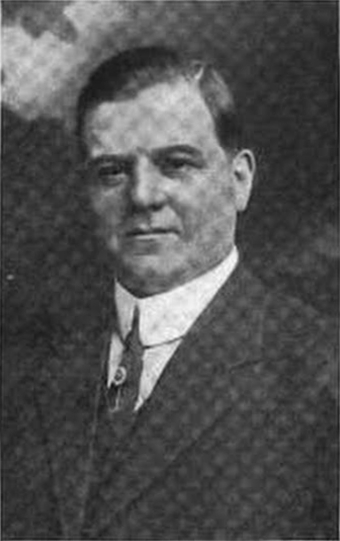
- Born: April 25, 1867; St. Louis, Missouri, US
- Died: January 6, 1934 (aged 66); London, UK
- Occupation(s): Inventor, publisher

Theodore Thaddeus Ellis (April 25, 1867 – January 6, 1934) was an American inventor and publisher.

He was born in St. Louis to John and Mary Bentley Ellis. He began working in the newspaper industry in his teens as a press room apprentice, becoming a pressman in 1886. The next year he enlisted in the Navy, where he stayed for three years, spending most of that time in the Far East. When he returned to the US he worked for the Brockton Enterprise in Massachusetts and the Boston Herald, and in 1900 became press room foreman for The Worcester Telegram.

In 1905 he began working on inventions to improve printing press operations. The publisher of the Telegram, Austin P. Cristy, insisted that he either resign or stop dividing his time between his work and his inventing. Ellis resigned, and made enough money from his inventions to purchase the Worcester Telegram from Cristy in 1919 for $1,000,000.

His inventions included several press blankets, which he founded the New England Fibre Blanket Company to manufacture; they were distributed through the New England Newspaper Supply Company, which he ran. He also became a textile manufacturer, and founded the New England Woolen Fabric Company. He was chairman of the Royal Worcester Corset Company. At one time he served as the president of the New England Daily Newspaper Association.

In about 1912 he married Mary Griffin in Spencer, Massachusetts; they had no children.

In 1920 he acquired The Worcester Evening Gazette from George F. Booth, and combined the two papers into Worcester Telegram-Gazette, selling the combined paper, along with The Sunday Telegram, in 1925 to a group including Booth, for about $2,000,000.

He remained an honorary member of the International Printing Pressmen's Union, despite becoming a publisher, and gave $100,000 in 1928 to the union's widows and orphans fund.

In August 1931, Ellis and Frank Knox jointly bought control of the Chicago Daily News. Knox became the publisher, and Ellis was vice president.

Ellis was an art collector; his collection included the Northbrook Madonna, at that time thought to be by Raphael, painted in about 1505. He bought it from the Earl of Northbrook in 1928. He was a director of the Worcester Art Museum.

In 1928 he bought Knollwood, a large estate near Worcester, now in the National Register of Historic Places.

Ellis kept a herd of prize cattle, and in 1931 one of his Guernsey cows, "Green Meadow Lustre", broke the record for the most milk and butterfat produced in a single year by a cow between three-and-a-half and four years of age.

Ellis died of a heart attack on January 6, 1934, while in London.
