= Wellington Corpus of Spoken New Zealand English =

The Wellington Corpus of Spoken New Zealand English is a one-million-word corpus of transcribed English compiled from materials collected between 1988 and 1994, which is made up of excerpts from a range of speakers who have lived in New Zealand since before the age of 10. The corpus was collected under the direction of linguist Janet Holmes and includes broadcast transcripts as well as informal conversations, telephone conversations, lectures, and oral history interviews.

The corpus, which was distributed as part of the 1999 ICAME CD-ROM, has been used for a number of academic studies including those looking at morphology, pronoun use and language contact studies, as of the influence of Māori on New Zealand English.
