= Everett F. Merrill =

American businessman (1898–1955)

Worcester, Massachusetts City Manager
- In office 1950–1951
- Preceded by: Position created
- Succeeded by: Francis J. McGrath

Personal details
- Born: October 15, 1898 Campton, New Hampshire, U.S.
- Died: April 27, 1955 (aged 56) New York City, U.S.
- Resting place: Hope Cemetery; Worcester, Massachusetts, U.S.
- Party: Republican

Everett Frank Merrill (October 15, 1898 – April 27, 1955) was an American industrialist who served as president of Merrill & Usher Co. and was the first city manager of Worcester, Massachusetts.

== Early life ==
Merrill was born October 15, 1898, in Campton, New Hampshire, to Frank E. and Gertrude (Little) Merrill. After graduating from Plymouth High School in 1916, Merrill moved to Boston, where he worked in the wholesale shoe business. He got his start in the steel industry with Arthur C. Harvey Co., a wholesale steel warehouse in Allston. He then worked for the Wheelock-Lovejoy Co., which worked in specialty steels. In 1919 he joined the Lackawanna Steel Company as a mill inspector. On November 22, 1919, he married Dorothy Rush. They had one daughter. In 1920 he returned to Boston with the Avery & Saul Co.

== Merrill & Usher Co. ==
In 1922, Meriil formed the Everett F. Merrill Co. and opened a wholesale steel warehouse in Worcester, Massachusetts. The following year, Joseph M. Usher bought into the business and the name was changed to Merrill & Usher Co. Merrill would serve as the company's president until his death. Merrill & Usher grew to be one of the largest steel and aluminium supply businesses in New England.

== Civic involvement ==
In 1950, Merrill was appointed the first city manager of Worcester. He served in that position for over a year. In 1953 he was named a part time economic consultant to governor Christian Herter. On April 27, 1955, Merrill died at Memorial Hospital in New York City. He was buried in Hope Cemetery in Worcester.
