= Knollwood (Worcester, Massachusetts) =

Historic district in Massachusetts, United States

- U.S. National Register of Historic Places
- U.S. Historic district
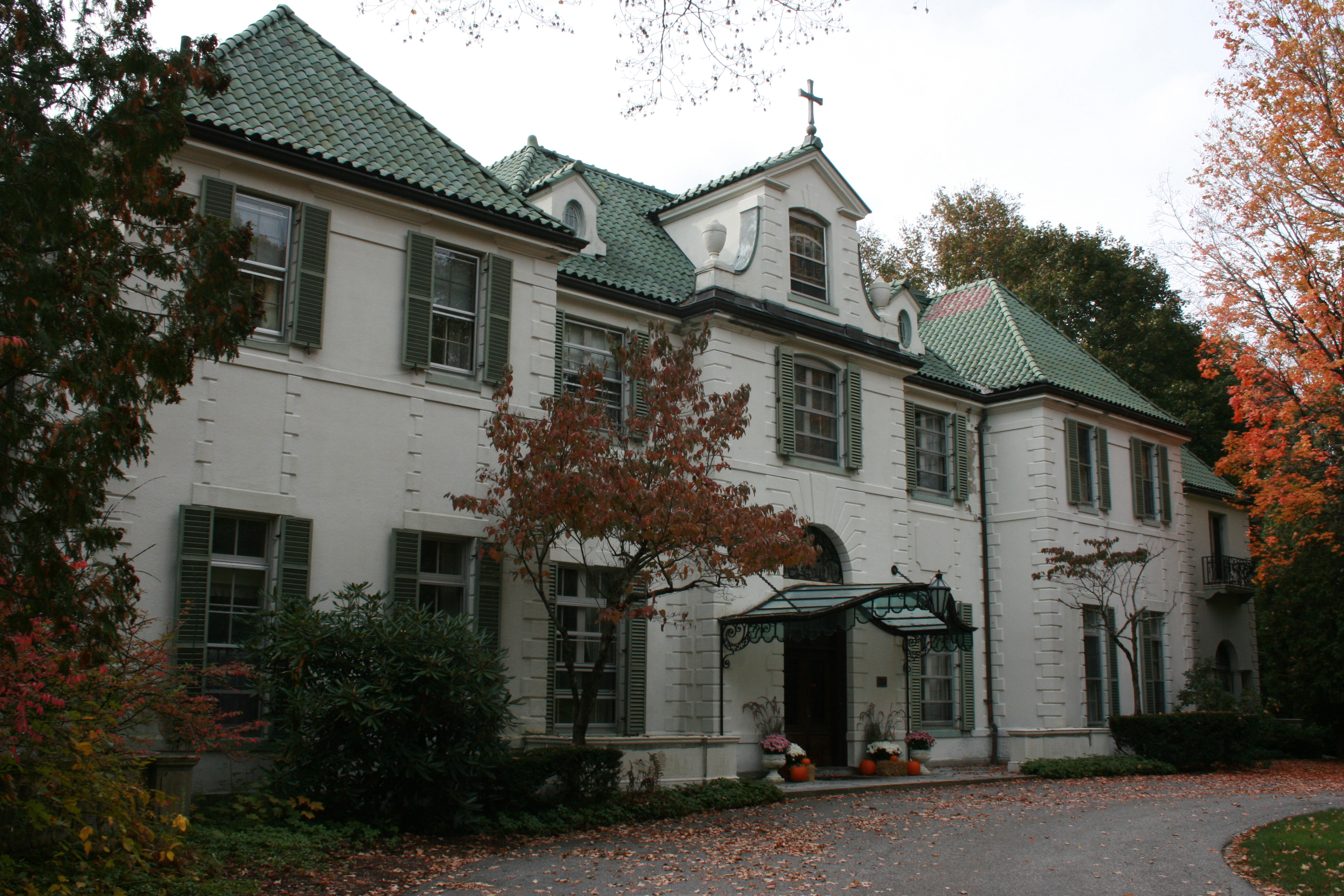

- Location within Massachusetts Location within the United States
- Location: 425 Salisbury St., Worcester, Massachusetts
- Coordinates: 42°17′1″N 71°49′34″W
- Area: 15 acres (6.1 ha)
- Built: 1914
- Architect: Little & Browne
- Architectural style: 17th and 18th century French
- MPS: Worcester MRA
- NRHP reference No.: 80000520
- Added to NRHP: March 05, 1980

Knollwood is an historic estate at 425 Salisbury Street in Worcester, Massachusetts. Originally encompassing about 122 acres (49 ha), the estate has been reduced to only 15 acres (6.1 ha), and is now home to the Notre Dame Academy. The estate was listed on the National Register of Historic Places in 1980. It is one of the city's grandest surviving early 20th-century estates.

Knollwood was built in the 1910s for industrialist Lyman Gordon (1861-1914), cofounder of Wyman-Gordon, although he died before it was completed. The main house is a 2 1/2-story stucco construction, topped by a complex hipped tile roof. Its basic form is that of a central block with slightly asymmetrical flanking wings. The central portion has a slightly recessed pavilion that rises a full three stories to a decorated gable. The eastern flanking wing housed kitchen facilities, while the west wing end features a Palladian window on the first floor which leads out to a terrace. The approach to the house is along an imposing tree-lined allée. The estate includes several outbuildings, also built c. 1914, which are styled similarly to the main house. Among them area caretaker's house, carriage house or garage, and servants' quarters.

Following Gordon's death, the estate was purchased in 1917 by Lucius J. Knowles, president of Crompton and Knowles, and in 1928 by Theodore Ellis, another local company owner and art collector. After Ellis' death much of the original estate was subdivided. The remnant portion of the estate has been home to the private all-girl Notre Dame Academy since the 1950s.

== See also ==
- National Register of Historic Places listings in northwestern Worcester, Massachusetts
- National Register of Historic Places listings in Worcester County, Massachusetts
