= Notre Dame Academy (Worcester, Massachusetts) =

Girls school in Worcester, Massachusetts, United States

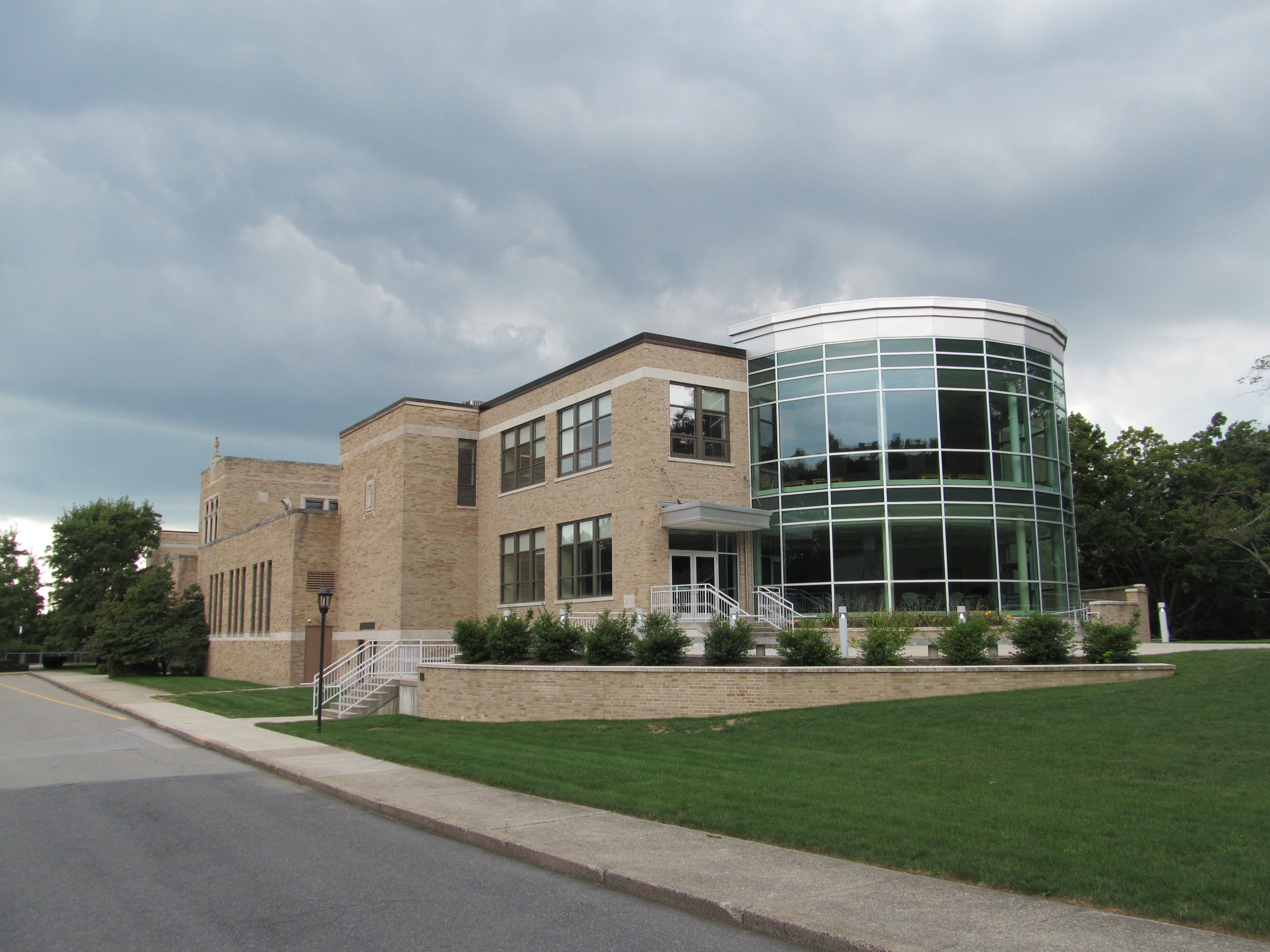
- View of Notre Dame Academy in 2012.

Location
- 425 Salisbury Street; Worcester, Massachusetts 01609; United States
- Coordinates: 42°17′0″N 71°49′34″W

Information
- Type: Private, all-girls, college-preparatory
- Religious affiliation: Roman Catholic
- Established: 1951
- Founders: Sisters of Notre Dame de Namur
- Principal: Marilyn Tencza
- Grades: 7–12
- Colors: Green and gold
- Athletics conference: Central Massachusetts Athletic Conference
- Team name: Rebels
- Accreditation: NEASC
- Newspaper: Academian
- Yearbook: Evergreen
- Website: www.nda-worc.org

Notre Dame Academy is a private, all-girls, college-preparatory Catholic school in Worcester, Massachusetts. The school is operated by the Sisters of Notre Dame de Namur, and is the only all-girls, college-preparatory school in Central Massachusetts.

== History ==
In 1950, the Sisters of Notre Dame de Namur were asked by the Roman Catholic Diocese of Worcester to establish an all-girls academy in Worcester. A year later, Notre Dame Academy was established within the Knollwood site.

== Tuition ==
Tuition for the 2025-2026 academic year is $18,605 for the high school, and $14,885 for grades 7-8.

== Notable alumni ==
- Jennifer Callahan, politician

== See also ==
- List of girls' schools in the United States
- List of high schools in Massachusetts
