= Coes Wrench Company =

American tool manufacturing company

- Industry: Manufacturing
- Founded: April 1, 1888
- Headquarters: 1 Coes Square, Worcester, Massachusetts
- Key people: Loring Coes
- Products: Screw wrenches

Coes Wrench Company was a tool manufacturing company based in Worcester, Massachusetts. The company was originally part of the L. and A. G. Coes & Co.

The Coes Wrench Company was founded April 1, 1888.

Coes Wrench Company manufactured the screw type wrench invented by Loring Coes; this wrench is commonly known as a monkey wrench.

== Early company history ==
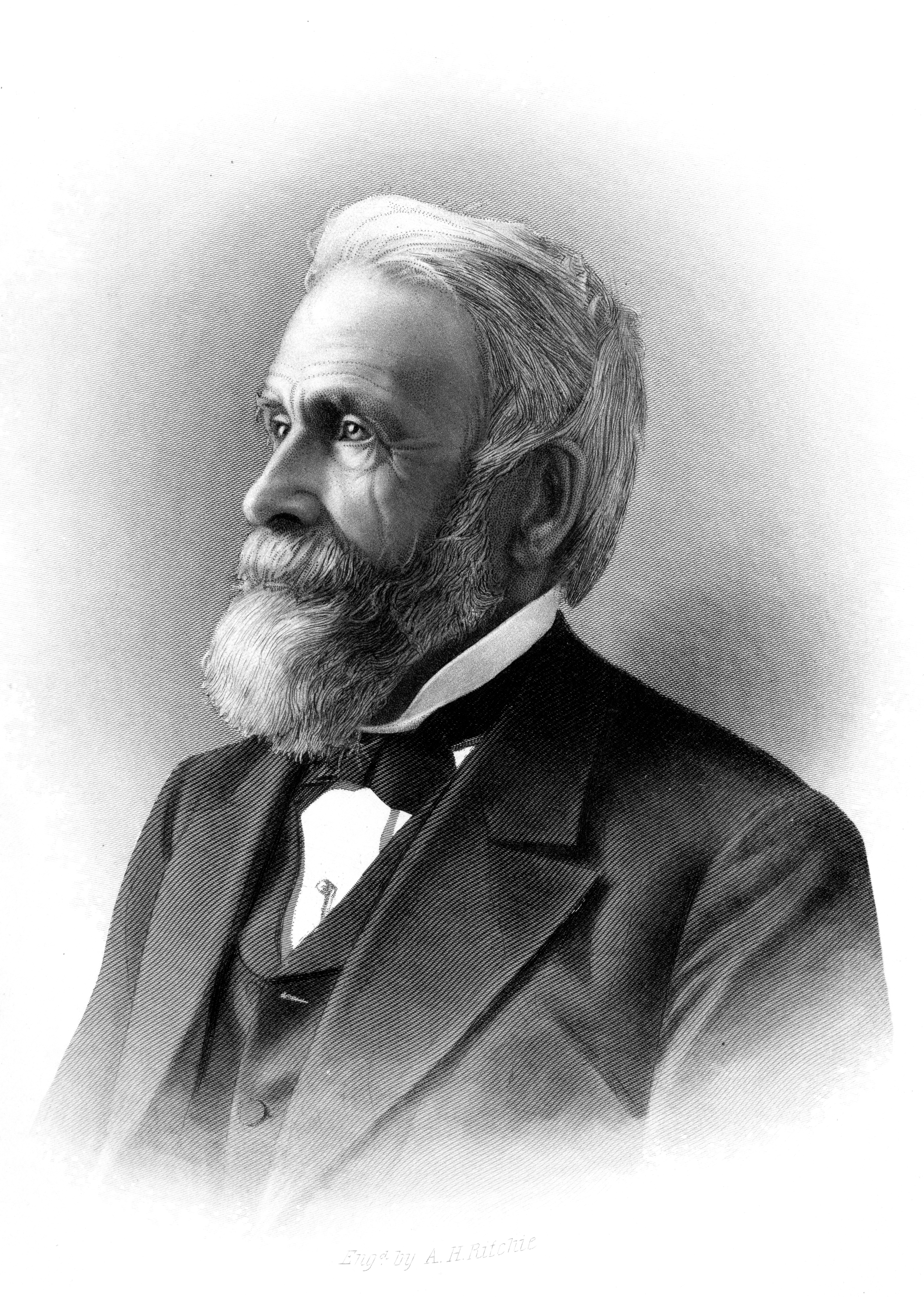
Loring Coes

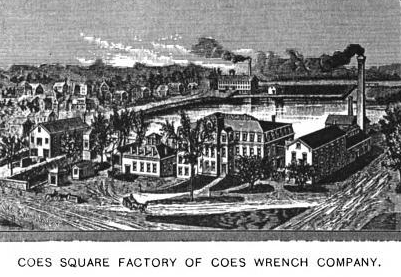
Coes Wrench Co., 1 Coes Square Worcester, Massachusetts, 1898

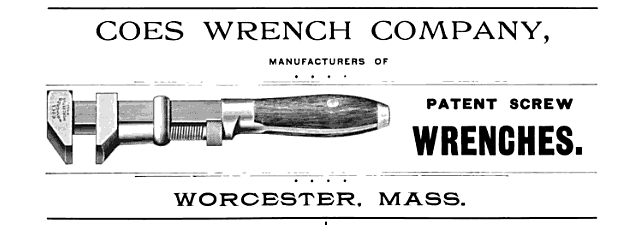
Advertisement for the Coes Wrench Company published in the January 1901 issue of The Worcester Magazine

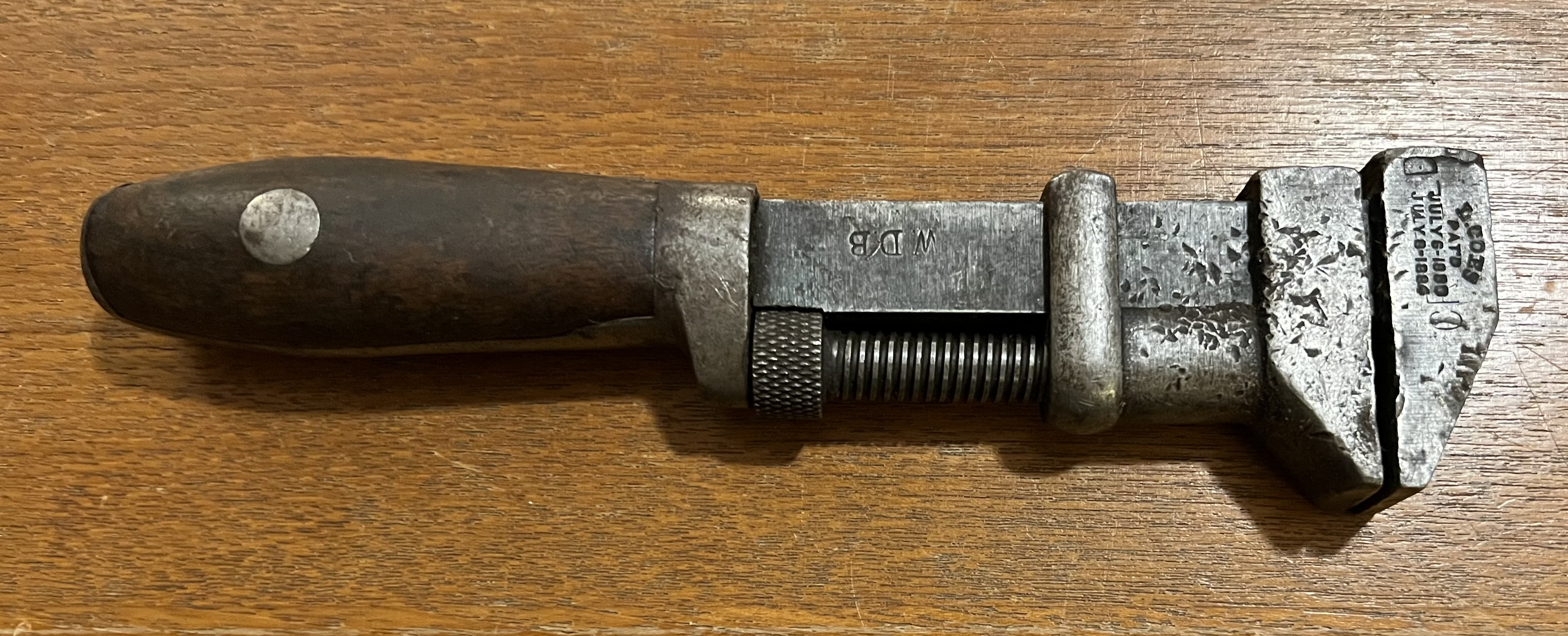
Coes monkey wrench. US patents July 6, 1880 and July 8, 1884

Coes and his brother Aury Gates Coes worked for the firm of Kimball and Fuller, a firm that made machinery for the woolen industry. In 1836 the Coes brothers purchased the business and formed the L. & A. G. Coes company as a partnership. In October 1839 the facility where they worked was destroyed by a fire. The Coes brothers were unable to continue in businesses so they moved to Springfield, Massachusetts to work as pattern makers in the foundry of Laurin Trask.

== Invention of the screw wrench ==
It was while they were living and working in Springfield that Loring Coes invented the screw wrench commonly known as the monkey wrench. Prior to the invention of the screw wrench, the two common wrenches of the time, the English patent wrench and the Merrick wrench (also known as the Springfield wrench), needed two hands to adjust, whereas the new screw wrench could be used and adjusted with one hand.

The Coes brothers sold their pattern for spinning machines that they had rescued from the fire that destroyed their plant, and used the money to pay for the patent on the screw wrench that Loring Coes was granted on April 16, 1841.

== L. & A. G. Coes ==
After they were granted the patent for the screw wrench, the brothers company L. & A. G. Coes went back into operation and they began to manufacture their new wrench.

== Merger ==
In 1888 Coes Wrench Company was merged with the Loring Coes & Company.

== See also ==
- List of defunct consumer brands
