= Charles H. Pinkham =

American Civil War Medal of Honor recipient

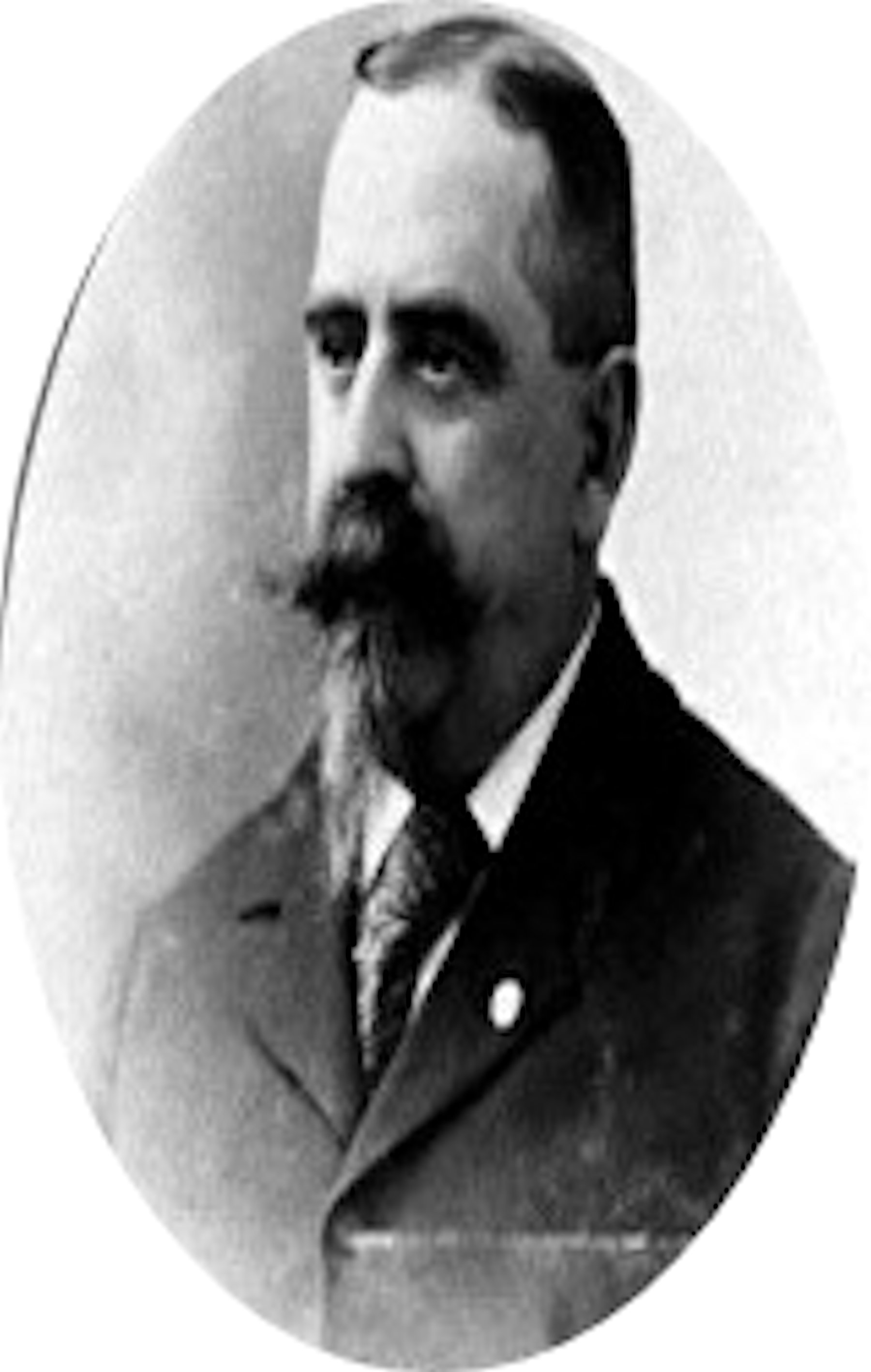
- Pinkham, c. 1880
- Born: 1844; Grafton, Massachusetts
- Died: 1920 (aged 75–76)
- Burial place: Hope Cemetery, Worcester, Massachusetts
- Military career
- Allegiance: (United States) United States; Union
- Branch: United States Army; Union Army
- Service years: 1863 - 1865
- Rank: Sergeant Major; Brevet Captain
- Unit: 57th Massachusetts Infantry
- Conflicts: American Civil War • Battle of Fort Stedman
- Awards: Medal of Honor

Charles H. Pinkham (18 August 1844 – 6 November 1920) was born in Grafton, Massachusetts in 1844. In 1895, President Grover Cleveland presented him with the Medal of Honor for his service in the American Civil War. He is buried in Hope Cemetery, Worcester, Massachusetts.

Pinkham joined the army from Worcester, Massachusetts in December 1863, and was mustered out as a brevet captain in July 1865.

He had been a sergeant major with the 57th Massachusetts Infantry, and was "among the soldiers who stormed Fort Stedman during the Battle of Petersburg in March 1865." His official Medal of Honor citation reads: "Captured the flag of the 57th North Carolina Infantry (C.S.A.) and saved his own colors by tearing them from the staff while the enemy was in the camp."
