= W. Nelson Francis =

American linguist (1910–2002)

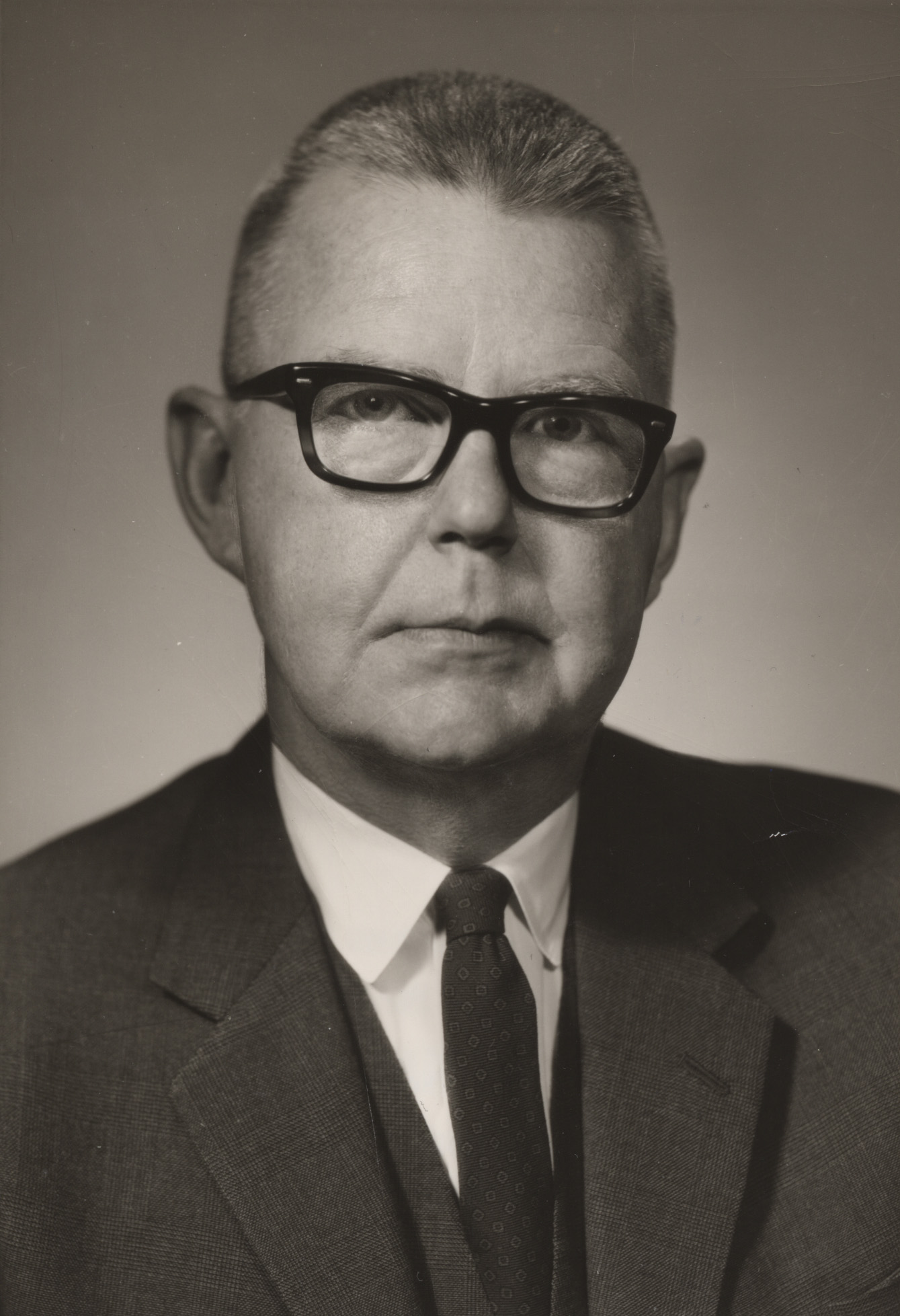
- Born: Winthrop Nelson Francis; October 23, 1910; Philadelphia, Pennsylvania, U.S.
- Died: June 14, 2002 (aged 91); Providence, Rhode Island, U.S.
- Resting place: Lowell Cemetery, Lowell, Massachusetts
- Education: Harvard University; University of Pennsylvania (Ph.D.)
- Occupations: Writer, professor, linguist
- Spouse(s): Anne Funkhouser; Nearlene Burkley
- Children: 3
- Writing career
- Genres: Nonfiction; reference
- Subject: Linguistics
- Notable work: Brown Corpus

W. Nelson Francis (October 23, 1910 – June 14, 2002) was an American author, linguist, and university professor. He served as a member of the faculties of Franklin & Marshall College and Brown University, where he specialized in English and corpus linguistics. He is known for his work compiling a text collection entitled the Brown University Standard Corpus of Present-Day American English, which he completed with Henry Kučera.

== Early life ==
Winthrop Nelson Francis was born on October 23, 1910, in Philadelphia, Pennsylvania. Both of his parents were from New England. His mother was raised in Calais, Maine. His mother attended Wellesley College and taught public school in Boston, before marrying Francis' father and moving to Philadelphia. His father, Joseph Sidney Francis, was a mathematician and engineer. Francis grew up in the Germantown area of Philadelphia, where he attended the Charles W. Henry Public School and Penn Charter School.

He earned an undergraduate degree in 1931 from Harvard University, where he majored in Literature, focusing on the study of English, Greek, Latin, and French. He later attended the University of Pennsylvania, where he earned his Ph.D. in English in 1937. His doctoral thesis presented a 14th-century Middle English text, edited by him with an extensive introduction about the textual editing. In 1939, professor and Middle English scholar Carleton Brown read his dissertation and took it to England and presented it to Mabel Day of the Early English Text Society. In 1942, the manuscript was published by the Oxford University Press.

== Professional background ==
=== Academics ===
Following his graduation from the University of Pennsylvania, Francis joined the faculty of Franklin & Marshall College, where he taught English. In 1957, he headed a faculty committee, which re-evaluated the college's curriculum. The following year, he was named chair of the English department. His first book, The Structure of American English, was published in 1958. His scholarly work on varieties of English additionally included compiling, writing, and editing an edition of the 14th-century Book of Vices and Virtues for the Early English Text Society. He was honored with a Fulbright Research Fellowship and conducted field research in Norfolk, England, between 1956 and 1957 for the Survey of English Dialects, which was being compiled at the University of Leeds.

In 1962, he joined the faculty of Brown University as a professor of Linguistics and English. In 1964, he began working on a joint language project of Brown University and Tougaloo College, which lasted through 1968. The project applied linguistic principles in a syllabus of Standard American English for African-American freshmen at Tougaloo College. After the project was completed, he became the chair of the linguistics department, serving in that capacity through 1976. While he officially retired at that time with the title of Emeritus Professor, he continued to teach historical and comparative linguistics and advise students. In 1987, he was appointed chair of Brown's newly established Department of Cognitive and Linguistic Sciences. He taught his last course at Brown in 1990.

=== Writing ===
Brown Corpus

After joining the faculty of Brown, Francis took a course in computational linguistics from Henry Kučera, who taught as a member of the Slavic Department staff. In the early 1960s, they began collaborating on compiling a one-million-word computerized cross-section of American English, which was entitled the Brown Standard Corpus of Present-Day American English, but commonly known as the Brown Corpus. The work was compiled between 1963 and 1964, using books, magazines, newspapers, and other edited sources of informative and imaginative prose published in 1961. Once completed, the Brown Corpus was published in 1964. Each word in the corpus is tagged with its part of speech and the subject matter category of its source. Disseminated throughout the world, the Brown Corpus has served as a model for similar projects in other languages and as the basis for numerous scholarly studies, including Francis and Kučera's Frequency Analysis of English Usage, which was published in 1967.

Magazine and journal contributions

Francis wrote articles that were published in American Speech, College Composition and Communication, College English, Computers and the Humanities, Contemporary Psychology, East Anglian Magazine, English Journal, The Explicator, Language, Language in Society, Lingua, Modern Language Notes, PMLA, The Quarterly Journal of Speech, Speculum, Style, and Word.

=== Business ===
In 1977, Francis cofounded the International Computer Archive of Modern and Medieval English (ICAME) at the University of Oslo. The organization became the distributor of the Brown Corpus. Corporate publications entitled ICAME News and ICAME Journal have been dedicated to him twice. In 1986, the newsletter recognized his work on an individual basis, while ten years later, the journal published "A Tribute to W. Nelson Francis and Henry Kučera".

=== Speaking ===
Francis served as a keynote speaker, lecturer, and visiting professor in London; Edinburgh; Cairo; Tokyo; and Trondheim, Norway. He also participated in a Nobel Symposium on computer corpus linguistics in Stockholm.

== Board memberships ==
- Save the Bay – Member
- National Association for the Advancement of Colored People (NAACP) – Member
- Urban League of Rhode Island – Member
- Providence Shakespearean Society – President from 1986 to 1990

== Published works ==
=== Books ===
- Editor, The Book of Vices and Virtues: A Fourteenth Century Translation of the 'Somme le Roi' of Lorens d'Orléans (Early English Text Society #217)(Oxford, UK: Oxford University Press, 1942)
- The Structure of American English (with a chapter on American English dialects by Raven I. McDavid, Jr)(New York: Ronald Press, 1958)
- The History of English (New York: W.W. Norton, 1963)
- The English Language: An Introduction (New York: W.W. Norton, 1963, 1965) LCCN 63-15500 (no ISBN)
- Compositional Analysis of Present-Day American English (with Henry Kučera)(Providence: Brown University Press, 1967)
- Frequency Analysis of English Usage: Lexicon and Grammar (with Henry Kučera)(Boston: Houghton Mifflin, 1982) ISBN 0-395-32250-2
- Dialectology: An Introduction (London & New York: Longman, 1983) ISBN 9780582291171

=== Other ===
- A Standard Corpus of Present-Day Edited American English, for Use with Digital Computers (with Henry Kučera; computer database) (Providence: Brown University Department of Linguistics, 1964; tagged version, 1969)
- "Modal DAREN'T and DURSTN'T in Dialectal English," in Studies in Honour of Harold Orton, ed. by Stanley Ellis (Leeds, UK: Leeds University Press, 1970)
- "The English Language and Its History," in Webster's New Collegiate Dictionary, 8th edn. (Springfield, MA: G. & C. Merriam, 1973)
- "Problems of Assembling and Computerizing Large Corpora," in Empirische Textwissenschaft: Aufbau und Auswertung von Text-Corpora, ed. by Henning *Bergenholtz & Burkhard Schaeder (Königsberg: Scriptor, 1979)
- "Dinner speech given at the 5th ICAME Conference at Windermere, England, 21 May 1984", in ICAME News No. 10 (May 1986)
- "Otto Jesperson as Grammarian," in Otto Jesperson: Facets of His Life and Work, ed. by Arne Juul & Hans F. Nielsen (Amsterdam & Philadelphia: John Benjamins, 1989)
- "Dialectology," in Oxford International Encyclopedia of Linguistics, ed. by William Bright. (London: Oxford University Press, 1991)
- "Language Corpora B.C.," in Directions in Corpus Linguistics: Proceedings of Nobel Symposium 82. Stockholm, 4–8 August 1991, ed. by Jan Svartvik. (Berlin & New York: Mouton de Gruyter, 1991)
- "The Historical and Cultural Interpretation of Dialect," in American Dialect Research, ed. by Dennis R. Preston (Amsterdam & Philadelphia: John Benjamins, 1993)
- "A Pilgrim's Progress: From Philology to Linguistics," in First Person Singular III: Autobiographies by North American Scholars in the Language Sciences, edited by E.F.K. Koerner (Amsterdam & Philadelphia: John Benjamins, 1998)
