= Samuel Winslow =

American politician (1862–1940)

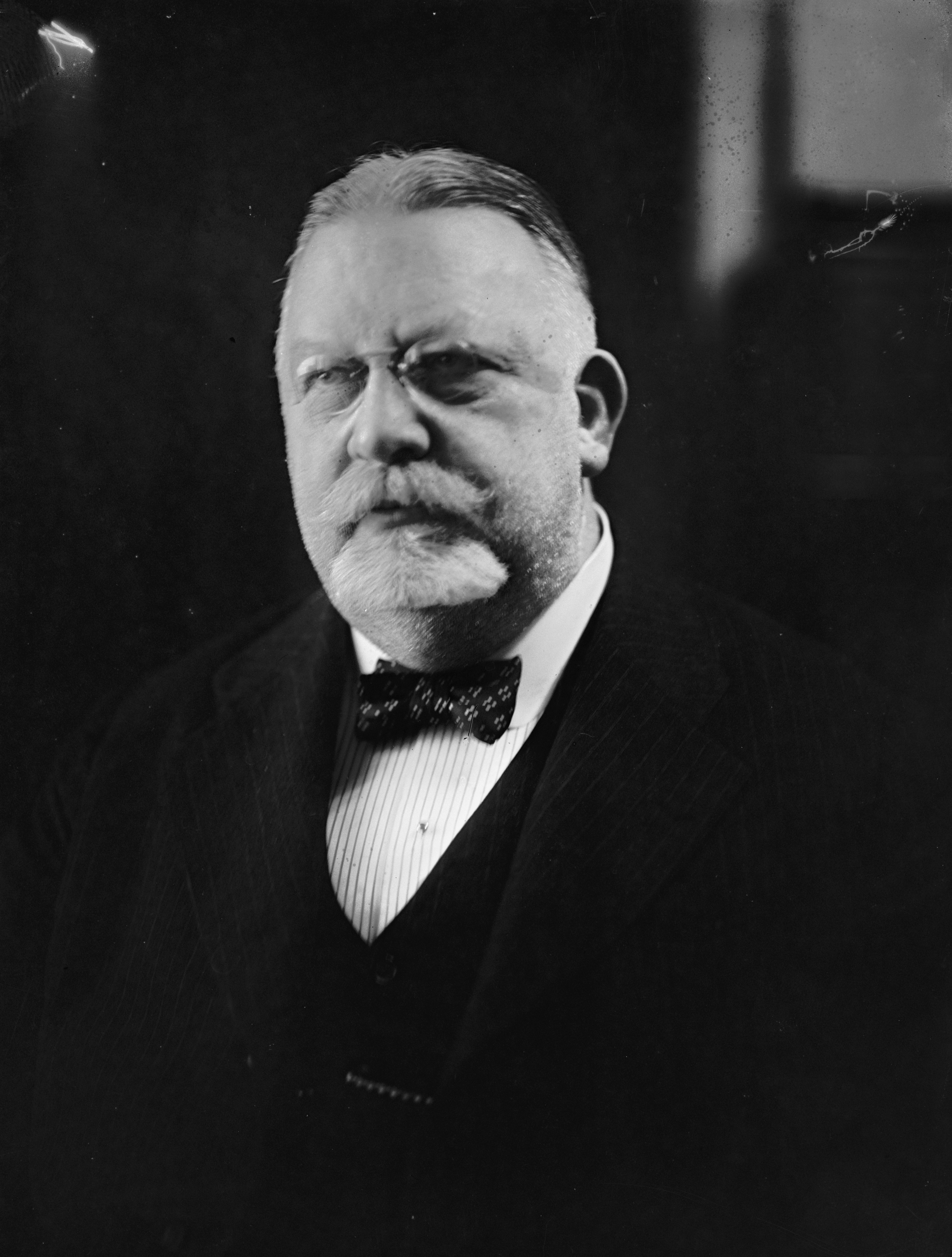
- Winslow, 1921–1922

Member of the U.S. House of Representatives from Massachusetts's 4th district
- In office March 4, 1913 – March 3, 1925
- Preceded by: William Wilder
- Succeeded by: George R. Stobbs

Chairperson of the Massachusetts Republican Party
- In office 1893–1895
- Preceded by: Eben S. Draper
- Succeeded by: George H. Lyman

Personal details
- Born: April 11, 1862 Worcester, Massachusetts, U.S.
- Died: July 11, 1940 (aged 78) Worcester, Massachusetts, U.S.
- Resting place: Hope Cemetery
- Party: Republican
- Education: Harvard

Samuel Ellsworth Winslow (April 11, 1862 – July 11, 1940) was an American politician and Republican Congressman from Massachusetts.

== Biography ==
Winslow was born in Worcester, Massachusetts. He spent a year at the Williston Seminary in Easthampton before entering Harvard College in 1881. Winslow graduated from Harvard University in 1885, where he was a member of Delta Kappa Epsilon fraternity and served on the Harvard Lampoon staff. At Harvard, Winslow also was the theatrical manager for the Hasty Pudding Club. Sam captained and coached the 1884–85 Harvard baseball team which accrued a record of 27–1, defeating Yale twice, and compiling a .306 team hitting average while winning the Intercollegiate Base Ball Association championship. Winslow both pitched and played outfield. During the summer of 1884, he pitched briefly for the Barnstable town team in what is now the Cape Cod Baseball League. Winslow's childhood friend and Harvard classmate Ernest Thayer often mentioned Sam when talking about his inspiration for "Casey at the Bat", which Thayer authored in 1888 as a contributor to the San Francisco Examiner.

Winslow was appointed as a colonel on the staff of Governor John Q. A. Brackett in 1890. He was chairman of the Republican city committee of Worcester from 1890 to 1892, and became chairman of the Republican State committee in 1893. He was delegate to the Republican National Convention in 1908. He was elected as a Republican to the Sixty-third Congress, and to the five succeeding Congresses. Winslow's father Samuel, a manufacturer of skates, had served as mayor of Worcester from 1886 to 1889.

Winslow was the chairman in the Committee on Interstate and Foreign Commerce during the Sixty-seventh and Sixty-eighth Congresses. He was appointed by Calvin Coolidge in 1926 as a member of the United States Board of Mediation, for the disposition of disputes between carriers and their employees. He was chosen chairman, and served until 1934.

Winslow died at City Hospital in Worcester on July 11, 1940. He was cremated and his ashes were buried in Hope Cemetery.

U.S. House of Representatives
Preceded by William Wilder	Member of the U.S. House of Representatives from Massachusetts's 4th congressional district March 4, 1913 – March 3, 1925	Succeeded by George R. Stobbs
