= Samuel Winslow (mayor) =

American politician

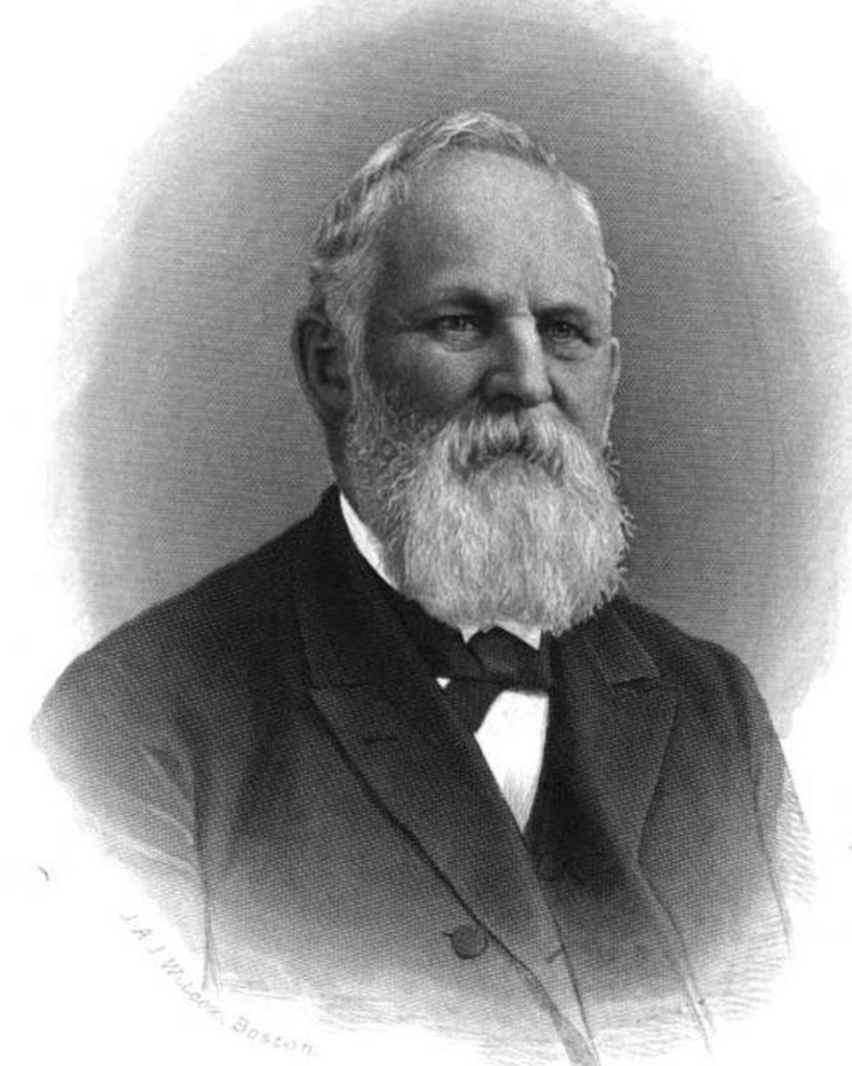

26th Mayor of Worcester, Massachusetts
- In office January 4, 1886 – January 6, 1890
- Preceded by: Charles G. Reed
- Succeeded by: Francis A. Harrington

Personal details
- Born: February 28, 1827 Newton, Massachusetts
- Died: October 21, 1894 (aged 67) Worcester, Massachusetts
- Resting place: Hope Cemetery; Worcester, Massachusetts

Samuel Winslow (1827-1894) was an American politician who served as 26th Mayor of Worcester, Massachusetts, from 1886 to 1889.

== Early life and career ==
Winslow was born in Newton, Massachusetts, on February 28, 1827. He received his early education in the school of Newton. Upon leaving school, he was employed in the manufacture of cotton machinery, in which he showed so much inventive skill that he was made foreman in his shop at the age of twenty. He came to Worcester in 1855 and formed a co-partnership with his brother. In 1857 they began the manufacture of skates. After his brother's death Winslow continued the business until the formation of the Samuel Winslow Skate Manufacturing Company in 1886.

Winslow was a member of the Common Council of Worcester in 1864-65. In 1885, he was elected mayor of Worcester, and was re-elected two times. He was both vice president and later president of the Worcester County Mechanic's Association.

Winslow died in Worcester on October 21, 1894 He was buried in Hope Cemetery.
