= Thomas Plunkett =

American Civil War Medal of Honor recipient

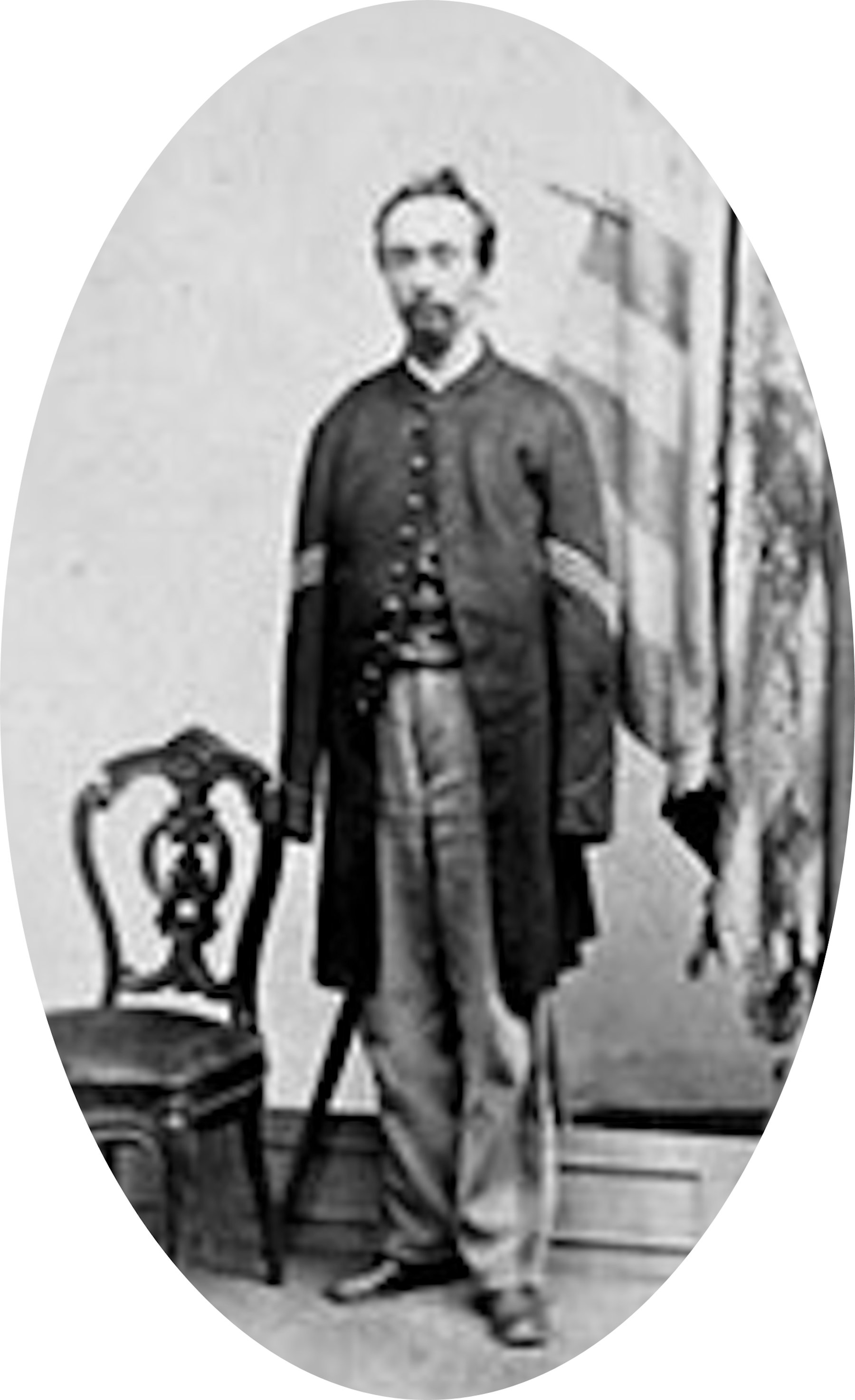
- Plunkett in 1865
- Born: 1841; County Mayo, Ireland
- Died: March 10, 1885 (aged 43–44); Worcester, Massachusetts, US
- Burial place: Hope Cemetery
- Military career
- Allegiance: United States
- Branch: United States Army
- Service years: 1861 - 1864
- Rank: Sergeant
- Units: Company E, 21st Massachusetts Infantry
- Conflicts: American Civil War: Battle of Fredericksburg (WIA)
- Awards: Medal of Honor

Thomas Plunkett (1841 - March 10, 1885) was a color bearer during the American Civil War. He carried the banner of the 21st Regiment Massachusetts Volunteer Infantry at the Battle of Fredericksburg when a cannon blast took away both of his arms and wounded him in the chest. He pressed the flag against his chest with what remained of his arms and continued until one of the color guards took the flag from him so he could retire. His arms were eventually amputated, and he would take another two years to recover. Plunkett received the Medal of Honor for his actions during the battle. Battery Plunkett, a battery of two 4-inch rapid-firing guns at Fort Warren on Georges Island in Boston Harbor (MA), was completed in 1899 and named in his honor.

== Medal of Honor citation ==

Rank and Organization:

Sergeant, Company E, 21st Massachusetts Infantry. Place and date. At Fredericksburg, Va., 11 December 1862. Entered service at: West Boylston, Mass. Birth: Ireland. Date of issue: 30 March 1866.

Citation:

Seized the colors of his regiment, the color bearer having been shot down, and bore them to the front where both his arms were carried off by a shell.

== See also ==
- List of Medal of Honor recipients
- List of American Civil War Medal of Honor recipients: M–P
