= Monkey wrench =

Type of adjustable wrench

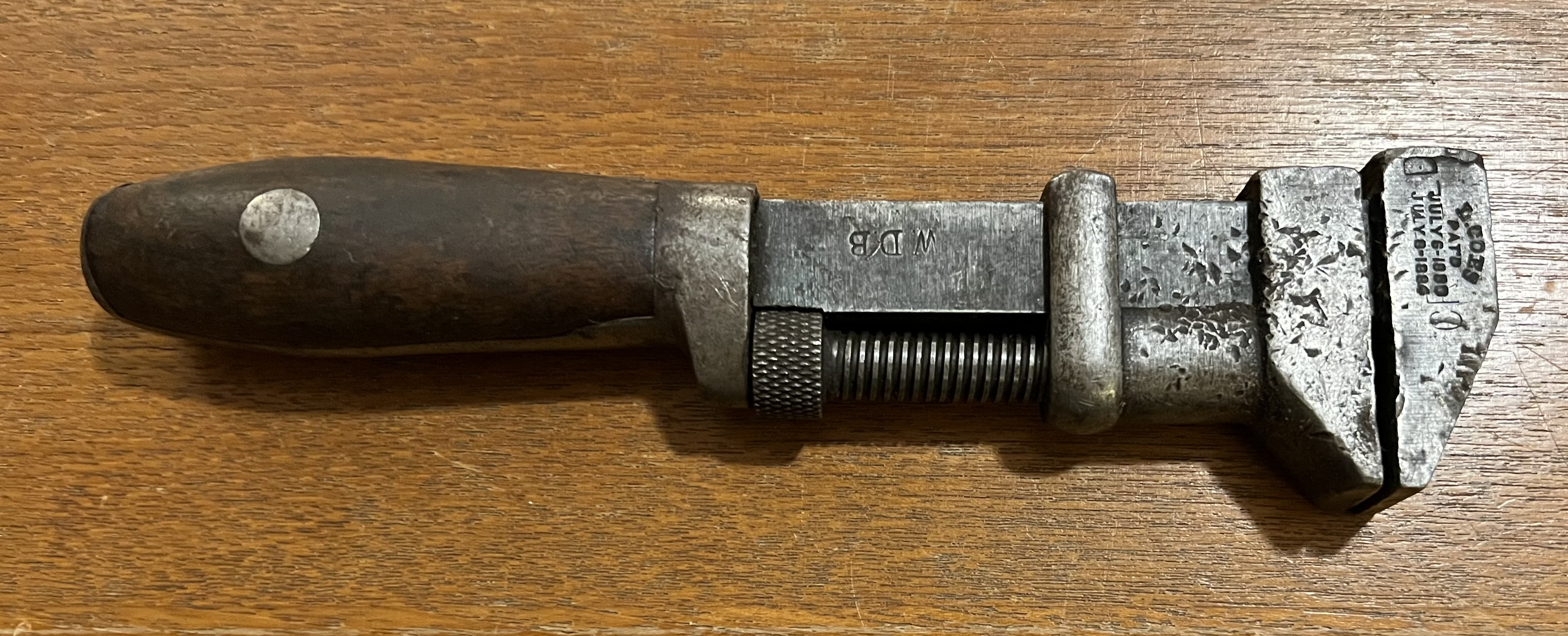
Coes monkey wrench. US patents July 6, 1880 and July 8, 1884

A monkey wrench is a type of smooth-jawed adjustable wrench, a 19th century American refinement of 18th-century English coach wrenches. It was widely used in the 19th and early 20th century. It is of interest as an antique among tool collectors and is still occasionally used in practice.

More broadly, a monkey wrench may be a pipe wrench or any other kind of adjustable wrench.

== Etymology and history ==
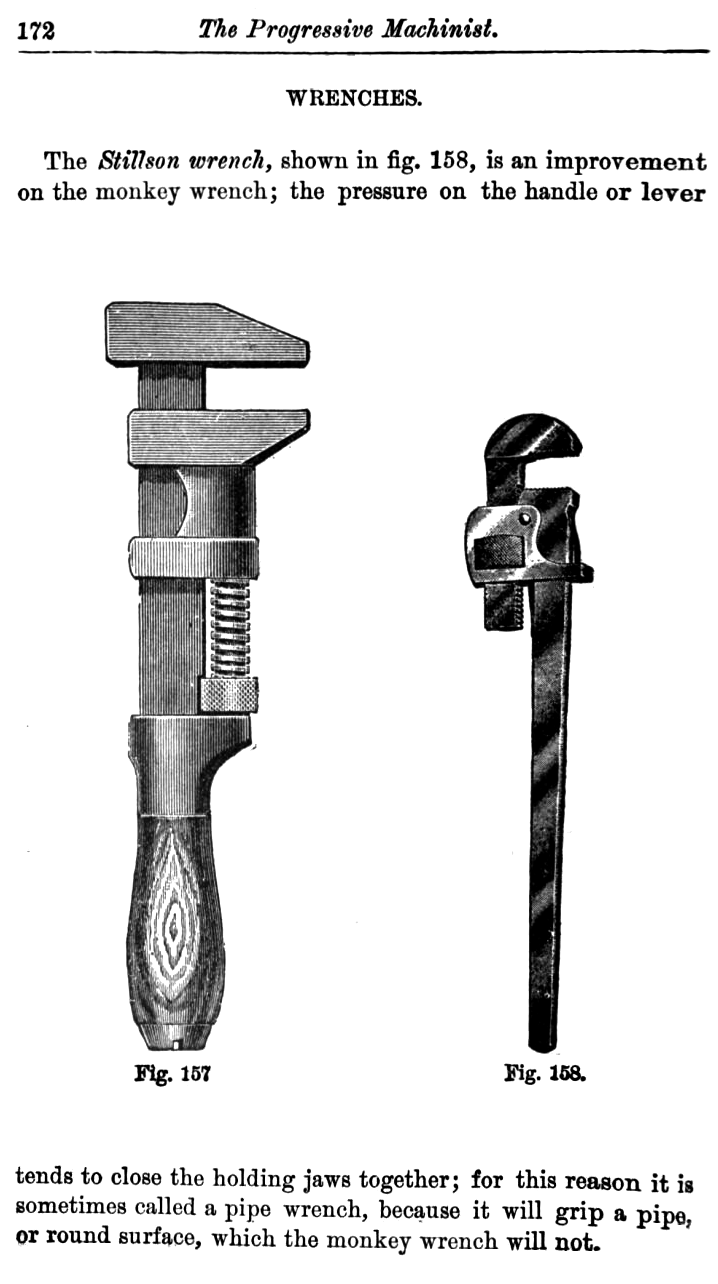
Monkey wrench (left) compared to Stillson or pipe wrench (right)

Adjustable coach wrenches for the odd-sized nuts of wagon wheels were manufactured in England and exported to North America in the late 18th and early 19th centuries. They were set either by sliding a wedge, or later by twisting the handle, which turned a screw, narrowing or widening the jaws. In 1840, Loring Coes, a knife manufacturer in Worcester, Massachusetts, invented a screw-based coach wrench design in which the jaw width was set with a spinning ring fixed under the sliding lower jaw, above the handle. This was patented in 1841 and the tools were advertised and sold in the United States as monkey wrenches, a term which was already in use for the English handle-set coach wrenches. Published reports from 1834 and 1840 show the term in use (and indicating by the absence of explanatory glosses that the term was not unfamiliar).

The origin of the name is not entirely clear, but Geesin (2015) reports that it originated in Britain with a fancied resemblance of the wrench's jaws to that of a monkey's face, and that the many convoluted folk etymologies that later developed were baseless. Before the Bahco/Johansson/Crescent type became widespread in the United States, during the industrial era of the 1860s to the 1910s, various monkey wrench types were the dominant form of adjustable wrench there. During that era, a very wide and popular range of monkey wrenches was manufactured by Coes family partnerships, licensees and companies, which filed further wrench patents throughout the 19th century.

Some Coes wrenches could be bought with wooden knife handles, recalling the company's earlier knives. In 1909, the Coes Wrench Company advertised a six-foot-long "key" wrench, shaped like a monkey wrench, for use on railroads. The Coes wrench designs were acquired by the toolmaker Bemis & Call of Springfield, Massachusetts, in 1928. After 1939, its successor companies manufactured monkey wrenches from Coes designs until the mid-1960s, a production run of over 120 years.

In the German language, the wrench is called "Engländer", which means "Englishman", while in French, it is called "clé anglaise" (English wrench). It is thought to be called so because it was useful for the less common imperial ("English") screws and nuts in continental Europe when only metric open-end or ring wrenches were available.

Monkey wrenches are still manufactured and are used for some heavy tasks, but they have otherwise been mostly replaced by the shifting adjustable wrench/spanner, which is much lighter and has a smaller head, allowing it to fit more easily into tight spaces, and the tooth-jawed, torque-gripping pipe wrench.

== False etymologies ==
=== Charles Moncky myth ===
The following story was widespread from the late 19th and early 20th centuries:

That handy tool, the "monkey-wrench", is not so named because it is a handy thing to monkey with, or for any kindred reason. "Monkey" is not its name at all, Charles Moncky, the inventor of it, sold his patent for $5000, and invested the money in a house in Williamsburg, Kings County, where he now lives.

Although this story was refuted by historical and patent research in the late 19th century, it appears to have been inspired by a real person. A Charles Monk (not Moncky) lived in the Williamsburg section of Brooklyn in the 1880s where he made and sold moulder's tools, not mechanics' tools like a monkey wrench. He could not have invented or named the monkey wrench because he was born after the term first appeared in print.

=== Racial slur myth ===
A story on social media claims that the African-American boxer Jack Johnson invented the wrench while in prison, and the wrench was named "monkey wrench" as a racial slur. However, both the first patent for a monkey wrench and the name predate Johnson's birth. Johnson did, however, receive a patent for improvements to it.

== Culture ==
The largely US idiom "to throw a monkey wrench into (something)" means to sabotage something, equivalent to the British English "to throw a spanner in the works". A "left handed monkey wrench" is sometimes used as ironic humor, as monkey wrenches are ambidextrous.

Characters in video games, animation, and other media often wield monkey wrenches or stylized wrench-like implements as weapons to signal their role as a mechanic, engineer, or similar field. Cpl. Adrian Shephard, protagonist of Gearbox and Valve's Half-Life: Opposing Force, wields a monkey wrench as his primary melee weapon. Similarly, the Engineer class in Team Fortress 2, also published by Valve, uses a monkey wrench as his base melee weapon.

American rock band Foo Fighters released the song "Monkey Wrench" in 1997 as the lead single to their second album The Colour and the Shape.

== See also ==
- Adjustable spanner/wrench
- Pipe wrench or Stillson wrench
- Plumber wrench
- The Monkey Wrench Gang
