= Henry Kučera =

Czech-American linguist (1925–2010)

- Born: Jindřich Kučera; 15 February 1925; Třebařov, Czechoslovakia
- Died: 20 February 2010 (aged 85); Providence, Rhode Island, United States
- Education: Charles University, Harvard University (Ph.D.), Brown University (full professor)
- Occupation: Linguist
- Known for: Brown Corpus
- Scientific career
- Fields: Linguistics

Henry Kučera (15 February 1925 – 20 February 2010), born Jindřich Kučera (Czech pronunciation: [ˈjɪndr̝ɪx ˈkutʃɛra]), was a Czech-American linguist who pioneered corpus linguistics, linguistic software, a major contributor to the American Heritage Dictionary, and a pioneer in the development of spell checking computer software. He is remembered in particular as one of the initiators of the Brown Corpus.

== Early life and education ==
Kučera was born in Třebařov (between Pardubice and Olomouc) in Czechoslovakia and later moved with his family to Hodonín, where he studied. When the Communists came to power in February 1948, his studies in philosophy and linguistics at Charles University in the Czech capital of Prague were interrupted. He was forced to leave Czechoslovakia in April 1948 when it became clear that his political writings had placed him at risk of detention by the Communist authorities.

Kučera then moved to Allied-occupied Germany where he worked under the supervision of the U.S. CIC (Counterintelligence Corps) for refugee organizations, assisting Czech refugees with relocation programs and preparing passports. It was during this time that he met Pavel Tigrid, who went on to become Kučera's mentor and longtime friend. Following the Velvet Revolution in 1989, Tigrid went on to become the Minister of Culture for Czechoslovakia.

== Teaching career ==
In 1949, he traveled to New York City aboard the USS General C. H. Muir. After receiving his PhD from Harvard University, he taught at the University of Florida at Gainesville for two years. Kučera then returned to Harvard as a research fellow. In 1955 he received an appointment at Brown University, where he was promoted to full professor in 1965. He spent the rest of his teaching career there. He retired in 1990 as the Fred M. Seed Professor Emeritus of Linguistics and Cognitive Sciences with, among other honors, a black tie retirement party and the publication of a Festschrift about his accomplishments.

== Works ==
While at Brown, he was able to further pursue his interest in linguistics. There he became interested in the computational analysis of human language, though at the time there were scarcely any tools for this type of research.

In 1963 and 1964, Kučera collaborated with W. Nelson Francis to create the Brown Corpus of Standard American English, generally known as the Brown Corpus. This was a carefully compiled selection of current American English as published during the year 1961 in 1,000 sources on a wide variety of subjects. It has been very widely used in computational linguistics, and was for many years among the most-cited resources in the field. Kučera and Francis themselves subjected it to a variety of computational analyses from which derived their classic work Computational Analysis of Present-Day American English (1967), followed by Francis and Kučera's Frequency Analysis of English Usage: Lexicon and Grammar (1982).

Shortly thereafter, Boston publisher Houghton-Mifflin approached Kučera to supply a million word, three-line citation base for its new American Heritage Dictionary. This ground-breaking new dictionary, which first appeared in 1969, was the first dictionary to be compiled using corpus linguistics for word frequency and other information.

Kučera wrote one of the first spell checkers over Christmas break, 1981, in PL/I, at the behest of Digital Equipment Corporation. It was a simple, rapid spelling verifier. Further development resulted in "International Correct Spell", a spell checking program which was used on word processing systems such as WordStar and Microsoft Word as well as numerous small computer applications. Kučera later oversaw the development of Houghton-Mifflin's Correct Text grammar checker, which also drew heavily on statistical techniques for analysis. He founded Language Systems Incorporated (LSI), later Language Systems Software Incorporated (LSSI), to manage his software programs and updates until the patents expired in 2002. Houghton-Mifflin spun out Inso Corporation . With income largely from Microsoft and others licensing the spelling and grammar tools, in 1996 Inso acquired Electronic Book Technologies.

== Honors ==
In addition to his PhD in Linguistics from Harvard University, Kučera had a doctorate from Charles University in Prague which was restored after the Velvet Revolution ousted the communist rule in Czechoslovakia in 1989. He received honorary degrees from Pembroke College in Providence, RI, Bucknell University in Lewisburg, PA, and Masaryk University in Brno, Czech Republic (1990). Kučera was a member of the academic honor society Phi Beta Kappa.

== Selected publications ==
- H. Kučera (1961). The phonology of Czech.
- Andrew Mackie, Tatyana K. McAuley, Cynthia Simmons, eds. (1962). For Henry Kučera. Ann Arbor, MI: Michigan Slavic Publications.
- H. Kučera and W. N. Francis (1967). Computational Analysis of Present-Day American English.
- H. Kučera (1968). A Comparative Quantitative Phonology of Russian, Czech, and German.
- W. N. Francis and H. Kučera (1983). Frequency Analysis of English Usage: Lexicon and Grammar.
- W. N. Francis and H. Kučera (1989). Manual of information to accompany a standard corpus of present-day edited American English, for use with digital computers.
