= Bergen Corpus of London Teenage Language =

The Bergen Corpus of London Teenage Language (COLT) is a data set of samples of spoken English that was compiled in 1993 from tape recorded and transcribed conversations by teens between the ages of 13 and 17 in schools throughout London, England. This corpus, which has been tagged for part of speech using the CLAWS 6 tagset, is one of the linguistic research projects housed at the University of Bergen in Norway.

== Resultant research ==
Linguistic analysis based on COLT has appeared in the book Trends in Teenage Talk and subsequent journal articles, including, for example, work tracking innit, cos, degree modifiers, extenders, the use of taboo words, and negation.
