= John S. Sullivan =

American politician (1874–1949)

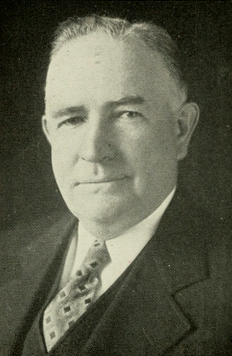
- Sullivan as a member of the Massachusetts Senate

Mayor of Worcester, Massachusetts
- In office 1936–1937
- Preceded by: William A. Bennett (acting)
- Succeeded by: William A. Bennett

Member of the Massachusetts Senate from the First Worcester district
- In office 1933–1936
- Preceded by: Christian Nelson
- Succeeded by: Joseph Patrick McCooey

Personal details
- Born: December 18, 1875 Thompsonville, Connecticut, U.S.
- Died: April 11, 1949 (aged 73) Worcester, Massachusetts, U.S.
- Party: Democratic

John Sylvester Sullivan (December 18, 1875 – April 11, 1949) was an American politician who was a member of the Massachusetts Senate from 1933 to 1936 and mayor of Worcester, Massachusetts from 1936 to 1937.

== Early life ==
Sullivan was born in Thompsonville, Connecticut on December 18, 1875 to John P. and Jane Е. (Grandfield) Sullivan. He attended grammar school in Thompsonville and worked as a paperboy and in a woolen mill. He moved to Worcester in 1895 and completed his education at the Worcester Evening High School.

== Business career ==
Sullivan entered the wholesale produce business with a brother and later established a fish business. He ran both of these until 1934. He also ran a news agency and served as a sales representative for Gately & Co. He spent his later years in the real estate and insurance business.

== Politics ==
Sullivan was elected to the Worcester board of aldermen in 1924. He served on the board for 7 years. He ran for mayor in 1931, but lost in the Democratic primary to John C. Mahoney. From 1933 to 1936, he represented the First Worcester district in the Massachusetts Senate.

Following the death of mayor Walter J. Cookson in 1936, Sullivan ran in the special election to fill the remainder of his term. Sullivan beat Mahoney to win the Democratic nomination and defeated Republican state representative Axel U. Sternlof 35,637 votes to 34,386.

Sullivan ran for a full term in 1937 and faced William A. Bennett. Sullivan was declared the winner by 25 votes, but Bennett asked for a recount, with both sides alleging ballot tampering. The recount found that Bennett had won by 96 votes. The Democrats challenged the results in the Massachusetts Supreme Judicial Court, which appointed Richard J. Lane to investigate the protested ballots. Sullivan obtained an injunction to remain in office until the election was decided. In March 1938, Lane issued a report that confirmed Bennett's victory by 80 or 92 votes, depending on the outcome of Sullivan's legal case over 12 disputed ballots. Justice Stanley Elroy Qua lifted the injunction on March 18, 1938 and the board of aldermen certified Bennett's victory. He was sworn in that day, but Sullivan refused to leave office, contending that he was the rightful mayor until his case was heard by the full bench of the Massachusetts Supreme Judicial Court. He agreed to turn over the office to Bennett the following day, but maintained that he had won the election. Sullivan's case was dismissed by the Supreme Judicial Court in August.

Sullivan ran for mayor again in 1939. He narrowly beat George A. Wells and John M. Shea in the Democratic primary and was handedly beat by Bennett 37,747 votes to 30,887.

Sullivan was the Democratic nominee for the United States House of Representatives seat in Massachusetts's 4th congressional district in the 1942 election. He lost to Republican incumbent Pehr G. Holmes 57% to 43%. In 1944, he sought the Democratic nomination for Lieutenant Governor of Massachusetts but finished runner up to John B. Carr in a four-way primary. Although Carr was the least known of the candidates, he had a similar name to his party's 1942 lieutenant gubernatorial nominee, John C. Carr.

== Death ==
Sullivan died on April 11, 1949 at Worcester City Hospital.
