= Statue of George Frisbie Hoar =

Statue in Worcester, Massachusetts, U.S.

George Frisbie Hoar statue
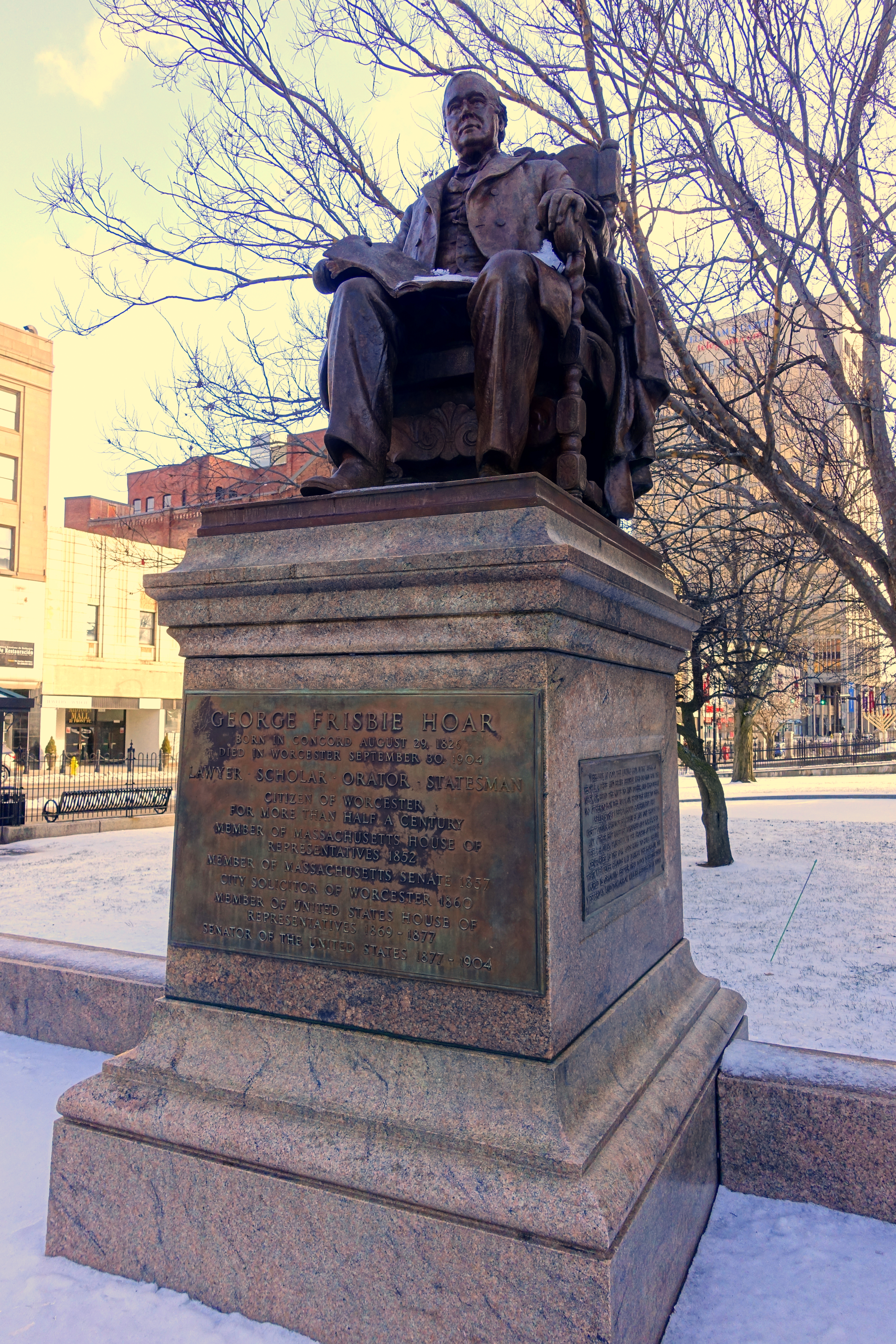
- George Frisbie Hoar statue (2020)
- Interactive map of George Frisbie Hoar statue
- Location: Worcester City Hall and Common, Worcester, Massachusetts, United States
- Coordinates: 42°15′46.6″N 71°48′07″W
- Designer: Daniel Chester French; Peabody and Stearns (pedestal)
- Builder: Norcross Brothers (pedestal)
- Type: Statue
- Material: Bronze; Granite
- Beginning date: 1907
- Completion date: 1908
- Dedicated date: June 26, 1908
- Dedicated to: George Frisbie Hoar

The George Frisbie Hoar statue is a public monument in Worcester, Massachusetts, United States. Located on the north side of the Worcester City Hall, the monument honors George Frisbie Hoar, a politician from the city. The monument, which consists of a statue designed by Daniel Chester French, was dedicated in 1908.

== History ==
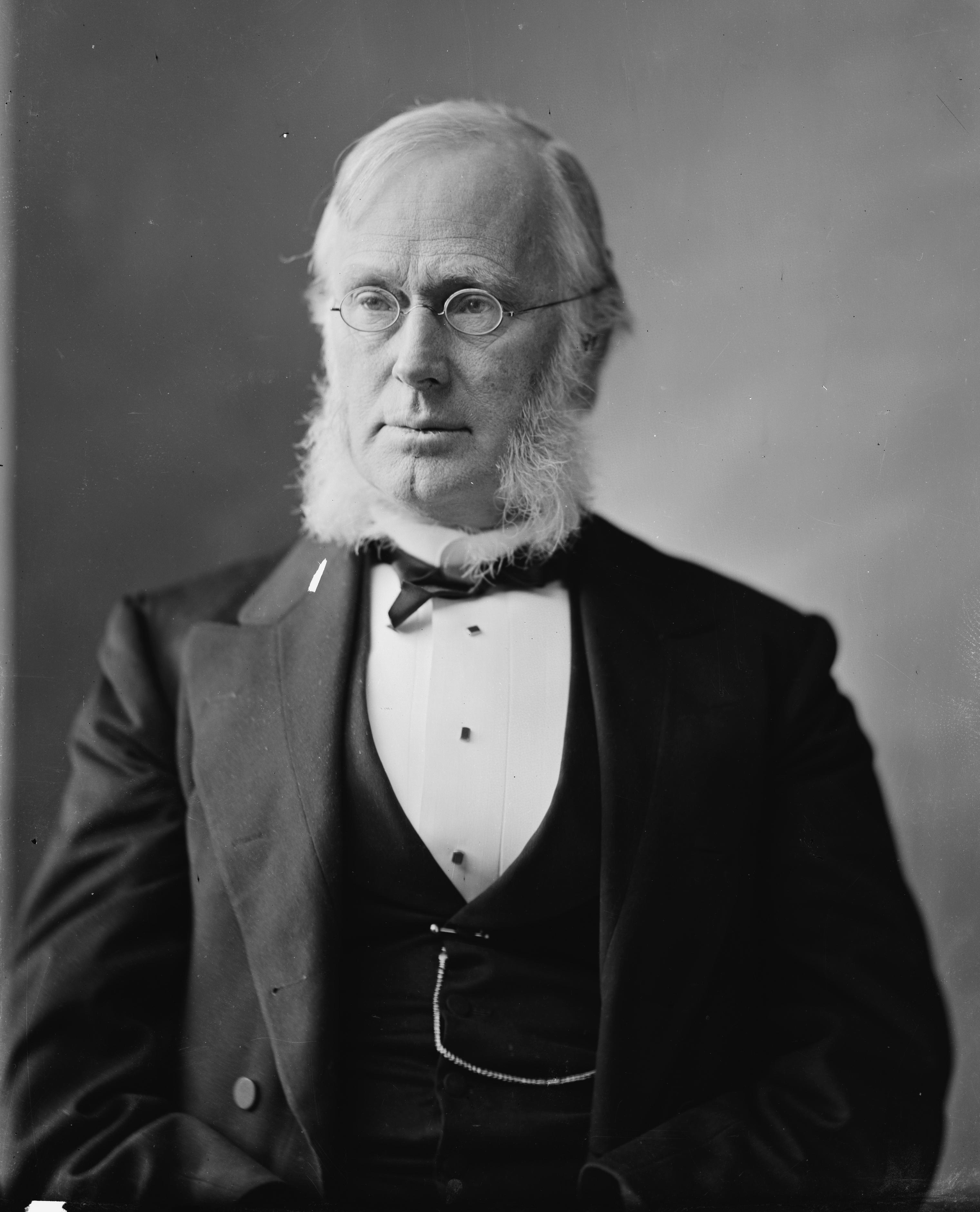
George Frisbie Hoar

George Frisbie Hoar was born in Concord, Massachusetts, United States, on August 29, 1826. As a child, he attended Concord Academy, and in 1842, at the age of 16, he entered into Harvard College, graduating four years later. In 1849, he graduated from Harvard Law School and was admitted to the bar that same year, following which he began to practice law in Worcester, Massachusetts. During the 1850s, he served terms in both the Massachusetts House of Representatives and the Massachusetts Senate, and from 1869 to 1877, he served in the United States House of Representatives as a member of the Republican Party. In 1877, he became a U.S. Senator, a position he would hold until his death in Worcester in 1904.

=== Creation and dedication ===
Following Hoar's death, on April 25, 1905, Worcester Mayor Walter H. Blodgett held a meeting at the city hall to discuss the creation of a memorial to Hoar. A memorial fund was created for this purpose, and on May 4, trustees of the fund were elected, with Blodgett as the fund's chairman. Fundraising through popular donations commenced, and within a few weeks, over 30,000 donors had contributed over $21,000 to the monument's creation. At a meeting held on July 20, sculptor Daniel Chester French was selected to design a statue of Hoar, with the pedestal to be designed by Peabody and Stearns and created by the Norcross Brothers. The location for the monument, the northern side of the Worcester City Hall, was selected by the trustees on January 16, 1908.

The statue was dedicated on June 26, 1908. The dedication ceremony began with a prayer given by Edward Everett Hale, followed by speeches given by Mayor James Logan and Massachusetts Governor Curtis Guild Jr., and an oration by Associate Justice of the U.S. Supreme Court William Henry Moody. The ceremony concluded with the playing of "America".

== Design ==
The monument consists of a bronze statue of Hoar atop a granite pedestal. Hoar is sitting in a chair, with an overcoat hanging over the left arm of the chair. In his other hand, Hoar is holding a manuscript. Several bronze tablets with inscriptions are affixed to the pedestal. The inscriptions read as follows:

GEORGE FRISBIE HOAR
BORN IN CONCORD AUGUST 29 1826
DIED IN WORCESTER SEPTEMBER 30 1904
LAWYER SCHOLAR ORATOR STATESMAN
CITIZEN OF WORCESTER
FOR MORE THAN HALF A CENTURY
MEMBER OF MASSACHUSETTS HOUSE OF
REPRESENTATIVES 1852
MEMBER OF MASSACHUSETTS SENATE 1857
CITY SOLICITOR OF WORCESTER 1860
MEMBER OF THE UNITED STATES HOUSE OF
REPRESENTATIVES 1869–1877
SENATOR OF THE UNITED STATES 1877–1904

— WEST SIDE

PURITAN AND PATRIOT BY INHERITANCE
UNSULLIED IN CHARACTER
LOVER OF LIBERTY
CHAMPION OF THE OPPRESSED
HIS LIFE EMBODIED THE TRADITIONS OF
MASSACHUSETTS
AND OF THE FOUNDERS OF THE REPUBLIC
HIS HIGH IDEALS ZEAL FOR LEARNING AND
CONSTRUCTIVE STATESMANSHIP
MADE IMPERISHABLE CONTRIBUTIONS
TO A GREAT PERIOD OF AMERICAN HISTORY
THIS STATUE IS RAISED
BY GIFTS FROM THIRTY THOUSAND OF HIS
TOWNSFOLK
THAT THE PEOPLE FOR ALL TIME MAY BE
INSPIRED BY THE MEMORY
OF HIS PERSONAL VIRTUE AND PUBLIC SERVICE

— NORTH SIDE

"I BELIEVE IN GOD, THE LIVING GOD, IN THE AMERICAN PEOPLE, A FREE AND BRAVE PEOPLE, WHO DO NOT BOW THE NECK OR BEND THE KNEE TO ANY OTHER, AND WHO DESIRE NO OTHER TO BOW THE NECK OR BEND THE KNEE TO THEM.
"I BELIEVE THAT LIBERTY, GOOD GOVERNMENT, FREE INSTITUTIONS, CANNOT BE GIVEN BY ANY ONE PEOPLE TO ANY OTHER, BUT MUST BE WROUGHT OUT FOR EACH BY ITSELF, SLOWLY, PAINFULLY, IN THE PROCESS OF YEARS OR CENTURIES, AS THE OAK ADDS RING TO RING. I BELIEVE THAT, WHATEVER CLOUDS MAY DARKEN THE HORIZON, THE WORLD IS GROWING BETTER, THAT TODAY IS BETTER THAN YESTERDAY, AND TOMORROW WILL BE BETTER THAN TODAY."

— SOUTH SIDE

== See also ==
- 1908 in art
- Public sculptures by Daniel Chester French

== Bibliography ==
- "HOAR, George Frisbie". Historian of the United States House of Representatives. Archived from the original on November 25, 2020.
- Holzer, Harold (2019). Monument Man: The Life and Art of Daniel Chester French. Chronicle Books. ISBN 978-1-61689-829-8 – via Google Books.
- Nutt, Charles (1919). History of Worcester and Its People. Vol. III. Lewis Historical Publishing Company – via Google Books.
- Dedication of the Statue of the Hon. George Frisbie Hoar, Worcester, June Twenty-Sixth, 1908. Trustees of the George F. Hoar Memorial Fund. Belisle Printing & Publishing Company. 1908 – via Google Books.
- Tulloch, Donald (1914). Worcester, City of Prosperity: Sixteenth Annual Convention National Metal Trades Association. the Bancroft, Worcester, Massachusetts, April 20-22, 1914. Commonwealth Press – via Google Books.
