= Senator Knowlton =

Senator Knowlton may refer to:

- Hosea M. Knowlton (1847–1902), Massachusetts State Senate
- John S.C. Knowlton (1798–1871), Massachusetts State Senate
