= Joseph C. Casdin =

American politician

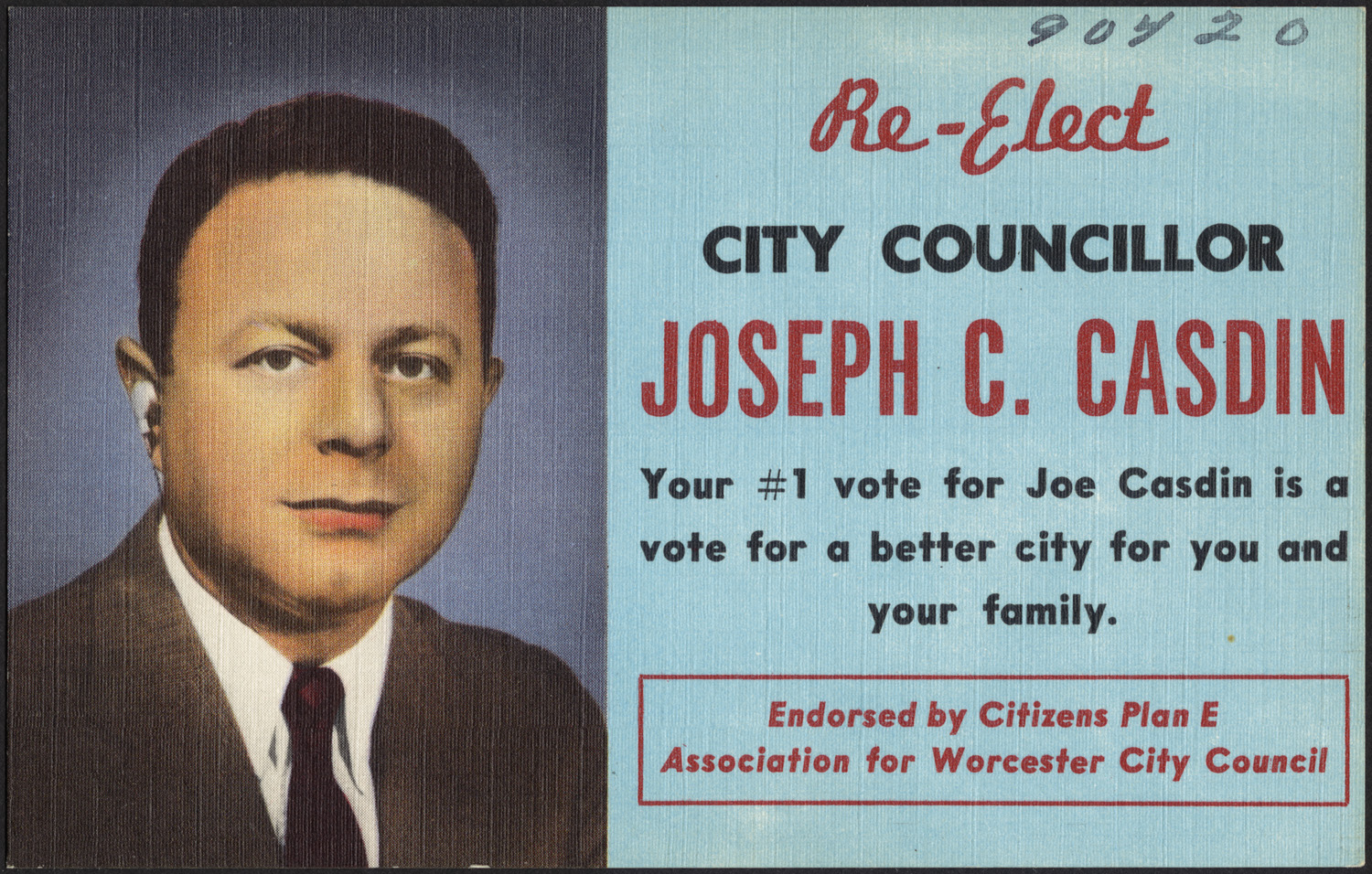
- Casdin, running for re-election as a Worcester city councilor.

54th Mayor of Worcester, Massachusetts
- In office 1967–1968
- Preceded by: George A. Wells
- Succeeded by: John M. Shea

51st Mayor of Worcester, Massachusetts
- In office September 1, 1962 – April 30, 1963
- Preceded by: John M. Shea
- Succeeded by: Paul V. Mullaney

48th Mayor of Worcester, Massachusetts
- In office 1959–1959
- Preceded by: James D. O'Brien
- Succeeded by: James D. O'Brien

Member of the City Council of Worcester, Massachusetts
- In office 1956–1982

Personal details
- Born: March 8, 1914 Worcester, Massachusetts
- Died: March 17, 2007 (aged 93) Worcester, Massachusetts
- Resting place: B'Nai Brith Cemetery Worcester.
- Party: Democratic

Joseph C. Casdin (March 8, 1914 – March 17, 2007) was a three-term mayor of Worcester, Massachusetts, and the city's first Jewish mayor.

== Early life ==
Casdin was born in Worcester to Simon and Ida (Ostroff) Cohen.

== Business career ==
Casdin owned and operated the Jobbers Outlet, a clothing store founded by his father.

== Public service ==
=== Worcester city council ===
Casdin was a member of the Worcester city council for thirteen terms, from 1956 to 1982.

=== Mayor of Worcester, Massachusetts ===
In accordance with the Worcester's weak mayor, Massachusetts Plan E city charter, the mayor was not popularly elected, but selected by the city council from among its members. Casdin served first in 1959, then from September 1, 1962, to April 30, 1963, and again in 1967 to 1968.

=== Campaign for United States House of Representatives ===
In 1968 Casdin ran for the fourth congressional district seat in the United States House of Representatives. Casdin lost the Democratic primary against Harold Donohue.

== Family life ==
Casdin married Miriam (Whitman) Casdin of Worcester, they had three children, two daughters and a son.

== Death and burial ==
Casdin died at the Jewish Healthcare Center in Worcester on March 17, 2007. Casdin was buried in the B'nai B'rith Cemetery in Worcester.
