= Henry Marsh =

Henry Marsh may refer to:

- Henry Marsh (naval officer) (died 1772), English naval officer
- Sir Henry Marsh, 1st Baronet (1790–1860), Irish surgeon
- Henry Marsh (runner) (born 1954), American Olympic steeplechase runner
- Henry Marsh (bishop) (1898–1995), Anglican bishop in Canada
- Henry Marsh (musician) (born 1948), British pop musician
- Henry Marsh (neurosurgeon) (born 1950), British neurosurgeon
- Henry Marsh (rugby union) (1850–1939), England rugby union international
- Henry Alan Marsh (1901–1950), British rotary aircraft test pilot and manager of Cierva Autogiro Company
- Henry A. Marsh (politician, born 1836) (1836–1914), American banker and mayor of Worcester, Massachusetts
- Henry G. Marsh (1921–2011), mayor of Saginaw, Michigan
- Henry L. Marsh (1933–2025), American politician and civil rights lawyer
- Henry W. Marsh (1860–1943), American insurance executive and co-founder of Marsh McLennan
- Henry A. Marsh (politician, born 1943), American businessman, athlete, politician, and educator
