= South High Community School =

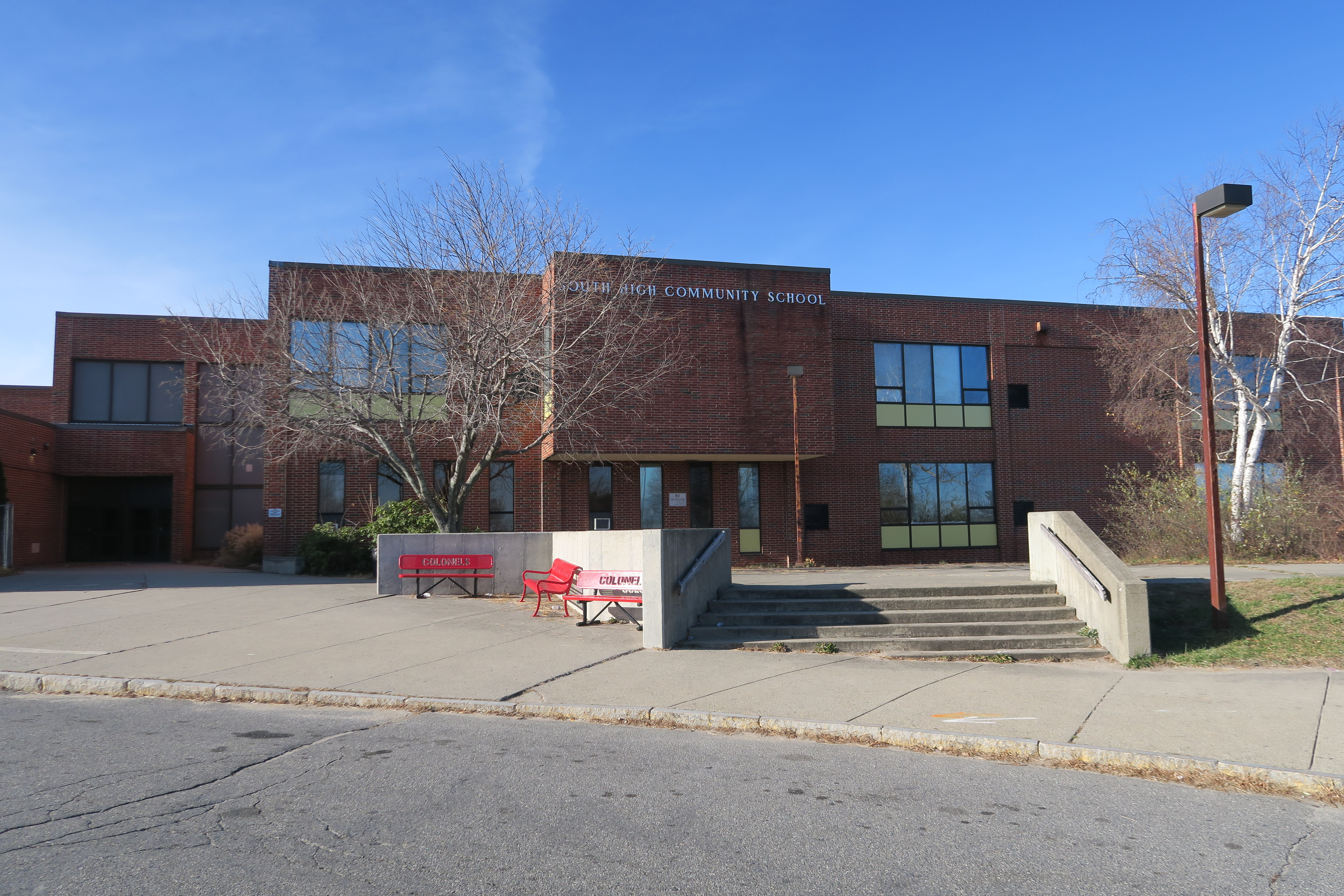

Location
- 170 Apricot St; Worcester, Massachusetts 01603; United States; 42.2444°N 71.8640°W

Information
- School type: Public; Open enrollment
- Established: 1901 14 Richards Street 1978 170 Apricot Street
- School district: Worcester Public Schools
- NCES District ID: 2513230
- Superintendent: Rachel H. Monárrez
- Principal: Jeff Creamer
- Staff: 128
- Grades: 9–12
- Enrollment: 1,666 (2022-23)
- Student to teacher ratio: 13.8 to 1 (2021)
- Colors: Red, black, and white
- Athletics conference: Central Massachusetts Athletic Conference
- Website: www.worcesterschools.org/o/shcs

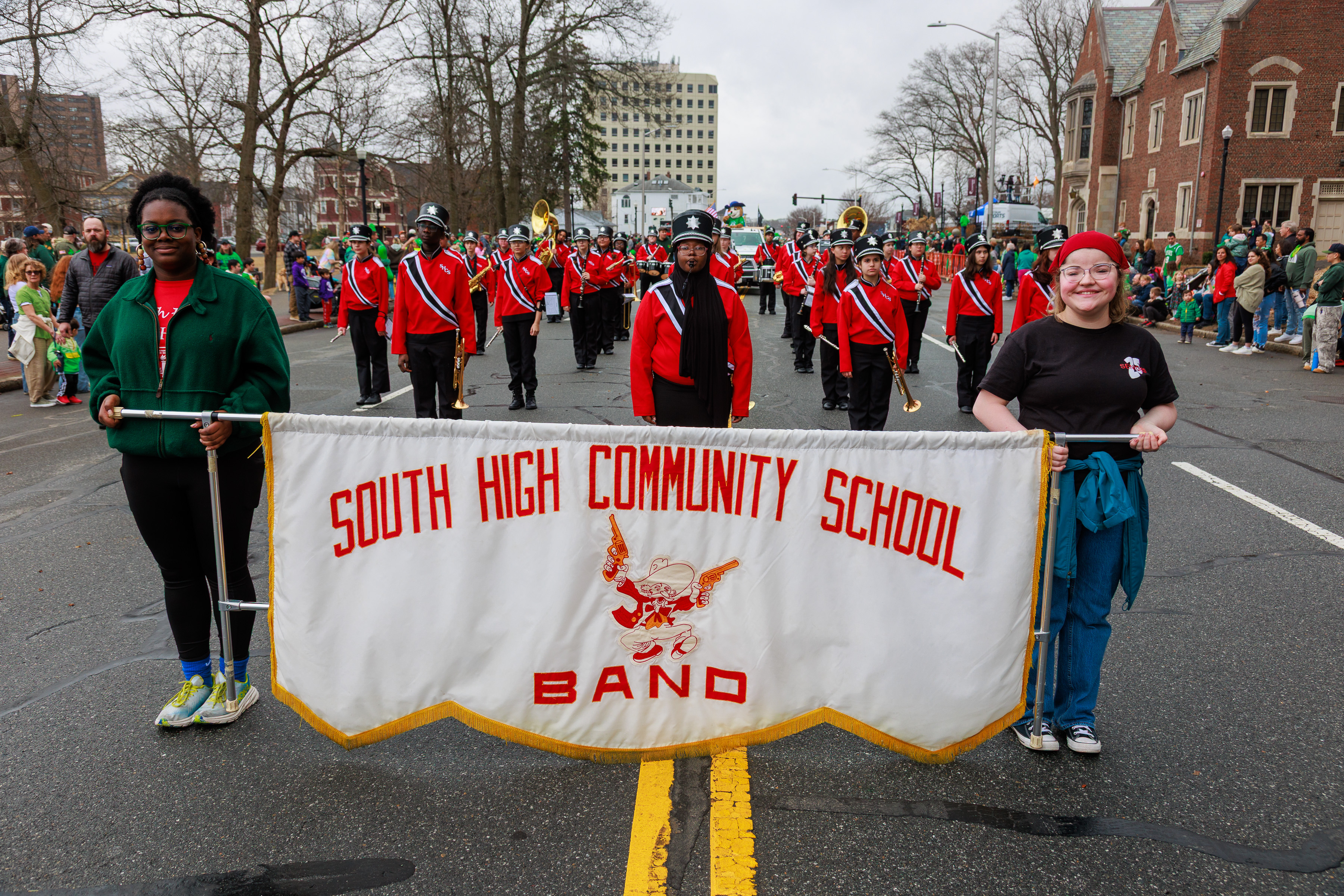
SHCS marching band at the 2025 St. Patrick's Day Parade in Worcester

South High Community School (SHCS) is a high school located in Worcester, Massachusetts, United States.

== Demographics ==
According to the Massachusetts Department of Education, the demographic profile of South High was as follows in the 2022-23 school year:

- Male - 53.4%
- Female - 46.6%
- Hispanic - 45.4%
- White - 23.3%
- African American - 17.1%
- Asian - 10.1%
- Multiracial, non-Hispanic - 3.9%
- Native American - 0.1%

== Notable alumni ==
- Cedric Ball (1986–87) - NBA basketball player with the Los Angeles Clippers
- Harvey Ball - artist known for designing the smiley face
- Robert Benchley - humorist known for writing for The New Yorker and writing and starring in the Academy Award-winning short film How to Sleep
- Robert H. Goddard (1904) - engineer, professor, physicist, inventor; credited with creating and building the world's first liquid-fueled rocket
- Arthur Kennedy - Tony (1949) and Golden Globe (1955) winning actor with five Oscar nominations
- David LeBoeuf (2008) - state representative (D-Worcester), 2019–present
- Joyner Lucas - two-time Grammy-nominated rapper
- Paul V. Mullaney (1938) - Mayor of Worcester (1963–65) and Marine Corps veteran of World War II and the Korean War
- Aaron Nkrumah (2019) – college basketball player
