= Senator Stoddard =

Senator Stoddard may refer to:

- Ebenezer Stoddard (1785–1847), Connecticut State Senate
- Elijah B. Stoddard (1827–1903), Massachusetts State Senate
