= Peleg Emory Aldrich =

Teacher, lawyer, politician, and jurist in Massachusetts

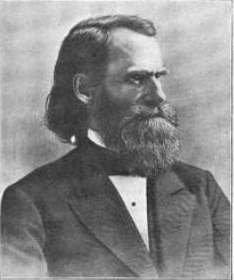

Associate Justice of the Massachusetts Superior Court
- In office 1873 – March 14, 1895
- Appointed by: William B. Washburn

Member of the Massachusetts House of Representatives
- In office 1866–1867

12th Mayor of Worcester, Massachusetts
- In office 1862 – January 3, 1863
- Preceded by: Isaac Davis
- Succeeded by: Daniel Waldo Lincoln

District Attorney for the Middle District of Massachusetts
- In office 1857–1865
- Preceded by: Elijah B. Stoddard
- Succeeded by: Hartley Williams
- In office 1853–1855
- Preceded by: Benjamin F. Newton
- Succeeded by: John H. Matthews

Personal details
- Born: July 24, 1813 New Salem, Massachusetts
- Died: March 14, 1895 (aged 71) Worcester, Massachusetts
- Party: Whig, Republican
- Education: Harvard Law School, L.L.B. 1844
- Occupation: Attorney

Peleg Emory Aldrich (July 24, 1813 – March 14, 1895) was a teacher, lawyer, politician and jurist who served as the twelfth mayor of Worcester, Massachusetts, and as an Associate Justice of the Massachusetts Superior Court.

== Early life ==
Aldrich was born on July 24, 1813, in New Salem, Massachusetts.

== Family life ==
Aldrich married Sarah Woods, of Barre, Massachusetts, in 1850. They had five children, three daughters and two sons.

== Early education and career ==
For his early education, Aldrich attended the public schools of New Salem, Massachusetts. At the age of sixteen, Aldrich entered the academy in Shelburne Falls, Massachusetts. After he left the academy, Aldrich went into teaching, first in Ashfield, Massachusetts, later, in 1837, in Tappahannock, Virginia. Aldrich studied law while he was teaching. In 1842 Aldrich entered Harvard Law School, graduating with the L.L.B. degree in 1844. Soon after he graduated from Harvard Law School, Aldrich returned to teaching in Virginia.

== Early legal career ==
Aldrich was admitted to the Virginia Bar in 1845, but he did not practice law there. Aldrich returned to Massachusetts and began working for the firm of Ashman, Chapman & Norton in Springfield, Massachusetts. Aldrich was admitted to the Massachusetts Bar at Hampden County in the spring of 1846. In December 1846, Aldrich moved to Barre, Massachusetts, where he opened a law office. Aldrich would stay in Barre for seven years.

=== Barre Patriot ===
For three of the years he was in Barre, Aldrich edited the Barre Patriot, which was a pro-Whig party newspaper.

=== District Attorney ===
In 1854 Governor Clifford appointed Aldrich as District Attorney for the Middle District, Aldrich moved to Worcester after he was appointed District Attorney. Aldrich served as the District Attorney until 1865. He served from 1853 to 1855 and again from 1857 to 1865.

== Political career ==
Aldrich was a member of the Whig Party until that party dissolved, at which point he joined the newly formed Republican Party.

=== Massachusetts Constitutional Convention of 1853 ===
Aldrich was a member of the Massachusetts Constitutional Convention of 1853.

=== Mayor of Worcester ===
Aldrich served as the mayor of Worcester, Massachusetts, in 1862. It was as the mayor of Worcester that Aldrich was present at the battle of Antietam because he had gone to the front to visit soldiers from the city. In 1865 he was elected a member of the American Antiquarian Society, which is located in Worcester.

=== Massachusetts House of Representatives ===
Aldrich served in the Massachusetts House of Representatives from 1866 to 1867.

== Later legal career ==
In January 1865, Aldrich formed a law firm, Bacon & Aldrich, in partnership with Peter C. Bacon. Aldrich stayed in this partnership until he was elevated to the bench in 1873.

== Judicial career ==
In 1873 Governor Washburn appointed Aldrich as an Associate Justice of the Massachusetts Superior Court. Aldrich remained on the court until his death on March 14, 1895.

== Notes ==
Political offices
Preceded by Isaac Davis	12th Mayor of Worcester, Massachusetts; January 6, 1862-January 3, 1863	Succeeded by D. Waldo Lincoln
