= Daniel Waldo (disambiguation) =

Daniel Waldo (1762–1864), veteran of the American Revolutionary War, later missionary and U.S. House clergy.

Daniel Waldo may also refer to:

- Daniel Waldo (Massachusetts politician), delegate to the Hartford Convention
- Daniel Waldo (Oregon pioneer) (1800–1880), pioneer in Oregon, United States
- Daniel Waldo Lincoln (1813–1880), American politician
