= 2nd Massachusetts Heavy Artillery Regiment =

2nd Massachusetts Heavy Artillery Regiment, U.S. Volunteers
- Massachusetts flag
- Active: 1863–1865
- Country: United States of America
- Allegiance: Union
- Branch: Artillery
- Type: Regiment
- Engagements: Rainbow Bluff expedition, Fort Branch, 1864. Southwest Creek/Battle of Wyse Fork, 1865.

Commanders
- Notable commanders: Colonel Jones Frankle; Brevet Brigadier General Augustus B. R. Sprague (February 1, 1864-September 20, 1865) (detachment)

The 2nd Massachusetts Volunteer Heavy Artillery Regiment was a regimental unit that fought in the American Civil War from 1863 to 1865. Initially formed 28 July 1863 in Readville, Massachusetts with Company A, it was supported with 11 other companies ending with Company M on 24 December 1863 (Company J did not exist).

The 2nd served in the states of Virginia and North Carolina during operations in Plymouth, North Carolina, Kinston, and Virginia.

== 2nd Massachusetts Heavy Artillery – Chronology ==
Source: Civil War Archive

=== Companies Established & Organized ===
- Jul 28, 1863 – Company A organized at Readville, MA.
- Jul 29, 1863 – Company B organized.
- Aug 4, 1863 – Company C organized.
- Aug 22, 1863 – Company D organized.
- Sep 5, 1863 – Companies A–D leave Massachusetts for New Berne, NC.
- Oct 5, 1863 – Company E organized.
- Oct 8, 1863 – Company F organized.
- Nov 7, 1863 – Companies E and F leave Massachusetts for New Berne, NC.
- Dec 7, 1863 – Companies G and H organized.
- Dec 11, 1863 – Company I organized.
- Dec 22, 1863 – Companies K and L organized.
- Dec 24, 1863 – Company M organized.
- Jan 8, 1864 – Companies K, L, and M leave Massachusetts for Fortress Monroe, VA.

=== Company Stationing & Service ===
- Company A – Fort Macon, NC (to Jul 1864) → New Berne (to Dec 1864) → Plymouth (to Mar 1865).
- Company B – Newport Barracks (to Dec 1864) → New Berne (to Mar 1865).
- Company C – Morehead City (to Jul 1864) → New Berne (to Mar 1865).
- Company D – Fort Macon (to Jul 1864) → New Berne (to Nov 1864) → Plymouth (to Mar 1865).
- Company E – Fort Totten (to Jul 1864) → New Berne (to Nov 1864) → Plymouth (to Mar 1865).
- Company F – Fort Totten (to Apr 1864) → Fort Levinson (to Jul 1864) → New Berne (to Mar 1865).
- Company G – Plymouth (to Apr 1864, captured at Siege of Plymouth, Apr 17–20, 1864) → reorganized at New Berne (to Apr 1865) → Fort Macon (to Jun 1865).
- Company H – Plymouth (to Apr 1864, captured at Siege of Plymouth) → re-formed at New Berne (to Nov 1864) → Plymouth (to Mar 1865).
- Company I – Norfolk & Portsmouth, VA (to Jul 1864) → New Berne, NC (to Mar 1865).
- Companies K & L – Norfolk & Portsmouth, VA, and other points in Virginia (to Apr 1865) → New Berne, NC (to Jun 1865).
- Company M – Norfolk & Portsmouth, VA (to May 1864) → New Berne, NC (to Mar 1865).

=== Campaigns & Battles ===
- Feb 13–15, 1865 – Expedition to Columbia, NC (Companies A, D, E, H).
- Mar 3–14, 1865 – Expedition to Kinston, NC.
- Mar 7, 1865 – Battle of Southwest Creek.
- Mar 8–10, 1865 – Battle of Wise’s Forks.
- Mar 14, 1865 – Occupation of Kinston.
- Mar–Jun 1865 – Provost duty at Kinston.

=== Final Service ===
- Jun 1865 – Regiment concentrated at New Berne → moved to Wilmington, Forts Fisher & Caswell, and Smithville, NC.
- Sep 2–16, 1865 – Regiment moved back to Boston.
- Sep 23, 1865 – Regiment mustered out.

=== Casualties ===
- Total lost: 382
- 15 enlisted men killed or mortally wounded
- 4 officers and 363 enlisted men died of disease
