= Paul V. Mullaney =

American politician and judge

Judge of the Dudley District Court
- In office 1978–1991
- Appointed by: Michael Dukakis

Mayor of Worcester
- In office January 1963 – January 1965
- Preceded by: Joseph C. Casdin
- Succeeded by: George A. Wells

Member of the Worcester City Council
- In office 1960–1967

Personal details
- Born: November 22, 1919 Main South, Worcester, Massachusetts, U.S.
- Died: November 1, 2017 (aged 97) Worcester, Massachusetts, U.S.
- Party: Democratic
- Children: 9
- Education: College of the Holy Cross (BA); Boston College (LLB)

Military service
- Branch/service: United States Marine Corps
- Years of service: 1942–1946; 1950–1952
- Rank: First Lieutenant
- Battles/wars: World War II; Korean War
- Awards: Bronze Star; Silver Star; Purple Heart (3)

Paul Vincent Mullaney (November 22, 1919 – November 1, 2017) was an American judge, lawyer and politician from Massachusetts.

== Early life and education ==
Born on November 22, 1919, Mullaney grew up in Main South, at the time a predominantly Irish-Catholic neighborhood in Worcester. He graduated from South High School in 1938. He then attended the College of the Holy Cross in Worcester, graduating in 1942. Between World War II and the Korean War, Mullaney earned a law degree from Boston College Law School in 1948.

== Military service ==
Upon graduation from Holy Cross, Mullaney enlisted in the United States Marine Corps with the 4th Marine Division as a sergeant. He ended the war as a commissioned first lieutenant, having served in Guam and Tinian. He returned to active duty in 1950, at the onset of the Korean War. He was first injured during the recapture of Seoul. He was injured a second time during the Chosin Reservoir campaign. On November 27, 1950, he was awarded his third Purple Heart for an injury at Chosin that would end his military career. He spent the better part of the following year recovering at Chelsea Naval Hospital. His military decorations included three Purple Hearts, Silver Star and Bronze Star.

== Professional career ==
After the war, Mullaney worked as an attorney at Ceaty, Ceaty, and McCarthy from 1952 to 1978. During that time, he was elected to the Worcester City Council from 1960-1967. He served as the Mayor of Worcester from 1963-1965. He mounted an unsuccessful campaign for the 3rd Congressional District of Massachusetts in 1974, losing in the Democratic primary to Joseph D. Early. In 1978, Mullaney was appointed a District Court Judge in Worcester County, where he served until his retirement in 1991.

== Personal life and death ==
Mullaney married his wife, Sarah McDermott, in 1952. They were married 62 years until her death in 2014. He had nine children. Mullaney was heavily involved in veteran activities within the city of Worcester. As Honorary Chairman, he was instrumental in completion of the Central Mass. Korean War Memorial in 2003, located in Worcester. In 2014, the city renamed city hall plaza "Paul Mullaney Plaza" in his honor. He was a longtime member of Blessed Sacrament Catholic Church, Worcester, MA. Mullaney died on November 1, 2017, at the age of 97.
