= Cedric Ball =

American basketball player

Personal information
- Born: April 16, 1968 (age 58) Worcester, Massachusetts, U.S.
- Listed height: 6 ft 8 in (2.03 m)
- Listed weight: 210 lb (95 kg)

Career information
- High school: South (Worcester, Massachusetts)
- College: Charlotte (1987–1990)
- NBA draft: 1990: undrafted
- Position: Small forward

Career history
- 1990–1991: Wichita Falls Texans
- 1990: Los Angeles Clippers
- 1996–1997: Quad City Thunder
- 1996–1997: Connecticut Pride
- Stats at NBA.com
- Stats at Basketball Reference

Cedric Glenn Ball (born April 16, 1968) is an American former professional basketball player born in Worcester, Massachusetts. He had a brief stint with the Los Angeles Clippers during the 1990–91 NBA season. Ball, a 6-foot-8-inch (2.03 m) and 210-pound (95 kg) small forward, attended South High Community School in Worcester and the University of North Carolina at Charlotte.

Ball also played professionally in Japan, France and Venezuela.

He now works as an associate in the Probation Department at the Western Worcester District Court in East Brookfield, Worcester County, Massachusetts. He is also studying to become a deacon at his Baptist church.
