= Henry Chapin =

American jurist and politician (1811–1878)

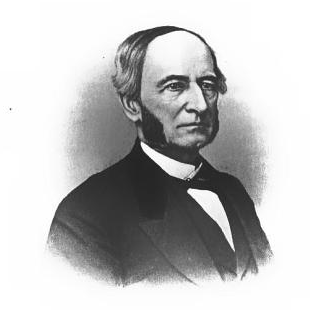
- Chapin in an 1899 publication

Acting Mayor of Worcester, Massachusetts
- In office December 19, 1870 – February 6, 1871
- Preceded by: James B. Blake
- Succeeded by: Edward Earle

2nd Mayor of Worcester, Massachusetts
- In office April 1. 1849 – April 7, 1851
- Preceded by: Levi Lincoln Jr.
- Succeeded by: Peter C. Bacon

Personal details
- Born: May 13, 1811
- Died: October 13, 1878 (aged 67)
- Party: Free Soil, Republican Party
- Education: Brown University
- Occupation: Attorney

Henry Chapin (May 13, 1811 – October 13, 1878) was a judge, a state legislator, and a three-term mayor of Worcester, Massachusetts.

== Early life and career ==
Chapin, a native of Upton, Massachusetts, graduated from Brown University in 1835. He served as an educator in Upton, studied law at Cambridge, and passed the Massachusetts Bar in 1838. He practiced law in Uxbridge from 1838 to 1846, and became an amateur local historian in that community.

== Later public service ==
Chapin represented the local district in the state legislature, served as the State's Commissioner of Insolvency, and on the State Board of Education.

In 1848, he was appointed chief Judge of the Worcester County Probate and Insolvency Court. Judge Chapin was later elected for three terms as Mayor of Worcester. In 1853, Mayor Chapin was nominated by the Republican Party for a Congressional seat, which he declined. A lifelong Unitarian, Chapin served in church leadership positions.

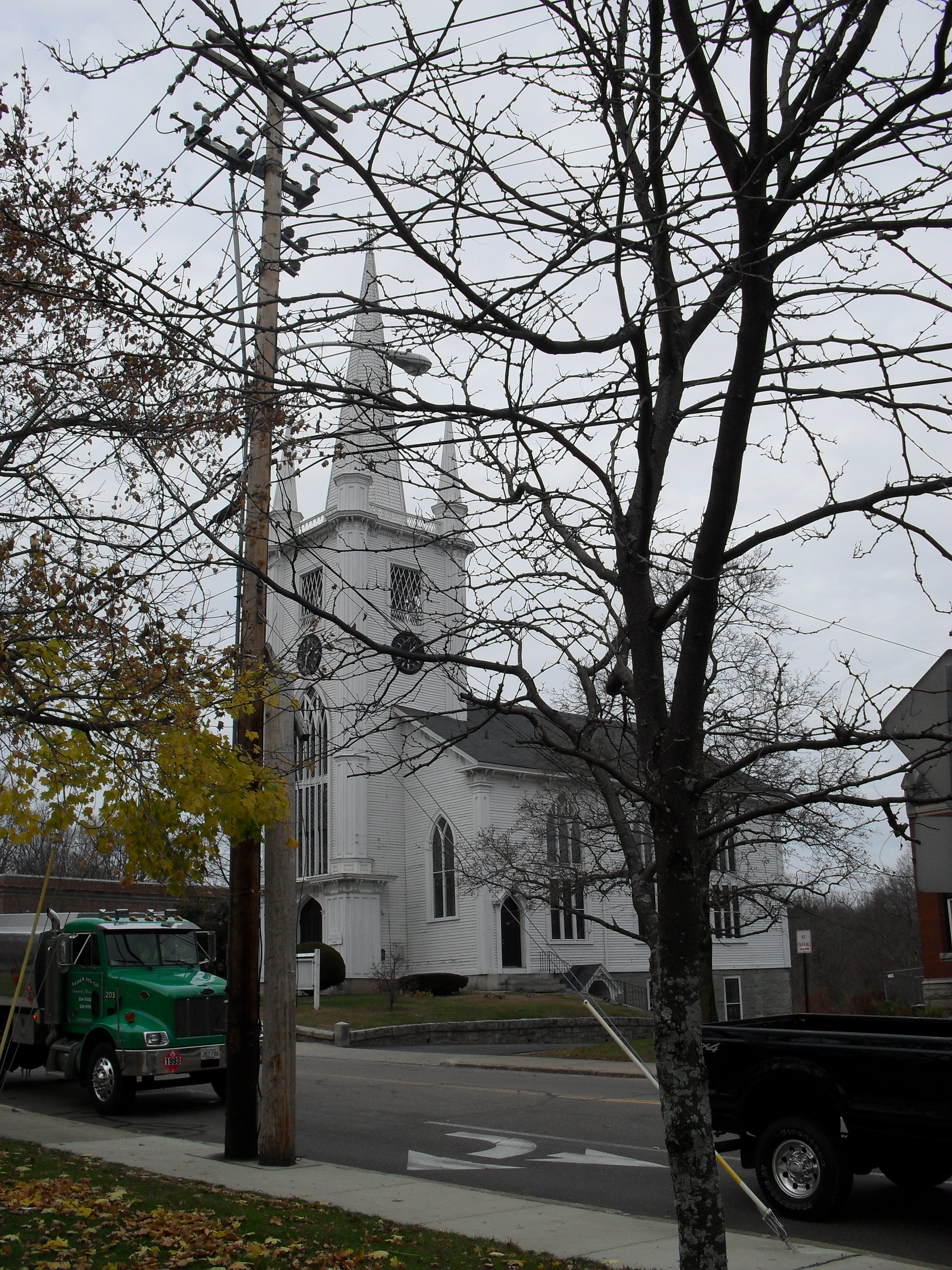
Unitarian Church at Uxbridge where Judge Henry Chapin delivered an address in 1864

Chapin was elected a member of the American Antiquarian Society in 1853.

== A historical address ==
In 1864, he delivered a later published historical address in Uxbridge, which records the story of America's first legal colonial woman voter. He is later simply known as "Judge Henry Chapin".

== Afterwards ==
Judge Chapin was asked to serve as Mayor of Worcester, one more time. On December 18, 1870, Chapin was appointed mayor, ad interim, by the city council, in joint convention, December 19, 1870, to fill the vacancy caused by the death of James B. Blake. Chapin served until Edward Earle was elected in a special election to serve out the remainder of Mayor Blake's term. In 1877 Chapin developed ill health; he died at age 67, in Worcester, on October 13, 1878.
