= Clark Jillson =

American politician (1825–1894)

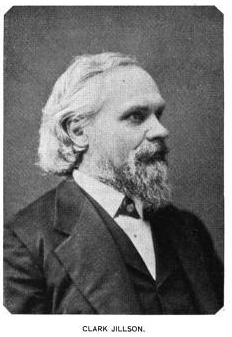

18th Mayor of Worcester, Massachusetts
- In office January 6, 1873 – January 5, 1874
- Preceded by: George F. Verry
- Succeeded by: Edward L. Davis

Personal details
- Born: April 11, 1825 Windham, Vermont
- Died: June 5, 1894 (aged 69) Worcester, Massachusetts
- Resting place: Rural Cemetery; Worcester, Massachusetts

Clark Jillson (April 11, 1825 – June 5, 1894) was an American politician who served as the 18th Mayor of Worcester, Massachusetts, from 1873 to 1874.

Clark Jillson was born in Windham, Vermont, on April 11, 1825. He was brought up on his father's farm in Vermont, also helping him in his blacksmith shop. He came to Worcester in 1845, taking a job with Howe & Goddard at seventy-five cents a day. Over the next eight years, he worked for various machinists across the city, including L. and A.G. Coes & Co. He also wrote for newspapers and magazines, and was elected president of the Young Men's Rhetorical Society in 1853.

In 1873, Jillson was elected Mayor of Worcester and served three terms. He was the first mayor to use the veto power, and his administration saw the first reduction of city debt in thirteen years.

Jillson was a founding member of the Sons and Daughters of Vermont, and served as president of Worcester Society of Antiquity.

Jillson died in Worcester on June 5, 1894, and was buried in Rural Cemetery.
