= Rufus B. Dodge Jr. =

American lawyer (1861–1935)

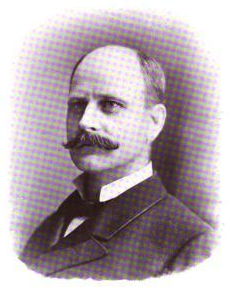

30th Mayor of Worcester, Massachusetts
- In office January 3, 1898 – February 25, 1901
- Preceded by: Augustus B. R. Sprague
- Succeeded by: Philip J. O'Connell

President of the Worcester, Massachusetts Board of Aldermen
- In office 1895–1895

Member of the Worcester, Massachusetts Board of Aldermen
- In office 1893–1895

Personal details
- Born: November 24, 1861 Clinton, Massachusetts, U.S.
- Died: December 13, 1935 (aged 74) Worcester, Massachusetts, U.S.
- Resting place: Hope Cemetery
- Spouse: Mary C. Perry
- Education: Boston University School of Law

Rufus B. Dodge Jr. (November 24, 1861 – December 13, 1935) was an American lawyer and politician who served as the mayor of Worcester, Massachusetts.

== Early life ==
Dodge was born in Charlton, Massachusetts, on November 24, 1861.

== Education ==
Dodge graduated cum laude from the Boston University School of Law in 1885.

== Public service ==
=== Clinton, Massachusetts School Committee ===
Dodge was elected to the Clinton, Massachusetts school committee when he was twenty years old.

=== Worcester, Massachusetts Board of Aldermen ===
Dodge served on the Worcester Board of Aldermen from 1893 to 1895, serving as the Board's President in 1895.

=== Mayor of Worcester, Massachusetts ===
In December 1897 Dodge was elected, as a Republican, the Mayor of Worcester, he served as Mayor from January 3, 1898 to February 25, 1901. Dodge's term was extended and he served until February 25, 1901 because there was a tie vote for Mayor in the election of December 1900.

== Personal life ==
Dodge married Mary C. Perry, a botanical collector.

Dodge died following an automobile accident at Park Avenue and Salisbury Street in Worcester on December 13, 1935. He was buried in Hope Cemetery.

== Notes ==
Political offices
Preceded by Augustus B. R. Sprague	30th Mayor of Worcester, Massachusetts; January 3, 1898–February 25, 1901	Succeeded by Philip J. O'Connell
