= Harvey Ball =

American commercial artist (1921–2001)

- Born: Harvey Ross Ball; July 10, 1921; Worcester, Massachusetts, U.S.
- Died: April 12, 2001 (aged 79); Worcester, Massachusetts, U.S.
- Education: Worcester South High School; Worcester Art Museum School
- Occupation: Commercial artist

Harvey Ross Ball (July 10, 1921 – April 12, 2001) was an American commercial artist. In 1963, he created a design for a pin back button, that played a pivotal role in the adoption of the modern day smiley face. Ball was approached by marketing director Joy Young of State Mutual Life Assurance Company in 1963, with the instructions to design "a little smile".

The State Mutual Life Assurance Company lapel pins later became a viral-success story, which had led to many calling Ball the creator of the Smiley face. He didn't trademark the design, and earned $45 for his efforts. Ball later founded the Harvey Ball World Smile Foundation in 1999, a non-profit charitable trust that supports children's causes.

Critics of Ball have suggested that his design was not revolutionary and he is not the creator. Billboard magazine, one of the biggest US publications at the time, ran numerous stories of the WMCA "Good Guys", who wore sweatshirts with a striking resemblance to Ball's work, albeit on different merchandise. Additionally, pins with happy catchphrases and graphical icons were extremely common in the US following World War II and the Great Depression, with some commentators suggesting lesser known designs likely pre-dated Ball's 1963 design.

== Early life and military career ==
Ball was born in Worcester, Massachusetts to Ernest G. Ball and Christine ("Kitty") Ross Ball, and had five siblings. Ball was a student at South High Community School and worked as an apprentice under a local sign painter. After high school and his apprenticeship, he studied fine arts at the Worcester Art Museum.

After his time at Worcester Art Museum School, Ball decided to go into the National Guard, where he served for 27 years. He was stationed in the Pacific and Asia during World War II. After his first military years with the National Guard, he served another 6 years in the Army Reserves and retired as a full colonel in 1979. A major accolade that he was granted after his service was the Bronze Star for his acts of heroism during the Battle of Okinawa. Ball was a decorated, respected veteran.

== Smiley design ==
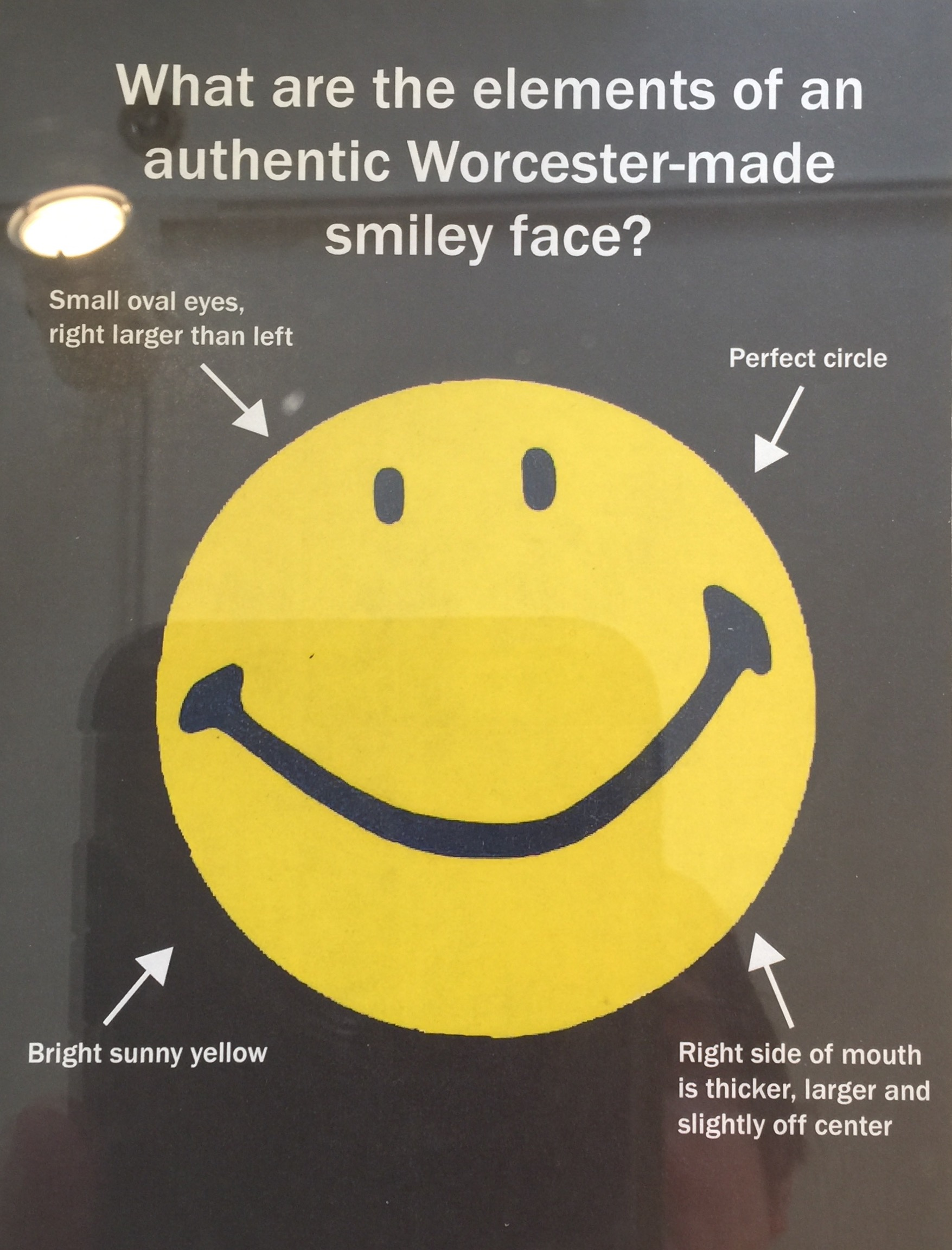
Harvey Ball's 1963 design

After World War II, Ball worked for a local advertising firm until he started his own business, Harvey Ball Advertising, in 1959. He designed the smiley in 1963. The State Mutual Life Assurance Company of Worcester, Massachusetts (now known as Hanover Insurance) had purchased Guarantee Mutual Company of Ohio. The merger resulted in low employee morale. In an attempt to solve this, Ball was employed in 1963 as a freelance artist, to come up with an image to increase morale. Ball started with a sunny-yellow circle containing a smile, however wasn't happy that it could be turned upside down to make a frown. By adding two eyes, he created a smiley face. The whole drawing took 10 minutes to complete, and earned him $45.

State Mutual had planned to hand out 100 button pins containing the design, however demand quickly soared. The aim was to get employees to smile while using the phone and doing other tasks. Research has since taken place confirming Ball's instincts. The buttons became popular, with orders being taken in lots of 10,000. More than 50 million smiley face buttons had been sold by 1971, and the smiley has been described as an international icon.

A Harvey Ball smiley face can be identified by three distinguishing features: narrow oval eyes (with the one on the right slightly larger than the one on the left), a bright sunny yellow color, and a mouth that is not a perfect arc, which has been claimed to be similar to a "Mona Lisa Mouth". The face has creases at the sides of the mouth, and the mouth is slightly off-center (with the right side a little higher than the left) and the right side of the mouth is slightly thicker than on the left.

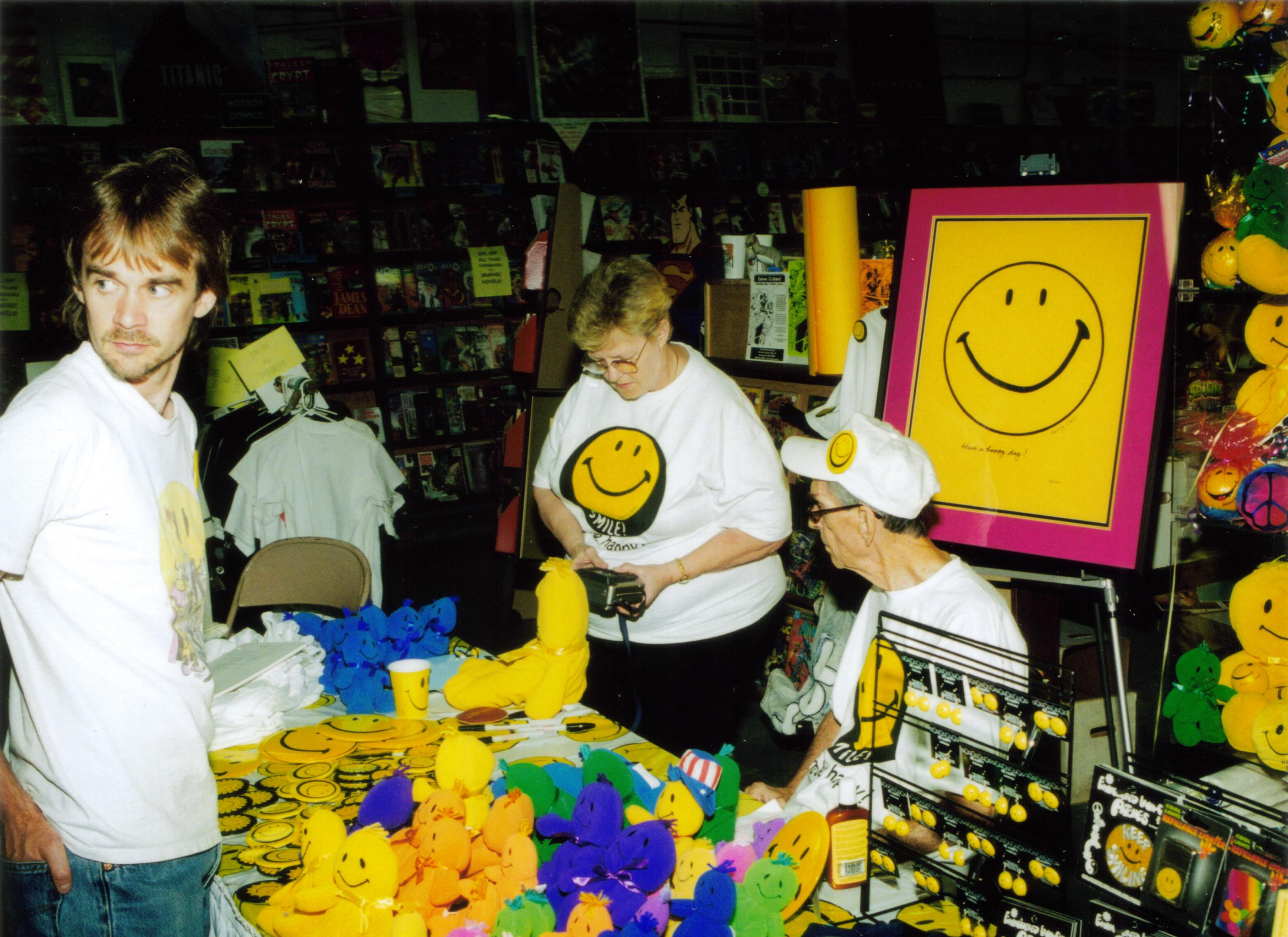
Ball (seated) at a public signing, 1998

The BBC broadcast a radio documentary on February 4, 2012, called Smiley's People that covered the story of the smiley. On July 18, 1998, around the 35th anniversary of the design's inception, Ball appeared at That's Entertainment to meet fans and sign smiley pins and art. At this appearance Ball was shown copies of the graphic novel Watchmen issue number 1, which featured a notorious image of a smiley face with a splatter of blood across it. Store Manager Ken Carson was quoted as saying Ball seemed amused to see it on the cover.

Ball founded the World Smile Foundation in 1999, a non-profit charitable trust that supports children's causes. The group licenses Smileys and organizes World Smile Day, which takes place on the first Friday of October each year and is a day dedicated to "good cheer and good works". The catchphrase for the day is: "Do an act of kindness – help one person smile."

In 1999, Ball sent Marilyn Manson an autographed smiley pin with the text "Lighten Up Marilyn" after the musician stormed off stage in Cedar Rapids, Iowa, after seeing a smiley sticker had been placed on his gear. Ball also gave Manson details about "World Smile Day" scheduled for October 1, saying, "I hope he doesn’t have any concerts booked on that date."

Following Ball's death, the American media lauded Ball as the creator of the smiley face, including Smithsonian. Many wrongly stated that his 1963 design was the first and therefore original. After those claims were made, some journalists pointed to the New York radio station WMCA which used a yellow and black design for its "Good Guys!" campaign in the early 1960s. The designs did appear on sweatshirts rather than buttons. By 1963, over 11,000 sweatshirts had been distributed the year which Ball created his design. They were featured in Billboard magazine, and numerous celebrities, including actress Patsy King and Mick Jagger, were photographed wearing them. Some commentators have questioned whether it is appropriate to credit a sole creator when similar designs existed in the same period.

Ball attempted to trademark the design in 1971, eight years after it was designed by contacting a patent attorney to begin the process. He was informed that the design by this stage was already in the public domain, and therefore he was unable to trademark his design. In an interview many years later Ball said, "it never bothered me. I figured if I make the world a little happier, OK, fine." Telegram & Gazette reported Charles Ball (his son) saying, "He was not a money-driven guy, he used to say, 'Hey, I can only eat one steak at a time, drive one car at a time.'" It was believed the public domain comment was due to designs appearing between 1963 and 1971, few considered that it could have been that similar designs were in the public domain pre-1963, but that could have been the case. The other potential trademark issue was Ball's design was part of a wider movement of smiley lapel pins, with designs from other US producers completely outselling Ball's design. One such example was Philadelphian brothers Bernard and Murray Spain designed and sold products with the phrase and logo in the early 1970s. They trademarked the combination and later changed the phrase to "Have a nice day", which has since become a common phrase in North America. During the 1970s, the Spain brothers apparently sold and distributed 5 million items of merchandise, containing their smiley face.

Ball also stated in numerous interviews that 50 million badges were distributed or sold (depending on the source) by 1971 which featured his design. Many publications used this as proof that he was the creator of the smiley, including The New York Times at the time of his death. However, the Spain brothers also made the same claim of 50 million items, and in more recent years this has been toned down to 5 million by the Spain brothers. To add further contradiction, Joy P. Young who worked on the design with Ball stated that by their official button was distributed to 100 employees only, and later a "trickle" of requests to her personally meant some buttons were sent out. When the requests began to flood in from 1969 onwards, the insurance company decided "to drastically curtail button distribution." She then followed up to say that in the years following the decision to cut distribution she began to see lots of smile buttons "that weren't ours."

== Death and legacy ==
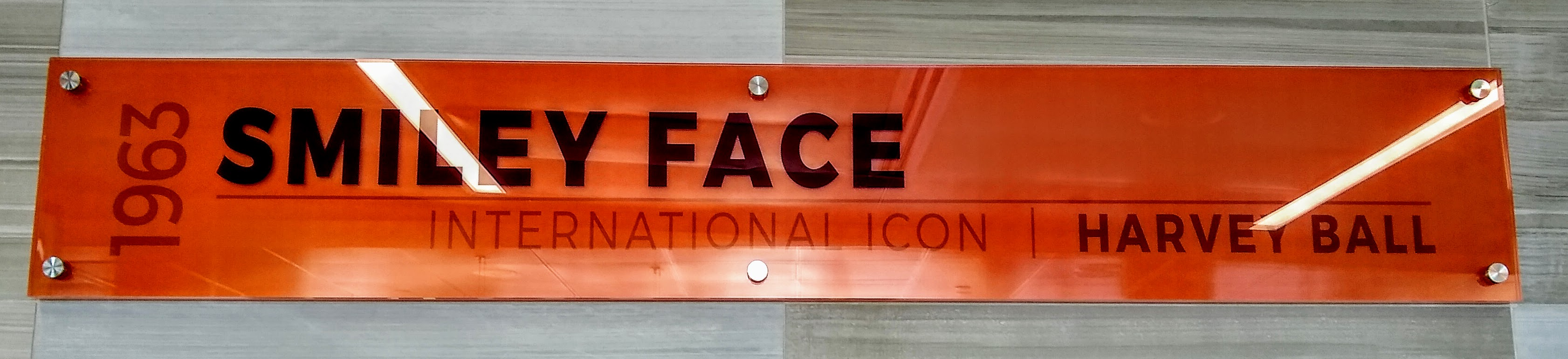
A plaque honoring Harvey Ball and his contribution to the Smiley Face at Boston's Logan International Airport

Ball died on April 12, 2001, as a result of liver failure following a short illness. He was 79. He left behind his wife of 54 years, Winifred Trudell, and four children.

The land that was owned by the Ball family, off Granite Street in Worcester, was purchased by the City of Worcester in June 2007, with help from Mass Audubon and a $500,000 grant from the state Executive Office of Environmental Affairs' Division of Conservation Services. This property links Mass Audubon's Broad Meadow Brook Sanctuary with the developing Blackstone River Bikeway. It is now known as the "Harvey Ball Conservation Area" and is home to the appropriately named "Smiley Face Trail".
