= George Merrill Wright =

American politician (1865–1926)

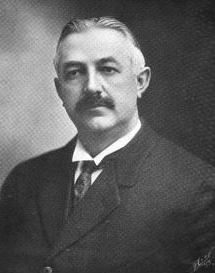

37th Mayor of Worcester, Massachusetts
- In office January 6, 1913 – January 1, 1917
- Preceded by: David F. O'Connell
- Succeeded by: Pehr G. Holmes

Member of the Worcester, Massachusetts Board of Aldermen

Member of the Worcester, Massachusetts Common Council

Personal details
- Born: April 12, 1865 Clinton, Massachusetts, U.S.
- Died: January 7, 1926 (aged 60) Worcester, Massachusetts, U.S.
- Resting place: Hope Cemetery
- Spouse: Minnie E. Searle
- Children: 3
- Occupation: Businessman; politician
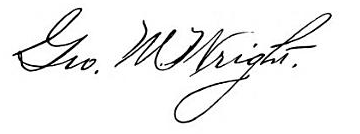
- Signature

George Merrill Wright (April 12, 1865 – January 7, 1926) was an American businessman and politician who served as the mayor of Worcester, Massachusetts from January 6, 1913 to January 1, 1917.

== Early life ==
Wright was born to George Fletcher and Harriet Elizabeth (Wright) Wright in Clinton, Massachusetts, on April 12, 1865. He married Minnie E. Searle, they had three children George Francis Wright, Ralph Wyman Wright and Florence Marian Wright.

== Business career ==
In 1883, Wright, along with his father George F. Wright and brother Herbert N. Wright, founded the Wright Wire Company in Palmer, Massachusetts. Wright secured a number of patents on making wire and weaving wire cloth. In 1890 he opened a wire factory in Worcester. In 1919 he sold his business to the Clinton Wire Company, which became the Clinton Wright Wire Company. Wright was also involved in the real estate business and in 1910 purchased a poultry and cattle farm in Charlton, Massachusetts.

== Public service ==
Wright elected to the Worcester Common Council in 1900 and 1901, and to the Worcester Board of Aldermen in 1902. He was the Mayor of Worcester from January 6, 1913. to January 1, 1917. During his tenure as mayor, the city constructed a new bridge over Lake Quinsigamond and North High School and enacted a pay as you go policy.

Wright was stricken with a cerebral hemorrhage on January 6, 1928, and died the following day at his son's home in Worcester. He was survived by his wife, two sons, and daughter. He was buried in Hope Cemetery.

== Notes ==
Political offices
Preceded by David F. O'Connell	37th Mayor of Worcester, Massachusetts; January 6, 1913–January 1, 1917	Succeeded by Pehr G. Holmes
