= Augustus B. R. Sprague =

Augustus Brown Reed Sprague
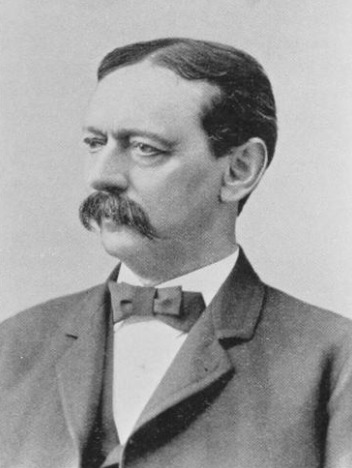

30th Mayor of Worcester, Massachusetts
- In office January 6, 1896 – January 3, 1898
- Preceded by: Henry A. Marsh
- Succeeded by: Rufus B. Dodge Jr.

17th sheriff of Worcester County, Massachusetts
- In office July 5, 1871 – January 1890
- Appointed by: William Claflin (appointed to fill vacancy)
- Preceded by: John S.C. Knowlton
- Succeeded by: Samuel D. Nye

Personal details
- Born: March 7, 1827 Ware, Massachusetts
- Died: March 17, 1910 (aged 83) Worcester, Massachusetts

Military service
- Allegiance: United States of America; Union
- Branch/service: Union Army
- Years of service: 1861–1865
- Rank: Colonel; Brevet Brigadier General
- Unit: 3rd Massachusetts Rifle Battalion; 15th Massachusetts Infantry Regiment; 25th Massachusetts Infantry Regiment
- Commands: 51st Massachusetts Infantry Regiment; 2nd Massachusetts Heavy Artillery Regiment
- Battles/wars: American Civil War; Battle of Roanoke Island; Battle of New Bern.

Augustus Brown Reed Sprague (March 7, 1827 – May 17, 1910) was an American businessman, politician, and military figure who served as the mayor of Worcester, Massachusetts, the sheriff of Worcester County, Massachusetts, and as a Union Army officer during the American Civil War.

== Civil War service ==
At the start of the American Civil War, Sprague enlisted in the Union Army on April 17, 1861, and Sprague was mustered into United States Service as a captain in the Third Massachusetts Rifles on April 19, 1861.

On September 9, 1861, when the 25th Regiment Massachusetts Volunteer Infantry was raised by the authority of the state of Massachusetts, Sprague was designated the unit's Lieutenant Colonel.

Sprague served with the 25th Massachusetts Infantry in Burnside's North Carolina Expedition. Sprague was cited for bravery at the Battles of Roanoke Island and New Bern.

Sprague served in North Carolina, Maryland, Pennsylvania and Virginia.

In November 1862 he became colonel of the 51st Massachusetts Infantry Regiment. The regiment served in the Carolinas under General John G. Foster. He was mustered out of service, with his regiment, in July 1863.

He was commissioned lieutenant colonel of the 2nd Massachusetts Heavy Artillery Regiment on February 1, 1864, and was mustered out in September 1865. Afterwards he was brevetted as a brigadier general for "gallant and meritorious services during the war".

In March 1868 he became a charter member of the Massachusetts Commandery of the Military Order of the Loyal Legion of the United States (MOLLUS), a military society for Union officers. He served as its first junior vice commander in 1868 and its commander in 1908. Sprague was assigned MOLLUS insignia number 683.

Sprague was also a member of the Grand Army of the Republic and served as commander of the Department of Massachusetts in 1868.

== Public service ==
Sprague served as collector of internal revenue for the 8th Massachusetts District from 1867 to 1872.

Sprague served as sheriff of Worcester County from July 5, 1871 to 1890 and was a member of the Worcester City Council.

On January 6, 1896 Sprague was sworn in as the Mayor of Worcester, Massachusetts. He served until January 3, 1898.

Professionally, he was president of Worcester Mechanics Savings Bank and was also president of the Worcester Electric Light Company.

== Family ==
Source - Genealogy in Part of the Sprague Families of America; Augustus B. R. Sprague; pg. 28-29.

General Sprague was born in Ware, Massachusetts, to Lee and Lucia (Snow) Sprague. Sprague was a descendant of William Sprague who settled in Charlestown and Hingham, Massachusetts, in the early 1600s. He was also descendant from Mayflower passengers Stephen Hopkins, John Alden and Priscilla Mullins.

In 1846 he married Elizabeth Janes with whom he had five children. Elizabeth died in 1889. In 1890 he married Mary Jennie Barbour with whom he had one child.

Augustus B. R. Sprague died at his home in Worcester, Massachusetts, on May 17, 1910.

== Notes ==
Political offices
Preceded by Henry A. Marsh	29th Mayor of Worcester, Massachusetts; January 6, 1896–January 3, 1898	Succeeded by Rufus B. Dodge Jr.
Preceded by John S.C. Knowlton	17th Sheriff of Worcester County, Massachusetts; July 5, 1871-January 1890	Succeeded by Samuel D. Nye
