= Jewish Healthcare Center (Worcester) =

American hospital and nursing home

Coordinates: 42.293°N 71.839°W

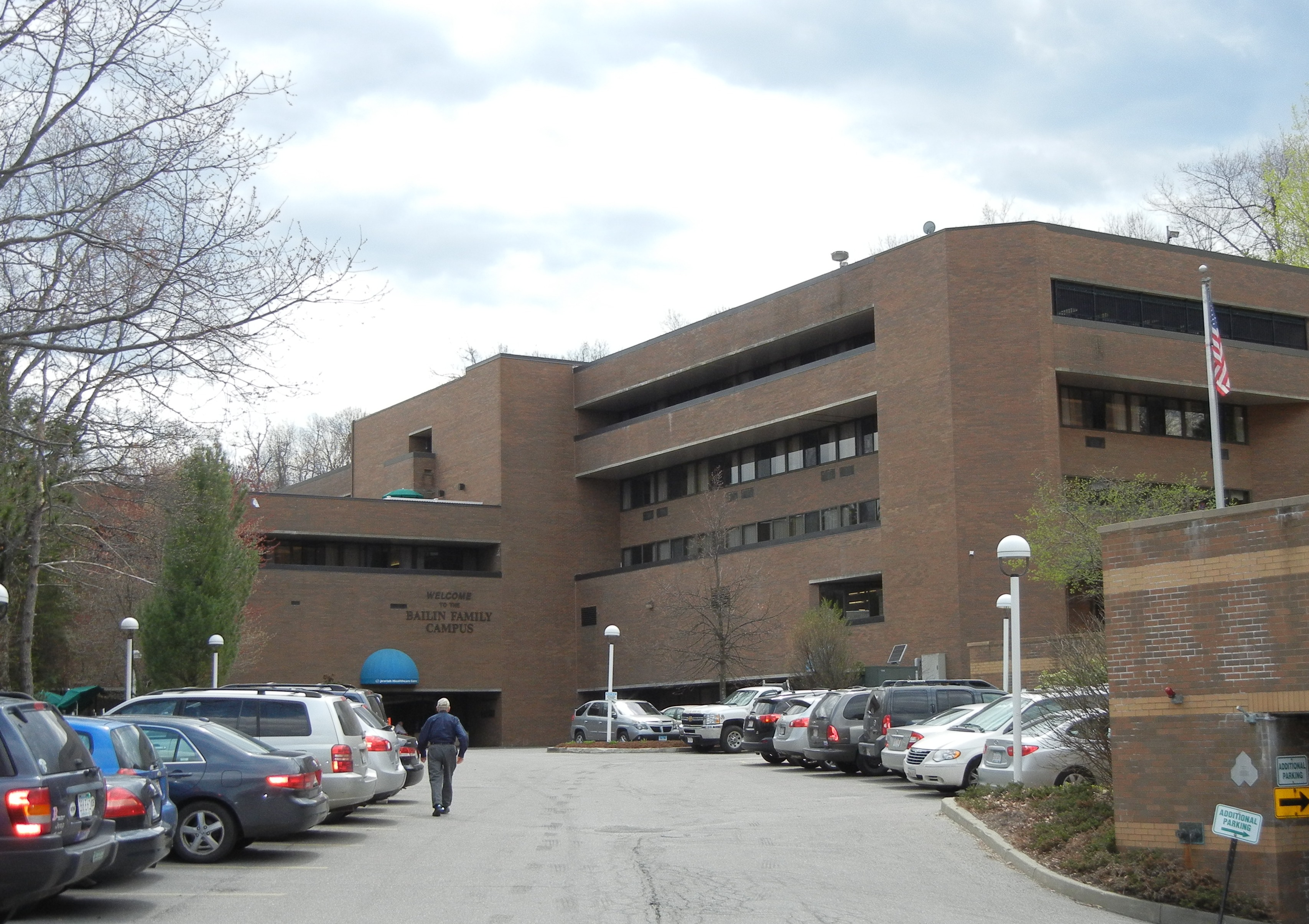
- The Jewish Healthcare Center in 2015

Geography
- Location: 629 Salisbury Street, Worcester, Massachusetts, United States

Organization
- Type: Specialist
- Religious affiliation: Judaism

Services
- Emergency department: No
- Speciality: Rehabilitation

History
- Former names: Jewish Home for Aged and Orphans
- Opened: 1914

Links
- Website: www.jhccenter.org
- Lists: Hospitals in Massachusetts

The Jewish Healthcare Center ("JHC"; also known as "The Jewish Home" or simply "The Home" among the Worcester Jewish community) is a nursing home and rehabilitation hospital at 629 Salisbury Street in Worcester, Massachusetts. The JHC services 2,500 clients per year, 70 percent of whom are not Jewish.

== History ==
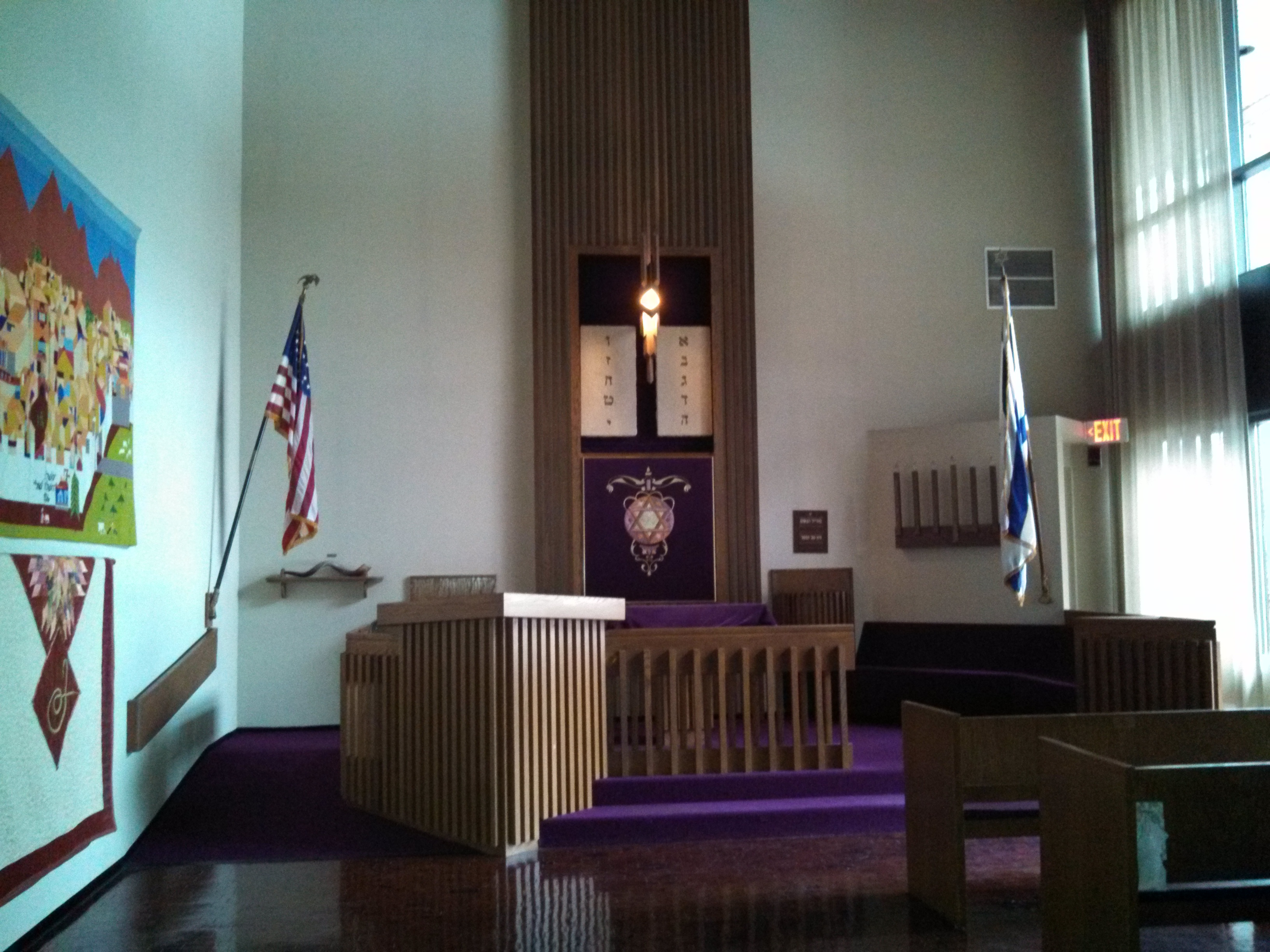
Jewish Healthcare Center Chapel

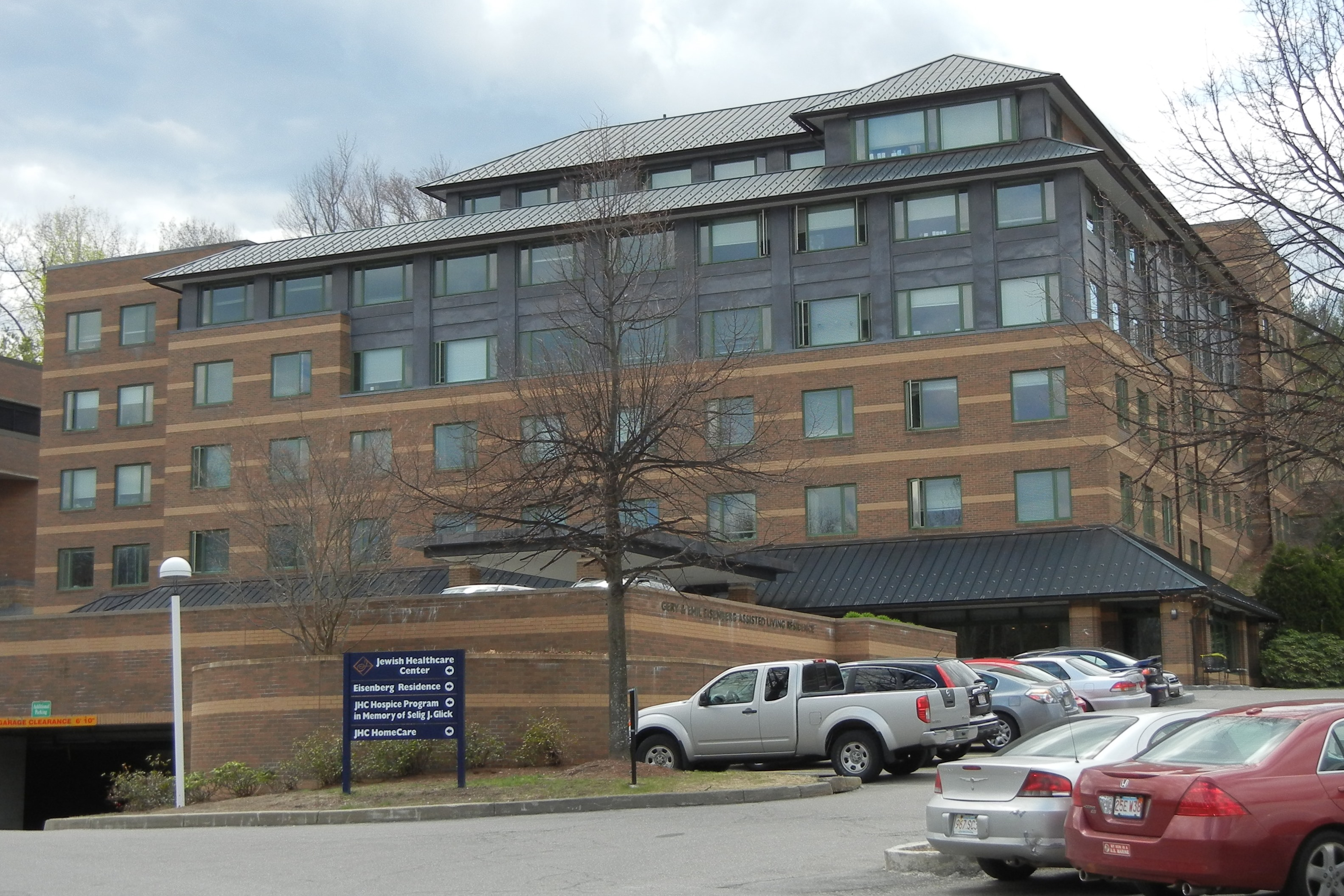
Eisenberg Assisted Living Residence

The Home was founded by Worcester's Jewish community leaders in 1914 as a home for Jewish orphans. In 1916, the community purchased a two-story home at 25 Coral Street and named it the "Jewish Home for Aged and Orphans."

Beginning August 11, 1930 Worcester United Jewish Charities president Archibald Hillman enlisted New York fundraiser George Greenspun to lead a 500-volunteer campaign to raise $125,000 from the Worcester community for a new facility. This campaign was unique in that for the first time, Worcester's non-Jewish residents were asked to contribute to a Jewish organization in the city. In 1932, the Home relocated to 1029 Pleasant Street where it was able to care for 14 children and 22 senior citizens following the successful building campaign. In the mid-1930s the Home turned its focus solely to the needs of the elderly and was renamed "The Jewish Home for Aged of Worcester County." The Home expanded by 34 beds in 1948 following a $250,000 campaign.

The current 141-bed facility at 629 Salisbury Street, an example of Brick Brutalist architecture, opened in February 1975 after another successful campaign raised $3.5 million. The Home's population remains largely Jewish as it is the only kosher nursing home in Worcester.

On May 3, 1998, ground was broken on land immediately adjacent to the Home on The Gery and Emil Eisenberg Assisted Living Residence, an 80-unit facility named for the parents of Denise Rich who donated $1 million.

In 2007, in recognition of a large donation from the Bailin Brothers Foundation, the campus at 629 Salisbury Street was named for the Bailin family.

On April 29, 2014, JHC launched the "Namaste Care" program, a new holistic approach to end-of-life care for dementia patients in which they experience massage, familiar foods and music (via iPods) and other comforts in a soundproof room.

== Notable residents ==
- Joseph C. Casdin, mayor of Worcester in 1959, 1962-1963 and 1967-1968
- Georgia Gibbs, singer. Born Frieda Lipschitz on August 17, 1919, was sent to the home with her three older siblings after her father died when she was 6 months old.
