= George W. Richardson (Massachusetts politician) =

American politician (1808–1886)

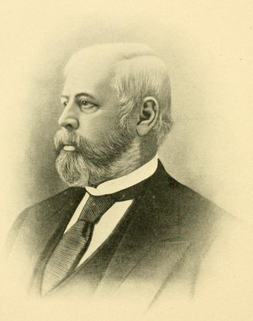

5th and 7th Mayor of Worcester, Massachusetts
- In office January 1, 1855 – January 7, 1856
- Preceded by: John S.C. Knowlton
- Succeeded by: Isaac Davis
- In office January 5, 1857 – January 4, 1858
- Preceded by: Isaac Davis
- Succeeded by: Isaac Davis

14th Sheriff of Worcester County, Massachusetts
- In office 1854–1856
- Preceded by: James Estabrook
- Succeeded by: John S.C. Knowlton

Personal details
- Born: George Washington Richardson; October 28, 1808 Boston, Massachusetts
- Died: June 1886 (aged 77) Saint John, New Brunswick
- Party: Know Nothing
- Spouse(s): Lucy Dana White, (m. 1836, d. 1875)
- Children: Clifford; Anna Maria (b. 1836)
- Education: Harvard College, 1829.
- Occupation: Lawyer

George Washington Richardson (October 28, 1808 – June 19, 1886) was an American politician who served as the Sheriff of Worcester County, Massachusetts, and twice as mayor of Worcester, Massachusetts.

== Biography ==
Richardson was born on October 28, 1808 in Boston, Massachusetts. He graduated from Harvard College in 1829 along with classmates that included William Henry Channing, James Freeman Clarke, Benjamin Robbins Curtis, George T. Davis, Oliver Wendell Holmes Sr., Isaac Edward Morse, Benjamin Peirce, Samuel Francis Smith, and Charles Storer Storrow. He was admitted to the Massachusetts Bar in 1835.

Richardson married Lucy Dana White, of Watertown, Massachusetts, on January 6, 1836. they had two children Clifford Richardson and Anna Maria Richardson.

Richardson served as the Sheriff of Worcester County, Massachusetts from 1854 to 1856. He served as the mayor of Worcester from January 1, 1855, to January 7, 1856, and from January 5, 1857, to January 4, 1858. Richardson was elected in 1854 as a member of the Know Nothing party, Richardson received a majority of 1,311 votes. In December 1856 Richardson was elected the seventh mayor of Worcester with a majority of 55 votes.

His wife Lucy died on July 20, 1875. Richardson himself died in Saint John, New Brunswick in June 1886. He is buried at the Worcester Rural Cemetery.

== Notes ==
Political offices
Preceded by John S.C. Knowlton	5th Mayor of Worcester, Massachusetts; January 1, 1855-January 7, 1856	Succeeded by Isaac Davis
Preceded by James Estabrook	14th Sheriff of Worcester County, Massachusetts; 1854–1856	Succeeded by John S.C. Knowlton
Preceded by Isaac Davis	7th Mayor of Worcester, Massachusetts; January 5, 1857-January 4, 1858	Succeeded by Isaac Davis
