= The Great State of Massachusetts =

The Great State of Massachusetts, words by George A. Wells, and music by J. Earl Bley, is a song that was designated the state glee club song of Massachusetts on November 24, 1997.

Wells, a politician from Worcester, Massachusetts, was a delegate to the 1960 Democratic National Convention, which nominated Massachusetts' John F. Kennedy as president. The convention band was unable to find a song that identified Kennedy with his home state and on his way home, Wells wrote The Great State of Massachusetts. J. Earl Bley, a musician friend of Wells, wrote the music. On November 24, 1997, The Great State of Massachusetts was designated the state glee club song of Massachusetts by the Massachusetts General Court.
