= George F. Verry =

American politician

George Franklin Verry
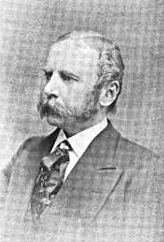

17th Mayor of Worcester, Massachusetts
- In office January 1, 1872 – January 6, 1873
- Preceded by: Edward Earle
- Succeeded by: Clark Jillson

Personal details
- Born: July 14, 1826 Mendon, Massachusetts, US
- Died: October 5, 1883 (aged 57) Worcester, Massachusetts, US
- Party: Democratic

George Franklin Verry (July 14, 1826 – October 5, 1883) was an American politician who served as the 17th Mayor of Worcester, Massachusetts, from 1872 to 1873.

George F. Verry was born on July 14, 1826, in Mendon, Massachusetts. In his childhood, Verry lived with his uncle, Samuel Verry, and his brother, Nathan T. Verry. He attended Phillips Academy in Andover, Massachusetts. When he was 23 years old, he began studying law in the office of Henry D. Stone and was admitted to the bar in 1851.

In 1872, Verry was elected Mayor of Worcester. He ran for re-election in 1873, but was defeated. He was a member of the State Senate in 1874 and 1875. In 1876, he was a delegate to the Democratic National Convention from Massachusetts.

Verry died on October 5, 1883, in Worcester.

== See also ==
- 1874 Massachusetts legislature
- 1875 Massachusetts legislature
