= Walter J. Cookson =

American politician (1876–1936)

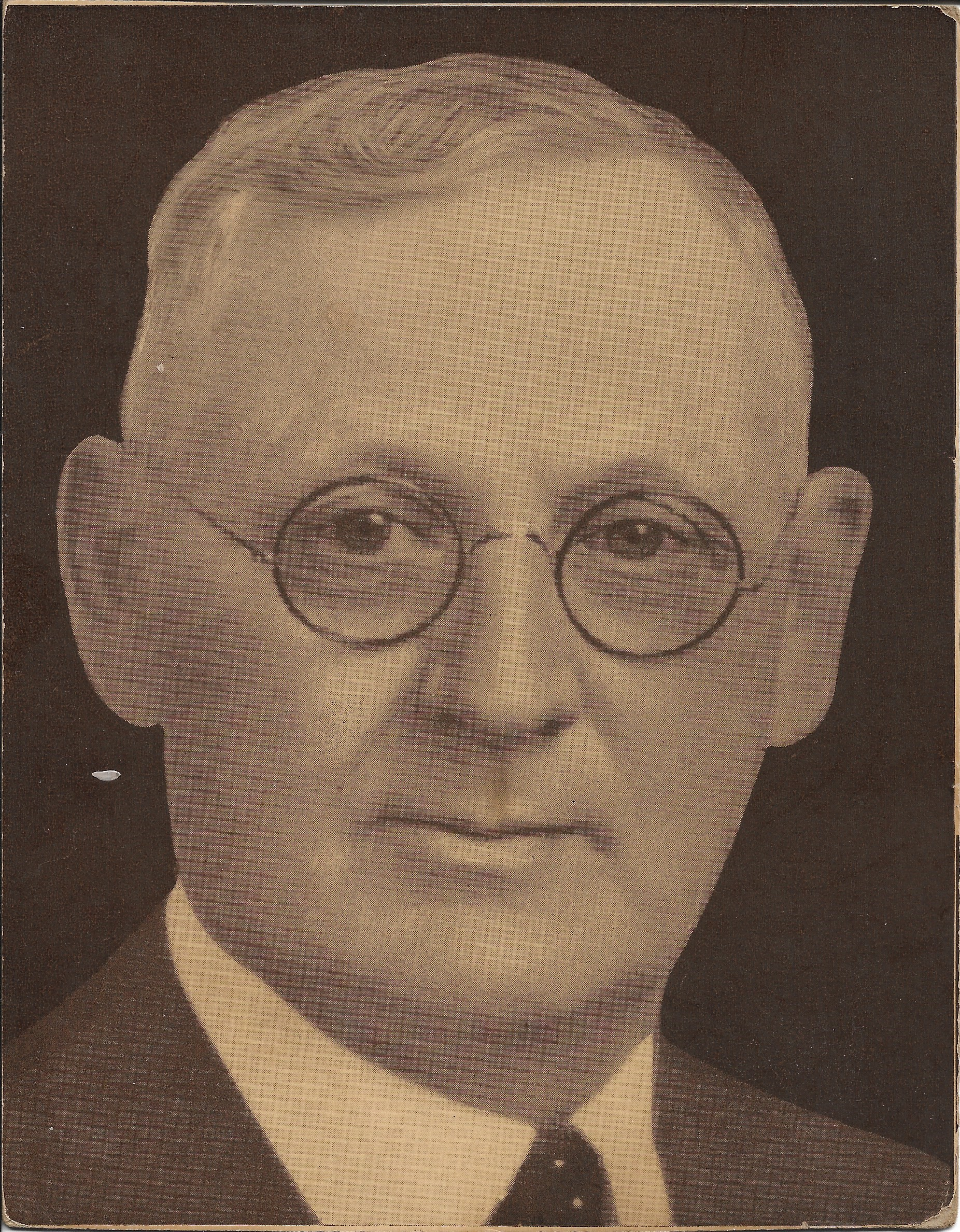
- Walter J. Cookson, Mayor of Worcester, Massachusetts

42nd Mayor of Worcester, Massachusetts
- In office 1936 – June 11, 1936
- Preceded by: John C. Mahoney
- Succeeded by: John S. Sullivan

Personal details
- Born: April 17, 1876 Pascoag, Rhode Island, U.S.
- Died: June 11, 1936 (aged 60) Cleveland, Ohio, U.S.
- Resting place: Hope Cemetery
- Party: Republican

Walter John Cookson (April 17, 1876 – June 11, 1936), Republican politician, was mayor of Worcester, Massachusetts in 1936. Cookson was elected mayor on November 5, 1935 after serving several years on the School Committee. Only a few months after his election, he collapsed and died of a heart attack in his Cleveland hotel room while attending the 1936 Republican National Convention. He was buried in Hope Cemetery in Worcester.

He was the last Republican to serve as Mayor of Worcester. Cookson Field, an 18-acre (73,000 m^{2}) park near Worcester's College of the Holy Cross is named in his honor.
