= Harold Donohue =

American politician

Harold Daniel Donohue
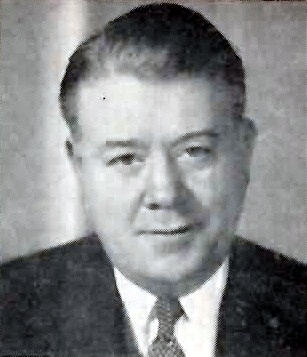

Member of the U.S. House of Representatives from Massachusetts
- In office January 3, 1947 – December 31, 1974
- Preceded by: Pehr G. Holmes
- Succeeded by: Joseph D. Early
- Constituency: 4th district (1947–1973); 3rd district (1973–1974)

Personal details
- Born: June 18, 1901 Worcester, Massachusetts
- Died: November 4, 1984 (aged 83) Worcester, Massachusetts
- Party: Democratic
- Education: Northeastern University School of Law
- Profession: Attorney

Military service
- Allegiance: United States of America
- Branch/service: United States Navy
- Years of service: 1942–1945
- Battles/wars: World War II

Harold Daniel Donohue (June 18, 1901 – November 4, 1984) was an American politician. He represented the third and fourth congressional districts of Massachusetts in the United States House of Representatives from 1947 to 1974.

Donohue was born in Worcester, Massachusetts, on June 18, 1901. He graduated from St. John's High School in 1920 and from Northeastern University School of Law in 1925. He was a lawyer, councilman and alderman in Worcester from 1927 to 1935. Donohue served in the United States Navy between 1942 and 1945.

He was elected as a Democrat to the Eightieth Congress, supplanting an eight-term Republican, and to the thirteen succeeding Congresses (January 3, 1947 - December 31, 1974). In fourteen terms he was successful in enacting only four public bills; they dealt with court procedures, Alaska judges, and the American Bicentennial celebration, which he was instrumental in both establishing and reforming its governance.

During his final congressional term, Donohue was the second ranking Democrat on the Judiciary Committee, which considered articles of impeachment against President Richard M. Nixon for his role in covering up the Watergate scandal. It fell to Donohue to make the motion in the Judiciary Committee to subpoena Pres. Nixon's office audio tapes, and he would introduce the five articles of impeachment that the tapes would mark paid to.

He was not a candidate for reelection to the Ninety-fourth Congress in 1974. He died on November 4, 1984, and was interred in St. John's Cemetery in Worcester.

In 1987, the Harold D. Donohue Federal Building and United States Courthouse was renamed for him.

U.S. House of Representatives
Preceded by Pehr G. Holmes	Member of the U.S. House of Representatives from Massachusetts's 4th congressional district January 3, 1947 – January 3, 1973	Succeeded by Robert Drinan
Preceded by Robert Drinan	Member of the U.S. House of Representatives from Massachusetts's 3rd congressional district January 3, 1973 – December 31, 1974	Succeeded by Joseph D. Early
