= John C. Mahoney (mayor) =

American politician

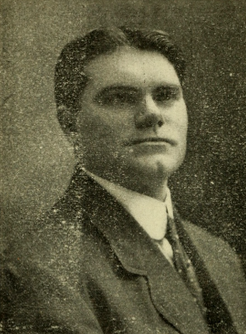

41st Mayor of Worcester, Massachusetts
- In office 1932–1935
- Preceded by: Michael J. O'Hara
- Succeeded by: Walter J. Cookson

Personal details
- Born: March 22, 1881 Cork, Ireland
- Died: July 12, 1946 (aged 65)
- Citizenship: American

John C. Mahoney (March 22, 1881 – July 12, 1946) was an American politician who served as the 41st Mayor of Worcester, Massachusetts from 1932 to 1935.

Mahoney was born in Cork, Ireland on March 22, 1881. He was a lawyer, and a member of the Massachusetts House of Representatives from 1911 to 1914. Mahoney was elected mayor of Worcester in 1932 and served until 1935. His salary as mayor was $7,500. He was a delegate from Massachusetts to the 1932 and 1940 Democratic National Conventions. Mahoney was also a member of the Knights of Columbus, Ancient Order of Hibernians, the Elks, and the Fraternal Order of Eagles.

Mahoney died on July 12, 1946.
