= Elijah B. Stoddard =

American politician

Elijah Brigham Stoddard
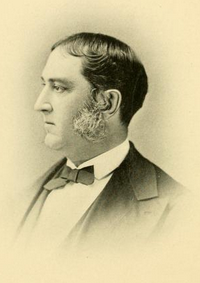

23rd Mayor of Worcester, Massachusetts
- In office January 3, 1882 – January 1, 1883
- Preceded by: Frank H. Kelley
- Succeeded by: Samuel E. Hildreth
- Majority: 1,400

Member of the Massachusetts Executive Council 7th Councilor District
- In office 1871–1872

Member of the Massachusetts Senate
- In office 1864–1865
- Preceded by: Hartley Williams
- Succeeded by: Lucias W. Pond

Member of the Massachusetts House of Representatives
- In office 1857–1863

Member of the Worcester, Massachusetts Board of Aldermen
- In office 1863–1864

Member of the Worcester, Massachusetts Common Council
- In office 1854–1855

Member of the Worcester, Massachusetts Common Council Ward 7
- In office 1858–1859

Personal details
- Born: June 5, 1826 Upton, Massachusetts
- Died: September 27, 1903 Worcester, Massachusetts
- Spouse(s): Mary E. Davis, m. January 16, 1852
- Education: Brown University, 1847
- Occupation: Attorney

Elijah Brigham Stoddard (June 5, 1826 – September 27, 1903) was an attorney and politician who served in both branches of the Massachusetts legislature, as a member of the Massachusetts Executive Council and as the mayor of Worcester, Massachusetts.

== Early life ==
Stoddard was born to Elijah and Zilpah (Nelson) Stoddard in Upton, Massachusetts, on June 5, 1826.

== Family life ==
On January 16, 1852, Stoddard married Mary E. Davis of Worcester.

== Massachusetts state government service ==
=== Massachusetts House of Representatives ===
Stoddard was a member of the Massachusetts House of Representatives in 1856.

=== District Attorney of Worcester County, Massachusetts ===
Stoddard was appointed the District Attorney of Worcester County, Massachusetts, to fill the vacancy caused by the death of John H. Matthews. Stoddard filled out the rest Mathews term but he did not seek election to another term.

=== Massachusetts Senate ===
From 1864 to 1865, Stoddard was a member of the Massachusetts Senate.

He was elected a member of the American Antiquarian Society in 1865.

=== Massachusetts Executive Council ===
From 1871 to 1872 Stoddard was a member of the Massachusetts Executive Council for the Seventh Councilor District.

== Death ==
Stoddard died in Worcester on September 27, 1903.

== Notes ==
Legal offices
Preceded by John H. Matthews	District Attorney for Worcester County, Massachusetts; 1856–1857	Succeeded by Peleg Emory Aldrich
Political offices
Preceded by Frank H. Kelley	23rd Mayor of Worcester, Massachusetts; January 3, 1882-January 1, 1883	Succeeded by Samuel E. Hildreth
