= Henry A. Marsh (politician, born 1836) =

American banker and politician (1836-1914)

Henry Alexander Marsh
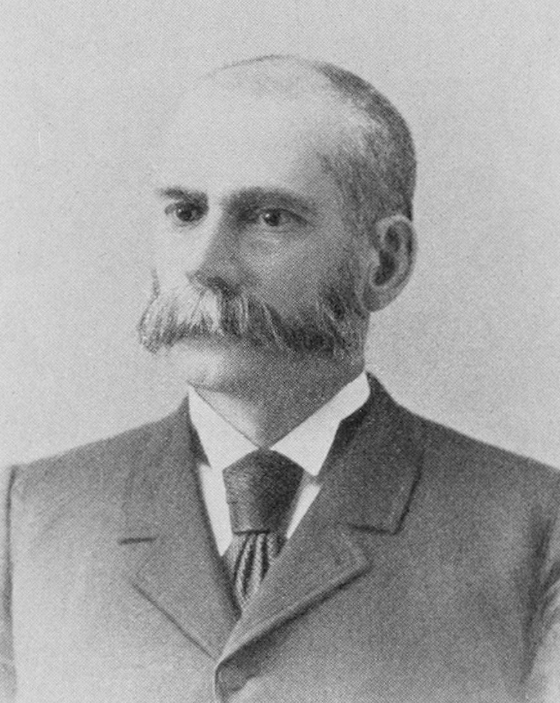

28th Mayor of Worcester, Massachusetts
- In office January 2, 1893 – January 6, 1896
- Preceded by: Francis A. Harrington
- Succeeded by: Augustus B. R. Sprague

President of the Worcester, Massachusetts Board of Aldermen
- In office 1881–1881

Member of the Worcester, Massachusetts Board of Aldermen
- In office 1878–1881

Member of the Worcester, Massachusetts Common Council
- In office 1867–1868

Personal details
- Born: September 7, 1836 Southborough, Massachusetts, US
- Died: November 6, 1914 (aged 78) Worcester, Massachusetts, US
- Party: Republican
- Spouse: Emily W. Mason (m. 1864)
- Occupation: Banker

Henry Alexander Marsh (1836–1914) was an American banker and Republican politician who served as the mayor of Worcester, Massachusetts.

== Early life ==
Marsh was born to Alexander and Maria (Fay) Marsh in Southborough, Massachusetts on September 7, 1836. Marsh moved with his family to Worcester, Massachusetts 1859.

== Education ==
From 1849 to 1852 Marsh went to the Worcester public schools. In 1852 Marsh entered high school, however he soon left High School and continued his studies under the private instruction of Edward Everett Hale.

== Family life ==
Marsh married Emily W. Mason in 1864 they had three children.

== Business career ==
In June 1853 Marsh began working at the Worcester Central Bank as a Clerk, he worked in various positions in that bank and on January 12, 1892, he was elected President of the Central Bank.

== Worcester Common Council ==
Marsh served on the Worcester, Massachusetts Common Council from 1867 to 1868.

== Worcester Board of Aldermen ==
Marsh served on the Worcester, Massachusetts Board of Aldermen from 1878 to 1881, he was President of the Board of Aldermen in 1881.

=== Mayor of Worcester ===
In December, 1892 Marsh was first elected the Mayor of Worcester, Massachusetts, he served from January 2, 1893, to January 6, 1896.

Marsh was elected a member of the American Antiquarian Society in October, 1893.

== Notes ==
Political offices
Preceded by Francis A. Harrington	28th Mayor of Worcester, Massachusetts; January 2, 1893-January 6, 1896	Succeeded by Augustus B. R. Sprague
