= Pehr G. Holmes =

American politician

Pehr Gustaf Holmes
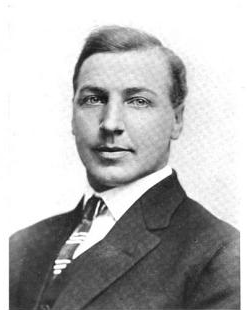

Member of the U.S. House of Representatives from Massachusetts's 4th district
- In office March 4, 1931 – January 3, 1947
- Preceded by: George R. Stobbs
- Succeeded by: Harold Donohue

Member of the Massachusetts Executive Council 7th Councilor District
- In office 1925–1928
- Preceded by: John Addison White
- Succeeded by: Walter E. Schuster

38th Mayor of Worcester, Massachusetts
- In office January 1, 1917 – January 5, 1920
- Preceded by: George Merrill Wright
- Succeeded by: Peter F. Sullivan

Member of the Worcester, Massachusetts Board of Aldermen

Member of the Worcester, Massachusetts Common Council Ward 6

Personal details
- Born: April 9, 1881 Forshaga Municipality, Värmland, Sweden.
- Died: December 19, 1952 (aged 71) Venice, Florida U.S.
- Party: Republican
- Children: G. Everett Holmes
- Occupation: Manufacturer

Pehr Gustaf Holmes (April 9, 1881 – December 19, 1952) was a United States representative from Massachusetts.

== Early life ==
Holmes was born in Mölnbacka in Forshaga Municipality in Värmland, Sweden. In 1886, when he was 4 years old, Holmes immigrated to the United States with his parents, who settled in Worcester, Massachusetts.

== Education ==
Holmes attended the Millbury Street School public school until he was 14.

== Business career ==
When he turned 14 Holmes left school and went to work for the Reed and Prince Manufacturing Co. of Worcester where he "tended machines". Holmes also worked at the Brunell Electroplating plant, where he learned the business of Electroplating. In 1909 Holmes established his own Electroplating firm, the Holmes Electrotype Foundry.

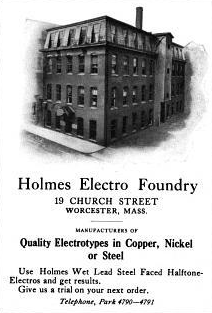
1916 ad showing Holmes Electrotype Foundry in Worcester, Massachusetts.

Holmes also engaged in the banking and insurance business.

== Public service ==
=== Worcester Common Council and Board of Aldermen ===
Holmes was elected member of the Worcester Common Council from Ward 6. In 1913 Holmes became a member of the Worcester Board of Aldermen, serving as its president.

=== Mayor of Worcester ===
Holmes was inaugurated mayor of Worcester on January 1, 1917, he served as mayor until January 5, 1920.

=== Massachusetts Governor's Council ===
Holmes served as a member of the Massachusetts Executive Council, Seventh Councilor district from 1925 to 1928.

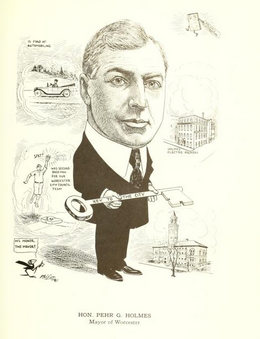
Caricature of Holmes from 1917, when he was the Mayor of Worcester, Massachusetts.

=== United States House of Representatives ===
Holmes was elected as a Republican to the 72nd United States Congress and to the seven succeeding Congresses from (March 4, 1931 – January 3, 1947). Holmes was an unsuccessful candidate for reelection in 1946 to the 80th United States Congress.

Holmes returned to Worcester and his electrotype business. Holmes died in Venice, Florida; his interment was in the Old Swedish Cemetery in Worcester.

== Sources ==
- United States Congress. "Pehr G. Holmes (id: H000741)". Biographical Directory of the United States Congress.
- Members of the House who were born in foreign countries

== Related reading ==
- Swedes of Greater Worcester Revisited (by Eric J. Salomonsson, William O. Hultgren, and Philip C. Becker. Arcadia Publishing. 2005)

== Notes ==
Political offices
Preceded by George Merrill Wright	38th Mayor of Worcester, Massachusetts; January 1, 1917–January 5, 1920	Succeeded by Peter F. Sullivan
Preceded by John Addison White	Member of the Massachusetts Executive Council; 7th Councilor District; 1925–1928	Succeeded by Walter E. Schuster
U.S. House of Representatives
Preceded by George R. Stobbs	Member of the U.S. House of Representatives from Massachusetts's 4th congressional district March 4, 1931 – January 3, 1947	Succeeded by Harold Donohue
