= James Logan (mayor) =

American politician (1852–1929)

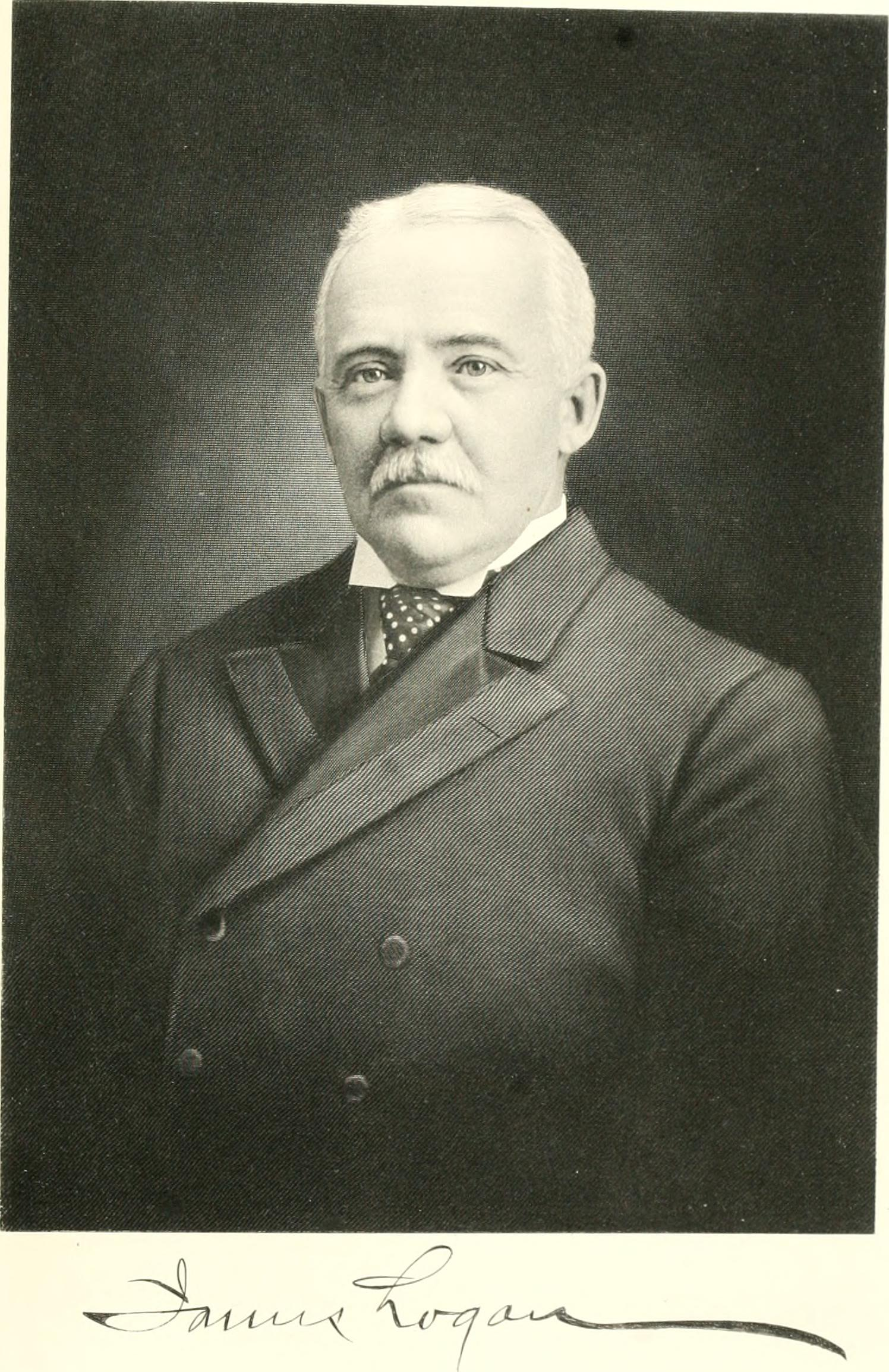
- Logan in a 1907 publication

35th Mayor of Worcester, Massachusetts
- In office 1908–1911
- Preceded by: John T. Duggan
- Succeeded by: David F. O'Connell

Personal details
- Born: May 6, 1852 Glasgow, Scotland
- Died: November 30, 1929 (aged 77)
- Resting place: Hope Cemetery; Worcester, Massachusetts, U.S.
- Party: Republican

James Logan (May 6, 1852 – November 30, 1929) was a Scottish-born American politician who served as the 35th Mayor of Worcester, Massachusetts from 1908 to 1911. The Logan family was an old family in Scotland, dating back to 1200 in Wigtownshire, Ayrshire, Lanarkshire, and Edinburghshire.

== Life and career ==
James Logan was born in Glasgow, Scotland on May 6, 1852. He was three months old when his family came to the United States. As a child, he worked in Parkhurst Woolen Mill at Valley Falls. When he was twelve, his arm was caught in a machine and broke in three places. His arm never recovered to full strength and usefulness, and now handicapped as a mill operative, he was forced to seek other employment.

In 1907, Logan was elected mayor of Worcester, his total vote being larger than any other candidate previously who hadn't run uncontested. Throughout his terms as mayor, Logan became popular as a great orator. He advocated the building of branch libraries financed by Andrew Carnegie.

For several years, he was a president of the Worcester County Mechanic's Association, and of the Young Men's Christian Association. Logan was also a member of the Worcester Society of Antiquity, and of the Montacute Lodge, Free and Accepted Masons.

Logan died on November 30, 1929. He was buried in Hope Cemetery in Worcester.
