= Daniel Waldo Lincoln =

American politician

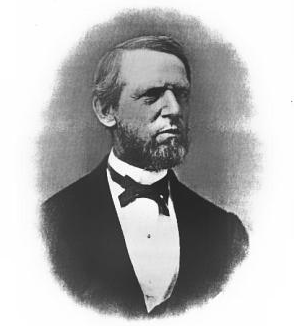

13th Mayor of Worcester, Massachusetts
- In office January 3, 1863 – January 2, 1866
- Preceded by: Peleg Emory Aldrich
- Succeeded by: Phinehas Ball

Personal details
- Born: January 16, 1813 Worcester, Massachusetts, US
- Died: July 1, 1880 (aged 67) Worcester, Massachusetts, US
- Resting place: Rural Cemetery; Worcester, Massachusetts
- Parent: Levi Lincoln Jr. (father)
- Relatives: Levi Lincoln Sr. (grandfather)

Daniel Waldo Lincoln (January 16, 1813 – July 1, 1880) was an American politician from Worcester, Massachusetts. He was the 13th Mayor of Worcester from 1863 to 1866. He also served as president of the Boston and Albany Railroad.

== Life and career ==
Daniel Waldo Lincoln was born in Worcester, Massachusetts on January 16, 1813, the son of thirteenth Governor of Massachusetts Levi Lincoln Jr. and Penelope Winslow Sever Lincoln. Lincoln married Frances Frisk Merrick in 1841, and had four children.

Lincoln served as the 13th Mayor of Worcester from 1863 to 1866. He was also a president of the Boston and Albany Railroad and the Worcester County Horticultural Society.

He died on July 1, 1880, in a railroad accident.
