= John S.C. Knowlton =

American politician

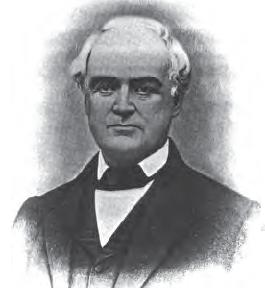

15th Sheriff of Worcester County, Massachusetts
- In office 1857–1871
- Preceded by: George W. Richardson
- Succeeded by: Augustus B. R. Sprague

4th Mayor of Worcester, Massachusetts
- In office January 3, 1853 – January 1, 1855
- Preceded by: Peter C. Bacon
- Succeeded by: George W. Richardson

Member of the Massachusetts Senate
- In office 1852–1853

Personal details
- Born: John Stocker Coffin Knowlton; December 11, 1798 Hopkinton, New Hampshire
- Died: June 11, 1871 (aged 72) Worcester, Massachusetts
- Party: Democratic
- Spouse: Anna W. Hartwell
- Education: Dartmouth
- Alma mater: Phillips Andover, Dartmouth College

John Stocker Coffin Knowlton (December 11, 1798 – June 11, 1871) was an American newspaper editor, publisher and politician who served in both branches of the Massachusetts legislature, as the Mayor of Worcester, Massachusetts, and as the Sheriff of Worcester County, Massachusetts.

== Biography ==
Knowlton was born in Hopkinton, New Hampshire to Daniel Knowlton and Mary Stocker. Knowlton attended Hopkinton and Phillips Andover academies, and graduated from Dartmouth College in 1823.

Knowlton married Anna W. Hartwell, of Littleton, Massachusetts on September 17, 1829. He died in Worcester on June 11, 1871.

== Positions held ==
- School teacher, Beverly, Massachusetts
- Editor of the Lowell Journal, Lowell, Massachusetts
- Editor and publisher of the Palladium, Worcester, Massachusetts from 1830 to 1871
- Elector, United States Electoral College in 1856 United States presidential election
- Massachusetts State Senator from 1852 to 1853
- Mayor of the city of Worcester, Massachusetts from January 3, 1853 to January 1, 1855
- High Sheriff of Worcester County from 1857 to 1871.

== Notes ==
Political offices
Preceded by	Member of the Massachusetts State Senate; 1852 - 1853	Succeeded by
Preceded by George W. Richardson	4th Mayor of Worcester, Massachusetts; January 3, 1853- January 1, 1855	Succeeded by Peter C. Bacon
Preceded by George W. Richardson	15th Sheriff of Worcester County, Massachusetts; 1857–1871	Succeeded by Augustus B. R. Sprague
