= Peter C. Bacon =

American lawyer

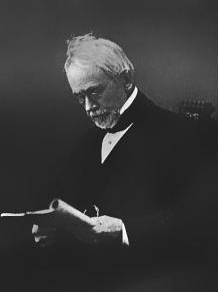

3rd Mayor of Worcester, Massachusetts
- In office April 1, 1849 – April 7, 1851
- Preceded by: Henry Chapin
- Succeeded by: John S.C. Knowlton

Personal details
- Born: Peter Child Bacon; November 11, 1804 Dudley, Massachusetts
- Died: February 7, 1886 (aged 81)
- Party: Free Soil
- Education: Brown University; class of 1827
- Profession: Attorney

Peter Child Bacon (November 11, 1804 – February 7, 1886) was an attorney who served as the third Mayor of Worcester, Massachusetts, USA.

== Biography ==
Bacon was born on November 11, 1804. He graduated from Brown University in 1827. Bacon studied law at the New Haven Law School, and with the law firm of Davis & Allen of Worcester.

In 1839, Bacon was admitted the bar at Worcester, County. He practiced law for two years in Dudley, Massachusetts and twelve years in Oxford, Massachusetts after which he moved to Worcester.

He was elected a member of the American Antiquarian Society in 1860.

== Notes ==
Political offices
Preceded by Henry Chapin	3rd Mayor of Worcester, Massachusetts; April 1, 1849-April 7, 1851	Succeeded by John S.C. Knowlton
