= Walter H. Blodgett =

American politician (1850–1923)

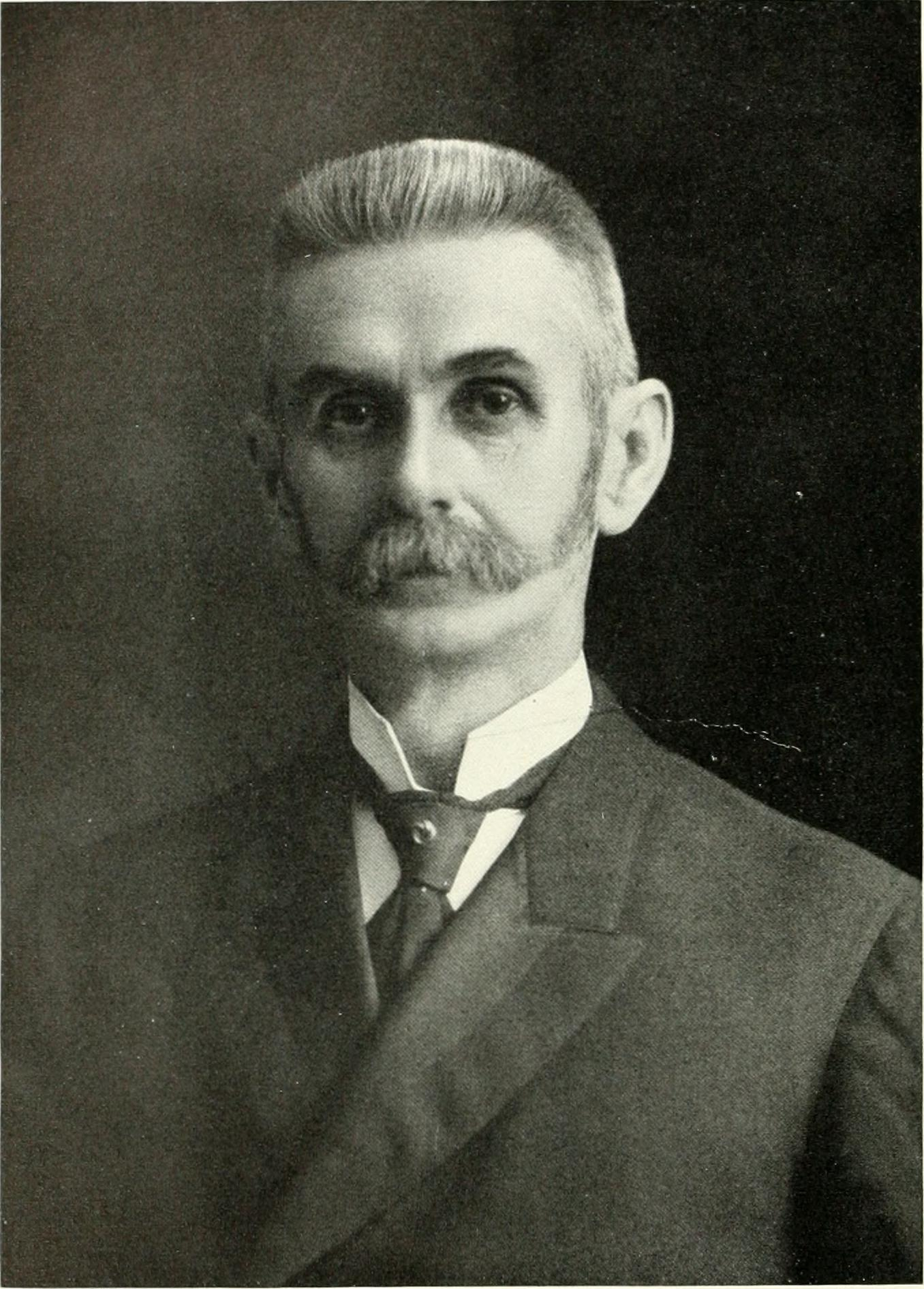

33rd Mayor of Worcester, Massachusetts
- In office 1904–1905
- Preceded by: Edward F. Fletcher
- Succeeded by: John T. Duggan

Personal details
- Born: November 2, 1850 Denmark, New York, US
- Died: January 6, 1923 (aged 72) Worcester, Massachusetts, US
- Party: Republican

Walter Harrison Blodgett (November 2, 1850 – January 6, 1923) was an American politician who served as the 33rd Mayor of Worcester, Massachusetts from 1904 to 1905.

== Life and career ==
Walter H. Blodgett was born in Denmark, New York, on November 2, 1850. He was the youngest of six children and spent his early life in Denmark, until moving to Worcester in 1881, opening a wholesale produce store.

In 1903, Blodgett was elected mayor of Worcester, winning by a significant margin.

Blodgett died in Worcester on January 6, 1923.
