= George A. Wells (politician) =

American politician (1910–1979)

Mayor of Worcester, Massachusetts
- In office 1970–1970
- Preceded by: John M. Shea
- Succeeded by: Joseph M. Tinsley
- In office 1965–1965
- Preceded by: Paul V. Mullaney
- Succeeded by: Joseph C. Casdin

Member of the Massachusetts Governor's Council from the 7th District
- In office 1955–1957
- Preceded by: Gabriel G. Morze
- Succeeded by: Michael Favulli
- In office 1951–1953
- Preceded by: John J. O'Brien
- Succeeded by: Gabriel G. Morze

Member of the Worcester, Massachusetts City Council
- In office 1950–1976

Member of the Worcester, Massachusetts Board of Aldermen
- In office 1948–1950

Personal details
- Born: October 7, 1910 Worcester, Massachusetts
- Died: October 18, 1979 (aged 69)
- Resting place: Worcester County Memorial Park
- Party: Democratic

George A. Wells (October 7, 1910 – October 18, 1979) was an American politician who served 13 terms on the Worcester, Massachusetts, city council and was a member of the Massachusetts Governor's Council.

== Early life ==
Wells was born on October 7, 1910, in Worcester. He attended public grammar school in Worcester and graduated from St. Stephen's High School. He served three years in the United States Army during World War II. After the war, Wells published Worcester Yank, a weekly magazine for veterans and ran a public relations firm.

== Political career ==
In 1947, Wells was elected to the Worcester Board of Aldermen. During his first term he accused the city librarian of being a communist, which led to backlash for Wells. In 1949, the city switched to a new form of government and Wells was elected to the first of his thirteen terms as a city councilor.

In 1950, Wells became the first Democrat elected to represent the 7th District on the Massachusetts Governor's Council. He was defeated for reelection in 1952 by Gabriel G. Morze, but regained his seat in 1954. In 1955 opposed state treasurer John F. Kennedy's nomination of his brother, James A. Kennedy, as his third deputy. James Kennedy challenged Wells to an “intelligence test” and the former labor defeated Wells by achieving a score of 99 out of 99 to Wells' 98 out of 99. In 1956, Wells was a candidate for Lieutenant Governor of Massachusetts. He finished third in the Democratic primary behind Robert F. Murphy and James A. Burke. In 1957, Wells was appointed deputy state commissioner of commerce. In this role, he was responsible for promoting tourism in Massachusetts.

Wells was a delegate to the 1960 Democratic National Convention, which nominated Massachusetts' John F. Kennedy as president. The convention band was unable to find a song that identified Kennedy with his home state and on his way home, Wells wrote The Great State of Massachusetts. J. Earl Bley, a musician friend of Wells, wrote the music. On November 24, 1997, The Great State of Massachusetts was designated the state glee club song of Massachusetts by the Massachusetts General Court.

In 1966 and 1970, Wells was chosen by his fellow city councilors to serve as Mayor of Worcester, a largely ceremonial position under the city charter. Wells remained active in politics after retiring from the council. In 1979 he and city councilor Jordan Levy announced plans to form an association that would oppose the fluoridation of the city’s water. Wells died on October 18, 1979.
