= List of mayors and city managers of Worcester, Massachusetts =

City Seal of Worcester, Massachusetts

This is an incomplete list of mayors and city managers of Worcester, Massachusetts.

#	Image	Mayor	Term	Notes
1		Levi Lincoln Jr.	April 17, 1848 – April 1, 1849	
2		Henry Chapin	April 1, 1849 – April 7, 1851	
3		Peter C. Bacon	April 7, 1851 – January 3, 1853	
4		John S.C. Knowlton	January 3, 1853 – January 1, 1855	
5		George W. Richardson	January 1, 1855 – January 7, 1856	
6		Isaac Davis	January 7, 1856 – January 5, 1857	
7		George W. Richardson	January 5, 1857 – January 4, 1858	
8		Isaac Davis	January 4, 1858 – January 3, 1859	
9		Alexander Bullock	January 3, 1859 – January 2, 1860	
10		William W. Rice	January 2, 1860 – January 7, 1861	
11		Isaac Davis	January 7, 1861 – January 6, 1862	
12		Peleg Emory Aldrich	January 6, 1862 – January 3, 1863	Later served as an associate justice of the Massachusetts Superior Court.
13		Daniel Waldo Lincoln	January 3, 1863 – January 2, 1865	
14		Phinehas Ball	January 2, 1865 – January 1, 1866	
15		James B. Blake	January 1, 1866 – December 18, 1870	Died in office.
A		Henry Chapin	December 19, 1870 – January 1, 1871	Elected Mayor, ad interim, by the City Council, in joint convention, December 19, 1870.
16		Edward Earle	February 6, 1871 – January 1, 1871	Elected mayor in a special election to finish Mayor Blake's term.
17		George F. Verry	January 1, 1872 – January 6, 1873	
18		Clark Jillson	January 6, 1873 – January 5, 1874	
19		Edward Livingston Davis	January 5, 1874 – January 4, 1875	
20		Clark Jillson	January 4, 1875 – January 1, 1877	
21		Charles B. Pratt	January 1, 1877 – January 5, 1880	
22		Frank H. Kelley	January 5, 1880 – January 3, 1882	
23		Elijah B. Stoddard	January 3, 1882 – January 1, 1883	
24		Samuel E. Hildreth	January 1, 1883 – January 7, 1884	
25		Charles G. Reed	January 7, 1884 – January 4, 1886	
26		Samuel Winslow	January 4, 1886 – January 6, 1890	
27		Francis A Harrington	January 6, 1890 – January 2, 1893	Previously served in the Board of Aldermen of Worcester.
28		Henry A. Marsh	January 2, 1893 – January 6, 1896	
29		Augustus B. R. Sprague	January 6, 1896 – January 3, 1898	
30		Rufus B. Dodge Jr.	January 3, 1898 – February 25, 1901	
31		Philip J. O'Connell	1901	
32		Edward F. Fletcher	1902–1903	
33		Walter H. Blodgett	1904–1905	
34		John T. Duggan	1906–1907	
35		James Logan	1908–1911	
36		David F. O'Connell	1912	
37		George Merrill Wright	January 6, 1913 – January 1, 1917	
38		Pehr G. Holmes	January 1, 1917 – January 5, 1920	
39		Peter F. Sullivan	January 5, 1920 – 1923	
40		Michael J. O'Hara	1924–1931	
41		John C. Mahoney	1932–1935	
42		Walter J. Cookson	1936 – June 11, 1936	
A		William A. Bennett	1936	As president of the board of Aldermen, became acting mayor following Cookson's death.
43		John S. Sullivan	1936–1937	
44		William A. Bennett	1938–1945	Elected Sheriff of Worcester County, Massachusetts.
A		John H. Toomey Jr.	1945	As president of the board of Aldermen, became acting mayor upon the resignation of William A. Bennett.
45		Charles F. "Jeff" Sullivan	1946–1949	Elected Lt. Governor of Massachusetts. Last Mayor before the City Manager form of government was established under a Massachusetts Plan E Charter.
46		Andrew B. Holmstrom	1950–1953	First Appointed Mayor. Beginning of the weak Mayor system.
47		James D. O'Brien	1954–1958	
48		Joseph C. Casdin	1959	
49		James D. O'Brien	1960–1961	
50		John M. Shea	1962	
51		Joseph C. Casdin	1962–1963	
52		Paul V. Mullaney	1963–1965	
53		George A. Wells	1966	
54		Joseph C. Casdin	1967–1968	
55		John M. Shea	1969	
56		George A. Wells	1970	
57		Joseph M. Tinsley	1971	
58		Thomas J. Early	1972	
59		Joseph M. Tinsley	1973	
60		Israel Katz	1974–1975	
61		Thomas J. Early	1976–1979	
62		Jordan Levy	1980–1981	
63		Sara Robertson	1982–1983	
64		Joseph M. Tinsley	1984–1985	
65		John B. Anderson	1986	
66		Timothy J. Cooney Jr.	1987	Last appointed mayor
67		Jordan Levy	1988–1993	First popularly elected mayor under new charter
68		Raymond Mariano	1994–2001	
69		Timothy Murray	2002 – January 9, 2007	Elected Lt. Governor of Massachusetts.
70		Konstantina Lukes	January 10, 2007 – January 4, 2010	
71		Joseph C. O'Brien	January 4, 2010 – January 2, 2012	
72		Joseph Petty	January 2, 2012 – Present	

== City managers ==
#	City Manager	Term	Notes
1st	Everett F. Merrill	1950–1951	
2nd	Francis J. McGrath	1951–1985	
3rd	William Mulford	1985–1993	
4th	Thomas R. Hoover	1993–2004	
5th	Michael V. O'Brien	2004–2014	
6th	Edward M. Augustus Jr.	2014–2022	
7th	Eric Batista	2022–present	

== See also ==
- Mayoral elections in Worcester, Massachusetts
