= LXII Corps =

LXII Corps or 62nd Corps may refer to:

- 62nd Corps (German Empire)
- LXII Army Corps, Wehrmacht, Germany
- 62nd Rifle Corps, Soviet Union

== See also ==
- List of military corps by number
- 62nd Brigade (disambiguation)
- 62nd Division (disambiguation)
- 62nd Regiment (disambiguation)
- 62nd (disambiguation)
