= 62nd Cavalry =

62nd Cavalry may refer to:

- 62nd Cavalry (India)
- 62nd Cavalry Division (Soviet Union), a Soviet division
- 62nd Cavalry Division (United States)
- 62nd (Middlesex) Company, Imperial Yeomanry

== See also ==
- 62nd Division (disambiguation)
- 62nd Brigade (disambiguation)
- 62nd Regiment (disambiguation)
- 62nd (disambiguation)
