= Gookin =

Gookin may refer to:

- Daniel Gookin (1612–1687) was a settler of Virginia and Massachusetts, and a writer on the subject of American Indians.
- Charles Gookin (c. 1660–c. 1723) was a deputy governor of colonial Pennsylvania.
- Daniel Gookin (d. 1743), first sheriff of Worcester County, Massachusetts.
- Robert Gookin (died 1666/7), an Anglo-Irishman who served as a captain in the English Parliamentary army in Ireland
- Vincent Gookin (disambiguation)
