= Robert H. Chamberlain =

Robert Horace Chamberlain
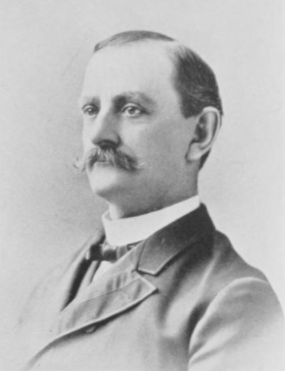

19th Sheriff of Worcester County, Massachusetts
- In office 1892 – January 14, 1910
- Preceded by: Samuel D. Nye
- Succeeded by: Benjamin D. Dwinnell

Deputy Sheriff of Worcester County, Massachusetts and keeper of the House of Correction
- In office 1888–1890
- Appointed by: Augustus B. R. Sprague

Deputy Sheriff of Worcester County, Massachusetts and keeper of the House of Correction
- In office 1888–1892
- Appointed by: Samuel D. Nye

Superintendent of Sewers for The City of Worcester, Massachusetts
- In office 1870–1888
- Appointed by: James B. Blake

Member of the Worcester, Massachusetts Common Council Ward 3
- In office 1869–1870

Personal details
- Born: June 16, 1838 Worcester, Massachusetts
- Died: June 28, 1910 (aged 72) Worcester, Massachusetts
- Party: Republican
- Spouse: Esther Browning (m. 1865)
- Occupation: Law enforcement officer Corrections officer Politician

Military service
- Allegiance: (United States) United States; Union
- Branch/service: United States Army; Union Army
- Years of service: September 25, 1862-July 27, 1863 (Company A) 51st Mass. Enlisted as a Sergeant; (9 month enlistment); July 20, 1864-November 30, 1864 Company F; 60th Mass. Enlisted as a lieutenant; promoted to captain
- Rank: Sergeant; (Company A) 51st Mass. Lieutenant; Captain (Company F) 60th Mass.
- Unit: Company A; 51st Regiment Massachusetts Volunteer Infantry; Company F; 60th Mass.
- Battles/wars: American Civil War: Battle of Kinston; Battle of Whitehall; Battle of Goldsborough Bridge

Robert Horace Chamberlain (June 16, 1838 – June 28, 1910) was an American law enforcement officer, machinist, military officer and politician who served as the eighteenth Sheriff of Worcester County, Massachusetts.

== Early life ==
Chamberlain was born in Worcester, Massachusetts on June 16, 1838. He was educated in public schools, and apprenticed as a machinist.

When the Civil War broke out, he enlisted in the 51st Massachusetts Infantry Regiment, and was promoted from private to sergeant. He reenlisted in the 60th Regiment and was commissioned captain of Company F.

He went on to serve as a brigadier general in the Massachusetts militia until 1876.

== Family life ==
On January 10, 1865 Chamberlain married Esther Browning of Hubbardston, Massachusetts, they had two daughters – Flora B. (Chamberlain) Weatherby and Mabel S. Chamberlain.

== Worcester County Sheriff ==
In the fall of 1891, Chamberlain, after winning a lively caucus, was elected Worcester County Sheriff. Chamberlain resigned the Sheriff's position on January 14, 1910.

== Death ==
Chamberlain died at his home in Worcester on June 28, 1910.

== Notes ==
Political offices
Preceded by Samuel D. Nye	18th Sheriff of Worcester County, Massachusetts; 1892 – June 28, 1910	Succeeded by Benjamin D. Dwinnell
