= 62nd =

62nd is the ordinal form of the number 62. 62nd or Sixty-second may also refer to:

- A fraction, 1/62, equal to one of 62 equal parts

== Geography ==
- 62nd meridian east, a line of longitude
- 62nd meridian west, a line of longitude
- 62nd parallel north, a circle of latitude
- 62nd parallel south, a circle of latitude
- 62nd Street (Manhattan)
- 62nd Street Bridge, across the Allegheny River in Pennsylvania

== Military ==
- 62nd Army
- 62nd Brigade (disambiguation)
- 62nd Division (disambiguation)
- 62nd Regiment (disambiguation)

== Other ==
- 62nd century
- 62nd century BC

== See also ==
- 62 (disambiguation)
- Sixty seconds, unit of time also known as a minute
- 60 Seconds, BBC news programme
- 60 Seconds!, video game
