= John Chandler (sheriff) =

American judge and sheriff (1693–1762)

Chief Judge of Probate for Worcester County, Massachusetts

Judge of Probate for Worcester County, Massachusetts
- In office May 1754 – May 1757
- Preceded by: John Chandler Sr.

3rd Sheriff of Worcester County, Massachusetts
- In office June 21, 1751 – August 7, 1762
- Preceded by: Benjamin Flagg
- Succeeded by: Gardner Chandler

Town Treasurer of the Town of Worcester, Massachusetts
- In office 1741–1752
- Succeeded by: John Chandler, III

Member of the Massachusetts House of Representatives from Worcester, Massachusetts
- In office 1732, 1738, 1752 – 1735, 1739, 1753

Member of the Massachusetts House of Representatives from Worcester, Massachusetts
- In office 1732, 1739, 1752 – 1735, 1739, 1753

Member of the Massachusetts House of Representatives from Woodstock, Massachusetts

Moderator of the Worcester, Massachusetts Town Meeting
- In office 1733–1733

Corner of Suffolk County, Massachusetts

Personal details
- Born: October 18, 1693 New London, Connecticut
- Died: August 10, 1762 (aged 68)
- Resting place: Worcester Common.
- Occupation: Surveyor; Law Enforcement Officer; Politician; Judge

John Chandler (October 18, 1693 - August 10, 1762) was a judge of probate and the third sheriff of Worcester County, Massachusetts. He was also an American politician judge and soldier.

Chandler was appointed the sheriff of Worcester County, Massachusetts, on June 21, 1751.

== Early life ==
Coat of Arms of John Chandler

Chandler was born in New London, Connecticut, on October 18, 1693; but moved to Worcester County in the Province of Massachusetts Bay about 1731. He was the son of John Chandler (1665-1743) and Mary Raymond (1672-1711). His father John was one of six people of "The Mashaoquet Purchase" in the Connecticut Colony, which 1500 acres was purchased from those Native Americans in the United States. On September 28, 1691, he was on a Committee to build a meeting house on Plain Hill in Woodstock, Connecticut. On November 26, 1694, he was Town Moderator Woodstock and then Deacon of the Church of Woodstock. His grandfather William Chandler immigrated in 1635 from England. Col. John Chandler's sons, John, William, Samuel and Thomas were also politicians and soldiers.

== Military ==
On April 3, 1703, held the rank of major and in 1722 was written a letter describing the beginning of the French and Indian War. " In 1722 he peace of the country was disturbed by the renewal of hostilities by the Eastern Indians, and resulted in the war or fight that derives its distinctive appellation from Lovell, it's hero and martyr. The native tribes of Massachusetts had ceased to be formidable; but the incursion of the allies of the French from Canada spread alarm along the exposed frontier, and rendered military forces necessary for the security of the settlements. Worcester in 1722 furnished five men for the country's service in the Company of Scouts under Maj. John Chandler. Two were posted at Leicester, and two others under Sergeant Benj. Flagg, kept garrison in Worcester or ranged the woods." Chandler responded with the following...

"Honored Sir - - Through Gods goodness the Indians have made no attack upon us as yet. [but] we are under Surprising fears of it. We reed the Caution from your honor. with the late intelligence of the Indians coming over the Lake: also we hear the late mischief done in Hatfield, and just now. we have a post from Rutland with account fo continual discoveries of the Enemy. and last night our Town as alarmed by discovering an Indian, So this day Sunday we have but a thin meeting. Our Town is not only very much Exposed. being so near the Enemy. but we are no way Capable of defending ourselves. We have Expectation of your honor to be a father to us. We now have five of our Soldiers at Rutland. We are informed that we are allowed ten Soldiers."

In Jun 1724 he held the rank of colonel and writes, "I am sorry that the poor people of Worcester. Leicester and Brimfield find themselves mistaken in having men allowed them to scout and guard said towns. I pray your honors considerations," &c. "for the Encouragement of whom I shall always be ready to obey such orders as your honors shall be pleased to give."

In July 1724 he Col. Chandler was ordered to recruit twenty men for "frontier service," his actions may have saved the town of Worcesters. He wrote on August 7, 1724 "An Indian was discovered from a garrison house and fired on by the guard. A soldier and a boy being out near the meadow, spied an Indian nearer to the garrison than they were. The boy ran away. The soldier presented his gun and was ready to fire when two more rose up by his side; Whereupon he did not venture to fire. but fled; and both came safe to the garrison. During the night their noises were heard, crying as Wolves. They people made an alarm, and the Indians beat upon a deserted house drumming violently upon its sides, and so went off."

== Politician in Massachusetts ==
His father, John Chandler was elected on November 27, 1690, the first Town Clerk and again on March 8, 1692/93. He was then chosen the first Selectman of Woodstock and again in 1693/94 and then chosen Commissioner of the Peace for almost forty years and seven years on His Majesty's Council. From 1693 to 1694 he was on the Town Committee in Woodstock, Connecticut and in 1694 he was elected Selectmen of Woodstock. From April 3, 1703, he was elected Surveyor of Woodstock and in 1711 he was elected Representative from Woodstock, Connecticut to the Massachusetts General Court; he received a thank you letter from Boston for his public service "To his wisdom and prudence the order and regularity of Woodstock (under God) had been vastly owing. On 31 May 1699, Col. Chandler was created Judge by the Chief Justice of Massachusetts. On April 2, 1731, the Massachusetts Legislature officially incorporated Worcester County and the very Judge John Chandler held the first Probate Court of Worcester County on July 13, 1731, and the first Court of Common Please and General Sessions on August 10, 1731. In 1754 Chandler was a delegate to the Albany Congress.

== Death and burial ==
Chandler died on August 10, 1762, he was buried in the Worcester Common.

== Notes ==
Political offices
Preceded by Benjamin Flagg	3rd Sheriff of Worcester County, Massachusetts; June 21, 1751-August 7, 1762	Succeeded by Gardner Chandler
