= Ansel Dyer Wass =

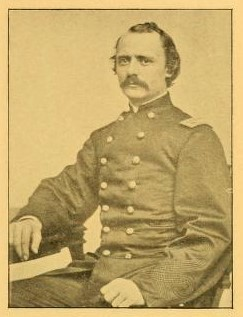
- Born: November 12, 1832; Addison, Maine
- Died: January 24, 1889 (aged 56); Boston, Massachusetts
- Burial place: Evergreen Cemetery, Portland, Maine
- Military career
- Allegiance: United States of America
- Branch: United States Army; Union Army
- Service years: 1861–1865
- Rank: Colonel; Brevet Brigadier General
- Commands: Company K, 19th Massachusetts Infantry Regiment; 19th Massachusetts Infantry Regiment; 60th Massachusetts Infantry Regiment; 62nd Massachusetts Infantry Regiment; 3rd brigade, 2nd division, II Corps (temporary)
- Conflicts: American Civil War
- Other work: Agent, Boston Custom House

Ansel Dyer Wass (November 12, 1832 – January 24, 1889) was a Union Army officer during the American Civil War. Wass was born in Addison, Maine on November 12, 1832.

== Civil War service ==
Wass was working as a clerk in a counting room when the Civil War began. He enlisted as a first lieutenant on April 22, 1861, with the 6th Massachusetts Militia and served with that unit until the end of its term of service on August 2, 1861. On August 28, 1861, he was commissioned captain of the "Tiger Zouaves," a state militia company which became Company K of the 19th Massachusetts Infantry. He held that command until July 1, 1862, serving with the regiment as part of the Army of the Potomac during the Peninsular Campaign. He was then assigned to the 41st Massachusetts Infantry on July 1, 1862, promoted to major, and later promoted to lieutenant colonel on September 6, 1862. He served with the 41st Massachusetts in Louisiana until he resigned his commission on January 31, 1863.

On May 23, 1863, Wass was appointed lieutenant colonel of his former regiment, the 19th Massachusetts Infantry. He was severely wounded during Pickett's Charge on July 3, 1863, at the Battle of Gettysburg. On October 14, 1863, was given temporary command of the 3rd brigade, 2nd division of the II Corps which he led during the Battle of Bristoe Station. He was wounded a second time during this battle. He was promoted to colonel and commanding officer of the 19th Massachusetts on February 28, 1864, a post which he held until the regiment was mustered out on July 28, 1864. On August 6, 1864, Col. Wass was appointed commanding officer of a new regiment, the 60th Massachusetts Infantry. The regiment served first in Maryland to guard railroad lines and later was transferred to Indianapolis to deal with the threat of organized Confederate sympathizers in that region. After the close of the 60th Massachusetts Infantry's term of service, Wass was appointed colonel of the 62nd Massachusetts Infantry on March 2, 1865, despite poor health due to his long service and wounds. The war ended before the 62nd Massachusetts could take the field.

On May 4, 1866, President Andrew Johnson nominated Wass for appointment to the grade of brevet brigadier general of volunteers, to rank from March 13, 1865, and the United States Senate confirmed the appointment on May 18, 1866.

== Post-war career ==
Wass was a United States Customs Service agent after the war. He died in Boston, Massachusetts on January 23, 1889. He was buried in Evergreen Cemetery (Portland, Maine).

== See also ==
- List of American Civil War brevet generals (Union)
