= List of sheriffs of Worcester County, Massachusetts =

This is a list of sheriffs of Worcester County, Massachusetts. The sheriff originally was an appointed office, it has been an elected position since 1856. The sheriff is elected to serve a six-year term.

The current Worcester County Sheriff is Lewis Evangelidis

No.	Sheriff	Picture	Term	Party	Note
1	Daniel Gookin		June 30, 1731 – June 1743		
2	Benjamin Flagg		1743–1751		
3	John Chandler		1751 – August 7, 1762		
4	Gardner Chandler		1762–1775		Last Worcester County sheriff of the royal Province of Massachusetts Bay.
5	Simon Dwight		1775–1778		
6	William Greenleaf		1778–1788		Impeached and removed for misconduct.
7	John Sprague		1788–1792		
8	Dwight Foster		1792–1793	Federalist	
9	William Caldwell		1793–1805		
10	Thomas Walker Ward		1805–1824		
11	Calvin Willard		1824–1844		Resigned rather than hang a condemned prisoner.
12	John W. Lincoln		1844–1851		
13	James Estabrook		1851–1853	Democratic	
14	George W. Richardson		1854–1856	Know Nothing	
15	John S.C. Knowlton		1857–June 11, 1871	Democratic	First sheriff elected by popular vote. Died in office on June 11, 1871.
16	Augustus B. R. Sprague		July 5, 1871 – January 1890		Appointed to fill the vacancy caused by the death of sheriff John S.C. Knowlton who died in office. Subsequently elected for six three year terms.
17	Samuel D. Nye		1890–1892	Democratic	
18	Robert H. Chamberlain		1892 – January 14, 1910	Republican	Resigned on January 14, 1910.
19	Benjamin D. Dwinnell		1910 – December 15, 1916	Republican	Died on December 15, 1916.
20	Albert F. Richardson		December 1916 – March 13, 1932	Republican	Died on March 13, 1932.
21	Henri Oscar Rocheleau		March 23, 1932 – January 1945	Democratic	Appointed to the office by Joseph B. Ely to fill the vacancy caused by the death of sheriff Albert F. Richardson.
22	William A. Bennett		January 1945 – January 1963	Republican	
23	Joseph A. Smith		January 1963 – 1977	Democratic	
24	Francis J."Bud" Deignan, Jr.		January 1977 – 1983	Democratic	
25	Theodore M. Herman		January 4, 1983 – 1987	Democratic	Appointed Worcester County Sheriff, to fill vacancy; on January 4, 1983, by Governor Edward J. King. Herman won the 1984 Democratic primary and the subsequent November 1984 election to fill the unexpired term.
26	John M. Flynn		1987–2005	Democratic	
27	Guy Glodis		2005 – January 5, 2011	Democratic	
28	Lewis Evangelidis		January 5, 2011 – present	Republican	
