= Vincent Gookin =

Vincent Gookin may refer to:

- Sir Vincent Gookin (writer) (c. 1594–1638), English-born landowner in Ireland and anti-Irish writer
- Vincent Gookin (surveyor-general) (1616?–1659), surveyor-general of Ireland and the son of the above-mentioned "Sir Vincent Gookin (writer)"
