= St John the Evangelist's Church, Courtmacsherry =

Anglican church in County Cork, Ireland

Coordinates: 51°38′00″N 8°42′18″W

St John the Evangelist's Church
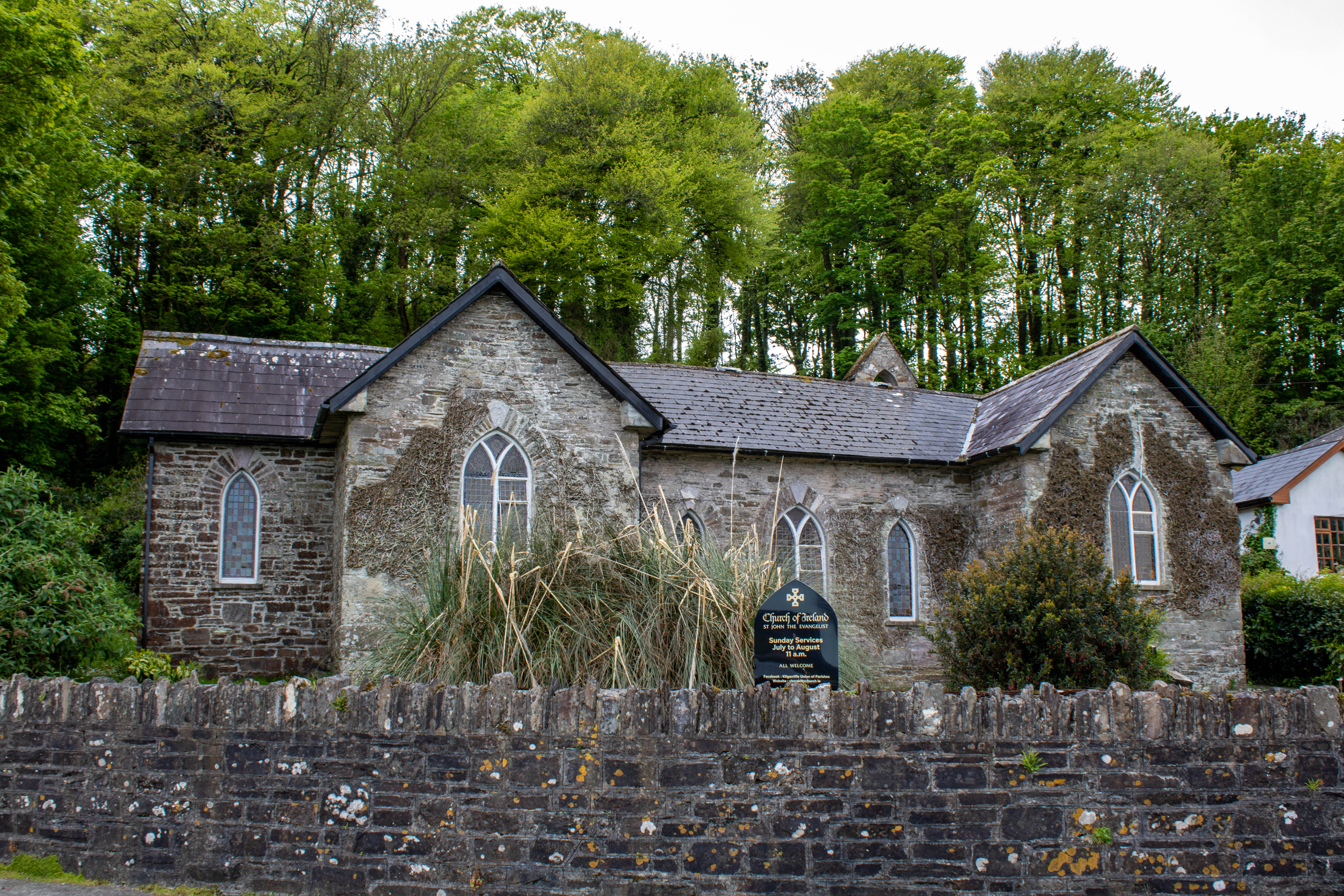
- Country: Ireland
- Denomination: Church of Ireland

Clergy
- Rector: Kingsley Sutton

St John the Evangelist's Church is a small Gothic Revival Anglican church located in Courtmacsherry, County Cork, Ireland. Originally used as a school building, it was built in 1830. It is dedicated to John the Evangelist. It is part of the Diocese of Cork, Cloyne, and Ross.

Revd Kingsley Sutton is the rector.

== History ==
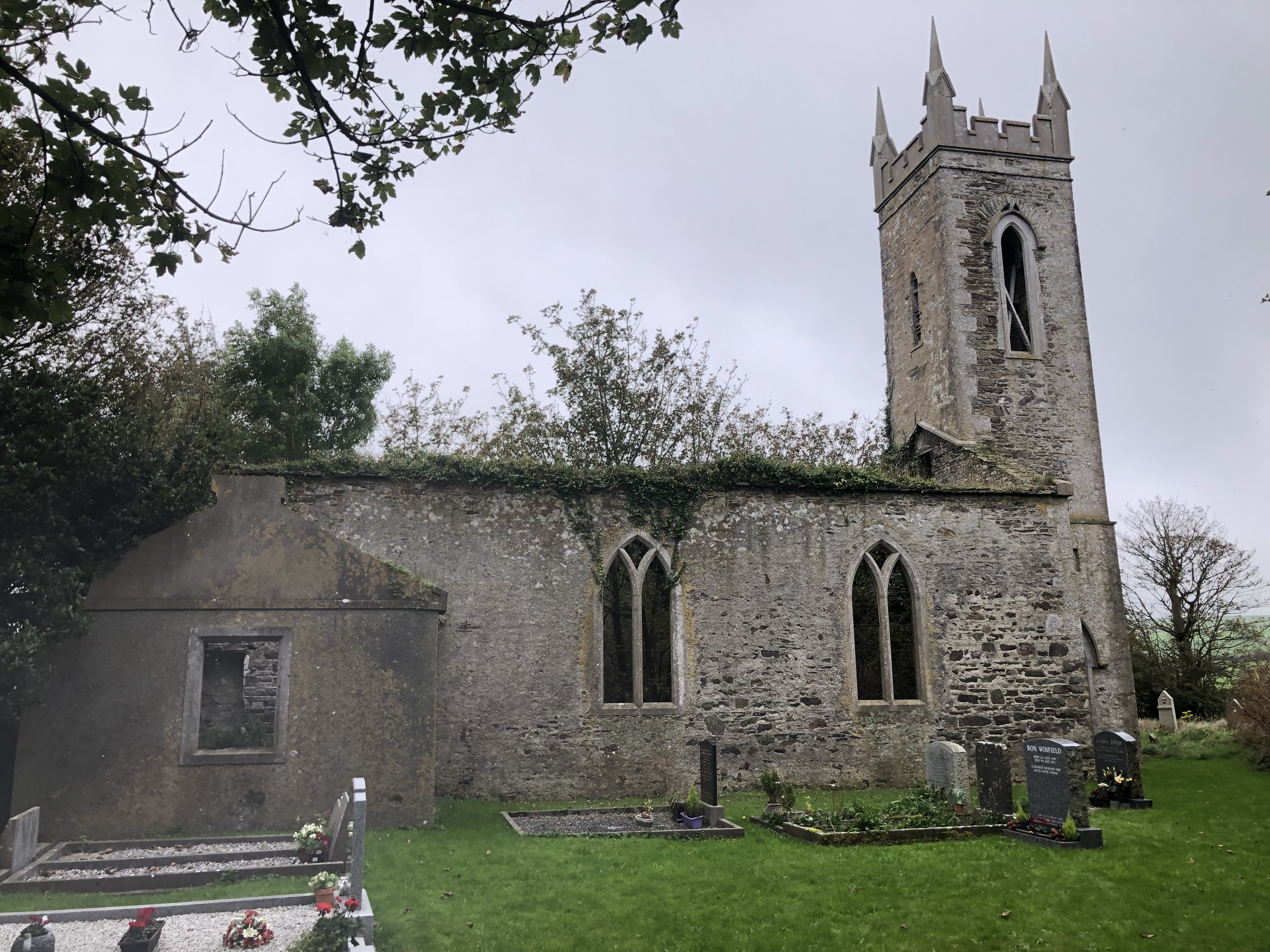
The deconsecrated church at Lislee

The building was completed in 1830. In 1894 it was repurposed as a church. It was opened for worship in 1907. When the neighbouring church in Lislee was deconsecrated in 1961, the church plate was transferred to St John the Evangelist's Church.

Services are only held in the church during July and August.

== Architecture ==
The church is H-plan, with five bays, and is one storey tall. It is built in the Gothic Revival style. The chancel features a stained glass window dedicated to Ernest Travers, designed by Watson & Co. It depicts Christ as the Good Shepherd.
