= Benjamin D. Dwinnell =

American military officer and politician (1834–1916)

Benjamin Dudley Dwinnell
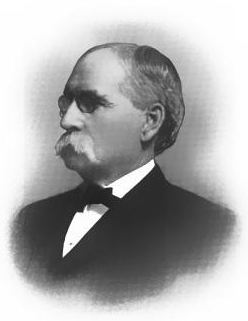

19th Sheriff of Worcester County, Massachusetts
- In office 1910 – December 15, 1916
- Preceded by: Robert H. Chamberlain
- Succeeded by: Albert F. Richardson

Member of the Fitchburg, Massachusetts Common Council

Personal details
- Born: September 14, 1834 Charlestown, New Hampshire, U.S.
- Died: December 15, 1916 (aged 82) Fitchburg, Massachusetts, U.S.
- Resting place: Hope Cemetery; Worcester, Massachusetts, U.S.
- Party: Republican
- Spouse: Nellie Shepard (m. 1861)
- Occupation: Law Enforcement Officer; Corrections Officer; Politician
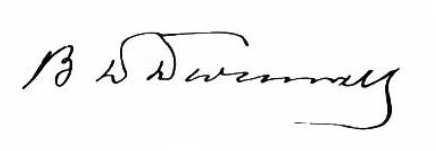
- Signature

Military service
- Allegiance: United States of America; Union
- Branch/service: Union Army
- Years of service: 1862-September 23, 1865
- Rank: Brevet Major
- Unit: 51st Regiment Massachusetts Volunteer Infantry 2nd Regiment Massachusetts Volunteer Heavy Artillery
- Battles/wars: American Civil War

Benjamin Dudley Dwinnell (September 14, 1834 - December 15, 1916) was an American law enforcement officer, military officer and politician who served as the nineteenth Sheriff of Worcester County, Massachusetts.

== Early life ==
Dwinnell was born in Charlestown, New Hampshire on September 14, 1834. Dwinnell was educated in the local public schools, after his education he worked for a year in the printing operations of the National Eagle in Claremont, New Hampshire after which Dwinnell moved to Worcester, Massachusetts where he worked in the grocery trade and in a hardware store.

== Family life ==
On December 19, 1861, Dwinnell married Nellie Shepard, Daughter of Russell Rice Shepard of Worcester, Massachusetts.

== Military service ==
In 1862 Dwinnell enlisted in the 51st Regiment Massachusetts Volunteer Infantry. Dwinell served as a First Lieutenant and Quartermaster of the 51st Regiment. In February 1864, after his enlistment in the 51st Regiment expired Dwinnell enlisted as a First Lieutenant and Quartermaster of the 2nd Regiment Massachusetts Volunteer Heavy Artillery, serving with Augustus B. R. Sprague. Dwinnell saw service with the 2nd Regiment in Virginia and North Carolina. Having reached the rank of Brevet Major; Dwinnell was mustered out on September 23, 1865.

== Post war service ==
After the American Civil War, Dwinnell returned to Worcester where he became the assistant Post Master under General Josiah Pickett. In 1875 Dwinnell was appointed, by his former commanding officer Sheriff Augustus B. R. Sprague, as a Deputy Sheriff, and the Jailer and Master of the House of Correction at Fitchburg, Massachusetts.

== Personal life ==
Dwinnell died at his home on the jail grounds in Fitchburg on December 15, 1916. He was buried in Hope Cemetery in Worcester.

== Notes ==
Political offices
| Preceded by Robert H. Chamberlain | 19th Sheriff of Worcester County, Massachusetts; 1910 – December 15, 1916 | Succeeded by Albert F. Richardson |
