= James Milton True =

American Union Army officer (1823–1908)

- Born: October 14, 1828; Scott County, Kentucky, US
- Died: July 28, 1908; Mattoon, Illinois, US
- Burial place: Dodge Grove Cemetery in Mattoon, Illinois
- Military career
- Allegiance: United States (Union)
- Branch: United States Army (Union Army)
- Rank: Bvt. Brigadier General
- Unit: 62nd Illinois Infantry Regiment
- Conflicts: American Civil War
- Awards: Brevet promotion Brigadier General
- Other work: United States Consul

James Milton True (October 14, 1823 – July 28, 1908) was a Union Army officer during the American Civil War. He was a colonel who led the 62nd Illinois Infantry during the American Civil War. For a period of time, he commanded a brigade during the war. He was later named a brevet brigadier general with a promotion date of March 6, 1865. After the war, he served as a minister and as United States Consul in Kingston, Ontario, between 1874 and 1878.

He previously worked in the railroad business and was a merchant in Mattoon, Illinois, where he was the city's first postmaster. The village of Humboldt, Illinois, was originally named Milton or Milton Station was named after him as he had a store there and was known in the county as Milton True.

His brother Lewis Corbin True led a brigade at the end of the Civil War, and on July 11, 1865, was promoted to colonel and given command of the District of South Kansas. His brother Edmund W. True was a captain who was killed at the Battle of Fort Donelson, and Edmund True's son Theodore E. True also served during the war and eventually rose to the rank of brigadier general.

== See also ==
- List of American Civil War brevet generals (Union)
