= Daniel Gookin (sheriff) =

1st Sheriff of Worcester County, Massachusetts
- In office June 30, 1731 – June 1743

Personal details
- Died: June 1743
- Occupation: Law Enforcement Officer

Daniel Gookin was the first sheriff of Worcester County, Massachusetts.

He was born about 1687/8, at Cambridge, Massachusetts, the son of Samuel Gookins and his wife née Mary Larkin, and the grandson of Major-General Daniel Gookin.

Gookin was appointed the first sheriff of Worcester County, Massachusetts on June 30, 1741.

== Death ==
Gookin died in June 1743.

== Notes ==
Political offices
Preceded by None	1st Sheriff of Worcester County, Massachusetts; 1731-June 1743	Succeeded by Benjamin Flagg
