= Vincent Gookin (surveyor-general) =

English surveyor-general

Vincent Gookin (1616?–1659) was an English surveyor-general of Ireland. He represented Irish constituencies in the Protectorate parliaments. In 1655 he published two pamphlets deprecating the enforcement of orders for transplantation of Irish to Connaught. He was a man of strong religious convictions, and an ardent republican.

== Biography ==
Gookin was the eldest son of Sir Vincent Gookin (c. 1594–1638) and his first wife Mary Wood. Some years after the death of his father, in 1648, he appears to have disposed of his Gloucestershire property to a Dr. Samuel Bave, and to have migrated to Ireland, where he continued to reside during the remainder of his life. Although a firm believer in the "plantation policy" as a means of reducing Ireland to "civility and good government", he was one of the few colonists who really seem to have had the interest of Ireland at heart. He is chiefly known to us as the author of the remarkable pamphlet, The Great Case of Transplantation discussed; or certain Considerations, wherein the many great inconveniences in Transplanting the Natives of Ireland generally out of the three Provinces of Leinster, Ulster, and Munster into the Province of Connaught are shown, humbly tendered to every individual Member of Parliament by a Well-wisher to the good of the Commonwealth of England, 4to, London, for J. C., 1655.

In this pamphlet, Gookin endeavoured to prove that if not indeed impossible, it was certainly contrary to "religion, profit, and safety", to strictly enforce the orders and instructions for the removal of all the Irish natives into Connaught, based upon the act for the satisfaction of the adventurers of 26 September 1653.

At the end of the nineteenth century, the pamphlet was thought to be very rare. Dunlop wrote that it was not mentioned by Ware in his Writers of Ireland. He mentions a copy (perhaps unique) in the Haliday collection in the Royal Irish Academy. John Patrick Prendergast, who first called attention to it, gave a fairly complete abstract of it in his Cromwellian Settlement. Though exceedingly temperate in its tone, it immediately elicited a sharp rejoinder from Colonel Richard Lawrence, a prominent member of the committee of transplantation. Gookin replied in The Author and Case of Transplanting the Irish into Connaught vindicated from the unjust aspersions of Col. R. Lawrence, London, 1655. He had been charged with being a degenerate Englishman, and with having been corrupted by the Irish. He denied the charge, saying that he was elected by the English of Kinsale and Bandon to the Barebones Parliament, and his constituents had shown their regard for him by offering to pay his expenses to England.

The controversy forms an episode in the great struggle, culminating in the appointment of Henry Cromwell as chief governor of Ireland in September 1655, for the substitution of a settled civil government in place of the rule of a clique of officers. For Henry Cromwell, even perhaps more than for Oliver Cromwell, Gookin felt a profound admiration, and seems to have been the author of the Ancient Protestants' Petition in defence of the former against the attacks of the military clique. There is an interesting account of the presentation of this petition to Cromwell, in a letter by Gookin to Henry Cromwell, in Lansdowne MS. No. 822, f. 26–7, dated 21 October 1656. The gist of the petition, which, for prudential reasons, was not published, may be gathered from a subsequent letter by Gookin to the Protector on 22 Nov. 1656.

Gookin's views on this and other topics of historical importance are interesting and intelligent. Speaking in 1657 of the Decimating Bill at that time before parliament, he says: "In my opinion those that speak against the bill have much to say in point of moral justice and prudence; but that which makes me fear the passing of the bill is that thereby his highness' government will be more founded in force and more removed from that natural foundation which the people in parliament are desirous to give him".

On 7 July 1656 Gookin was appointed, along with Sir William Petty and Miles Symner, to the Down Survey, with the aim of apportioning to the soldiers the lands allotted to them in payment of their arrears. It appears from a letter to Henry Cromwell on 14 April 1657, petitioning for an abatement of rent on lands granted him in 1650 "for favour", that he did not turn any of his offices to his own personal advantage. He represented Kinsale and Bandon under the Commonwealth, except in 1659, when, for party purposes, he surrendered his seat to Sir William Petty, and successfully contested Cork and Youghal against Lord Broghill. He died the same year intestate.

== Family ==
Gookin married Mary Salmon of Dublin, by whom he had two sons and a daughter. His younger brother, Robert Gookin (died 1667), of Courtmacsherry, served as a captain in the English Parliamentary army in Ireland, and received grants of land in Ireland.
