= 62 =

62 may refer to:

- 62 (number), the natural number following 61 and preceding 63
- one of the years 62 BC, AD 62, 1962, 2062
- The international calling code for Indonesia
- Maybach 62, an ultra-luxury car
- M62 motorway in the UK
- "Sixty Two", a song by Karma to Burn from the album Mountain Czar, 2016
- 62 Erato, a main-belt asteroid
- Six-Two (also known as "Six2"), a rapper appearing on Dr. Dre's 1999 album 2001

== See also ==
- 62nd (disambiguation)
