= H. Oscar Rocheleau =

21st Sheriff of Worcester County, Massachusetts
- In office March 23, 1932 – January 1945
- Appointed by: Joseph B. Ely
- Preceded by: Albert F. Richardson
- Succeeded by: William A. Bennett

Personal details
- Born: Henri Oscar Rocheleau; November 2, 1876 Worcester, Massachusetts
- Died: September 25, 1956 (aged 79) United States of America
- Party: Democratic
- Occupation: Law Enforcement Officer; Corrections Officer; Politician

Henri Oscar Rocheleau (1876-1956) was an American law enforcement officer and politician who served as twenty first Sheriff of Worcester County, Massachusetts.

Political offices
Preceded by Albert F. Richardson	21st Sheriff of Worcester County, Massachusetts; March 23, 1932-January 1945	Succeeded by William A. Bennett
