= Patrick Keohane =

Irish born Antarctic explorer (1878–1950)

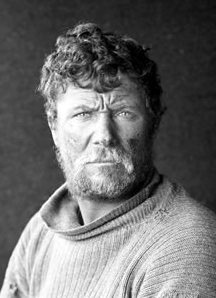
- Keohane c. 1912
- Born: Patrick Keohane; 2 June 1879; Courtmacsherry, County Cork, Ireland
- Died: 31 August 1950 (aged 71); Plymouth, England
- Other names: Patsy
- Spouse: Bridget Mary O'Driscoll

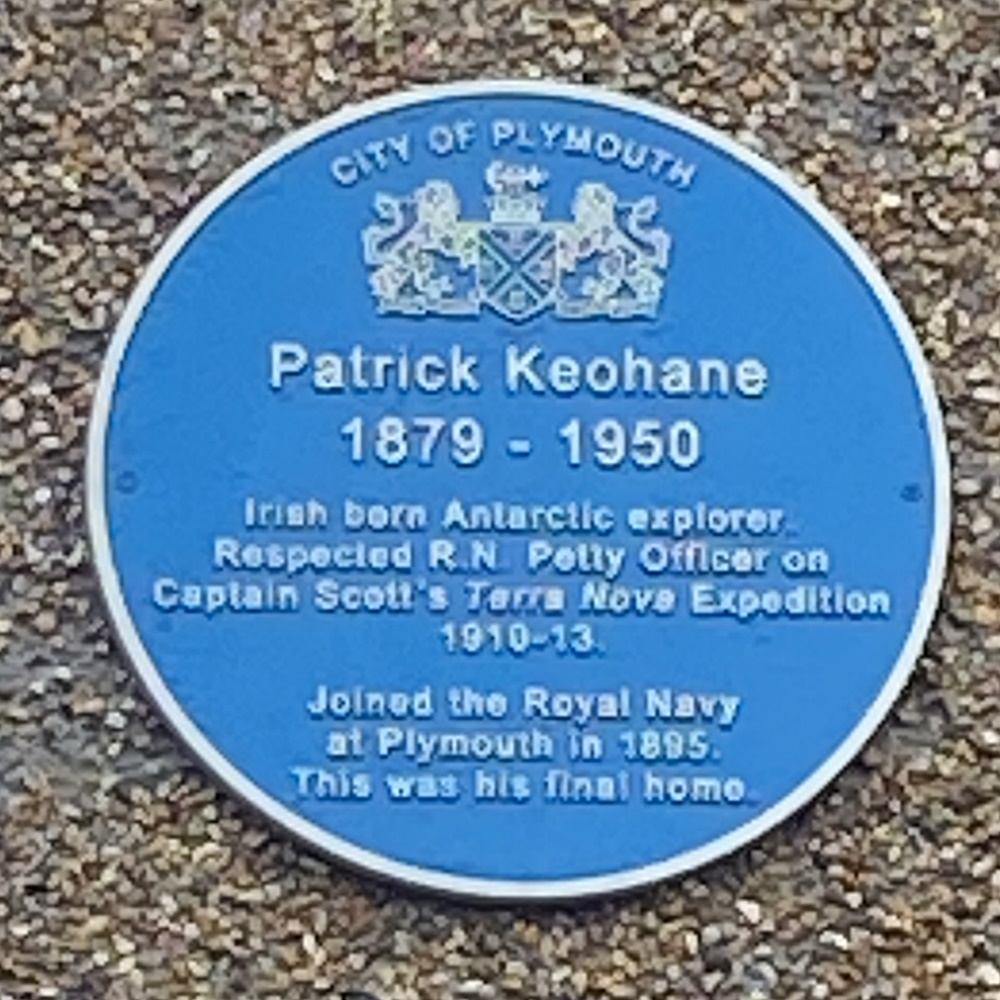
Blue Plaque Patrick Keohane

Patrick Keohane (2 June 1879 – 31 August 1950) was an Irish member of Robert Falcon Scott's Antarctic expedition of 1910–1913, the Terra Nova expedition.

== Biography ==
Patrick Keohane was born in Courtmacsherry, County Cork, Ireland, in 1879. He joined the Royal Navy and rose to the rank of petty officer. Served with Teddy Evans on HMS Talbot.

Sledge flag used by Keohane in Antarctica during the Terra Nova Expedition

At age 30, he was selected by Teddy Evans to join the Terra Nova expedition to Antarctica. He joined the Terra Nova from HMS Repulse. On the expedition's main southern journey, he led a pony to the foot of the Beardmore glacier, and then became part of the 12-man manhauling party which began the push towards the pole. He was a member of the first supporting group, along with Edward L. Atkinson, Charles S. Wright and Apsley Cherry-Garrard, to be sent back at 85° 15’ South on 22 December 1911. On their journey back to Cape Evans, Keohane fell down crevasses to the full length of his harness eight times in 25 minutes. According to Cherry-Garrard, Keohane "looked a bit dazed" after that ordeal. They successfully reached Hut Point on 26 January 1912.

On 27 March 1912, Keohane, along with Atkinson, attempted to find Scott and his polar party and bring them back to Cape Evans from the One Ton supply depot. Starting at Hut Point, the party only made it to a point eight miles (13 km) south of Corner Camp. There they left a week's provisions and returned to Cape Evans on 1 April. On 29 October, after spending the winter on the continent, Keohane was among a party that went to search for Scott's group. On 12 November, they found the frozen bodies of Scott, Edward Adrian Wilson, and Henry Robertson Bowers eleven miles south of the One Ton supply depot.

The party sailed on the Terra Nova from Cape Evans for the last time on 22 January 1913. The ship arrived in Wales on 14 June. After his return, Keohane joined the Coast Guard service. He served as the district officer of coastguards for the Isle of Man. He later rejoined the Royal Navy and served in World War II.

Keohane died in Plymouth in 1950, at the age of 71.

== Legacy ==
Keohane was portrayed by Larry Burns in the 1948 film Scott of the Antarctic, and by Tom Gerrard in the 1985 television serial The Last Place on Earth.

A statue of Keohane was erected at Courtmacsherry, showing him looking across the water at the place of his birth.

To mark the centenary of Keohane's birth, a Courtmacsherry committee commissioned local song-writer, Michael O'Brien to write a song about his life. Entitled " Pat Keohane", it was issued on a CD of O'Brien's songs entitled Songs To Cheer You, Humorous & Otherwise.
