= Joseph A. Smith (sheriff) =

American politician and law enforcement officer

23rd Sheriff of Worcester County, Massachusetts
- In office January 1963 – September 1, 1977
- Preceded by: William A. Bennett

Personal details
- Born: September 23, 1911
- Died: May 25, 2003 Worcester, Massachusetts
- Resting place: Worcester County Memorial Park, Paxton, Massachusetts
- Spouse: Lorena R. Crowley
- Children: Joseph A. McKenna-Smith; J. Michael Smith; Bernard P. Smith; Bernadette (Smith) Baniukiewicz; William F. Smith; Brenda M. Smith-Burke; Francis X. Smith.
- Education: College of the Holy Cross; University of Notre Dame; Boston University
- Occupation: Corrections Officer; Politician

Joseph A. Smith (September 23, 1911 – May 25, 2003) was an American politician and law enforcement officer who served as Sheriff of Worcester County, Massachusetts, from 1962 to 1977.

Smith was the son of Dr. Joseph A. and Mary (Dunn) Smith.

From 1941 to 1962 Smith was an F.B.I. special agent. Smith worked as an instructor teaching such things as firearms and federal criminal law.

Smith resigned his position as sheriff on September 1, 1977, while under investigation by the Massachusetts Attorney General.
