= William A. Bennett =

American politician (1849–1922)

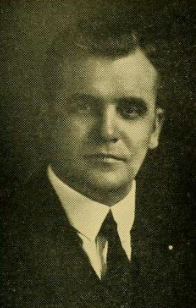
- Bennett in 1927

Sheriff of Worcester County, Massachusetts
- In office 1945–1963
- Preceded by: H. Oscar Rocheleau
- Succeeded by: Joseph A. Smith

Mayor of Worcester, Massachusetts
- In office 1938–1945
- Preceded by: John S. Sullivan
- Succeeded by: John H. Toomey Jr. (acting)
- In office 1936; Acting
- Preceded by: Walter J. Cookson
- Succeeded by: John S. Sullivan

Member of the Massachusetts House of Representatives
- In office 1925–1928
- Preceded by: Herbert F. Winn
- Succeeded by: Arthur T. Squires
- Constituency: 19th Worcester district (1925–1926); 18th Worcester district (1927–1928)

Personal details
- Born: March 7, 1887 Worcester, Massachusetts, U.S.
- Died: September 15, 1970 (aged 83) Worcester, Massachusetts, U.S.
- Resting place: Hope Cemetery
- Party: Republican
- Spouse: Nellie Bacon
- Children: 2

William A. Bennett (March 7, 1887 – September 15, 1970) was an American politician who was mayor of Worcester, Massachusetts from 1939 to 1945 and sheriff of Worcester County, Massachusetts from 1945 to 1963.

== Early life ==
Bennett was born in Worcester, Massachusetts on March 7, 1887. He was educated in the Worcester Public Schools. Outside of politics, Bennett was an employment manager and was manager of the Wickwire-Spencer Steel Company's Goddard Works.

== Politics ==
Bennett was a member of the Worcester common council from 1921 to 1924 and was council president in 1923 and 1924. From 1925 to 1928, he was a member of the Massachusetts House of Representatives. In 1935, he was elected to represent Ward 7 of the Board of Aldermen. He was president of the board in 1936 and became acting mayor following the death of Walter J. Cookson. He served for four months until John S. Sullivan won the special election to finish Cookson's term.

Bennett was the Republican nominee for mayor in 1937. Sullivan was declared the winner by 25 votes, but Bennett asked for a recount, with both sides alleging ballot tampering. The recount found that Bennett had won by 96 votes. The Democrats challenged the results in the Massachusetts Supreme Judicial Court, which appointed Richard J. Lane to investigate the protested ballots. Sullivan obtained an injunction to remain in office until the election was decided. In March 1938, Lane issued a report that confirmed Bennett's victory by 80 or 92 votes, depending on the outcome of Sullivan's legal case over 12 disputed ballots. Justice Stanley Elroy Qua lifted the injunction on March 18, 1938 and the board of aldermen certified Bennett's victory. He was sworn in that day, but Sullivan refused to leave office, contending that he was the rightful mayor until his case was heard by the full bench of the Massachusetts Supreme Judicial Court. He agreed to turn over the office to Bennett the following day, but maintained that he had won the election. Sullivan's case was dismissed by the Supreme Judicial Court in August.

Bennett and Sullivan faced off in a rematch in 1939, which Bennett won decisively – 37,747 votes to 30,887. He was reelected by a wide margin in the next two elections, defeating John M. Shea in 1941 and Charles F. Jeff Sullivan in 1943.

In 1944, Bennett was a candidate for sheriff of Worcester County. He easily won the Republican primary and defeated Democratic incumbent H. Oscar Rocheleau 109,626 votes to 105,782. He served as mayor and sheriff concurrently until September 1945, when he stepped down as mayor. Bennett served as sheriff for sixteen years. He was defeated for reelection in 1962 by retired FBI agent Joseph A. Smith.

== Personal life ==
Bennett married Nellie Bacon. They had a son and daughter, Gordon F. and Phyllis. In March 1962, his left leg was amputated following periodic hospitalization.

Bennett died on September 15, 1970, at Wayside Nursing Home in Worcester. He was buried in Hope Cemetery in Worcester.
