= Vincent Gookin (writer) =

English landowner

Sir Vincent Gookin (c. 1594 – 5 February 1638) was an English-born landowner in Ireland. He was an anti-Irish writer who created a disturbance in Munster by publishing a letter to Lord Deputy Wentworth attacking the Irish nation in 1634. He fled to England when a warrant for his arrest was issued. His case raised the question of the judicial powers of the Irish Parliament.

== Biography ==
Gookin was the youngest son of John Gookin, esq., of Ripple Court near Deal in Kent, and Catherine, daughter of William Dene (or Denne), esq., of Bursted in the same county, and the brother of Daniel Gookin (d.1632) and thus uncle of Daniel Gookin (d.1687) who later settled in Massachusetts. He was born, probably in 1584, but perhaps as late as 1590. Little is known of his early years: he spent some time on the Continent, probably involved in the pilchard industry.

He settled in Ireland about 1606 as a tenant in fee-simple, under Henry Beecher (and subsequently under the 1st Earl of Cork, who purchased Beecher's grant), of the manor of Castle Mahon in the barony of Kinalmeaky, County Cork, part of the seignory granted by letters patent (30 September 1588) to Phane Beecher and Hugh Worth as 'under-takers' for the plantation of Munster.

Sir Vincent (who was knighted in 1631 by Lord Cork and the 1st Viscount Loftus, Lord High Chancellor of Ireland, for his service as High Sheriff of County Cork) was a man of considerable enterprise, and was soon regarded as one of the wealthiest men in the south of Ireland, possessing property in both England and Ireland, and deriving a large income from his fisheries at Courtmacsherry, and from his wool flocks. In spite of his position he bitterly hated Irishmen, and in 1634 he created considerable disturbance in Munster by publishing and circulating, under the form of a letter addressed to Lord Wentworth, the Lord Deputy of Ireland, what was described by the Lord Deputy, as a most bitter invective against the whole nation, natives, old English, new English, Papist, Protestant, Captains, Soldiers, and all, which … did so incense, I may say enrage, all sorts of people against him, as it was evident they would have hanged him if they could. The matter was taken up by parliament, and so "wondrous foul and scandalous" was the libel, that Wentworth clearly perceived that, unless prompt measures were taken by the crown to punish the offender, the question of the judicature of parliament —"wherein", he added naively, "I disbelieve His Majesty was not so fully resolved in the convenience and fitness thereof by any effect it hath produced, since it was restored to the Houses of Parliament in England"—would be raised in a most obnoxious fashion.

A pursuivant with a warrant for his arrest was immediately despatched into Munster, but two days before his arrival Gookin had fled with his wife into England. The constitutional question of the judicature thus raised still remained. Wentworth boldly asserted that in questions of judicature, as in matters of legislature, nothing, according to Poynings' Law, could be determined by the Parliament of Ireland that had not first been transmitted as good and expedient by the Lord Deputy of Ireland and Privy Council of Ireland. He nevertheless recognised the necessity of appeasing their wrath by inflicting a severe punishment on Gookin. The offence, he declared, would bear a "deep fine", and Gookin, being "a very rich man", was well able to pay it. Order was accordingly given by the king and council "to find out and transmit this audacious knight" to be censured in the council chamber. What his punishment was or whether he managed to evade it does not appear; but it is probable that he never again revisited Ireland. He died at his residence at Highfield in Gloucestershire on 5 February 1638, and was buried in the parish church of Bitton. The bulk of his property in England and Ireland passed to his eldest son, Vincent.

== Family ==
Gookin married, first, Mary, daughter of Mr. Wood of Waldron, by whom he had two sons, Vincent and Robert (besides other children who died young). His second wife was Judith, daughter of Sir Thomas Crooke of Baltimore, County Cork, and Mary Jackson, with whom he had two sons, Thomas and Charles, and five daughters, and several other children who died young.
