= Albert F. Richardson =

American law enforcement officer and politician (1868–1932)

Albert Frederick Richardson
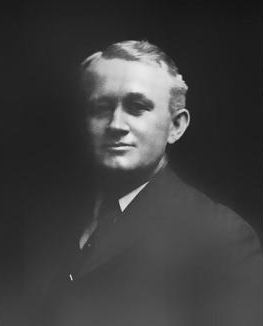

20th Sheriff of Worcester County, Massachusetts
- In office January, 1916 – March 13, 1932
- Preceded by: Benjamin D. Dwinnell
- Succeeded by: H. Oscar Rocheleau

Personal details
- Born: March 28, 1868 Hardwick, Massachusetts
- Died: March 13, 1932 Worcester, Massachusetts
- Party: Republican
- Spouse: Grace M. E. Allison
- Occupation: Law Enforcement Officer; Corrections Officer; Politician

Albert Frederick Richardson (March 28, 1868 – March 13, 1932) was an American law enforcement officer and politician who served as twentieth Sheriff of Worcester County, Massachusetts.

== Early life ==
Richardson was born in Hardwick, Massachusetts on March 28, 1868, to Alonzo Frederick and Martha (Marsh) Richardson.

== Death ==
Richardson died at the Worcester County Jail on March 13, 1932.

Political offices
Preceded by Benjamin D. Dwinnell	20th Sheriff of Worcester County, Massachusetts; January, 1916 - March 13, 1932	Succeeded by H. Oscar Rocheleau
