= Edith Coghlan =

Irish poet (1866–1931)

- Born: 31 March 1866 Lislee House, Courtmacsherry, County Cork, Ireland
- Died: 1931 (aged 64–65) County Cork, Ireland
- Occupation: Poet
- Language: English; French
- Spouse: Thomas Sherrard (m. 1905)
- Children: 1

Edith Helena Coghlan (married name Sherrard; 31 March 1866 – 1931) was an Irish poet active in County Cork and France.

== Biography ==
Coghlan was born on 31 March 1866 at Lislee House in Courtmacsherry (Note: Also cited as the nearby village of Timoleague.) to Heber Coghlan, a schoolmaster and poet, and Mary Jane Coghlan (née Soane; died 1870). Coughlan had at least two younger siblings.

A regular contributor of poetry to weekly newspapers in Dublin and Cork, Coghlan also published poetry in the New York Weekly between 1894 and 1897. From 1894, Coghlan lived for a period in France where she wrote poetry in English and French. In 1887, Coghlan published in Ireland a book of poetry entitled "Rejoice". In 1901, Coghlan was working as a lady's maid in Surrey and had later returned to County Cork by 1911.

On 2 March 1905, Coghlan married Thomas Sherrard, a farmer from County Cork, at St Leonard's Church in Chelsham. The couple had one son, and Coghlan was the stepmother of two children from Sherrad's first marriage. Coghlan died in 1931 in County Cork.

== Bibliography ==
- Coghlan, Edith H. (1887). Rejoice.
