= James Estabrook =

American politician

Worcester County, Massachusetts sheriff
- In office 1851–1853
- Appointed by: George S. Boutwell
- Preceded by: John W. Lincoln
- Succeeded by: George W. Richardson

Member of the Board of Aldermen for the City of Worcester, Massachusetts
- In office 1848–1849

Personal details
- Born: September 4, 1796 Holden, Massachusetts
- Died: May 16, 1874 (aged 77) Worcester, Massachusetts
- Party: Democratic
- Spouse: Almira Read

James Estabrook (September 4, 1796 – May 16, 1874) was a Worcester, Massachusetts grocer who served as the sheriff of Worcester County, Massachusetts from 1851 to 1853.

== Early life ==
Estabrook was born to James and Betsey (Lovell) Estabrook in Holden, Massachusetts, on September 4, 1796.

Political offices
| Preceded by John W. Lincoln | 13th Sheriff of Worcester County, Massachusetts; 1851–1853 | Succeeded by George W. Richardson |
