= 62nd Massachusetts Infantry Regiment =

62nd Massachusetts Volunteer Infantry
- Active: March 1865 to 5 May 1865
- Country: United States of America
- Allegiance: Union
- Branch: United States Army
- Type: Infantry
- Size: 405

Commanders
- Colonel: Ansel D Wass

The 62nd Massachusetts Volunteer Infantry Regiment was an infantry regiment being raised to serve in the Union Army during the American Civil War. The war ended before the unit was complete.

== History ==
Returning from his command of the 60th Massachusetts Infantry, Colonel Ansel D Wass began to raise another infantry regiment at Readville, Massachusetts for one year's service. With the last companies of the 61st Massachusetts Infantry leaving camp in early March 1865, new recruits began forming another regiment. Between March and 11 April 1865, four companies had been mustered in when General Lee's surrender stopped the organization. The volunteers remained in camp until 5 May, when they were mustered out of service.

== Casualties ==
From a complement of 405 men, two died from disease, while eight others deserted.

== See also ==
- List of Massachusetts Civil War Units
- Massachusetts in the American Civil War
