= 62nd Regiment =

62nd Regiment or 62nd Infantry Regiment may refer to:

- 62nd (Shawinigan) Field Regiment, Royal Canadian Artillery, a unit of the Canadian Army
- 62nd Field Artillery Regiment, RCA, a unit of the Canadian Army
- 62nd Reserve Artillery Regiment (Ireland), a unit of the Irish Reserve Defence Force
- 62nd Regiment of Foot (disambiguation), three units of the British Army have had this name
- 62nd Infantry Regiment (United States), a unit of the US Army
- 62nd Air Defense Artillery Regiment, a unit of the US Army

American Civil War

Union (Northern) Army

- 62nd Illinois Volunteer Infantry Regiment
- 62nd New York Volunteer Infantry Regiment
- 62nd Indiana Infantry Regiment
- 62nd Ohio Infantry
- 62nd Pennsylvania Infantry
- 62nd Regiment Massachusetts Volunteer Infantry

Confederate (Southern) Army

- 62nd Virginia Mounted Infantry
- 62nd Tennessee Infantry
