= 62nd Illinois Infantry Regiment =

62nd Regiment Illinois Volunteer Infantry
- Illinois state flag
- Active: April 10, 1862, to March 6, 1866
- Country: United States
- Allegiance: Union
- Branch: Infantry

The 62nd Regiment Illinois Volunteer Infantry was an infantry regiment that served in the Union Army during the American Civil War.

== Service ==
The 62nd Illinois Infantry was originally organized at Anna, Illinois, and mustered into Federal service on April 10, 1862.

The regiment was mustered out on March 6, 1866.

== Total strength and casualties ==
The regiment suffered 3 enlisted men who were killed in action or mortally wounded and 9 officers and 251 enlisted men who died of disease, for a total of 263 fatalities.

== Commanders ==
- Colonel James Milton True

== See also ==
- List of Illinois Civil War Units
- Illinois in the American Civil War
