= Robert Gookin =

Robert Gookin of Courtmacsherry (died 1666/7), was an Anglo-Irishman who served as a captain in the English Parliamentary army in Ireland, and received grants of land in Ireland.

== Biography ==
Gookin was the younger son of Sir Vincent Gookin and his first wife Mary Wood.

Gookin served in Ireland during the Irish Confederate Wars for the Royalist cause, and the Cromwellian conquest of Ireland for the English Parliament, taking a prominent part in the defection of the Munster forces in 1648, and being actively engaged in the surrender of Bandon in the following year. In 1652, in pursuance of an agreement with the commissioners of the parliament, he fortified the abbey of Rosscarbery, County Cork, for which he afterwards claimed and received compensation. Under the Commonwealth he received considerable grants of forfeited land, which, in order to secure at the approach of the Restoration of Charles II, he conveyed to the 1st Earl of Orrery, taking a lease of them for one hundred years. He died in late 1666 or early 1667

== Family ==
Gookin married Dorothy, who subsequently married Randal Clayton, son of Sir Randal Clayton of Thelwall, Cheshire. Gookin and Dorothy had two sons Vincent and Robert and two daughters Anne and Mary. His elder brother Vincent Gookin (1616?-1659), was surveyor-general of Ireland during the Interregnum.
