= 60 Seconds! =

2015 survival video game

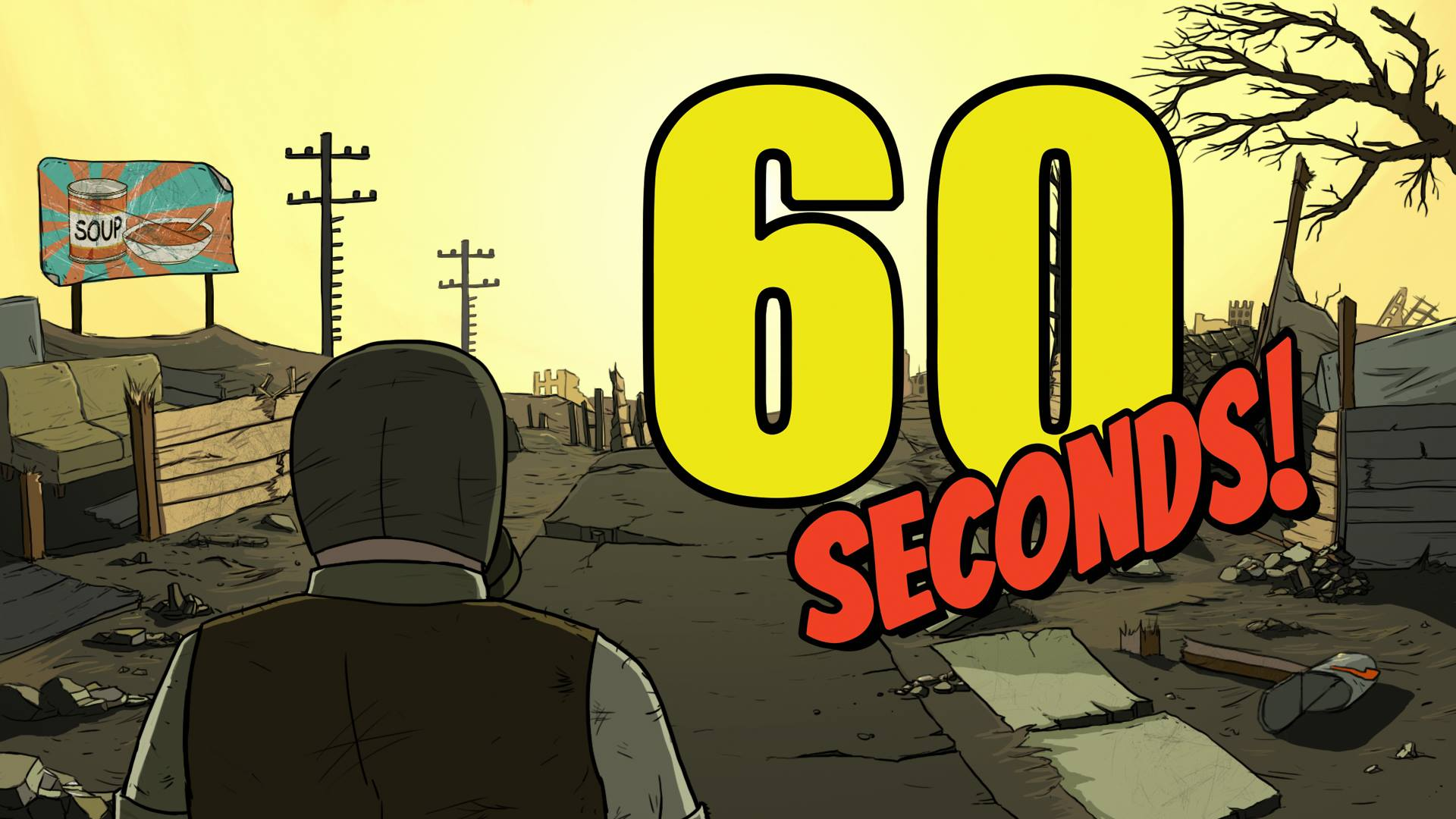
- Developer: Robot Gentleman
- Publisher: Robot Gentleman
- Composer: Michał Ratkowski
- Engine: Unity
- Platforms: Windows, Nintendo Switch, PlayStation 4, Xbox One, macOS, Android, iOS
- Release: Windows; May 25, 2015; iOS; September 22, 2016; Nintendo Switch; December 18, 2017; Android; December 28, 2017; PlayStation 4, Xbox One; March 6, 2020
- Genre: Survival
- Mode: Single-player

60 Seconds! is a 2015 survival game developed and published by Polish studio Robot Gentleman. The game takes place in a suburban town as a nuclear bomb is set to detonate in 60 seconds, forcing a family of four to gather as many supplies as possible within the timeframe before escaping into an underground bunker, where they must use whatever was gathered to survive as long as possible.

It was initially released for Windows, and later for iOS, Nintendo Switch, Android, Xbox One and PlayStation 4.

A sequel titled 60 Parsecs! was released in 2018. A revamped version of 60 Seconds! titled 60 Seconds! Reatomized was released in 2019.

== Plot ==
60 Seconds! takes place in a suburban area of the United States during the 1950s.

The game follows the McDoodle family (Ted, Dolores, Mary Jane, and Timmy) as they try to survive the effects of a nuclear apocalypse for as long as possible.

There are two good endings and about twelve bad endings (where the family dies or loses their shelter).

== Gameplay ==
The game is basically split into two distinct sections: foraging and survival.

During the first section, the player controls Ted. They have 60 seconds to look around the house, gathering family members and supplies, before a nuclear bomb is dropped. The layout of the house, as well as the locations of the items, changes in each playthrough. Those who have managed to enter the shelter in time will move on to the next section, alongside the items brought.

Each day, the player must make decisions for the family based on supplies available, limited information, and the abilities of the saved family members. Some of these entail risks, and may result in poor health or even the death of one or all of the family members.

The player must ration consumable supplies, such as food and water, among the family members. They are rationed based on how many consumables were initially acquired, the family members' overall health, and their need for particular rations. The player must also be cautious about the mental state of the family members, as it may deteriorate due to isolation and affect the gameplay.

At times, a character may be required to leave the shelter to scavenge for supplies and food. Again, this entails risk, as they may fall ill due to radiation, or may face an event resulting in their death.

Other times, a knock may be heard at the hatch of the underground shelter, and the player must make a decision on whether to ignore it, or open the hatch to allow whoever or whatever is there to interact with the characters. Depending on the event, this could result in a possible trade between the McDoodles and other affected families, or a shelter raid where supplies are stolen. This is just one of many types of events that can happen in-game, and generally, one will happen every day.

If the player makes certain decisions, groups including the U.S. Army or a larger group of friendly survivors may come to rescue the family, successfully ending the game.

== Development and release ==
60 Seconds! was developed by the Polish company Robot Gentleman from August 2013 to May 2015. It was inspired by the fear of nuclear apocalypse during the Cold War era. As such, both the story and the art style were based on the 1950s, when the game takes place. The writing was done by Berenika Gotojuch, also a designer, and Dominik Gotojuch, also a programmer and designer.

The game was originally supposed to be just an internal prototype, meant to verify if Unity was well-suited for the team. When they realized the potential of the idea, making it a complete game became a priority. Initially 60 Seconds!'s gameplay included only the scavenging portion, with the final outcome being automatically generated based on the player's choices. However, the team decided to expand on the survival portion and make it playable.

60 Seconds! was initially released on May 25, 2015, for Windows. It received an iOS version on September 22, 2016. The game was later released for Nintendo Switch on December 18, 2017. An Android port was published on December 28, 2017.

It became available on March 6, 2020, for PlayStation 4 and Xbox One.

== Reception ==
Reception

Aggregate score
Aggregator	Score
Metacritic	(Xbox One) 63/100

Review scores
Publication	Score
Nintendo Life	(Switch) 4/10
Pocket Gamer	(iOS) 4/5

Nintendo Life's Mitch Vogel described the game as "the product of good ideas marred by poor execution". He criticized the controls during the foraging section, a time-sensitive moment of an already challenging game. Additionally, Vogel admonished the survival section for its randomness and lack of player agency, claiming that "you lose even after doing everything right". He also expressed mixed feelings about the art style. On the positive side, the reviewer pointed out the game's replayability, with several different modes, as well as the in-game achievements.

Pocket Gamer's Matt Suckley, on the other hand, argued that the clumsy movement worked in "making everything feel that bit more panicked and human". Suckley highlighted the weight of the choices and praised how the artwork allows the player to keep track of the characters' condition.

=== Sales ===
According to Robot Gentleman, 60 Seconds! sold almost 30,000 copies in its first month after release, surpassing their expectations of 10,000 copies sold within the first year. The team claimed that videos made by YouTubers playing the game contributed to its longevity, attributing sales spikes to videos by PewDiePie and Markiplier.

The mobile version recovered its development costs within its first week of sales, which also surprised the studio.

== Accolades ==
Year	Event	Category	Result	Reference
2015	IndieCade Festival	Official selection	Finalist	
2017	Digital Dragons Awards	Best Polish Mobile Game of 2016	Nominated	
2017	Indie Prize Singapore	Official Showcase	Nominated	
2018	Digital Dragons Awards	Best Polish Mobile Game of 2017	Nominated	

== Related games ==
60 Parsecs! was released on Steam on September 18, 2018. Set aboard a space station, it contains similar mechanics and gameplay focused on survival, plus other new elements.

A remaster of the original game, titled 60 Seconds! Reatomized, was released on July 25, 2019. It features technical improvements, such as revamped graphics and an updated interface. The gameplay contains a new relationship system, adding interactions between family members, as well as a storyline spanning multiple playthroughs.
