= 62nd Reserve Artillery Regiment (Ireland) =

- Allegiance: Ireland
- Branch: Irish Army
- Type: Artillery
- Garrison/HQ: McKee Barracks

The 62 Reserve Artillery Regiment was a combat support unit of then 2 Eastern Reserve Brigade of the Irish Reserve Defence Forces. The Regiment maintained field gun batteries in the Defence Forces Training Center in the Curragh, County Kildare and at McKee Barracks in Dublin City, and drew its members from all walks of life in the Kildare, Offaly and North Dublin areas. The members were volunteer reservists with no specific criteria essential to enlist apart from a basic medical examination.

62 Regiment was formed by the amalgamation of 6 and 7 Field Artillery Regiments following the re-organisation of the Reserve Defence Forces in 2005.

== Organisation ==
62 Regiment comprised a Regimental Headquarters, Headquarters battery and 3 Field Gun Batteries.

The Army Reserve from 2005 to 2013 comprised three brigades, organised along the standard infantry brigade model, plus the Reserve Defence Forces Training Authority. The brigades mirrored the organisation of the Permanent Defence Force and each unit within the Reserve Brigades had an affiliated Permanent Defence Force unit with which it has a direct working and support relationship.

Brigade Units, such as 62 Reserve Artillery Regiment, were affiliated with similar units in the relevant Brigade of the Permanent Defence Force.

== Artillery Weapons ==
105mm Light Gun, 120mm RUAG Heavy Mortar. The 25-pounder was formerly used, with the last shoot within the regiment occurring on Wednesday, July 22, 2009.

== 2 Eastern Reserve Brigade ==
2 Eastern Reserve Brigade was affiliated with the 2 Eastern Brigade of the Permanent Defence Force. In this capacity it could have been called upon to provide support to the 2 Eastern Brigade in the security and administrative roles in the counties of Dublin, Kildare, Louth, Monaghan, Meath and Wicklow, although this never happened during its existence.
