= 62nd Division =

In military terms, 62nd Division may refer to:

== Infantry divisions ==
- 62nd Division (People's Republic of China)
- 62nd Infantry Division (Wehrmacht), Germany
- 62nd Volksgrenadier Division, Germany
- 62nd Infantry Division "Marmarica", Italian Army, WWII
- 62nd Division (Imperial Japanese Army)
- 62nd Infantry Division (Russian Empire)
- 62nd Guards Motor Rifle Division, Soviet Union, earlier the 62nd Guards Mechanized Division
- 62nd Guards Rifle Division, Soviet Union
- 62nd Motor Rifle Division, Soviet Union
- 62nd Rifle Division, Soviet Union
- 62nd Division (Syria)
- 62nd (2nd West Riding) Division, United Kingdom
- 62nd Infantry Division (United States), planned during WWII but never formed

== Cavalry divisions ==
- 62nd Cavalry Division (United States)

== Other divisions ==
- 62nd Rocket Division, Soviet Union

== See also ==
- List of military divisions by number
- 62nd Brigade (disambiguation)
- 62nd Regiment (disambiguation)
