= 62nd Motor Rifle Division =

Motor rifle division of the Soviet military

- Active: 1972–1989
- Country: Soviet Union
- Branch: Soviet Army
- Type: Motorized infantry
- Garrison/HQ: Itatka

The 62nd Motor Rifle Division was a motorized infantry division of the Soviet Army. It was originally formed as a mobilization division in 1972 but became a regular division months later. It became a storage base in 1989 and was disbanded in 1994.

== History ==
The 62nd Motor Rifle Division was activated on 31 January 1972 in Maykop, part of the 12th Army Corps. It was an unmanned mobilization division and its equipment was co-located with the 9th Motor Rifle Division. In May, the division became a regular unit and moved to Itatka, Tomsk Oblast. It became part of the 33rd Army Corps. During the Cold War, the division was maintained at 23% strength as a Cadre High Strength division, in American terms a Category III division. Between 1987 and 1988 future Ministry of Emergency Situations Lieutenant General Viktor Kapkanschikov served as chief of staff of its 1099th Motor Rifle Regiment. On 1 October 1989, it became the 5352nd Weapons and Equipment Storage Base and moved to Omsk. In June 1991, the base became part of the Siberian Military District and was disbanded in 1994.

== Composition ==
In 1988, the division included the following units.

- 1092nd Motor Rifle Regiment
- 1099th Motor Rifle Regiment
- 1100th Motor Rifle Regiment – equipped with BTR
- 107th Tank Regiment
- 619th Artillery Regiment
- 676th Anti-Aircraft Artillery Regiment
- 1258th Separate Missile Battalion
- 1263 Separate Anti-Tank Artillery Battalion
- 1263rd Separate Reconnaissance Battalion
- Separate Engineer-Sapper Battalion
- 1770th Separate Communications Battalion
- Separate Chemical Defense Company
- 685th Separate Equipment Maintenance and Recovery Battalion
- Separate Medical Battalion
- Separate Material Supply Battalion
