= 62nd Regiment of Foot (disambiguation) =

The 62nd Regiment of Foot may refer to:

- 62nd Regiment of Foot (1742), created in 1742 as Battereau's Regiment
- 60th (Royal American) Regiment of Foot, later the King's Royal Rifle Corps, known as the 62nd (Royal American) Regiment of Foot between 1755 and 1757
- 77th Regiment of Foot (Montgomerie's Highlanders), known as the 62nd Regiment of Foot for a short period in 1757
- 62nd (Wiltshire) Regiment of Foot, which existed between 1758 and its amalgamation to form the Wiltshire Regiment in 1881
