= 60th Massachusetts Infantry Regiment =

60th Massachusetts Volunteer Infantry
- Active: 1 August 1864 to 30 November 1864
- Country: United States of America
- Allegiance: Union
- Branch: United States Army
- Type: Infantry
- Size: 927
- Engagements: American Civil War

Commanders
- Colonel: Ansel Dyer Wass

The 60th Regiment Massachusetts Volunteer Infantry was an infantry regiment that served in the Union Army during the American Civil War from 1864 to 1865.

== History ==
The regiment began its organization at Readville, Massachusetts during the summer of 1864, with the volunteers being mustered in from 14 to 30 July. On 1 August, they were ordered to report to Washington, DC and from there to Baltimore, Maryland. When their commanding officer, Colonel Ansel Dyer Wass (formerly of the 6th Massachusetts Militia) joined them, the regiment was sent to Indianapolis, Indiana. They were sent there "on account of the conspiracy of an extensive organization known as the Knights of the Golden Circle or Sons of Liberty". They remained in Indiana during their term of service, and were mustered out on 30 Nov 1864.

While camped in Indianapolis during an October 1864 gubernatorial election, some controversy with the regiment came about. It was claimed that some soldiers of this regiment "voted a dozen times each, and some claimed they had done so twenty-five times for the Republican candidate", Oliver P. Morton, who was elected governor.

== Casualties ==
They were not involved in any battles or skirmishes, but lost 11 soldiers to disease.

== See also ==
- List of Massachusetts Civil War Units
- Massachusetts in the American Civil War
