= 62nd Brigade =

62nd Brigade may refer to:

== British India ==
- 62nd Indian Infantry Brigade

== Ukraine ==
- 62nd Mechanized Brigade (Ukraine)

== United Kingdom ==
- 62nd Anti-Aircraft Brigade
- 62nd Brigade (United Kingdom)

=== Artillery units ===
- 62nd Brigade, Royal Field Artillery, British Army unit during World War I
- 62nd (2nd West Riding) Trench Mortar Brigade, Royal Field Artillery, British Army unit during World War I
- 62nd (North Midland) Brigade, Royal Field Artillery, British Army unit after World War I
- 62nd (Northumbrian) Anti-Aircraft Brigade, Royal Artillery
- 62nd (Scottish) Medium Brigade, Royal Artillery

== United States ==
- 62nd Field Artillery Brigade
- 62nd Medical Brigade, United States Army

== See also ==
- 62nd Division (disambiguation)
- 62nd Regiment (disambiguation)
