= 51st Massachusetts Infantry Regiment =

51st Regiment Massachusetts Volunteer Infantry
- Active: September 25, 1862 – July 27, 1863
- Country: United States of America
- Allegiance: Union
- Branch: Union Army
- Type: Infantry
- Engagements: American Civil War: Battle of Kinston; Battle of White Hall; Battle of Goldsborough Bridge; Occupation of Harpers Ferry (1863); Pursuit of Lee (July 1863)

Commanders
- Colonel: Augustus B. R. Sprague

The 51st Regiment Massachusetts Volunteer Infantry was a regiment of infantry that served in the Union Army during the American Civil War. The regiment was assigned to Major General John G. Foster's Department of North Carolina, later designated as the XVIII Corps. While based in New Bern, North Carolina, the 51st Massachusetts took part in several expeditions involving numerous units from Foster's command and were engaged in the Battle of Kinston, the Battle of White Hall and the Battle of Goldsborough Bridge, among other engagements.

== History ==
The Fifty-first Regiment was organized at Worcester September 25 to October 30, 1862, during which time Thomas Wentworth Higginson became a captain in the unit. November 25–30, the unit moved to Boston, and from there to New Bern, North Carolina.

=== Attachments ===
- 1st Brigade, 1st Division, Department of North Carolina, until December 1862.
- Amory's Brigade, Department of North Carolina, until January 1863.
- 1st Brigade, 1st Division, 18th Army Corps, Department of North Carolina, until June 1863.
- 8th Army Corps in the Middle Department until July 1863.
- Temporarily to the 1st Army Corps, Army Potomac, July 1863.

=== Service ===
- Foster's Expedition to Goldsborough, North Carolina, December 11–20, 1862.
  - Battle at Kinston December 14.
  - Battle at Whitehall in North Carolina December 16.
  - Battle at Goldsborough Bridge December 17.
- Duty at Newberne until March 1863.
- Expedition to Trenton, Pollocksville, Young's Cross Roads and Onslow, January 17–21, 1863.
- Companies "A," "B," "C," "D," "H," "I," "K" guard and outpost duty by detachments on railroad between Newberne and Morehead City, March 2 to May 4.
- Companies "A" and "C" at Morehead City.
- Company "C" at Fort Macon March 30 to May 5. "B," "D," "H" and "I" at Newport. "K" at Evans' Mills. "E" and "F" at Beaufort and "G" at Brice's Ferry. Headquarters at Beaufort, North Carolina.
- Moved to Newberne May 4, and duty there till June 24.
- Moved to Fort Monroe, Virginia, thence to White House June 24–28.
- Moved to Baltimore, Maryland, June 29-July 1.
- Moved to Monocacy Junction, Frederick and Sandy Hook July 6–7.
- Occupation of Harper's Ferry, West Virginia, July 8.
- March to Funkstown, Maryland, July 12–13, and join 1st Army Corps. Pursuit of Lee.
- March to Berlin July 15–17.
- Moved to Worcester, July 17–21.

Mustered out July 27, 1863.

Records show that no members of the 51st were killed in battle, but 44 enlisted men died of disease in the nine months service.

== See also ==
- List of Massachusetts Civil War units
- Massachusetts in the Civil War
