= Courtmacsherry =

Seaside village in County Cork, Ireland

Courtmacsherry Cúirt Mhic Shéafraidh
- Village
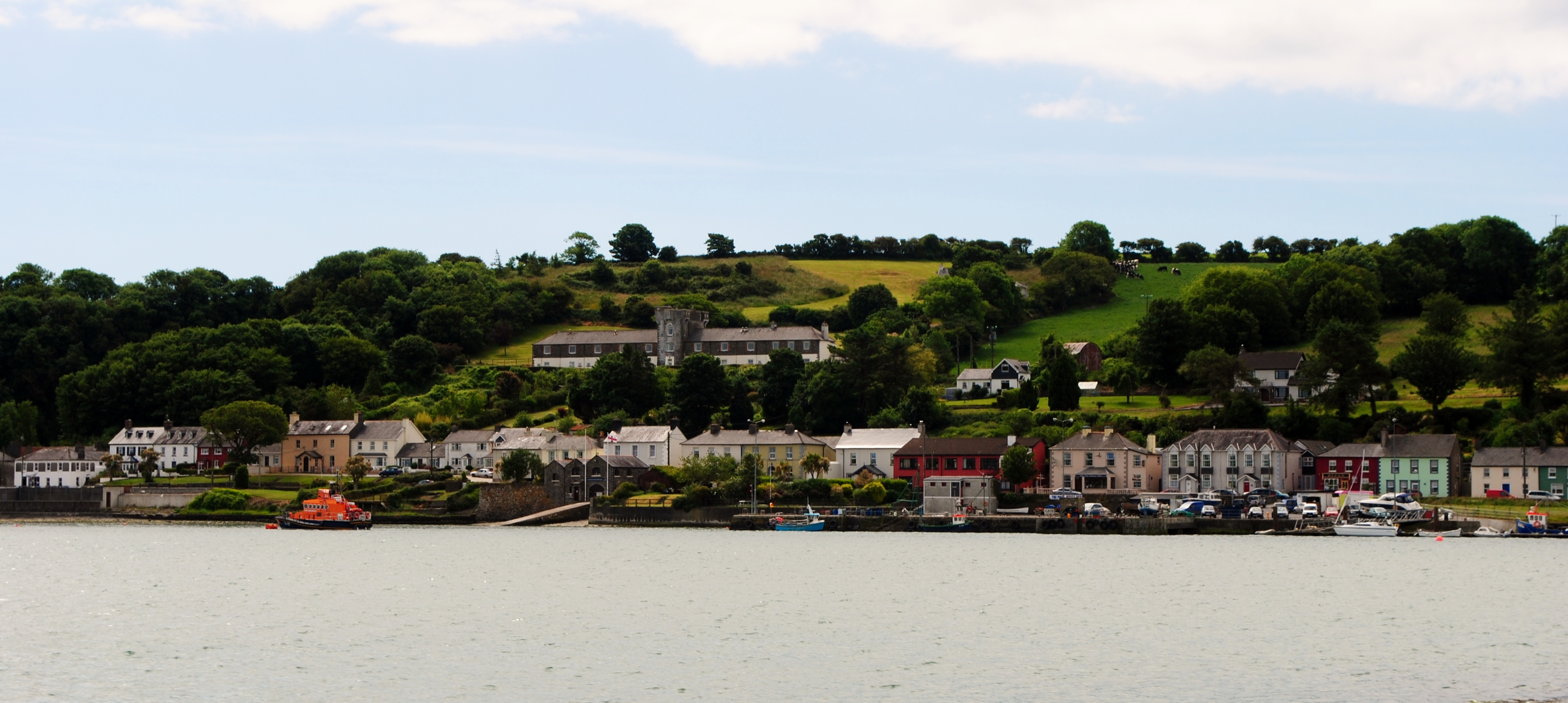

- Location in Ireland
- Coordinates: 51°38′05″N 08°42′33″W
- Country: Ireland
- Province: Munster
- County: County Cork
- Barony: Ibane and Barryroe

Population (2022)
  - Total: 639
- Time zone: UTC+0 (WET)
  - Summer (DST): UTC+1 (IST (WEST))
- Website: courtmacsherry.ie

Courtmacsherry (Irish: Cúirt Mhic Shéafraidh, meaning 'MacSherry's Court'), often referred to by locals as Courtmac, is a seaside village in County Cork, on the southwest coast of Ireland. It is 33 kilometres (21 mi) southwest of Cork city. The nearest town is Clonakilty, 13 kilometres (8 mi) to the west (16 km by road). The village consists of a single long street on the southern shore of Courtmacsherry Bay, with thick woods on rising ground behind. The woods (planted by the Earl of Shannon in the late 18th century) continue beyond the village eastwards to the open sea, ending at Wood Point. Between the village and "The Point", the trees run right to the water's edge and there are several natural bathing coves along the way. The village is located in the Barony of Ibane and Barryroe.

== History ==
Around the time of the Norman invasion of Ireland, the major townships in the area were those now known as Timoleague, Lislee, Barryroe and Dunworly. The Normans built a fortified house near the modern site of the Courtmacsherry Hotel. Among the Norman settlers were the De Barrys and the Hodnetts; the former built a castle at Timoleague, and the latter settled in Lislee. The Barrys flourished and gave their name to Barryroe, Rathbarry, etc., whereas the Hodnetts "degenerated into mere Irish", one branch changing their name to Mac Seafraidh (son of Geoffrey), subsequently anglicised to MacSherry or McSharry. Although Barrys and Hodnetts still live in the district, there are no MacSherrys.

One, Patrick McSherry (1725-1795) from the County Armagh side of Newry in the south-east of Ulster, a descendant of a Courtmacsherry Hodnett, emigrated to America in 1745 and founded McSherrystown in Adams County, Pennsylvania.

In 1760, the First Earl of Shannon, Henry Boyle, inherited the Boyle estate in the region of Barryroe, which included the Courtmacsherry area. His grandson Henry Boyle, 3rd Earl of Shannon arranged for the building of Courtmacsherry House in the 1840s, as a family residence. Following the third Earl's death in 1842, his six adult daughters (known as "the Ladies Boyle") were granted the Courtmacsherry estate of 6,000 acres. The last of the third Earl's daughters died in 1894, at which point Courtmacsherry estate reverted to the Boyle estate. The Boyle estate was then in the possession of Richard Boyle, 6th Earl of Shannon, and the grandnephew of "the Ladies Boyle". Boyle leased Courtmacsherry House and 10 acres of land to a Bandon businessman, James Brennan, in 1897. Brennan opened Courtmacsherry House as a hotel. In 1923, Robert Henry Boyle, 8th Earl of Shannon (1900–1963) converted this lease into a sale, and since then, Courtmacsherry House has been the location of the Courtmacsherry Hotel.

The Grand Jury Map of County Cork, published in 1811, shows Courtmacsherry as a small cluster of houses near Wood Point.

== Climate ==
Courtmacsherry is the mildest place in Ireland, with a mean annual temperature of 11^{o}. The climate zone is Cfb, temperate maritime.

Climate data for Courtmacsherry
Month	Jan	Feb	Mar	Apr	May	Jun	Jul	Aug	Sep	Oct	Nov	Dec	Year
Mean daily maximum °C (°F)	9.0 (48.2)	8.8 (47.8)	9.5 (49.1)	11.0 (51.8)	13.3 (55.9)	15.8 (60.4)	17.4 (63.3)	17.4 (63.3)	16.1 (61.0)	13.6 (56.5)	10.9 (51.6)	9.5 (49.1)	12.7 (54.8)
Daily mean °C (°F)	7.5 (45.5)	7.2 (45.0)	7.7 (45.9)	9.1 (48.4)	11.4 (52.5)	14.0 (57.2)	15.6 (60.1)	15.6 (60.1)	14.4 (57.9)	12.2 (54.0)	9.5 (49.1)	8.1 (46.6)	11.0 (51.9)
Mean daily minimum °C (°F)	6.0 (42.8)	5.6 (42.1)	6.0 (42.8)	7.2 (45.0)	9.5 (49.1)	12.0 (53.6)	13.7 (56.7)	13.8 (56.8)	12.7 (54.9)	10.7 (51.3)	7.9 (46.2)	6.6 (43.9)	9.3 (48.8)
Average precipitation mm (inches)	109 (4.3)	86 (3.4)	78 (3.1)	78 (3.1)	76 (3.0)	76 (3.0)	77 (3.0)	79 (3.1)	80 (3.1)	111 (4.4)	103 (4.1)	110 (4.3)	1,063 (41.9)
Source: Climate-Data

== Economy and amenities ==
The village's main industry consists of commercial and charter angling. A moderately sized tourist industry exists during the summer months. There are several beaches nearby, namely Dunworley Strand, Moloney Strand, Broadstrand and Blind Strand. The village has a hotel and a caravan park, catering mainly for visitors from Cork. About half of this new housing is owner-occupied, the remainder being rented to visitors.

There are several bars and pubs in and around the village. Courtmacsherry is an angling center, and known for its many record catches. There is also a festival at the end of July - the beginning of August. It also hosts a horse race meeting on the strand each year.

== Lifeboat ==
A lifeboat was placed at Courtmacsherry in December 1825, one of the first three in Ireland, by the Royal National Institution for the Preservation of Life from Shipwreck (RNIPLS). However, kept out in the open, the lifeboat fell into disrepair, and it is thought that it was no longer in use by 1840. This didn't stop the local Coastguard and fishermen from performing rescues, by means of their own open boats, and gallantry medals were awarded for rescues during this time.

The RNIPLS became the Royal National Lifeboat Institution (RNLI) in 1854, but it wasn't until 1867 that they established a lifeboat station at Courtmacsherry. A boathouse was constructed, and a 32-foot (10-oared) self-righting lifeboat, the City of Dublin, arrived in February 1867.

In 1901, the station received the Kezia Gwilt, a 37 ft (11 m) self-righting lifeboat, and a new boathouse and slipway was built at Barry's Point, approximately 5.6 kilometres (3.5 mi) south of Courtmacsherry. On 7 May 1915, the Kezia Gwilt was launched to aid RMS Lusitania which had been torpedoed off the Old Head of Kinsale. The Lusitania sank in just 17 minutes, with the loss of 1197 passengers and crew. Kezia Gwilt was the first 'rowed' boat to arrive, but after 6 hours hard rowing, she was too late to rescue any survivors.

While the station closed in 1928, it was reopened in 1929 and a new motor-powered lifeboat was located back at Courtmacsherry. The reopened lifeboat station was renamed 'Courtmacsherry Harbour'.

In January 2009, ultimately unsuccessful efforts were made by Courtmacsherry Lifeboat to save an 18 m (59 ft) fin whale, which was stranded at Kilbrittain, opposite Courtmacsherry. The whale's remains were preserved and are displayed in Kilbrittain.

Courtmacsherry Harbour lifeboat station has operated 13-45 Val Adnams (ON 1352), a Shannon-class All-weather lifeboat, since 2023.

== Transport ==
Courtmacsherry railway station on the Timoleague and Courtmacsherry Extension Light Railway opened on 23 April 1891, closed for passenger traffic on 24 February 1947 and for goods traffic on 10 March 1947, finally closing altogether on 1 April 1961. The line had three locomotives, Slaney, St. Molaga and Argadeen.

== Notable people ==
- Patrick Keohane (1879–1950), member of Robert Falcon Scott's Terra Nova Expedition Antarctic expedition of 1910–1913
- Robert Gookin (died 1666/7), Anglo-Irish captain in the English Parliamentary army in Ireland
- Edith Coghlan (1866–1931), poet

== See also ==
- List of towns and villages in the Republic of Ireland
- List of RNLI stations
