= Benjamin Flagg House =

Historic house in Massachusetts, United States

- U.S. National Register of Historic Places
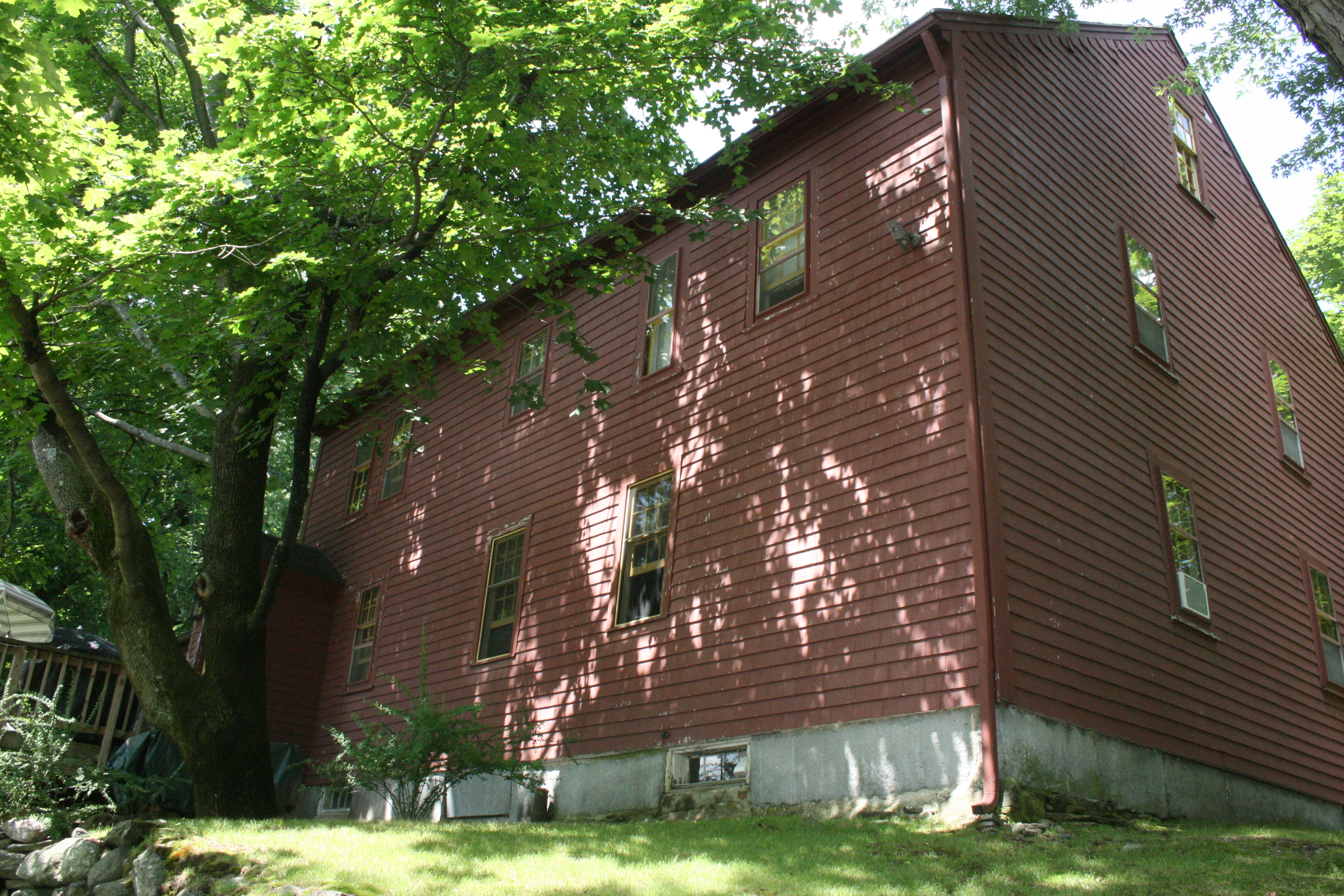

- Location within Massachusetts Location within the United States
- Location: 136 Plantation St., Worcester, Massachusetts
- Coordinates: 42°21′1″N 71°47′5″W
- Built: 1717
- Architectural style: Timber-frame Vernacular
- MPS: Worcester MRA
- NRHP reference No.: 80000620
- Added to NRHP: March 05, 1980

The Benjamin Flagg House is a historic house located at 136 Plantation Street in Worcester, Massachusetts. Built c. 1717, it is considered the oldest structure in the city. It was home to a number of generations of influential Flaggs, including American Revolutionary War Captain Benjamin Flagg (1724–1818). The house was listed on the National Register of Historic Places in 1980.

== Description and history ==
The Flagg House occupies a triangular lot on Worcester's east side, bounded on the west by Plantation Street and on the east by Ingleside Avenue. The house is a 2 1/2-story wood-frame structure, three bays wide, with a side-gable roof, large central chimney, and clapboard siding. Its center entrance (facing west toward Plantation Street) has modest trim, with a four-light transom window above.

The house is assumed to have been built about 1718, when Benjamin Flagg II purchased a large tract of land in the area; however, it is not known how much of the building is his original construction, and how much may have been later alteration. According to Caleb Wall's Reminiscences, Flagg's son, also named Benjamin, "commanded the company of militia, who marched with Col. Timothy Bigelow's company of minute men for Lexington, on the alarm, April 18, 1775, afterwards Colonel in the revolutionary service, filled important town offices, and died in Worcester, October 8, 1818, aged 95... Col. Flagg's location was on Plantation Street, on a farm of 150 acres..." The house was sold out of the Flagg family in 1850.

== See also ==
- National Register of Historic Places listings in eastern Worcester, Massachusetts
