= OGS =

OGS may refer to:

== Science and technology ==
- ESA Optical Ground Station, European Space Agency's ground-based observatory on Tenerife, Spain
- Oklahoma Geological Survey
- Ontario Genealogical Society
- Ontario Geological Survey
- OGS (electronic toll collection), was used on toll roads and bridges in Turkey. Now defunct.
- One Glass Solution, touchscreen technology

== Others ==
- Ogdensburg International Airport, New York
- Ole Gunnar Solskjær, former Norwegian footballer and current football manager
- Online-Go Server, a non-Java server for Go
- Ontario Graduate Scholarship, in Canada
- Oratory of the Good Shepherd, an international community within the Anglican Communion
- Österreichische Gebärdensprache, sign language used by the Austrian Deaf community
- Our Generation Speaks, a fellowship program and startup incubator
- Omega Graduate School, a graduate school located in Dayton, Tennessee
