= Benjamin LaGuer =

American convicted rapist

Benjamin LaGuer (May 1, 1963 – November 4, 2020) was an American convicted criminal who served a life sentence in Massachusetts for rape. He did not acknowledge the crime for which he was convicted, claiming innocence. His case achieved prominence in the late 1980s when reporting by John King discovered a juror who said that other members of the all-white-male jury uttered racist slurs before and during deliberations. His case became a flashpoint in the 2006 race for Massachusetts Governor when it was revealed that Deval Patrick, the Democratic candidate, had corresponded with and supported the inmate over a period of several years. In 2020, he died in a Massachusetts prison hospital of liver disease aged 57.

== Early life ==
LaGuer was born in The Bronx, New York, and grew up in New York and Puerto Rico until age 15, when he moved to Leominster, Massachusetts to live with a half sister who was his father's daughter from a previous marriage. He attended high school in Leominster before dropping out in late 1980 to join the Army, where he served in a support capacity in Germany. With a discharge from the Army, he returned to Leominster in June 1983. On the morning of July 13, 1983, police were summoned to his neighbor's apartment where they discovered a 59-year-old woman bound and beaten. It was quickly determined to be a rape case. Two days later, on July 15, 1983, LaGuer was charged with the crime. He proclaimed his innocence, but was convicted in Worcester Superior Court the following January and given a life sentence with eligibility for parole after 15 years.

== Challenges to the conviction ==
Soon after starting his prison term, LaGuer began studying in the law library and learned how to access the legal system on his own behalf and for other inmates. In 1991, a challenge LaGuer launched to his conviction two years earlier went all the way to the Massachusetts Supreme Judicial Court, which rendered a landmark ruling in LaGuer's favor. At issue was whether an affidavit given by juror William Nowick that other members of the all-white-male panel made racist comments before and during deliberations constituted a violation of LaGuer's right to a fair trial. Even though the state's high court sided with LaGuer as a matter of law, it did not overturn the verdict, instead sending it back to the trial judge, Robert Mulkern, for a finding of fact. After a hearing in which some jurors were called to testify, Judge Mulkern ruled that the jury's deliberations were not tainted by racism. LaGuer exhausted his last appeal of that decision in 1994, more than ten years after his conviction.

The case became well known among activists, academics, and journalists, who came to believe that LaGuer had suffered a gross miscarriage of justice. Starting in 1986, reporters who looked at the case found troubling questions about whether LaGuer in fact committed the crime. Among those who took an interest in the case and who corresponded with LaGuer were Nobel Peace Prize laureate Elie Wiesel, Pulitzer Prize winning author William Styron, Harvard University professor Henry Louis Gates Jr., Harvard Law School professor Charles Ogletree, and WBUR radio personality Jose Masso, who created the Benjamin LaGuer papers collection at Northeastern University. During that time LaGuer also earned a bachelor's degree magna cum laude from Boston University and won a first place International PEN award for an essay on his mother. In 1998, LaGuer was for the first time eligible for parole but was denied because he refused to admit to the crime. At that point he attracted an unlikely ally in Boston University president and 1990 Democratic candidate for governor of Massachusetts, John Silber, who helped arrange for pro bono legal representation. His team, which included members of McDermott Will & Emery, the law firm William Weld, Silber's opponent in the governor's race, had belonged to, successfully sued the parole board and forced a second hearing at which LaGuer was again denied parole.

== Response to a DNA test that backfired ==
His legal team, led by law professor David Siegel, a founding member of the New England Innocence Project, then sought and found the physical evidence from the crime and in 1999 McDermott Will & Emery managing partner Robert Cordy, now a member of the Massachusetts Supreme Judicial Court, wrote to the Worcester District Attorney in an attempt to establish a protocol for DNA testing. The district attorney, John Conte, a former State Senator appointed by Governor Michael Dukakis in 1976 to finish an unexpired term, rebuffed Cordy, in turn intimating that LaGuer's team may have tampered with the evidence. After more than two years of contentious and costly litigation a DNA test revealed a trace amount of LaGuer's genetic material in the evidence. Several forensic DNA experts, including Applied DNA Resources principal Theodore Kessis, John Jay College of Criminal Justice Associate Provost Lawrence Kobilinsky and Harvard University geneticist Daniel Hartl, questioned the DNA test, and called for an investigation into its validity.

LaGuer continued to maintain his innocence and attracted the pro bono services of another high powered international law firm, Goodwin Procter, where James C. Rehnquist, a partner at the firm and son of then U.S. Supreme Court Chief Justice William Rehnquist, took over LaGuer's case. In February 2004, Rehnquist filed a motion for a new trial in Worcester, Massachusetts Superior Court seeking a new trial on the basis of a Massachusetts State Police report generated the day LaGuer was arrested showing that four fingerprints found on the base of the trimline telephone, the cord of which was used to bind the victim's wrists, did not match the defendant's. This revelation prompted concern from several lawmakers, including State Senator Jarrett Barrios, who made a written inquiry to the State Police crime lab. Rehnquist's position that the suppression of potentially exculpatory evidence (revealed in November 2001, almost 18 years after the trial) constituted a violation of LaGuer's right to a fair trial, was rejected by Worcester Superior Court Judge Timothy Hillman. Rehnquist appealed the decision where he was again denied. In June 2006, the Massachusetts Supreme Judicial Court agreed to hear the case. On March 23, 2007, the Supreme Judicial Court unanimously upheld LaGuer's conviction.

== Political use of the LaGuer case in the Massachusetts Governor's race ==
In 2006, the LaGuer case became a dominant issue in the Massachusetts gubernatorial race between Republican Lieutenant Governor Kerry Healey and Democrat Deval Patrick. It was revealed that Patrick had petitioned the parole board in 1998 and 2000 for LaGuer's freedom and had contributed financially to the DNA testing. In his letters to the parole board Patrick characterized LaGuer as "thoughtful and eloquent." He was criticized in two widely used television ads, considered by some analysts to be among the most negative in the 2006 campaign season. In one ad featuring a woman walking alone in a parking garage, the narrator asks, "have you ever heard a woman compliment a rapist?" The ad was widely perceived as backfiring on Healey because of its negative tone. Patrick ultimately won the race by a margin of more than 20 percentage points.

== Developments since 2006 ==
The Massachusetts Supreme Judicial Court heard LaGuer's appeal on January 4, 2007, and a ruling was rendered on March 23, 2007. The SJC unanimously upheld LaGuer's conviction. Soon after the decision a former caretaker to the victim stepped forward with new information about the victim's state of mind before and after the crime which raised previously unknown questions about the reliability of her identification. In March 2009, retired Superior Court Judge Isaac Borentstein took the case.

On December 15, 2021, the University of Massachusetts announced that the Robert S. Cox Special Collections & University Archives had acquired LaGuer's prison papers and was making them the center of a repository of a growing collection relating to LaGuer's case, life, and emerging legacy.
