= 2010 Massachusetts gubernatorial election =

- November 2, 2010
- Turnout: 54.81% ▼1.42
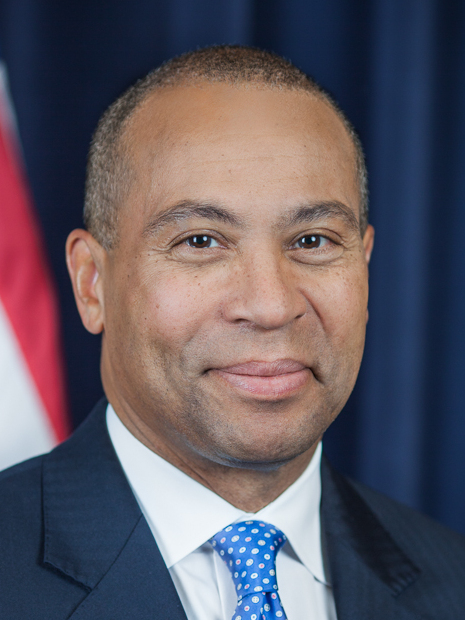

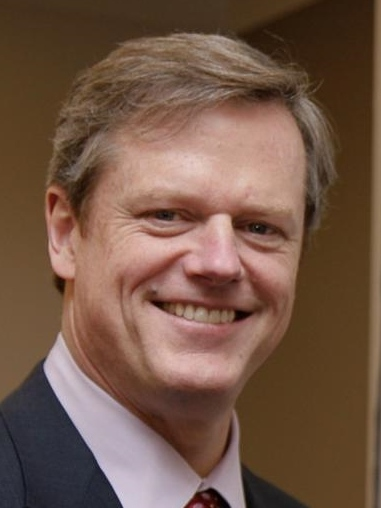

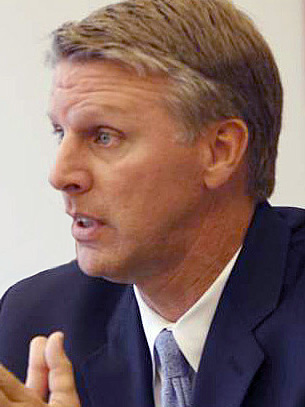
Nominee	Deval Patrick	Charlie Baker	Tim Cahill
Party	Democratic	Republican	Independent
Running mate	Tim Murray	Richard Tisei	Paul Loscocco (withdrawn)
Popular vote	1,112,283	964,866	184,395
Percentage	48.42%	42.00%	8.03%
- Patrick: 30–40% 40–50% 50–60% 60–70% 70–80% 80–90% >90% Baker: 30–40% 40–50% 50–60% 60–70% Cahill: 40–50% Tie: 40–50% No votes
Governor before election
Deval Patrick
Democratic
Elected Governor
Deval Patrick
Democratic

The 2010 Massachusetts gubernatorial election was held on November 2, 2010. Incumbent Democratic Governor Deval Patrick was re-elected to a second term.

Party primaries were held on September 14, though all four candidates ran unopposed in their respective primaries. Tim Murray, who ran on a ticket with Patrick, was re-elected lieutenant governor. This is the only gubernatorial election since 1994 in which the two major parties did not have a woman on the gubernatorial ticket.

== Democratic primary ==
=== Governor ===
==== Candidates ====
- Deval Patrick, incumbent governor

===== Withdrew =====
- Grace Ross, 2006 Green-Rainbow nominee for governor

==== Polling ====
Poll source	Dates administered	Deval Patrick	Grace Ross
Suffolk University	February 21–24, 2010	59%	15%

=== Lieutenant governor ===
==== Candidates ====
- Tim Murray, incumbent lieutenant governor

== Republican primary ==
=== Governor ===
==== Candidates ====
- Charlie Baker, CEO of Harvard Pilgrim Health Care and former secretary of administration and finance

===== Eliminated at convention =====
- Christy Mihos, independent candidate for governor in 2006

===== Declined =====
- Kerry Healey, former Lieutenant Governor and nominee in 2006
- Bob Hedlund, state senator from Weymouth
- Joe Malone, former state treasurer (ran for U.S. representative)
- Michael Sullivan, former U.S. attorney for the District of Massachusetts

==== Polling ====
Poll source	Dates administered	Charlie Baker	Christy Mihos
The Boston Globe/UNH	July 15–21, 2009	27%	20%
Suffolk University	November 4–8, 2009	30%	33%
Suffolk University	February 21–24, 2010	47%	17%

=== Lieutenant governor ===
==== Candidates ====
- Richard Tisei, minority Leader of the Massachusetts State Senate

== General election ==
=== Candidates ===
- Charlie Baker, CEO of Harvard Pilgrim Health Care (Republican)

- Running mate: Richard Tisei, minority Leader of the Massachusetts State Senate

- Tim Cahill, state treasurer and receiver-general (Independent)

- Running mate: Paul Loscocco, former Republican state representative

- Deval Patrick, incumbent governor (Democratic)

- Running mate: Tim Murray, incumbent lieutenant governor

- Jill Stein, medical internist and co-chairperson of the Massachusetts Green-Rainbow Party (Green-Rainbow)

- Running mate: Richard P. Purcell, surgery clerk and ergonomics assessor

=== Campaign ===
==== Defection of Loscocco ====
On October 1, 2010, Loscocco announced that he would withdraw from the race and endorse Republican candidate Charlie Baker. Loscocco formally remained on the ballot, however. On October 7, Cahill filed a lawsuit against four former campaign aides, alleging that they had conspired to undermine his candidacy and help Baker by arranging his defection. Cahill claimed that e-mails between Republican political consultants and Loscocco's top aide suggested that Loscocco might have been enticed to leave the ticket by future job promises. In response, Loscocco claimed that Cahill's top aide was coordinating strategy with the Patrick campaign and the Democratic Governors' Association, and thus was never actually an independent effort.

==== Lottery ad ====
Soon after Cahill filed suit against him, Adam Meldrum, Cahill's former campaign manager, alleged that Cahill had colluded with the Massachusetts Lottery, which is overseen by the state treasurer's office, to run an ad favorable to him during the campaign. The ad, paid for by the Commonwealth, described the Massachusetts Lottery as "the most successful state lottery in America" and "consistently well-managed", echoing themes from Cahill's gubernatorial campaign. Both Cahill and Massachusetts Lottery Director Mark Cavanagh denied the allegations. On October 18, e-mails released in conjunction with Cahill's lawsuit appeared to reveal that the campaign attempted to have the lottery air a series of ads that praised the lottery's management. In the e-mails, Cahill's campaign media strategist Dane Strother told Meldrum to "Get the Lottery immediately cutting a spot and get it up...Needs to focus on the Lottery being the best in the country and above reproach." Two days later, Cahill's senior adviser Scott Campbell wrote, "I think the first thing is to figure out what/where/how we want to do this ... with Lottery people."

On April 2, 2012, Cahill was indicted by a grand jury on charges that he had used $1.65 million of Massachusetts State Lottery advertising to aid his campaign for governor. On December 12, 2012, a mistrial was declared in the corruption case after the jury failed to reach a verdict on two counts of conspiracy.

=== Predictions ===
Source	Ranking	As of
Cook Political Report	Tossup	October 14, 2010
Rothenberg	Tilt D	October 28, 2010
RealClearPolitics	Tossup	November 1, 2010
Sabato's Crystal Ball	Lean D	October 28, 2010
CQ Politics	Tossup	October 28, 2010

=== Polling ===
View source data.

Poll	Date	Deval Patrick (D)	Charlie Baker (R)	Tim Cahill (I)	Jill Stein (GR)
Rasmussen Reports	June 24, 2009	41%	36%	–	–
The Boston Globe/UNH	July 15–21, 2009	30%	20%	30%	–
The Boston Globe/UNH	July 15–21, 2009	35%	41%	–	–
Rasmussen Reports	October 22, 2009	34%	24%	23%	–
Suffolk University	November 4–8, 2009	38%	15%	26%	–
Rasmussen Reports	November 23, 2009	33%	28%	25%	–
The Boston Globe/UNH	January 2–6, 2010	30%	19%	23%	–
Public Policy Polling	January 7–9, 2010	29%	27%	21%	–
Suffolk University	February 21–24, 2010	33%	25%	23%	3%
Rasmussen Reports	March 8, 2010	35%	32%	19%	–
Rasmussen Reports	April 5, 2010	35%	27%	23%	–
April 17 – Baker secures Republican nomination at convention; Mihos eliminated
Rasmussen Reports	May 10, 2010	45%	31%	14%	1%
Suffolk University	May 25, 2010	42%	29%	14%	8%
Rasmussen Reports	June 21, 2010	41%	34%	16%	–
The Boston Globe/UNH	June 17–23, 2010	38%	31%	9%	2%
Rasmussen Reports	July 22, 2010	38%	32%	17%	–
Statehouse News	August 29–31, 2010	34%	28%	18%	4%
Rasmussen Reports	September 1, 2010	39%	34%	18%	–
Rasmussen Reports	September 17, 2010	45%	42%	5%	–
Suffolk University /7 News	September 16–19, 2010	41%	34%	14%	4%
The Boston Globe/UNH	September 17–22, 2010	35%	34%	11%	4%
Western New England College	September 19–23, 2010	39%	33%	16%	3%
Rasmussen Reports	September 30, 2010	47%	42%	6%	–
Suffolk University 7 News	October 10–12, 2010	46%	39%	10%	1%
Public Opinion Strategies	October 11–13, 2010	35%	42%	10%	2%
Rasmussen Reports	October 18, 2010	47%	42%	6%	–
Western New England College	October 22, 2010	44%	36%	8%	5%
Boston Globe	October 24, 2010	43%	39%	8%	2%
Suffolk University/7News	October 25–27, 2010	46%	39%	9%	2%
Rasmussen Reports	October 27, 2010	46%	44%	6%	—
Western New England College	October 24–28, 2010	42%	37%	11%	3%
Results (for comparison)	[November 2, 2010]	[ 48.4% ]	[ 42.0% ]	[ 8.0% ]	[ 1.4% ]

Hypothetical polling

with Christy Mihos

Poll source	Dates administered	Deval Patrick	Christy Mihos	Jill Stein	Tim Cahill
Rasmussen Reports	June 24, 2009	40%	41%	––	––
The Boston Globe/UNH	July 15–21, 2009	31%	18%	––	31%
The Boston Globe/UNH	July 15–21, 2009	40%	41%	––	––
Rasmussen Reports	August 20, 2009	35%	40%	––	––
Rasmussen Reports	October 22, 2009	34%	23%	––	23%
Suffolk University	November 4–8, 2009	36%	20%	––	26%
Rasmussen Reports	November 23, 2009	32%	26%	––	28%
The Boston Globe/UNH	January 2–6, 2010	32%	19%	––	23%
Public Policy Polling	January 7–9, 2010	28%	21%	––	25%
Suffolk University	February 21–24, 2010	34%	19%	3%	26%
Rasmussen Reports	March 8, 2010	34%	19%	––	30%
Rasmussen Reports	April 5, 2010	38%	15%	––	33%

with Grace Ross

Poll source	Dates administered	Grace Ross	Charlie Baker	Tim Cahill
Rasmussen Reports	May 10, 2010	27%	32%	16%

=== Fundraising ===
As of October 31, 2010. Shading indicates candidate with the highest amount.

Candidate (party)	Raised	Spent	Balance
Tim Cahill (I)	$570,345.01	$277,655.73	$292,689.28
Charlie Baker (R)	$736,877.30	$491,089.99	$245,787.31
Deval Patrick (D)	$606,991.19	$459,858.16	$147,133.03
Jill Stein (G)	$64,454.75	$22,068.50	$42,386.25

=== Results ===

2010 Massachusetts gubernatorial election
Party	Candidate	Votes	%	±%
Democratic	Deval Patrick (incumbent)	1,112,283	48.42	▼7.21
Republican	Charlie Baker	964,866	42.00	▲6.67
Independent	Tim Cahill	184,395	8.03	▲1.06
Green-Rainbow	Jill Stein	32,895	1.43	▼0.51
Write-in	All others	2,600	0.11	▼0.01
Total votes		2,297,039		
	Blank	22,924		
Turnout		2,319,963		
Majority		147,417	6.41	
Democratic hold		Swing	–13.88	

==== By county ====
2010 United States gubernatorial election in Massachusetts (by county)
County	Patrick %	Patrick #	Baker %	Baker #	Others %	Others #	Total #
Barnstable	44.18%	47,124	47.45%	50,609	8.37%	8,930	106,663
Berkshire	71.15%	30,269	21.78%	9,266	7.06%	3,006	42,541
Bristol	47.23%	81,059	42.66%	73,220	10.11%	17,340	171,619
Dukes	58.37%	4,908	32.79%	2,757	8.85%	744	8,409
Essex	43.56%	116,360	47.90%	127,964	8.54%	22,827	267,151
Franklin	61.45%	17,068	24.62%	6,838	13.93%	3,868	27,774
Hampden	46.01%	62,816	40.03%	54,653	13.97%	19,071	136,540
Hampshire	58.91%	33,317	28.28%	15,994	12.81%	7,246	56,557
Middlesex	51.36%	283,221	40.90%	226,272	7.73%	42,846	553,477
Nantucket	52.08%	2,454	39.18%	1,846	8.74%	412	4,712
Norfolk	44.19%	119,806	44.20%	119,850	11.61%	31,489	271,145
Plymouth	38.63%	74,355	50.19%	96,592	11.19%	21,512	192,459
Suffolk	67.66%	125,961	25.15%	46,822	7.19%	13,377	186,160
Worcester	41.76%	113,565	48.61%	132,183	9.63%	26,182	271,930

Counties that flipped from Democratic to Republican

- Barnstable (largest municipality: Barnstable)
- Essex (largest municipality: Lynn)
- Norfolk (largest municipality: Quincy)
- Plymouth (largest municipality: Brockton)
- Worcester (largest municipality: Worcester)

== See also ==
- 2009–2010 Massachusetts legislature
- 2010 United States gubernatorial elections
