= Deval Patrick =

Governor of Massachusetts from 2007 to 2015

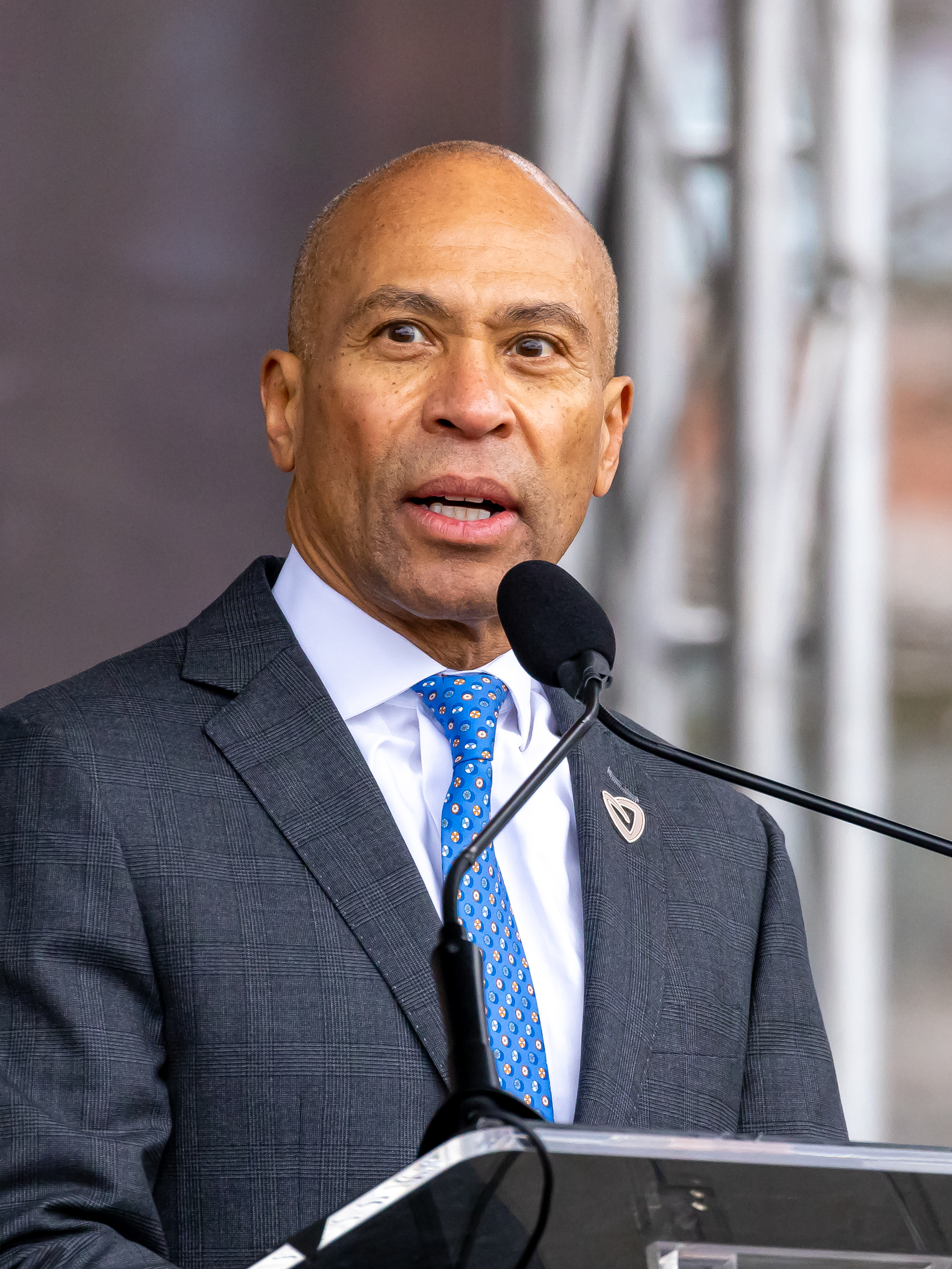
- Patrick in 2023

71st Governor of Massachusetts
- In office January 4, 2007 – January 8, 2015
- Lieutenant: Tim Murray
- Preceded by: Mitt Romney
- Succeeded by: Charlie Baker

United States Assistant Attorney General for the Civil Rights Division
- In office April 22, 1994 – January 20, 1997
- President: Bill Clinton
- Preceded by: John R. Dunne
- Succeeded by: Bill Lann Lee

Personal details
- Born: Deval Laurdine Patrick; July 31, 1956 (age 70) Chicago, Illinois, U.S.
- Party: Democratic
- Spouse: Diane Bemus (m. 1984)
- Children: 2
- Education: Harvard University (BA, JD)

Deval Laurdine Patrick (born July 31, 1956) is an American politician who served as the 71st governor of Massachusetts from 2007 to 2015. He was the first African-American governor of Massachusetts and the first Democratic governor of the state since Michael Dukakis left office in 1991. Patrick served from 1994 to 1997 as the United States assistant attorney general for the Civil Rights Division under President Bill Clinton. He was briefly a candidate for president of the United States in the 2020 U.S. presidential election.

Raised on the South Side of Chicago, Patrick earned a scholarship to Milton Academy in Milton, Massachusetts, in the eighth grade. He went on to attend Harvard College and Harvard Law School. After graduating, he practiced law with the NAACP Legal Defense and Educational Fund and later joined a Boston law firm, where he was later named a partner. In 1994, Bill Clinton appointed him as the United States assistant attorney general for the civil rights division of the United States Department of Justice, where he worked on issues including racial profiling and police misconduct. He was first elected governor in 2006, succeeding Mitt Romney, who chose not to run for reelection, and was reelected in 2010.

During his governorship, Patrick oversaw the implementation of the state's 2006 health care reform program which had been enacted under Mitt Romney, increased funding to education and life sciences, won a federal Race to the Top education grant, passed an overhaul of governance of the state transportation function, signing a law to create the Massachusetts Department of Transportation, increased the state sales tax from 5% to 6.25%, raised the state's minimum wage from $8 per hour to $11 by 2017, and planned the introduction of casinos to the state. Under Patrick, Massachusetts joined the Regional Greenhouse Gas Initiative (RGGI) in an effort to reduce greenhouse gas emissions. Shortly after Patrick's second term began on January 6, 2011, he declared he would not seek re-election in 2014.

After his governorship, Patrick served as managing director at Bain Capital. He also served as the chairman of the board for Our Generation Speaks, a fellowship program and startup incubator whose mission is to bring together young Israeli and Palestinian leaders through entrepreneurship. He also holds a board of directors position at telehealth company American Well. Members of his own inner circle and Barack Obama's inner circle encouraged Patrick to run for president in 2020, but Patrick ruled out a 2020 presidential bid in December 2018. He entered the race on November 14, 2019, but ended his campaign only three months later following a poor showing in the Iowa caucus and the New Hampshire primary.

== Early life and education ==
Patrick was born on July 31, 1956, in the South Side of Chicago, where his family resided in a two-bedroom apartment in the Robert Taylor Homes' housing projects. Patrick is the son of Emily Mae (née Wintersmith) and Pat Patrick, a jazz musician associated with Sun Ra. In 1959, Patrick's father abandoned their family in order to play music in New York City, and because he had fathered a daughter, La'Shon Anthony, by another woman. Patrick reportedly had a strained relationship with his father, who opposed his choice of high school, but they eventually reconciled. Patrick was raised by his mother, who traces her roots to American slaves in Kentucky.

While Patrick was in middle school, one of his teachers referred him to A Better Chance, a national non-profit organization for identifying, recruiting and developing leaders among academically gifted minority students, which enabled him to attend Milton Academy in Milton, Massachusetts. Patrick graduated from Milton Academy in 1974 and went on to attend college, the first in his family. He graduated from Harvard College, where he was a member of the Fly Club, with a Bachelor of Arts degree, cum laude, in English and American literature, in 1978. At Harvard, Patrick won "Best Oralist" in the Ames Moot Court Competition, in 1981. Among the competition's judges was Judge Henry Friendly.

Patrick graduated from Harvard Law School with a J.D., cum laude, in 1982. He proceeded to fail the State Bar of California exam twice, before passing on his third try. Patrick then served as a law clerk to Judge Stephen Reinhardt on the United States Court of Appeals for the Ninth Circuit for one year. In 1983, he joined the staff of the NAACP Legal Defense Fund (LDF), where he worked on death penalty and voting rights cases.

While at LDF, he met Bill Clinton, the then Governor of Arkansas, when he sued Clinton in a voting case. In 1986, he joined the Boston law firm of Hill & Barlow and was named partner in 1990, at the age of 34. While at Hill & Barlow, he managed high-profile engagements such as acting as Desiree Washington's attorney in her civil lawsuit against Mike Tyson.

== Professional career ==
=== Clinton administration ===
In 1994, President Bill Clinton nominated Patrick as the United States Assistant Attorney General for the Civil Rights Division, and he was subsequently confirmed by the United States Senate. Federal affirmative action policy was under judicial and political review, and Patrick defended Clinton's policy. Patrick also worked on issues including racial profiling, police misconduct, and the treatment of incarcerated criminals."

Between 1995 and 1997, Patrick coordinated an investigation into a series of arsons of predominantly black churches across the South. The investigation brought together a number of state and federal agencies, and was the largest federal investigation in history until the time of 9/11. In the end, more than 100 arrests were made, but no evidence of national or regional conspiracy was found.

=== Law career ===
In 1997, Patrick returned to Boston to join the firm of Day, Berry & Howard (later called Day Pitney LLP), and was appointed by the federal district court to serve as Chairman of Texaco's Equality and Fairness Task Force to oversee implementation of the terms of a race discrimination settlement. Working with employees at all levels, Patrick and his Task Force examined and reformed Texaco's complex corporate employment culture, and created a model for fostering an equitable workplace.

Some gay rights activists criticized him for his tenure on the United Airlines (UAL) board. During this time, the company originally fought an ordinance requiring that it offer domestic partnership benefits, but Patrick successfully encouraged UAL to offer such benefits to all employees, making it the first airline to do so.

=== Business career ===
In 1999, partly because of his work on the Equality and Fairness Task Force, Patrick was offered the job as General Counsel of Texaco, responsible for all of the company's legal affairs. While he continued his work transforming employment practices at the company, the majority of his time was devoted to exploring and working out a merger, ultimately announced in October 2000, with larger Chevron Corp.

In 2001, Patrick left Texaco to become the Executive Vice-President, General Counsel and Secretary at The Coca-Cola Company. Patrick pushed for a thorough review of allegations that some workers at bottlers of Coke products in Colombia had been abused or even killed by paramilitary groups as a result of union organizing activity. Patrick concluded the allegations to be unsubstantiated and untrue, but counseled that the company allow an independent inquiry to lay all questions to rest. After initially supporting Patrick's view, then-CEO Douglas Daft changed his mind, precipitating Patrick's decision to leave Coke.

From 2004 to 2006, he served on the board of directors of ACC Capital Holdings, the parent company of Ameriquest and Argent Mortgage. Ameriquest was the largest lender of so-called subprime mortgages and was under investigation by Attorneys General across the country. Patrick joined the board at the request of Ameriquest's founder, Roland Arnall, who asked for his help managing the investigations and changing the company's culture. During his tenure on the board, Ameriquest and Argent originated over $80 billion in subprime mortgages, but those conducting the investigation said that at the time Patrick left Ameriquest the company was on the road to change.

Following his career as governor, Patrick joined the private equity firm Bain Capital in 2015, where he served as a Managing Director.

In 2024, Patrick joined private equity firm The Vistria Group as a Senior Advisor, and was named a Senior Partner in November of that same year.

=== Higher education career ===
Patrick is a Hauser Leader at Harvard's Center for Public Leadership. Previously, he served as the David R. Gergen Professor of the Practice of Public Leadership at the Harvard Kennedy School, where he was co-director of the Center for Public Leadership from 2022 to 2024.

== Governor of Massachusetts ==
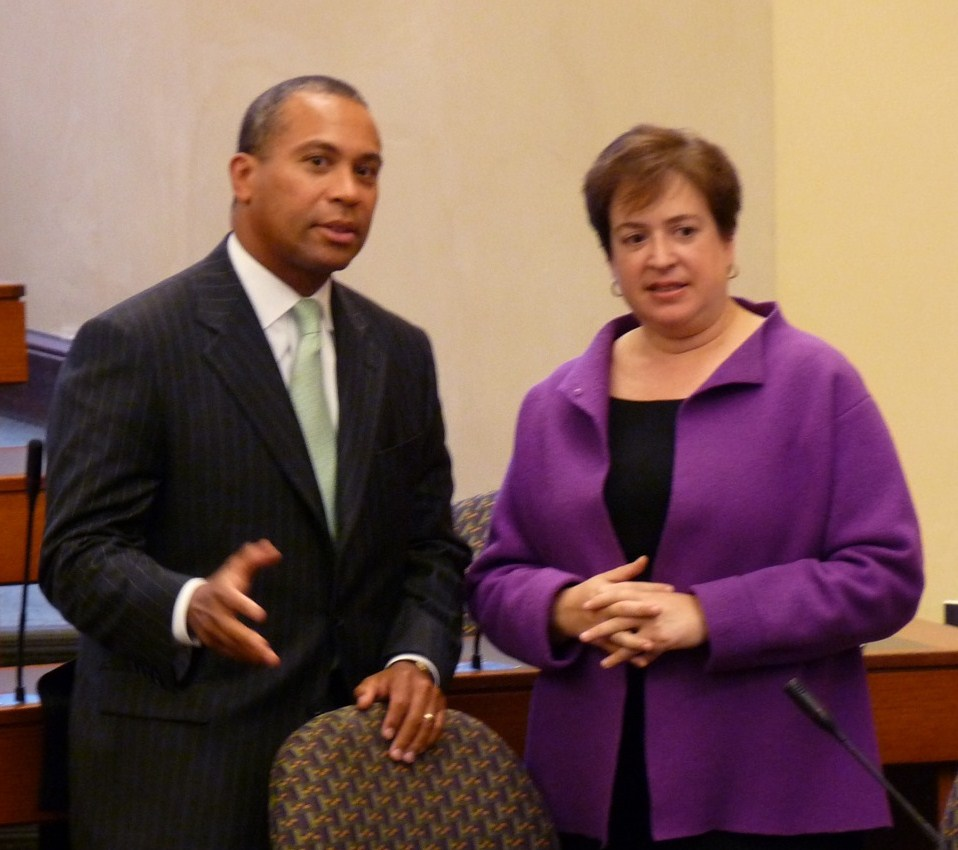
Patrick with future Supreme Court associate justice Elena Kagan at the Harvard Law School, in 2008.

Having been elected in 2006, Patrick took office as governor on January 4, 2007 and served two terms, leaving office on January 8, 2015, having not sought reelection to a third term.

Before taking office, Patrick assembled a transition team headed by lawyer Michael Angelini, bank executive Ronald Homer, and Weld administration economic affairs secretary Gloria Cordes Larson. In his first meetings with the legislative leadership, he proposed his first action would be to hire 1,000 new police officers and to expand full-day kindergarten statewide.

Breaking with the tradition of being inaugurated in the House Chamber of the Massachusetts State House, Patrick and Murray took their oaths of office, and Patrick delivered his inaugural address, outdoors on the West Portico of the State House facing Boston Common.

Doing this allowed a larger part of the public to witness the event, and was intended to signal a more open, transparent, and accessible government. In honor of his heritage, he took his oath of office on the Mendi Bible, which was given to then-Congressman John Quincy Adams by the freed American slaves from the ship La Amistad.

A series of regional inaugural balls, seven in total, were held to bring the inauguration to the citizens of the Commonwealth. The celebrations took place in Cape Cod, Worcester, Dartmouth, Pittsfield, Springfield, and Boston.

=== Elections ===
==== 2006 ====
In 2005, Patrick announced his candidacy for governor of Massachusetts. He was at first seen as a dark horse candidate, facing veteran politicians Thomas Reilly and Chris Gabrielli in the Democratic primary. Patrick secured the nomination in the September primary, winning 49% of the vote in the three-way race. In the general election, Patrick faced Republican lieutenant governor Kerry Healey and Independent Massachusetts Turnpike Commission member Christy Mihos.

The general election was very heated, described by former governor Michael Dukakis as "the dirtiest gubernatorial campaign in my memory". Patrick faced criticism for having once written letters to the parole board describing correspondence from Benjamin LaGuer, a man convicted of a brutal eight-hour rape, as "thoughtful, insightful, eloquent, [and] humane".

Patrick contributed $5,000 towards the DNA testing which linked LaGuer to the crime. However, once the DNA test proved LaGuer's guilt, Patrick withdrew his support for the inmate's release. Patrick won the general election with 55% of the vote, becoming the first Democratic governor of Massachusetts since Michael Dukakis left office in 1991, and the state's first African-American governor.

==== 2010 ====
On April 2, 2009, Patrick announced alongside Lt. Governor Timothy Murray that they would both run for re-election.

Patrick was opposed for the Democratic nomination by Grace Ross, the 2006 Green-Rainbow nominee for governor, but she withdrew when she could not garner the number of signatures needed to run.

Patrick bucked the national trend in the mid-term election, defeating Republican challenger Charlie Baker with 48.4% of the vote. Baker received 42.0% and Tim Cahill, a former Democratic state treasurer running as an independent, took 8.0%. Nationally, Republicans gained a net of 63 seats to take control of the House, but remained a minority in the Senate despite gaining 6 seats.

=== Casino gaming ===
Patrick crafted and signed a bill that allows for the construction and operation of three resort-style casinos in the state. He argued that these casinos would generate over $2 billion for the state economy. He also touted that the casinos would create 30,000 construction jobs and 20,000 permanent jobs.

Patrick proposed that the revenue generated would be spent to beef up local law enforcement, create a state gambling regulatory agency, repair roads and bridges, and aid in gambling addiction treatment, and that the remainder would go towards property tax relief.

Patrick's casino plan had faced strong opposition from Salvatore DiMasi, the former Speaker of the Massachusetts House of Representatives. DiMasi questioned Patrick's projections of new jobs and revenues to be generated, and was opposed to what he referred to as a casino culture, saying: "Do we want to usher in a casino culture– with rampant bankruptcies, crime and social ills– or do we want to create a better Massachusetts for all sectors of the society?"

Casino gaming lobbying in Massachusetts has also received scrutiny for associations with the Jack Abramoff Indian lobbying scandal and efforts by the Mashpee Wampanoag Tribe to secure rights to a casino outside the legal framework of the federal Indian Gaming Regulatory Act. In 2009, Patrick was among the top campaign contribution recipients from casino lobbying interests, and from financiers backing the Wampanoag casino interests.

On March 20, 2008, the Massachusetts House of Representatives rejected Patrick's casino bill by a vote of 108 to 46. Despite the overwhelming vote, questions were raised by critics of DiMasi as to the tactics he used to win. These included allegations that he promised a subsequent vote on a bill that would allow slot machines at the state's four racetracks and the pre-vote promotions of six lawmakers who had been thought to support the bill, but either abstained or voted against the bill. DiMasi denied that any promise had been made on the race track bill and denied that the promotions were connected to the casino bill vote.

Patrick's conduct was also criticized and his commitment to the bill questioned when it was revealed that he was not in the state on the day the bill was voted on in the legislature. As the bill was being voted down, Patrick was in New York City on personal business, finalizing a $1.35-million deal with Broadway Books, an imprint of Random House, to publish his autobiography.

By mid-2010, the house and senate passed a bill with plans for three resort-style casinos and two slot parlors. However, Patrick vetoed it as he previously stated that he would only accept one slot parlor. When the 2011 casino legislation was still in debate, an investigative report in The Boston Globe revealed the governor violated his self-imposed policy of not accepting money from or meeting with lobbyists for the gambling industry, by accepting more than $6,000 in campaign contributions, and meeting with and attending fundraisers hosted by gaming lobbyists.

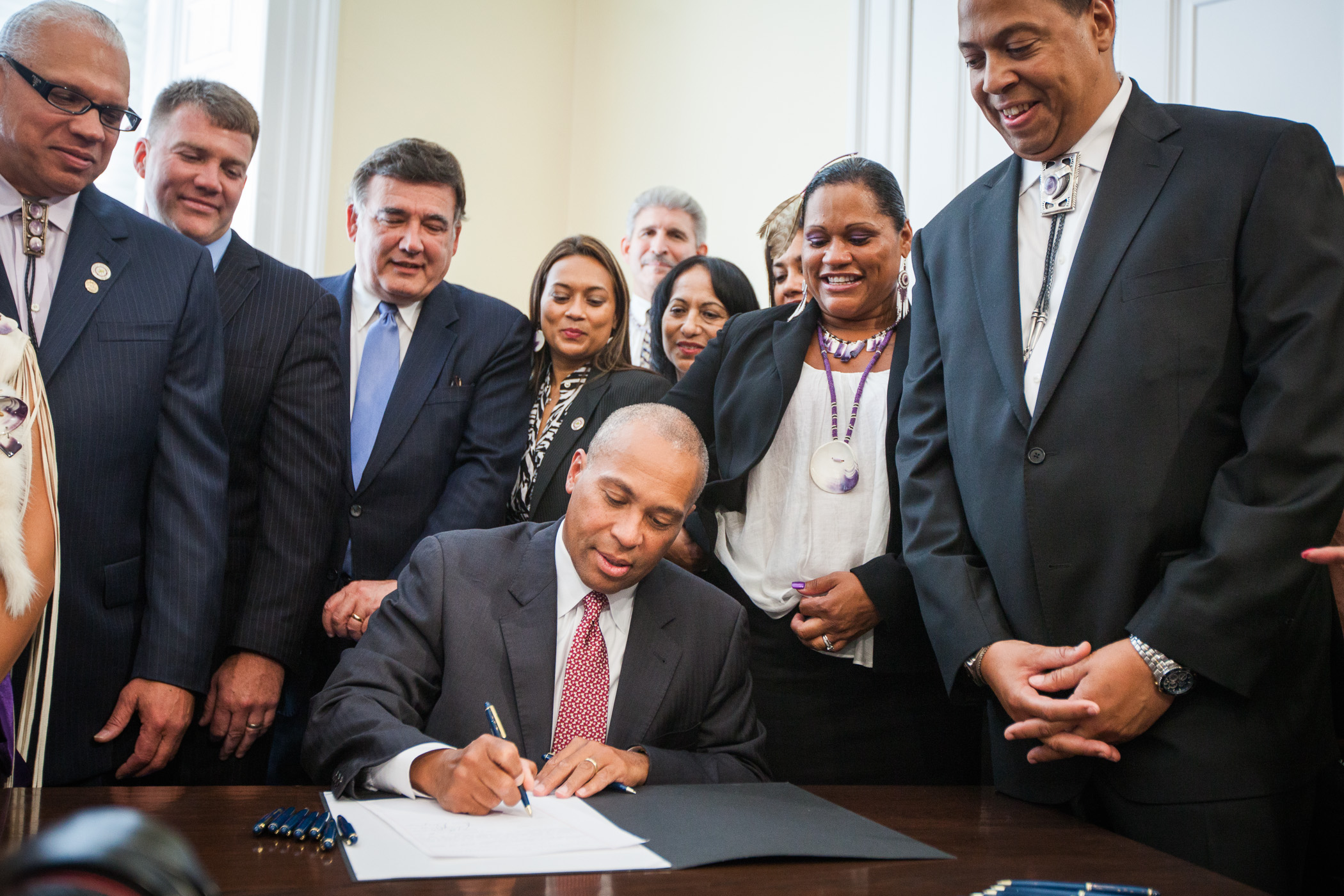
Patrick signing into legislation advancing a state compact with the Mashpee Wampanoag Tribe (July 2012)

Patrick signed the legislation into law in December 2011. Its implementation, however, has seen hurdles and delays. The governor's point man on crafting gaming legislation and negotiating a state compact with the Mashpee Wampanoag Tribe, Assistant Secretary for Policy & Economic Development Carl Stanley McGee, was forced to resign from his appointment to direct the newly formed Massachusetts Gaming Commission following reports of 2007 charges that he molested a child in Florida. Stan McGee was forced to return to his economic development post where he still oversees casino policies for the governor. The scandal resulted in the Massachusetts legislature passing a bill and overriding a veto by Patrick requiring background checks on casino regulators.

In June 2014, the Supreme Judicial Court ruled that a referendum to repeal legislation permitting casino gambling could appear on the November ballot, throwing the prospects of the casino legislation into question.

=== Gun control ===
In 2010, Patrick pushed for legislation to limit the purchase of firearms, citing a series of gun violence incidents and violent crime in Boston. In 2011, Patrick proposed new legislation that would require more stringent regulations on firearms. During an event surrounding the announcement, Patrick said one of his main goals was to "stop children from killing children." Patrick also reported that he would ask for $10 million in private and public funding to help "fill the gaps." Reacting to the Sandy Hook Elementary School shooting, in 2013 Patrick proposed stricter gun control laws, including a limit of one firearm purchase a month and closing the gun show loophole.

=== Education ===
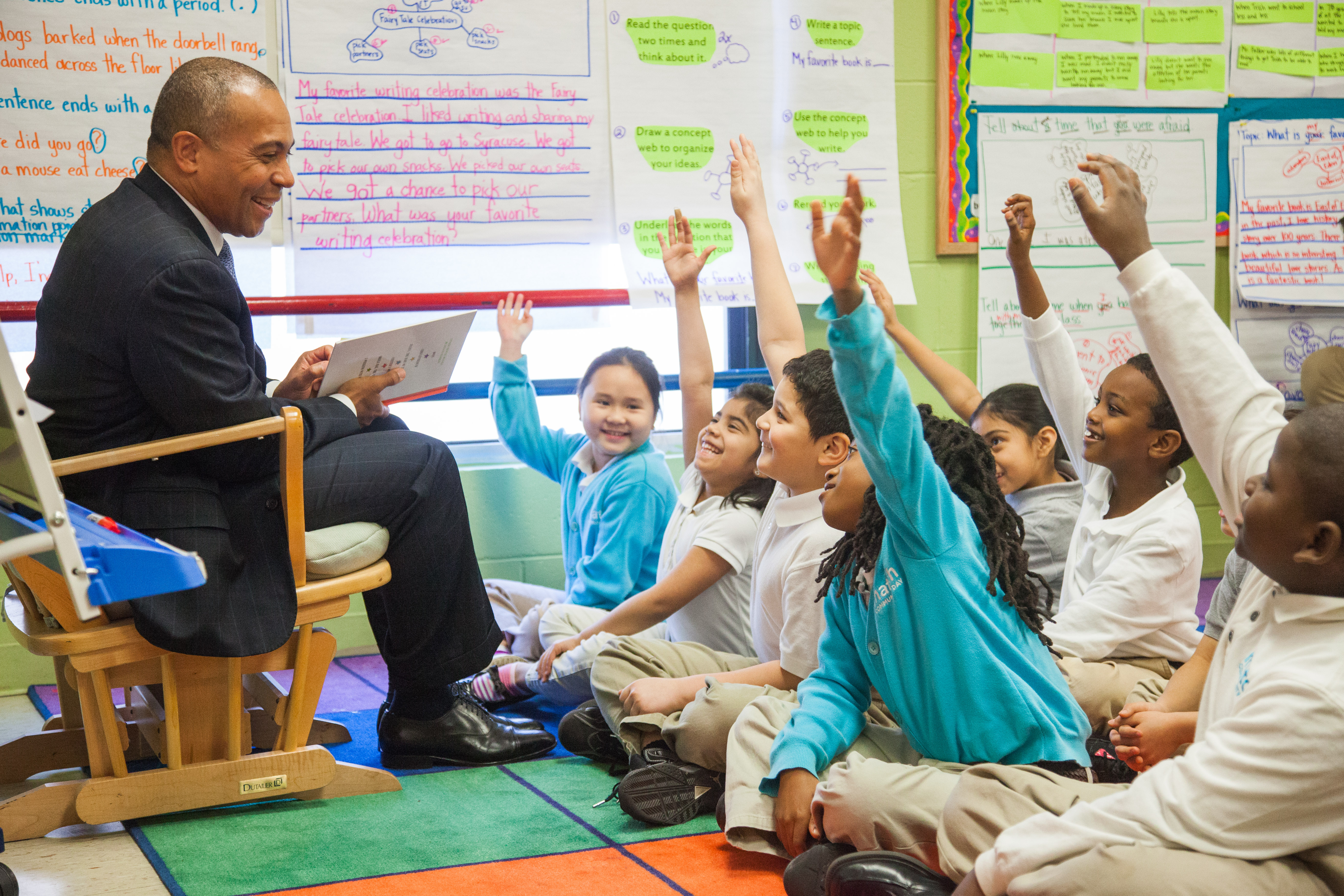
Patrick reading a book to schoolchildren in 2011

Throughout his term in office, Patrick made achieving "world-class public education" a main priority of his administration. Patrick also committed a historic amount of public funds to Massachusetts schools, introduced legislation to tackle a persistent education gap among minority students, and won the national Race to the Top competition. Patrick now supports a doubling of the number of charter schools in Massachusetts. In his first year in office, Patrick proposed making community college free to all Massachusetts high school graduates.

On August 7, 2008, Patrick signed a $2.2 billion higher education bond bill with $1 billion directed towards the University of Massachusetts system and $1.2 billion to the state universities and community colleges. $100 million was directed towards the construction of the integrated sciences complex at the University of Massachusetts Boston and a second $100 million directed towards constructing a general academic building. On October 23, 2014, Patrick spoke at the university in celebration of the science complex that would be completed the following January. On June 4, 2015, the university honored Patrick at the university's Golden Gala at the Boston Seaport World Trade Center and Patrick would return to the campus out of office on May 4, 2016, to meet with students from the university's new School for Global Inclusion and Social Development.

=== Same-sex marriage ===
As of 2005, Patrick favored the legalization of same-sex marriage because of the fundamental principle that "citizens come before their government as equals". He worked with the state legislature to prevent a ballot measure eliminating same-sex marriage in Massachusetts, which protected the state's first-in-the-nation same-sex marriage allowance.

=== Energy policy ===
Patrick proposed a bill that would streamline Massachusetts' permit appeals process for wind energy projects. The Wind Energy Siting Reform bill would reduce the permitting process to nine to 19 months.

Patrick made expanding renewable energy a focus of his second term, but faced a setback when lawmakers failed to raise caps on solar generation in Massachusetts and to expand the amount of hydropower purchased by utility companies from Canada.

=== Transportation ===
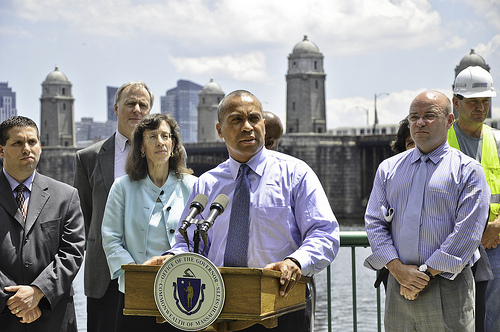
Patrick announcing the reconstruction of the Longfellow Bridge in June 2010

The legislatively chartered Transportation Finance Commission (TFC) reported in 2007 that over the next 20 years there would be $15–$19 billion gap between revenues and necessary expenditures, just to maintain the existing transportation system in Massachusetts. The Commission identified several reforms and revenue options to close the gap. The Patrick administration lobbied for and passed a major transportation reform bill, which incorporated many of the TFC-recommended reforms, and which created the Massachusetts Department of Transportation by merging smaller transportation agencies.

Patrick proposed raising the state gas tax by 19¢ per gallon to forestall Massachusetts Turnpike toll and MBTA fare increases, fully fund Regional Transit Authority and Turnpike operations, and address part of the capital shortfall identified by the TFC, but this was defeated in the state legislature. Instead, a sales tax increase of 1.25% was passed, with part of that dedicated to transportation. This was enough to prevent the short-term toll and fare increases, but did not address the long-term funding gap. Patrick has been a supporter of the South Coast Rail project.

=== Immigration ===
In response to the influx of children from Central America crossing the US border in the summer of 2014, Patrick proposed taking 1,000 migrants to be housed at various sites in Massachusetts, until they can be processed at immigration centers.

=== Senate appointments ===
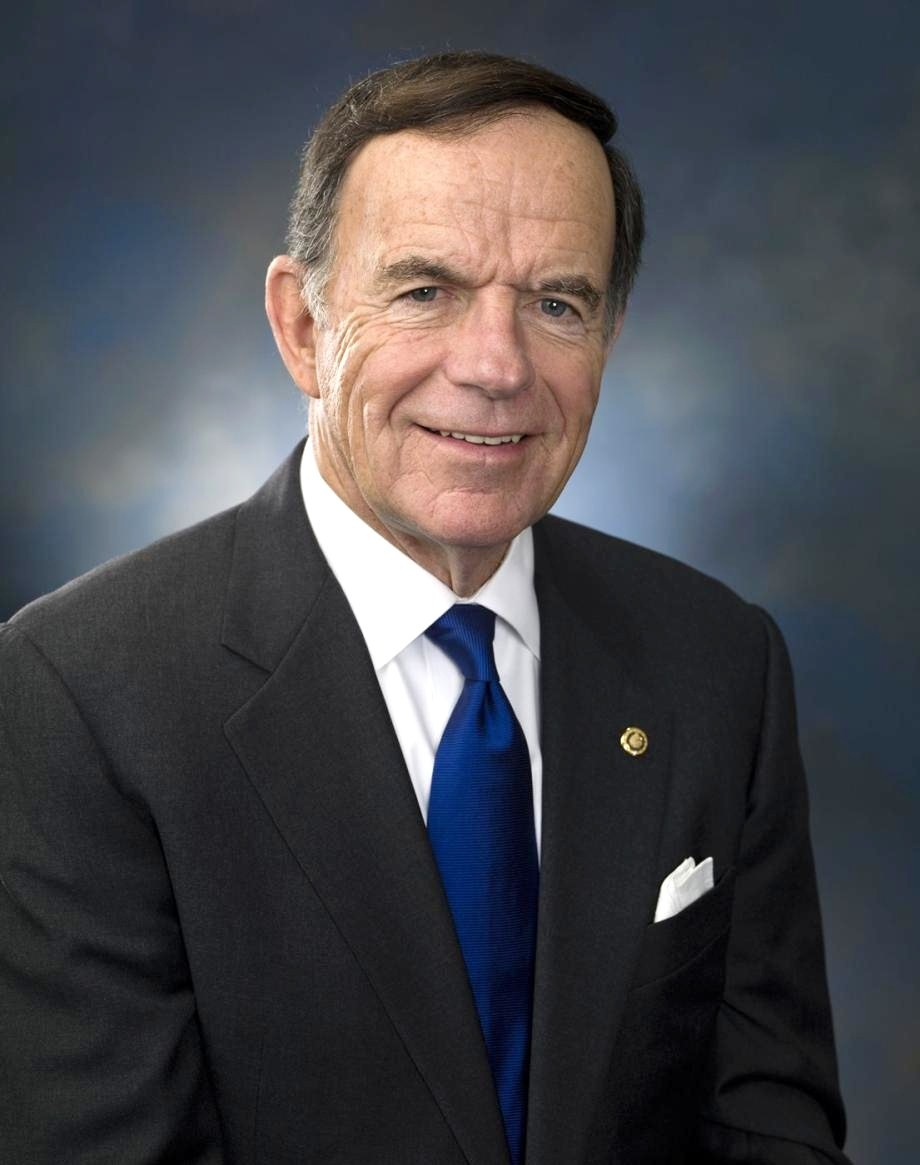
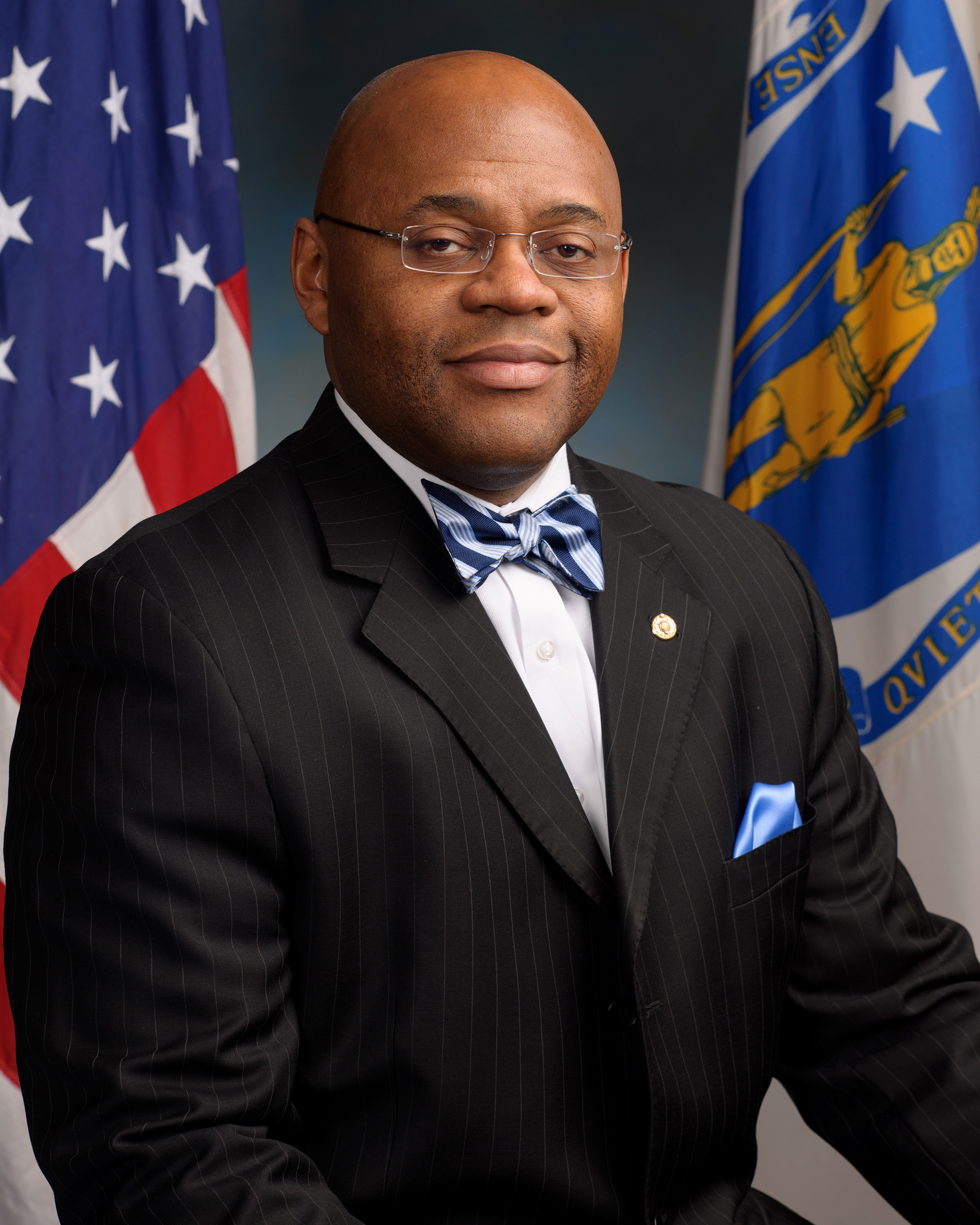
Left: Paul G. Kirk (D), Patrick's first Senate appointment.
Right: Mo Cowan (D), Patrick's second Senate appointment.

On September 24, 2009, Patrick appointed Paul G. Kirk as the interim U.S. senator in the wake of Ted Kennedy's death.

On January 30, 2013, Patrick chose his former chief-of-staff Mo Cowan to serve as interim U.S. senator until a special election to fill the seat left vacant by Secretary of State designate John Kerry.

=== Controversies ===
In the early months of Patrick's administration, a series of decisions the governor later conceded as "missteps" brought substantial unfavorable press. These included spending almost $11,000 on drapery for the governor's state house suite, changing the state's customary car lease from a Ford Crown Victoria to a Cadillac. Patrick responded in a February 20, 2007, press conference that "I realize I cannot in good conscience ask the agencies to make those choices without being willing to make them myself." Patrick subsequently reimbursed the Commonwealth for the cost of the drapery and furniture purchased for the statehouse, and the additional monthly difference in his car lease.

Later in the same month Patrick again came under fire, this time for contacting Citigroup Executive Committee chair and former Clinton Treasury Secretary Robert Rubin on behalf of the financially beleaguered mortgage company Ameriquest, a subsidiary of ACC Capital Holdings, that had been accused of predatory lending practices and of which Patrick is a former board member. Both Citigroup and ACC Capital Holdings have substantial holdings in Massachusetts. Patrick attempted to deflect criticism, claiming he was calling not as governor but as a private citizen. Later Patrick backed down, stating "I appreciate that I should not have made the call. I regret the mistake."

On September 17, 2014, Patrick fired the Massachusetts Sex Offender Registry Board chair Saundra Edwards and placed director Jeanne Holmes on paid administrative leave because they had pressured the board to force Bernard Sigh – Patrick's brother-in-law – to register as a sex offender. Sigh had pleaded guilty to raping his wife (Patrick's sister) in California in 1993 and neglected to register as a sex offender when he later moved to Massachusetts. Sigh assaulted his wife again in 2017; in June 2019 he was convicted of rape, stalking, kidnapping, and witness intimidation.

In June 2015, the Boston Herald reported that Patrick's administration secretly diverted nearly $27 million in government funds to off-budget accounts that paid for trade junkets tab, advertising contracts, and a deal with a federally subsidized tourism venture backed by U.S. Sen. Harry Reid. According to the Herald, state legislators never approved the funding, which began in 2009 when Patrick's office directed quasi-public state agencies, including the Massachusetts Convention Center Authority and Massport to begin funding off-budget trusts. A week later, the Boston Globe quoted Representative David Linsky, chair of the Massachusetts House of Representatives Post Audit and Oversight Committee, as saying that, upon review, the expenditures were either approved by the state legislature or permissible under the state's budget rules and that they violated no applicable law.

=== Healthcare ===
In 2014, Patrick signed a law requiring health insurers to extend coverage to people struggling with drug addiction by covering up to two weeks of inpatient treatment. The bill was seen in the broader context of state government battling the soaring opioid drug abuse rates, following a $20 million package introduced in June consisting of proposals targeting the problem. In the same year, Patrick signed a bill that would allow police to order anti-abortion protesters away from clinic entrances, if hindering public access.

=== NPVIC ===
On August 4, 2010, Patrick signed into law a bill adjoining Massachusetts to the National Popular Vote Interstate Compact.

=== Cabinet ===
The Patrick Cabinet
Office	Name	Term
Governor	Deval Patrick	2007–2015
Lieutenant Governor	Tim Murray	2007–2013
Secretaries of executive departments
Health and Human Services	JudyAnn Bigby	2007–2013
	John Polanowicz	2013–2015
Energy and Environmental Affairs	Ian Bowles	2007–2011
	Rick Sullivan	2011–2014
	Maeve Bartlett	2014–2015
Public Safety	Kevin M. Burke	2007–2010
	Mary Elizabeth Heffernan	2010–2013
	Andrea Cabral	2013–2015
Labor and Workforce Development	Suzanne Bump	2007–2010
	Joanne F. Goldstein	2010–2014
	Rachel Kaprielian	2014–2015
Transportation and Public Works (until 2009)	Bernard Cohen	2007–2009
	Jim Aloisi	2009
Department of Transportation (from 2009)	Jeffrey Mullan	2009–2011
	Richard A. Davey	2011–2015
Administration and Finance	Leslie Kirwan	2007–2009
	Jay Gonzalez	2009–2012
	Glen Shor	2013–2015
Education (created in 2008)	Paul Reville	2008–2013
	Matthew Malone	2013–2015
Housing and Economic Development	Dan O'Connell	2007–2009
	Greg Bialecki	2009–2015
Elder Affairs	Jennifer Davis Carey	2007
	Michael E. Festa	2007–2009
	Ann L. Hartstein	2009–2015
Veterans' Services	Thomas G. Kelley	2007–2011
	Coleman Nee	2011–2015
Special advisors
Education	Dana Mohler-Faria	2007–2008

=== Association with President Barack Obama ===
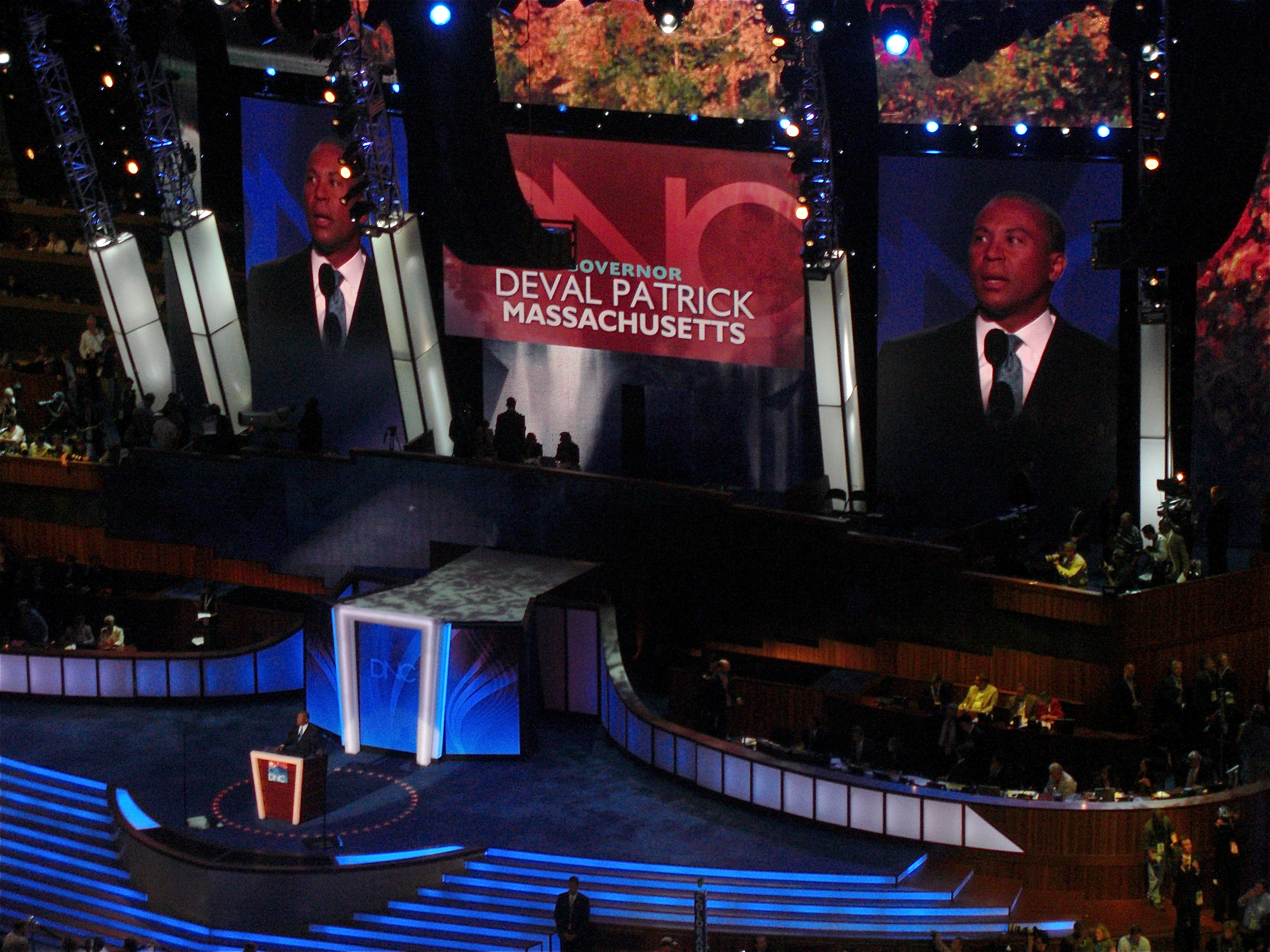
Patrick speaking at the 2008 Democratic National Convention

During the 2008 Democratic primaries, Patrick came to the defense of presidential candidate Barack Obama following plagiarism allegations that key phrases from an Obama stump speech were very similar to words used during Patrick's own 2006 gubernatorial run. The claims were largely dismissed after Patrick explained that he had encouraged their use.

After Obama's 2008 election as president, speculation arose that Patrick would be chosen by Obama to serve as United States attorney general, but the post ultimately went to Eric Holder.

During the 2012 presidential election, Patrick served as a surrogate for the Obama campaign. Patrick generated controversy when he took a position that directly opposed that of the campaign, defending the business practices of the Boston-based private equity firm Bain Capital, which was founded by Mitt Romney, the Republican presidential nominee.

Following the 2012 presidential election, Patrick was considered to be a potential successor to Holder, although Patrick had said he would not consider any other position as long as he remained governor. Speculation grew once again in September 2014, when Holder announced his intention to step down. The position was subsequently given to Loretta Lynch.

In March 2016, Patrick was named by USA Today as a possible Obama nominee to fill the U.S. Supreme Court associate justice seat, vacated by the February 2016 death of Antonin Scalia.

== Post-gubernatorial career ==
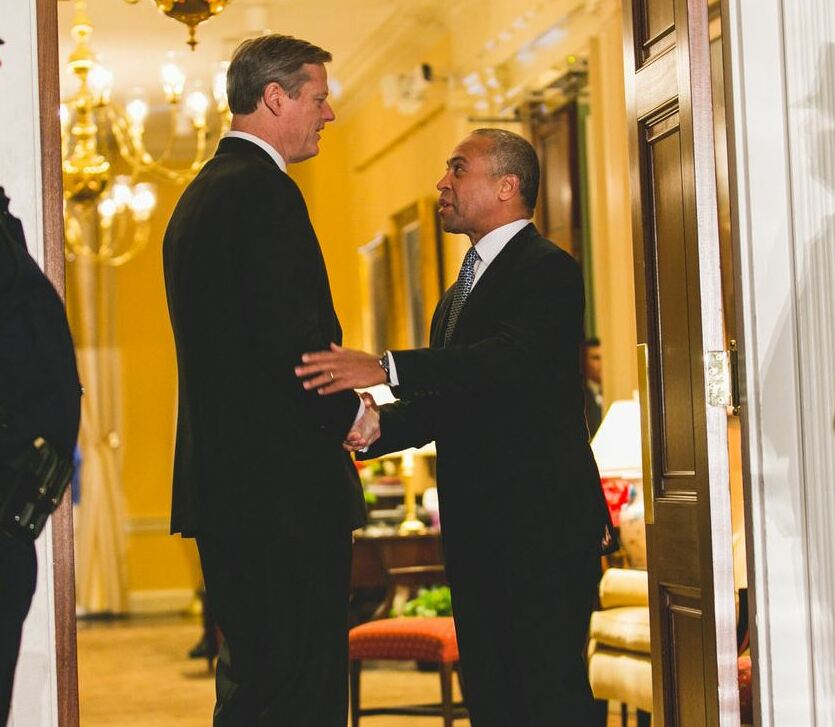
Patrick (right) with his gubernatorial successor, Charlie Baker, on the day of Baker's gubernatorial inauguration

=== Bain Capital and other private-sector work ===
Following his career as governor, Patrick joined the private equity firm Bain Capital in 2015 as a founding partner of the Bain Capital Double Impact Fund. He served as the fund's managing director from 2015 until November 2019, when he left Bain Capital and ran for president. He returned impact unit of Bain Capital in 2021 as an advisor.

As head of the fund, Patrick set a target of raising $250 million. Patrick announced in 2018 that the fund had raised $39 million. The fund then invested in relatively small companies. Patrick claimed that such businesses were focused on in order to, "generate both a private-equity-style return —a financial return— and measurable impact in one of three areas: sustainability, health and wellness, and what we’re describing as community building." The fund took the rare action of disclosing the impact scores it had internally assessed for each company it invested in, an unusually action of transparency among mainstream private equity firms.

Patrick also joined the board of directors of telehealth company American Well.

=== Nonprofit work ===
In November 2016, it was announced that Patrick had been appointed to the board of directors of the Obama Foundation. Patrick became the chairman of the board for Our Generation Speaks, a fellowship program and startup incubator whose mission is to bring together young Israeli and Palestinian leaders through entrepreneurship.

Patrick was involved in the Boston 2024 organization, which was in charge of Boston's bid for the 2024 Summer Olympics.

In April 2021, Patrick launched the Future of Tech Commission with Common Sense Media founder Jim Steyer and former Education Secretary Margaret Spellings. The commission's goal is to compile solutions for a comprehensive tech policy agenda under President Biden and Congress on topics as privacy, antitrust, digital dequity, and content moderation/platform accountability. In January 2022, Patrick became the co-director of the Harvard Kennedy School's Center for Public leadership. He also became a professor of the practice of public leadership and is currently a Hauser Leader at the school.

=== Senior advisor to the Chicago Police Accountability Task Force ===
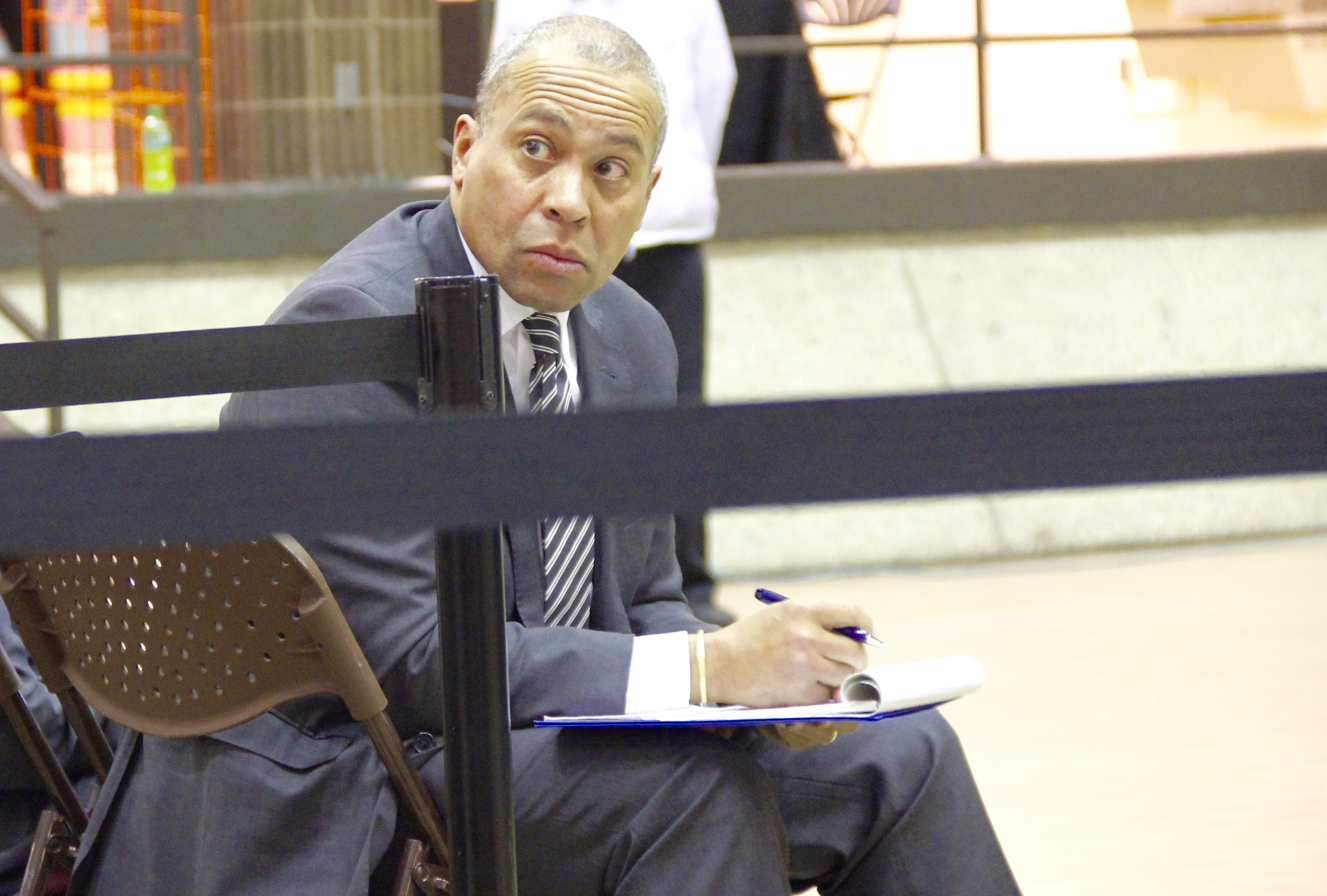
Patrick at a public meeting for the Chicago Police Accountability Task Force on February 23, 2016

At the start of December 2015, it was announced that Patrick had been selected by Chicago Mayor Rahm Emanuel to serve as senior advisor to the Chicago Police Accountability Task Force. The task force was established by Emanuel in the aftermath of the murder of Laquan McDonald at the hands of an on-duty police officer, and was tasked with reviewing accountability, oversight, and training within the Chicago Police Department. The task force completed its efforts in April 2016, with task force head Lori Lightfoot unveiling its final report at a press conference held on April 13.

=== Vistria Group ===
In 2024, Patrick joined The Vistria Group, a private investment firm that invests for both financial return and positive social impact, as a Senior Advisor. In this role, Patrick was tasked with leveraging his expertise across fundraising, deal sourcing, and portfolio performance to further The Vistria Group’s goals of achieving both strong financial returns and significant social impact. In November, Patrick was named as a Senior Partner and being tasked with a more active role on the leadership team and in shaping strategic direction for the firm.

=== 2020 presidential campaign ===
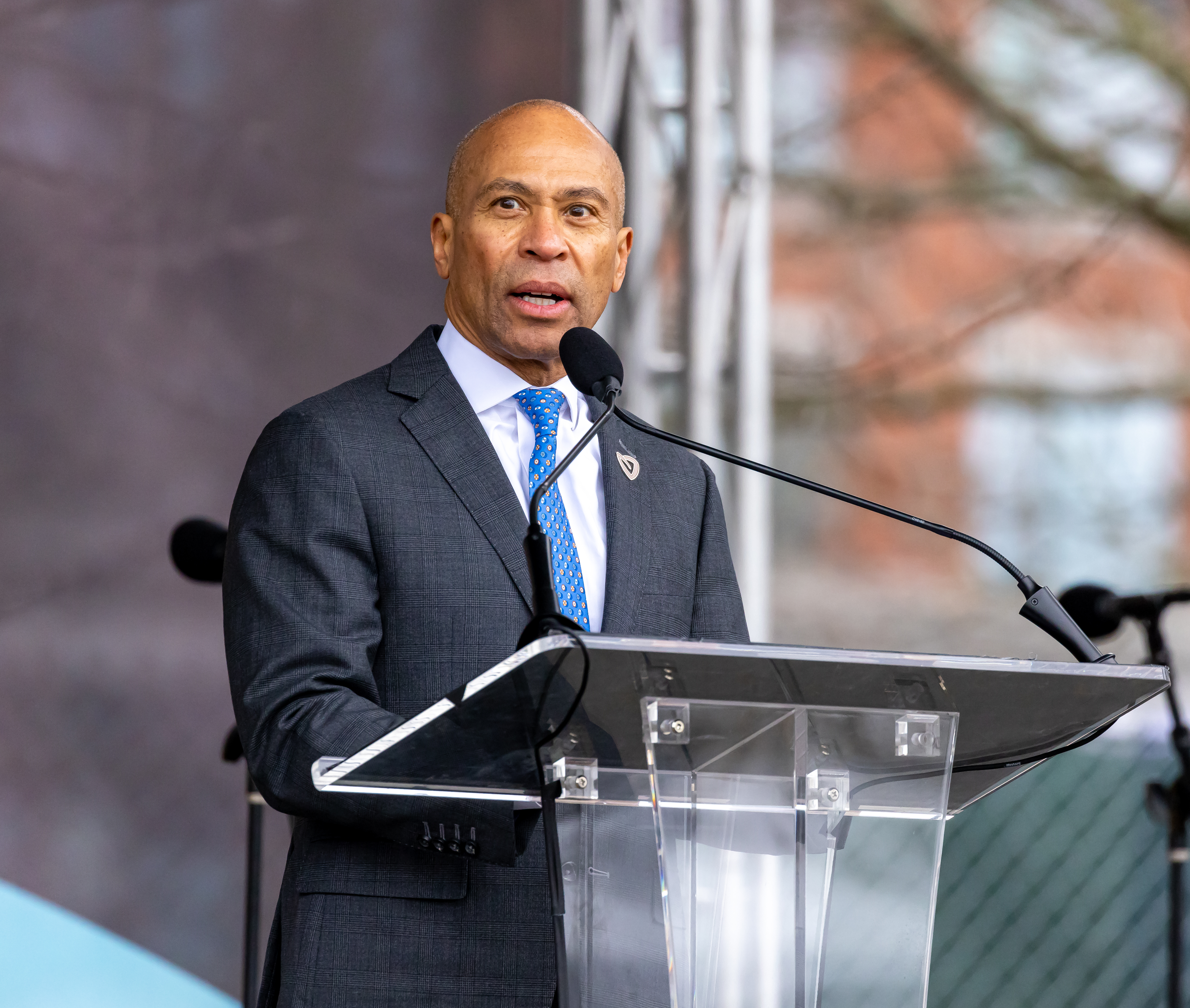
Patrick speaking at the January 2023 unveiling of Boston's The Embrace monument

Following Patrick's speech at the 2012 Democratic National Convention, a reporter asked if Patrick was interested in a 2016 presidential bid. He responded that he intended to return to the private sector after completing his second term as governor. In July 2013, Patrick unequivocally ruled out a 2016 presidential bid. Patrick, indeed, did not run for president in 2016.

On February 28, 2018, in response to reports that David Axelrod and Valerie Jarrett wanted him to run for president in 2020, Patrick stated on public radio that it was "on my radar screen". On December 6, 2018, he formally stated via Facebook that he would not be running for president in 2020, writing, "I’ve been overwhelmed by advice and encouragement from people from all over the country, known and unknown. Humbled, in fact. But knowing that the cruelty of our elections process would ultimately splash back on people whom Diane and I love, but who hadn't signed up for the journey, was more than I could ask."

On November 11, 2019, however, The New York Times reported that Patrick was considering making a late entry into the presidential race. Two days later, it was reported that he would file to run, beginning with New Hampshire. The next day, on November 14, Patrick officially announced that he would enter the 2020 Democratic Party presidential primaries. His campaign manager was Abe Rakov.

Patrick's second scheduled public event since announcing his candidacy, a speech at Morehouse College in Atlanta, Georgia on November 20, 2019, was cancelled when only two people showed up. The event, however, was scheduled with only twenty-four hours notice, and preceded the Democratic presidential primary debate that same night and only a few miles away.

Patrick's first campaign ads started January 8 in Iowa, New Hampshire, Nevada, and South Carolina. He spent $100,000 in ads in New Hampshire and $60,000 in South Carolina. Patrick generally polled under 1% in support among voters. For instance, despite a 29% approval rating in New Hampshire, he enjoyed support from only 1% of voters, according to a WBUR-FM poll; a November Quinnipiac poll in South Carolina produced similar results. Morning Consult reported that 46% of Democratic primary voters had never heard of him.

Patrick attempted to position himself as a politically-moderate choice. He opposed Medicare for All, instead supporting the addition of a public option to the existing Affordable Care Act. Describing his economic philosophy as a candidate, Patrick once declared, "I’m a capitalist. I’m not a market fundamentalist. I don’t think private markets in the private sector solves every problem that needs to be solved in our society right on time."

Following a poor showing in the New Hampshire primary on February 12, 2020, Patrick suspended his campaign.

=== Further political activity ===
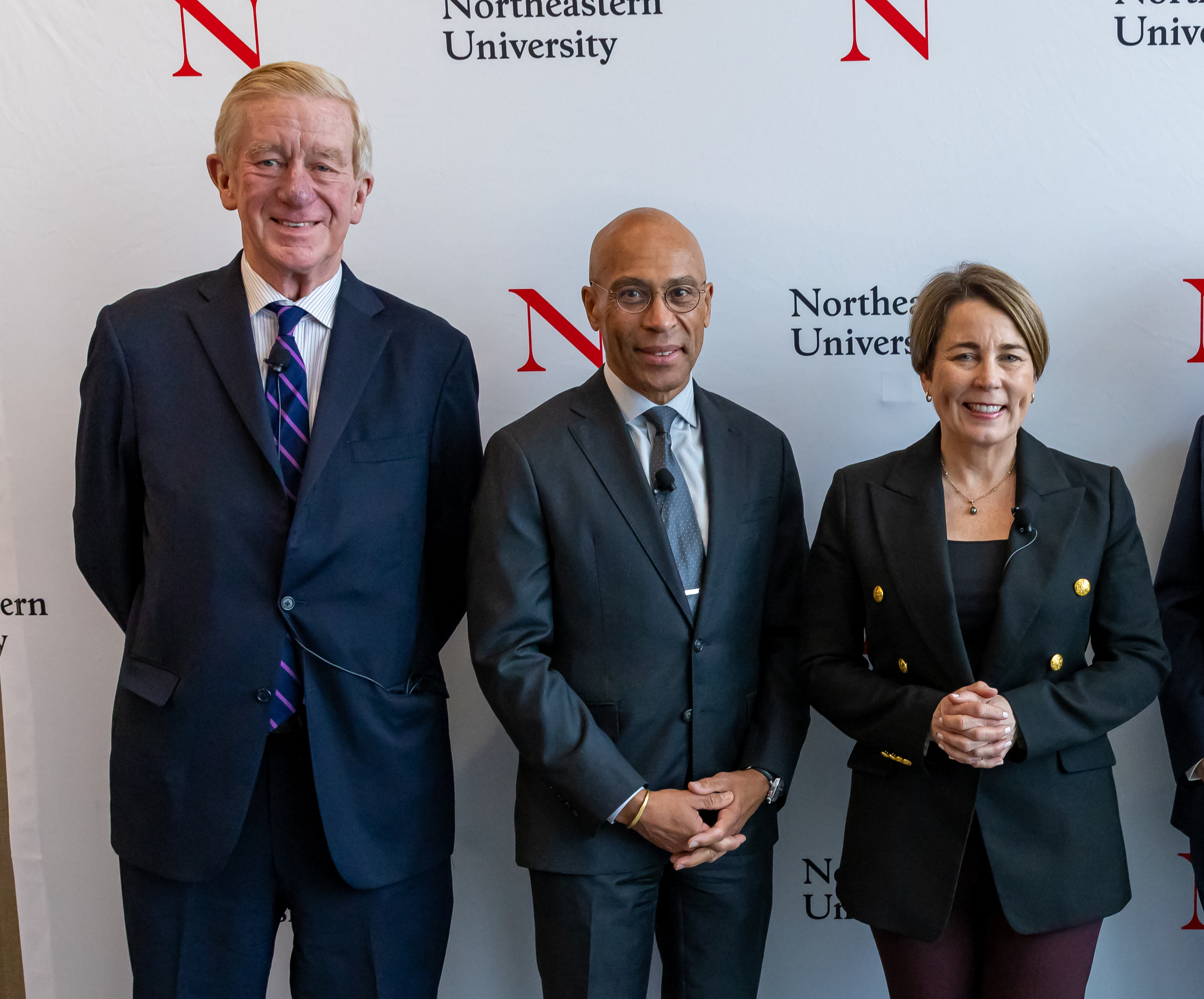
Patrick (center) in 2024 with Massachusetts governor Maura Healey (right) and former Massachusetts governor Bill Weld (left)

In May 2020, Patrick announced that he had launched TogetherFundPAC, a super PAC in support of Joe Biden, the presumptive Democratic presidential nominee.

On July 6, 2024, during an interview with CNN, Patrick said he would stand by President Joe Biden. But if he steps down, he would be open to running.

== Electoral history ==
Democratic gubernatorial primary 2006
Party	Candidate	Votes	%	±%
Democratic	Deval Patrick	452,229	49.57%	
Democratic	Chris Gabrieli	248,301	27.22%	
Democratic	Tom Reilly	211,031	23.13%	

Massachusetts gubernatorial election 2006
Party	Candidate	Votes	%	±%
Democratic	Deval Patrick	1,234,984	55.6	+10.66
Republican	Kerry Healey	784,342	35.3	−14.47
Independent	Christy Mihos	154,628	6.9	+6.2

Massachusetts gubernatorial election 2010
Party	Candidate	Votes	%	±%
Democratic	Deval Patrick	1,112,283	48.42	–7.21
Republican	Charlie Baker	964,866	42.00	+6.67
Independent	Tim Cahill	184,395	8.03	+1.06

== Personal life ==
Patrick and his wife, Diane Patrick, a lawyer specializing in labor and employment law, married in 1984. They have lived in Milton, Massachusetts, since 1989 and have two daughters, Sarah and Katherine. In July 2008, Katherine publicly announced that she is lesbian, and mentioned that her father did not know this while he was fighting against a proposed amendment to the state constitution that would have banned same-sex marriage. In a joint interview Patrick expressed support for his daughter and said he was proud of her. In September 2011, his daughter Sarah married Marco Morgese, a former Italian soldier. On May 20, 2013, Patrick became a grandfather when Sarah gave birth to a son, Gianluca Noah Patrick Morgese.

In addition to his Milton home, Patrick and his family own a home in Richmond, Massachusetts.

In 2013, Illinois governor Pat Quinn renamed a part of Wabash Avenue in Chicago, where Patrick grew up, "Deval Patrick Way" in his honor. On May 28, 2015, Patrick was awarded an honorary Doctor of Laws by Harvard University.

== See also ==
- Barack Obama Supreme Court candidates
- List of minority governors and lieutenant governors in the United States

Party political offices
Preceded by Shannon O'Brien	Democratic nominee for Governor of Massachusetts; 2006, 2010	Succeeded by Martha Coakley
Political offices
Preceded by Mitt Romney	Governor of Massachusetts; 2007–2015	Succeeded by Charlie Baker
U.S. order of precedence (ceremonial)
Preceded by Bill Weld as Former Governor	Order of precedence of the United States	Succeeded by Charlie Baker as Former Governor
