= Andrea Silbert =

American nonprofit executive

- Born: 1963/1964 (age 61–62)
- Education: Harvard University
- Known for: Gender equity advocacy
- Political party: Democratic
- Children: 3

Andrea Silbert (born 1963/1964) is an American nonprofit executive specialized in gender equity and poverty issues. She has served as the first president of the Eos Foundation since 2007. Silbert cofounded the Center for Women & Enterprise nonprofit in 1995 and served as its chief executive officer until 2004.

== Education and career ==
Silbert was born in 1963 or 1964 and is from Harwich, Massachusetts. She earned a B.A. in economics from Harvard College. Following graduation, she worked as a financial analyst at Morgan Stanley for two years. In 1988, she worked at a business school in Costa Rica writing case studies and conducting industry research. She also worked with Women's World Banking in Costa Rica, Colombia, and Brazil. Silbert attended Harvard Business School and the Harvard Kennedy School, graduating with a M.B.A. and M.P.A. in 1992.

For two years, Silbert worked with Women's World Banking in Brazil that helped prostitutes and women living in poverty. In 1995, she cofounded Center for Women & Enterprise, a nonprofit agency with a goal of helping women in business. Starting with three employees and donated space at Northeastern University, the center had twenty-five employees and over one-hundred volunteers by 2004. On May 1, 2004, she resigned as its chief executive officer and was succeeded by Donna Good. Silbert was a Democratic candidate in the 2006 Massachusetts lieutenant governor election, losing in the primaries to Tim Murray. She ran on a socially progressive platform focused on job creation. In 2007, she became the first president of the Eos Foundation. For nine years, the foundation was primarily focused on reducing poverty in Greater Boston. In 2015, she expanded the foundation's mission to improve gender equity in business and higher education.

== Personal life ==
Silbert is married to a graphic designer and artist. They have three children.
