= Grace Ross =

American activist

- Born: June 6, 1961 (age 64)
- Occupation: Political activist

Grace Ross (born June 6, 1961) is an American activist in Massachusetts. Ross was a Democratic candidate for Governor of Massachusetts in 2010 until she withdrew from the race, citing a lack of signatures. Ross is also a former Green-Rainbow Party co-chair and was the 2006 Green-Rainbow Party nominee for Governor. She is from Worcester, Massachusetts.

== Biography ==
Ross grew up in New York City before coming to Massachusetts to attend Harvard University, where she obtained a BA in psychology and a master's degree in education. Afterwards, she became involved in the low-income community, and her primary activist work has been to address issues related to abolishing poverty. She has also worked on other causes from nonviolence, the environment, and international solidarity to anti-racist struggles, women's rights, union organizing and gay/lesbian civil rights.

In 2006 Ross became the first open lesbian to run for the post of Governor of Massachusetts. Ross lost to Deval Patrick, receiving 43,193 votes for 1.95% of the total vote.

In December 2006, Ross was named "Person of the Year" by the New England gay-oriented magazine, IN News Weekly.

Ross was an at-large candidate for the Worcester City Council in 2007. She received 6,629 votes, placing eighth out of twelve in the November election in which the top six vote-getters were elected.

In 2008, Ross helped found the Massachusetts Alliance Against Predatory Lending, a coalition of over 30 community organizations, housing counseling agencies, legal services groups and others who have come together to work on the sub-prime foreclosure crisis in Massachusetts. She is also active in the Worcester Anti-Foreclosure Team (WAFT).

In 2010, Ross failed to secure enough signatures to challenge the incumbent Governor Deval Patrick in the Democratic primary.

== Political views ==
Ross, as a member of the Green-Rainbow Party, holds the following political views:

- Opposes MCAS testing: "MCAS is a big part of why kids drop out of high school".
- Supports "constitutional commitment to education—35 kids is too many".
- Supports free education.
- Supports decrease of global warming.
- Believes that agriculture deserves more economic development attention.
- Supports "voting rights for people, not monied interests".
- Supports bringing Massachusetts troops home from foreign war zones.
- Opposes tax rollbacks on the grounds they lead to property tax increases and disproportionately benefit the rich.
- Supports progressive taxation.
- Supports living wages and a guaranteed income for all.
- Calls for a "secular, democratic governing entity for all people in the geographic region of historic Palestine (today referred to by some people as Israel, the West Bank and Gaza)."
- Opposes any military intervention in Sudan by the US, the UN, or imposed by any other foreign power. Opposes the imposition of sanctions on the Sudanese government.
