= Christy Mihos =

American politician and businessman

Member of the Massachusetts Turnpike Commission
- In office July 1, 1999 – July 1, 2004
- Succeeded by: Daniel Grabauskas

Personal details
- Born: June 13, 1949 Brockton, Massachusetts, U.S.
- Died: March 25, 2017 (aged 67) Stuart, Florida, U.S.
- Party: Republican
- Other political affiliations: Independent (2006)
- Spouse: Andrea Mihos (m. 1974; div. 2013)
- Education: Stonehill College
- Occupation: Businessman

Christy Peter Mihos (June 13, 1949 – March 25, 2017) was an American politician and businessman from Massachusetts. He first rose to prominence as the owner of a chain of convenience stores across New England. was an Independent candidate for governor of Massachusetts in 2006. He ran for the Republican nomination for governor in 2010, but did not receive enough votes at the Republican Convention to qualify for the primary ballot.

== Early life ==
Mihos was born and raised in Brockton, Massachusetts. During his youth, Mihos worked in his family's supermarket. He graduated from Brockton High School and Stonehill College. While attending college, Mihos was the part of a Greek wedding band playing the bouzouki, clarinet, and saxophone. He was also part of a rock band playing the bass guitar.

In 1974, Mihos and his wife Andrea married. During the 1980s he was president of the board of stewards at the Panagia Greek Orthodox Church in Cohasset, Massachusetts. He was credited with leading the church through one of its most successful financial periods. During his tenure, the church's interior was refurbished and a parish house was purchased.

== Business career ==
Mihos owned the convenience store chain Christy's Markets on Cape Cod. The original store, which was in Brockton, Massachusetts, was opened by his Greek immigrant grandfather, Christy Mihos, in 1934. During the 1960s, Mihos father and uncle, Peter and James C. Mihos, expanded the business from a single supermarket into a chain of convenience stores.

In the 1970s, Mihos began running the chain with his brother, Jim. Christy served as president and chief executive officer, while Jim was the company's chief operating officer and treasurer. In 1980 they purchased the Sunny Corner Farms chain of convenience stores, which gave the business 33 stores in the Boston area. At its peak, the chain included 144 stores found throughout Massachusetts, Rhode Island, and Maine. In May 1998, Mihos and his brother sold 142 of their stores to 7-Eleven. Mihos, however, repurchased eight Christy's on Cape Cod along with some real estate holdings.

== Political career ==
=== 1990 state senate election ===
In 1990, Mihos ran for the Massachusetts Senate as a Republican. He was initially the frontrunner for the party's nomination, as he had more name recognition and financial means than his opponents and had lived in three of the towns in the district (Cohasset, Weymouth and Scituate). Although Mihos was seen as the most electable Republican in a district that included heavily Democratic towns such as Weymouth and Marshfield, his support for environmental protection and abortion rights, willingness to raise taxes, and contributions to prominent Democrats such as William M. Bulger and William B. Golden caused some Republicans to view him as too liberal. Mihos lost the primary election by three votes to conservative activist Robert Hedlund, who later won the general election.

=== Massachusetts Turnpike Authority ===
In 1999, he was appointed to the Massachusetts Turnpike Authority by Governor Paul Cellucci, where he served as vice chairman. During his tenure on the Authority, Mihos frequently clashed with Chairman Matt Amorello over a number of issues regarding the Big Dig's budget and excessive spending. In 2001, after voting to postpone a toll hike and seeking to fire Bechtel, the general contractor of the Big Dig, Mihos was fired by Acting Governor Jane Swift, along with Director Jordan Levy. Mihos sued claiming that the governor did not have the authority to fire them, and it was eventually brought before the Massachusetts Supreme Judicial Court. Mihos won his case, and both were reinstated to the Authority. Mihos later sued Governor Swift for violating his First Amendment right to free speech and settled that case in U.S. District Court for $197,000.

In 2004, when Mihos's five-year term on the authority expired, Governor Mitt Romney replaced him with Daniel A. Grabauskas, the 2002 Republican nominee for State Treasurer. During his term on the Authority, Mihos also served as a trustee of the University of Massachusetts.

=== 2006 campaign for governor ===
In late 2005, Mihos announced that he was thinking of running for governor in 2006. After Romney announced that he would not seek re-election, Mihos decided to pursue his candidacy further. Lieutenant Governor Kerry Healey had won the support of Romney and the majority of the state Republican leadership for the nomination, so Mihos decided to run as an independent, announcing his candidacy for governor via televised interview on March 2, 2006. The next day, he held a rally at the Massachusetts State House to officially announce his candidacy. An article published on March 21 in The Boston Globe drew attention to Mihos's interactions with public university professor Lou DiNatale. DiNatale had involvement in Mihos political campaign, including poll analysis, despite the fact that DiNatale was never employed by Mihos, and the state education system prohibited its educators from being involved in political campaigns. The Globe wrote that DiNatale had "an unusual relationship with Christy P. Mihos, now an independent candidate for governor."

On June 8, Mihos announced that he had chosen John J. Sullivan, a Winchester, Massachusetts town moderator and lifelong Democrat, to be his running mate. In September, Mihos generated controversy by airing an animated political commercial, which showed a Big Dig engineer and politicians with their heads literally up their behinds.

A centerpiece for Mihos's platform in his run for governor was what he called "Proposition 1," a plan to dedicate 40% of the state's budget to aid for the cities, end annual reassessment of property taxes (similar to California's Proposition 13), and eliminate fees for public education. He declared that he believes in traditional marriage between a man and a woman, but the personal lives of Massachusetts residents should be left private, and a vote on same-sex marriage is an issue for the voting public, not one man. In addition, he had pledged to enact campaign finance reform laws. In the November 7 general election, Mihos only garnered approximately 7% of the vote, with Healy at 35% and Democratic candidate Deval Patrick at nearly 56%.

=== 2010 campaign for Governor ===
On July 1, 2008, Mihos announced his intention to launch a 2010 gubernatorial bid. Mihos was advised by Dick Morris, a former adviser and strategist for former US President Bill Clinton. On April 17, 2010, balloting at the Massachusetts Republican State Convention resulted in Charlie Baker beating Mihos by a margin of 89% to 11%; since Mihos received less than 15%, he was denied a spot on the GOP ballot in a possible primary. Mihos told reporters that he did not plan to run for office again.

== Financial difficulties ==
In 2010, gas suppliers sued Mihos for over $600,000 and a judge placed liens on several of his business properties. Around the same time, former campaign staffers filed claims with the state alleging unpaid wages. Later that year, Mihos was fined $70,000 by the state Office of Campaign and Political Finance for improper campaign spending. In 2011 Massachusetts Attorney General Martha Coakley sued him for failing to pay the fine.

In December 2011, a judgment of $123,000 was entered against Mihos in a lawsuit brought by Citgo.

In July 2012 he was ordered to pay Independence Park Inc., a Hyannis-based developer, $910,000 as well as more than $10,000 in attorney fees and other costs.

== Divorce ==
On February 21, 2012, Andrea Mihos went to the Yarmouth, Massachusetts, police station to report an alleged domestic assault the previous evening in Stuart, Florida. She told police she was concerned for her husband's mental health, as his behavior had become increasingly erratic and aggressive due to political and business setbacks. According to the police report, the assault occurred during an argument in which she reminded her husband of his bad behavior, including hiring prostitutes, strippers, and porn stars for sex. Police declined to pursue domestic violence charges against Mihos, stating that there was not enough evidence and that his wife was not cooperating.

In May 2012, Andrea Mihos filed for divorce, which she was granted on October 15, 2013. The judge ruled that she would receive the majority of the couple's remaining assets ($2.9 million of the couple's $4 million estate). He described Christy Mihos' actions as "deceptive, ego-driven, impulsive and rash, and ended up being financially devastating".

On June 27, 2012, Mihos was charged with assault and battery for an incident that occurred between him and his wife in July 2011 at their home in West Yarmouth, Massachusetts.

In April 2014, he reached an agreement with prosecutors in which the charges would be dropped if he successfully completed nine months of pretrial probation, refrained from contacting Andrea Mihos except through e-mail or their attorneys, completed a mental health evaluation and underwent any necessary treatment, and refrain from publicly commenting on the case unless with Andrea Mihos and/or her attorney.

== Death ==
In 2017, four weeks after complaining of stomach pain, Mihos died of pancreatic cancer. At the time of the diagnosis, doctors told him the cancer had spread to his bladder and liver. Due to the advanced stage of his cancer, he declined further treatment, and entered hospice care. He died in Stuart, Florida, on March 25, 2017, at the age of 67.
