= 2006 Massachusetts gubernatorial election =

- November 7, 2006
- Turnout: 56.23% ▲0.94
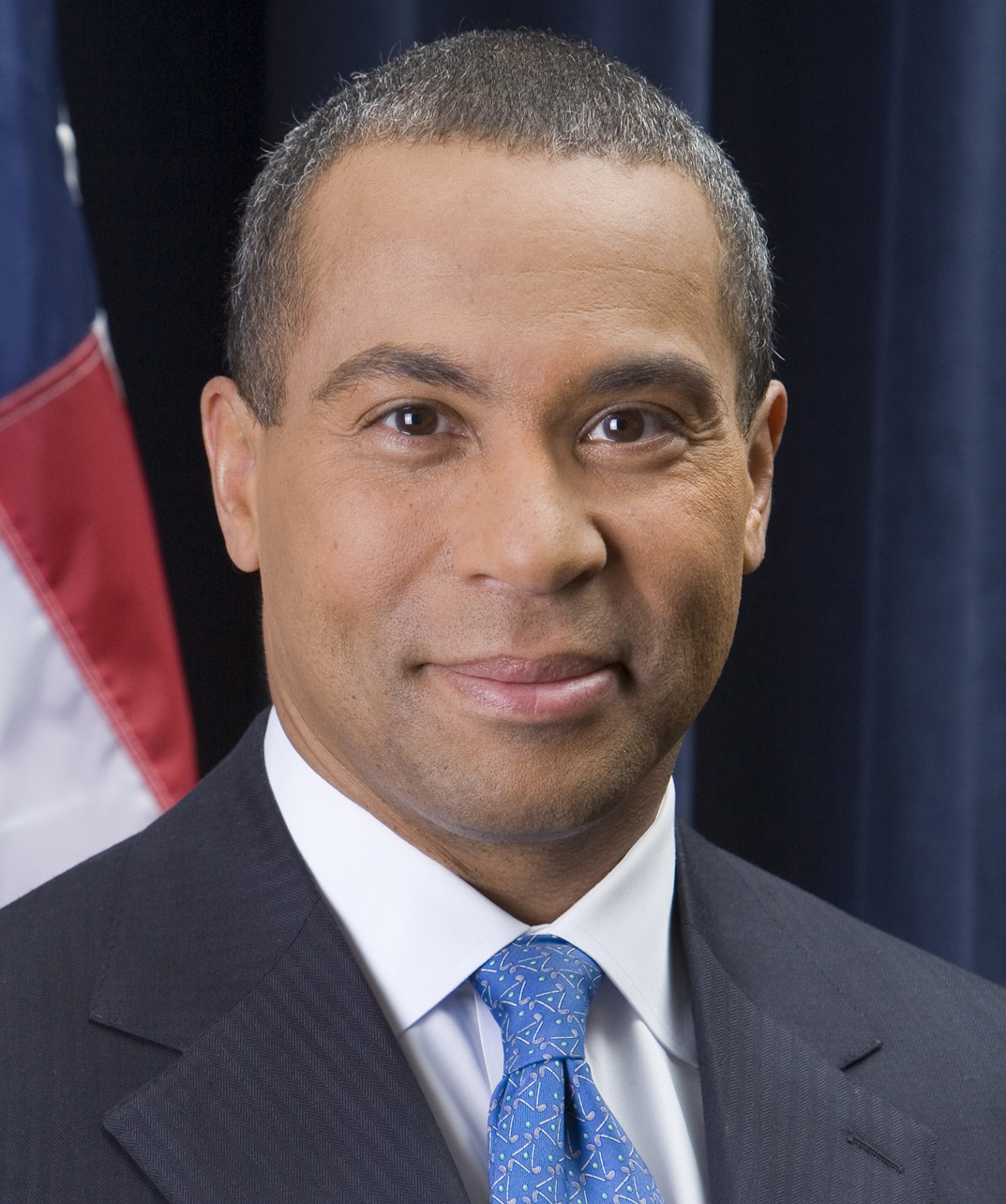

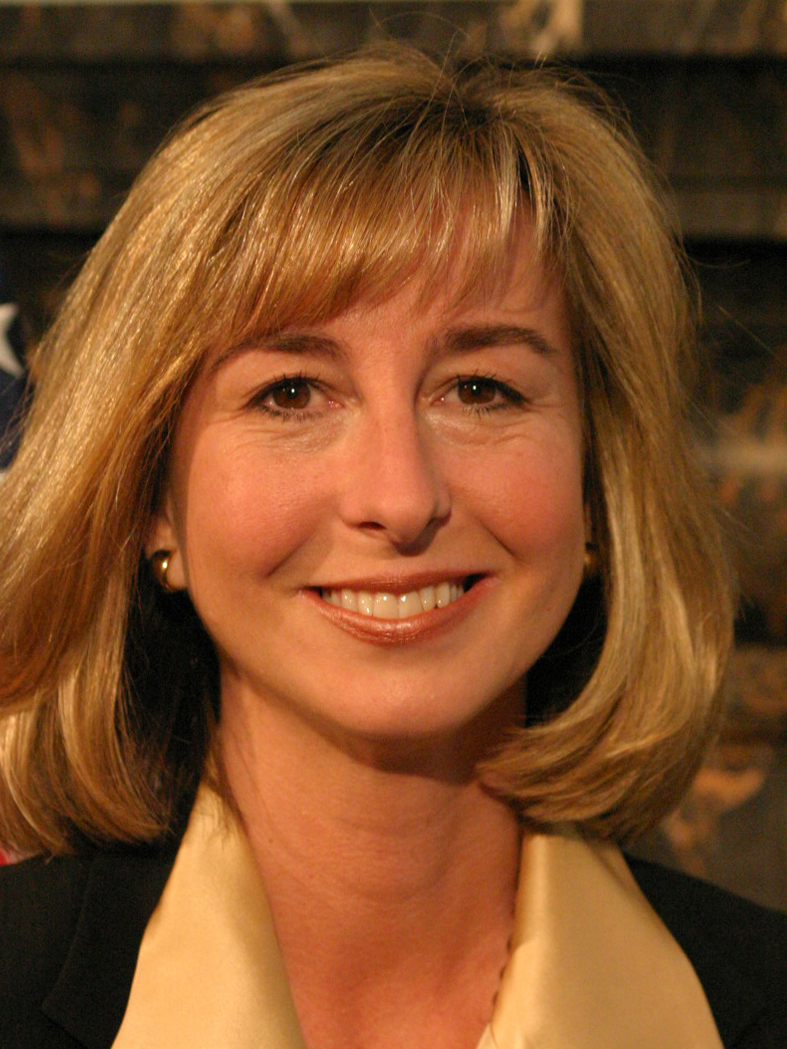

Nominee	Deval Patrick	Kerry Healey	Christy Mihos
Party	Democratic	Republican	Independent
Running mate	Tim Murray	Reed V. Hillman	John J. Sullivan
Popular vote	1,234,984	784,342	154,628
Percentage	55.03%	34.95%	6.89%
- Patrick: 40–50% 50–60% 60–70% 70–80% 80–90% >90% Healey: 40–50% 50–60% Tie: 40–50%
Governor before election
Mitt Romney
Republican
Elected Governor
Deval Patrick
Democratic

The 2006 Massachusetts gubernatorial election was held on November 7, 2006. The incumbent Republican governor, Mitt Romney, chose not to seek a second term. Polls had been mixed prior to Romney's announcement, with one poll showing Romney slightly leading Democratic Attorney General Tom Reilly and other polls showing Reilly, who was then the Democratic frontrunner, in the lead.

The election was won by the Democratic former United States Assistant Attorney General Deval Patrick, who became the second African-American governor in the United States since Reconstruction and the first Democratic governor of Massachusetts since Michael Dukakis left office in 1991. This was the last time until 2022 that the Democratic nominee won a majority. Healey is the only Republican gubernatorial nominee never to be elected governor between 1990 and 2018.

== Republican primary ==
=== Governor ===
==== Candidates ====
- Kerry Healey, lieutenant governor of Massachusetts

===== Declined =====
- Christy Mihos, businessman (running as an independent)
- Mitt Romney, incumbent governor (endorsed Healey)

Healey was unopposed for the Republican nomination.

=== Lieutenant governor ===
==== Candidates ====
- Reed Hillman, former state representative and Massachusetts State Police colonel

As incumbent Kerry Healey ran for governor, the position of lieutenant governor was open. Reed Hillman was unopposed for the Republican nomination.

== Democratic primary ==
=== Governor ===
==== Candidates ====
- Chris Gabrieli, businessman and lieutenant governor nominee in 2002
- Deval Patrick, former assistant U.S. attorney general for Civil Rights
- Thomas Reilly, Massachusetts attorney general

==== Endorsements ====
- Deval Patrick: Attleboro Sun Chronicle, Bay State Banner, Blue Mass Group, Boston Globe, Brookline Tab, Cambridge Chronicle, Hamilton-Wenham Chronicle, Wellesley Townsman, Worcester Magazine
- Tom Reilly: Boston Herald, Cape Cod Times, Springfield Republican

==== Campaign ====
The Democratic state caucuses were held in February in all cities and towns to elect delegates to the state convention. The Patrick campaign organized their supporters, many of whom had never been involved in such party processes before, to win twice as many pledged delegates as the Reilly campaign. (Chris Gabrieli did not join the race until a month later, which played a major role in his difficulty in getting on the ballot.)

At the Democratic Convention on June 3 in Worcester, each candidate needed to receive support from 15% of the delegates to be on the primary ballot in September. There was some question as to whether Gabrieli could succeed after entering the race so late. Patrick received the convention's endorsement with 57.98% of the vote, Reilly made it with 26.66%, and Gabrieli narrowly achieved ballot access with 15.36% of the delegates' votes.

The campaign was highlighted by numerous debates. The first two debates took place in late April. WBZ-CBS4 News hosted a debate between Democratic candidates Chris Gabrieli, Deval Patrick, and Tom Reilly on April 21 and it aired at 8:30 AM on April 23. A second Democratic candidate debate, moderated by Sy Becker from WWLP TV 22, was held at Agawam Middle School on April 27.

The "Campaign to Stop Killer Coke", a group dedicated to holding Coca-Cola accountable for violence in its Colombian bottling plant in the mid-1990s, began to attack Patrick and his candidacy. Patrick had resigned from the company and said he'd done so after his attempts to get them to carry out an independent investigation were ignored and undermined. Five Massachusetts unions filed a complaint against the group with the Office of Campaign and Political Finance, in an effort to require the group to disclose its donors. On August 11, it was reported that Reilly's campaign had been behind the efforts.

The final two televised debates played a key role in the primary campaign, as they took place during the two weeks between Labor Day and Primary Day when the public and the media hold their greatest focus on the election. The first of the two was carried about by the media consortium (which includes the Boston Globe, NECN, and WBUR, among others) and moderated by former New Hampshire governor Jeanne Shaheen, while the second and final debate was held by WBZ-TV and moderated by their political analyst, Jon Keller.

==== Polling ====
Poll source	Date(s)	Sample size	Margin of error	Deval Patrick	Thomas Reilly	Chris Gabrieli	Other / undecided (Note: Calculated by taking the difference of 100% and all other candidates combined.)
Rasmussen Reports	January 15–18, 2006	[data missing]	±5%	30%	29%	–	41%
State House News	January 25–27, 2006	[data missing]	±7.1%	18%	58%	–	23%
Suffolk University	February 2–4, 2006	[data missing]	±4.9%	30%	39%	–	31%
UMass Lowell	February 16, 2006	[data missing]	±5%	40%	40%	–	20%
Survey USA	March 5–6, 2006	[data missing]	±5%	37%	47%	–	17%
Boston Globe	March 12, 2006	[data missing]	±4.9%	22%	35%	4%	39%
Merrimack College	February 25–March 8, 2006	[data missing]	±4.8%	21.8%	37.5%	–	40.7%
Suffolk University	April 3, 2006	[data missing]	±4.9%	21%	32%	11%	36%
Survey USA	April 7–8, 2006	[data missing]	±4.8%	36%	33%	19%	11%
Suffolk University	May 3, 2006	[data missing]	±4.9%	20%	35%	15%	29%
Survey USA	May 1–3, 2006	[data missing]	±4.9%	28%	32%	29%	10%
State House News	May 3–5, 2006	[data missing]	±6.8%	15%	37%	25%	22%
June 3 – Patrick receives party endorsement at Democratic State Convention
Survey USA	June 16–18, 2006	[data missing]	±4.8%	36%	31%	23%	9%
Suffolk University	June 22–26, 2006	[data missing]	±4.0%	31%	25%	22%	21%
State House News	June 28–30, 2006	[data missing]	±7.0%	34.8%	19.3%	21.8%	23%
Survey USA	July 9–11, 2006	[data missing]	±4.9%	37%	26%	27%	10%
Survey USA	July 31–August 2, 2006	[data missing]	±4.6%	35%	27%	30%	8%
Suffolk University	August 17–21, 2006	[data missing]	±5.2%	24%	20%	32%	24%
Survey USA	August 19–21, 2006	[data missing]	±4.8%	34%	30%	30%	6%
Boston Globe	August 18–23, 2006	[data missing]	±4.4%	30%	24%	27%	18%
Boston Globe	(including "leaners")	[data missing]	±4.4%	31%	27%	30%	4%
State House News	September 7–10, 2006	[data missing]	±6.8%	35.6%	19.4%	25.6%	17.2%
Survey USA	September 9–11, 2006	[data missing]	±4.1%	45%	21%	29%	4%
Boston Globe	September 12–15, 2006	[data missing]	±4.4%	46%	18%	25%	10%
Suffolk University	September 15–17, 2006	[data missing]	±4.0%	37%	21%	29%	11%
Survey USA	September 15–17, 2006	[data missing]	±3.8%	46%	22%	29%	3%

==== Results ====
Results by municipality: Patrick: 30–40%; 40–50%; 50–60%; 60–70%; 70–80%; 80–90%; 90–100%; Gabrieli: 30–40%; 40–50%; Reilly: 30–40%; 40–50%

Results by precinct: Patrick: 40–50%; 50–60%; 60–70%; 70–80%; 80–90%; >90%; Gabrieli: 30–40%; 40–50%; 50–60%; 60–70%; Reilly: 30–40%; 40–50%; 50–60%; 60–70%; Tie No data/no votes

On September 19, Patrick won the Democratic primary with 50% of the vote, ahead of Gabrieli (27%) and Reilly (23%).

Massachusetts Democratic gubernatorial primary, 2006
Party	Candidate	Votes	%
Democratic	Deval Patrick	452,229	49.57%
Democratic	Chris Gabrieli	248,301	27.22%
Democratic	Tom Reilly	211,031	23.13%
Write-in	All others	787	0.08%
Write-in	Blanks	14,054	1.51%
Total votes		926,402	100%

=== Lieutenant governor ===
==== Candidates ====
- Deb Goldberg, former chair of the Brookline Board of Selectmen
- Tim Murray, mayor of Worcester
- Andrea Silbert, businesswoman

===== Withdrew =====
- Sam Kelley, MD, child, adolescent, and adult psychiatrist; medical director of the Massachusetts Society for the Prevention of Cruelty to Children; and former legislative aide to US Congressman Jim McDermott
- Marie St. Fleur, state representative from Dorchester

===== Declined =====
- Chris Gabrieli (running for governor)

==== Campaign ====
On April 23, 2006, a "virtual debate" between Murray, Silbert, and Sam Kelley was released on SaintKermit.com.

On May 21, all four candidates debated in Lowell. Four days later, on May 25, Kelley dropped out of the race and joined the Deval Patrick campaign as a volunteer advisor on health care issues.

At the Democratic convention in Worcester on June 3, Worcester Mayor Tim Murray was endorsed by a voice vote after receiving 49% on the first ballot. Andrea Silbert and Deb Goldberg both qualified for the ballot with 29% and 22% respectively.

==== Endorsements ====
- Deborah Goldberg: Boston Herald
- Tim Murray: Boston Globe, Worcester Telegram & Gazette
- Andrea Silbert: Blue Mass Group, Brookline Tab

==== Polling ====
Source	Date	MoE	Goldberg	Murray	Silbert	Undecided
Suffolk University	June 22–26, 2006	±4.0%	10%	6%	5%	79%
Suffolk University	August 19–21, 2006	±5.2%	6%	11%	5%	77%
State House News	September 7–10, 2006	±6.8%	18.3%	15.2%	10.0%	53.4%
Boston Globe	September 12–15, 2006	±4.4%	26%	20%	18%	27%
Suffolk University	September 15–17, 2006	±4.0%	35%	22%	21%	31%

==== Results ====
Tim Murray won the Democratic nomination for lieutenant governor on September 19 with 43% of the vote.

Massachusetts Democratic lieutenant gubernatorial primary, 2006
Party	Candidate	Votes	%
Democratic	Tim Murray	351,009	42.60%
Democratic	Deborah Goldberg	279,771	33.95%
Democratic	Andrea Silbert	191,638	23.26%
Write-in	All others	1,591	0.19%
Write-in	Blanks	102,393	11.00%
Total votes		926,402	100%

== General election ==
=== Candidates ===
- Kerry Healey, lieutenant governor of Massachusetts (Republican)
  - Running mate: Reed Hillman, former state representative and Massachusetts State Police colonel
- Christy Mihos, businessman and former member of the Massachusetts Turnpike Authority (Independent)

- Running mate: John Sullivan, former Winchester selectman

- Deval Patrick, former assistant U.S. attorney general for Civil Rights (Democratic)
  - Running mate: Tim Murray, mayor of Worcester
- Grace Ross, anti-poverty and LGBT activist (Green-Rainbow)

- Running mate: Wendy Van Horne, nurse (withdrew September 1)
- Running mate: Martina Robinson, disability rights activist

=== Campaign ===
On April 25, Republican Kerry Healey called for four debates, each involving all four candidates, between the September primaries and November general election, and this proposition was seconded by Patrick.

The general election campaign kicked off on primary day, September 19, after Tom Reilly and Chris Gabrieli conceded and Kerry Healey accepted her uncontested nomination. Deval Patrick followed with his acceptance speech, appearing with his new running mate Tim Murray and former opponent Chris Gabrieli.

The general election campaign was very heated and was referred to by Michael Dukakis as "the dirtiest gubernatorial campaign in my memory". The Healey campaign released attack ads implying that Deval Patrick supports sexual assault or murder of police (culminating in the now infamous "parking lot rape" ad). Healey supporters also protested at the homes of Patrick and Patrick campaign manager John E. Walsh, and documents leaked anonymously to media about Patrick's brother-in-law's criminal history.

After the final debate, WRKO talk radio host John DePetro came under scrutiny for referring to Grace Ross as a "fat lesbian". DePetro had been suspended earlier in the year for calling Turnpike Authority chief Matt Amorello a "fag".

=== Debates ===
The first televised debate of the general election was held by WFXT and the Boston Herald on September 25 on WFXT. Moderated by Fox News' Chris Wallace on the day after his Bill Clinton interview.

The second debate was held in Springfield and broadcast on WGBH and NECN.

=== Endorsements ===
- Kerry Healey: Boston Herald, Springfield Republican, The Eagle-Tribune, Sentinel & Enterprise, Lowell Sun, Cape Cod Times
- Christy Mihos: Walpole Gazette
- Deval Patrick: The Boston Globe, Worcester Telegram & Gazette, MetroWest Daily News, Providence Journal, The Berkshire Eagle, Boston Phoenix, Newton Tab, West Roxbury & Roslindale Transcript
- Grace Ross: In City Times

=== Predictions ===
Source	Ranking	As of
The Cook Political Report	Lean D (flip)	November 6, 2006
Sabato's Crystal Ball	Likely D (flip)	November 6, 2006
Rothenberg Political Report	Likely D (flip)	November 2, 2006
Real Clear Politics	Likely D (flip)	November 6, 2006

=== Polling ===
View source data.

Poll	Date	MoE	Patrick (D)	Healey (R)	Mihos (I)	Ross (GR)	Und/Other
State House News	November 17–20, 2005	±4.8%	44%	32%			24%
Suffolk University	February 6, 2006	±4.9%	39%	32%			29%
UMass Lowell	February 16, 2006	±5%	34%	34%	12%		20%
UMass Lowell	February 16, 2006	±5%	40%	38%			22%
Survey USA	March 3–5, 2006	±3.8%	30%	35%	20%		14%
Boston Globe	March 3–9, 2006	±4.4%	36%	29%	13%		22%
Boston Globe	March 3–9, 2006	±4.4%	44%	38%			18%
Merrimack College	February 25–March 8, 2006	±5.6%	32.0%	28.0%	13.0%		27.0%
Merrimack College	February 25–March 8, 2006	±4.8%	34.5%	39.4%			26.1%
Rasmussen	March 13, 2006	±4.5%	38%	25%	17%		20%
Suffolk University	March 18–20, 2006	±4.9%	29%	26%	13%		32%
State House News	March 16–18, 2006	±4.8%	25%	32%	18%		25%
Zogby/WSJ	March 30, 2006	±3.5%	53%	31.5%			
Suffolk University	April 3, 2006	±4.9%	29%	24%	9%	1%	38%
Rasmussen	April 14, 2006	±4.5%	34%	27%	19%		20%
Suffolk University	May 3, 2006	±4.9%	26%	28%	10%	4%	33%
State House News	May 5, 2006	±4.8%	29%	31%	15%		17%
Survey USA	May 8, 2006	±4.4%	34%	32%	17%		17%
Rasmussen	May 15, 2006	±4.5%	36%	26%	16%		22%
June 3 – Patrick receives party endorsement at Democratic State Convention
Zogby/WSJ	June 21, 2006	±3.5%	55.7%	33.7%			10.6%
Suffolk University	June 22–26, 2006	±4.0%	38%	25%	10%	1%	26%
State House News	June 28–30, 2006	±5.0%	40.1%	30.5%	9.3%	1.7%	18.4%
Rasmussen	June 27, 2006	±4.5%	43%	23%	15%		19%
Zogby/WSJ	July 24, 2006	±4.2%	57.4%	30.8%			11.8%
Rasmussen	August 12, 2006	±4.5%	39%	29%	14%		18%
Zogby/WSJ	August 15–21, 2006	±3.8%	49.6%	23.9%			26.5%
Suffolk University	August 17–21, 2006	±4.1%	38%	30%	10%	2%	20%
State House News	September 7–10, 2006	±4.7%	43%	30%	7%	1%	19%
Zogby/WSJ	September 11, 2006	±3.9%	57.5%	33.0%			9.5%
September 19 – Primary election night; start of campaign
Survey USA	September 19–21, 2006	±3.9%	64%	25%	5%	1%	5%
Rasmussen	September 20, 2006	±4.5%	57%	24%	9%		10%
Merrimack College	September 20–24, 2006	±4.5%	54.2%	20.9%	5.3%	0.5%	19.1%
Zogby/WSJ	September 25, 2006	±3.9%	58.7%	27.3%	8.3%		5.7%
Boston Globe/WBZ	September 26–29, 2006	±4.3%	55%	30%	7%	1%	7%
Suffolk University	October 2–4, 2006	±4.5%	49%	28%	6%	1%	16%
Survey USA	October 8–10, 2006	±4%	52%	34%	9%	1%	4%
Suffolk University	October 10–11, 2006	±4.9%	46%	33%	7%	1%	12%
Zogby/WSJ	October 10–16, 2006	±3.6%	56%	33.6%	6.4%		4%
Suffolk University	October 20–23, 2006	±4.9%	53%	26%	9%	2%	11%
Survey USA	October 21–23, 2006	±4%	56%	31%	8%	2%	4%
UNH/Boston Globe	October 22–25, 2006	±4.1%	54%	29%	8%	2%	6%
Zogby/WSJ	October 23–27, 2006	±3.7%	58.1%	32.7%	4%		
SurveyUSA/WBZ	October 31–November 1, 2006	±3.9%	55%	34%	6%	3%	
State House News	November 1–2, 2006	±5%	50.9%	27.1%	8.0%	2.1%	6.7%
Suffolk University	November 2–5, 2006	±4.9%	53%	31%	6%	2%	9%

=== Results ===

2006 Massachusetts gubernatorial election
Party	Candidate	Votes	%	±%
Democratic	Deval Patrick	1,234,984	55.03%	▲10.63
Republican	Kerry Healey	784,342	34.95%	▼14.23
Independent	Christy Mihos	154,628	6.89%	▲6.27
Green-Rainbow	Grace Ross	43,193	1.92%	▼1.54
Write-in	All others	2,632	0.12%	▲0.06
Total votes		2,219,779		
	Blank	24,056		
Turnout		2,243,835	56.23%	
Majority		450,642	20.08%	
Democratic gain from Republican		Swing	▲24.86	

=== Results by county ===
2006 United States gubernatorial election in Massachusetts (by county)
County	Patrick - D %	Patrick - D #	Healey - R %	Healey - R #	Mihos- I %	Mihos- I #	Others %	Others #	Total #
Barnstable	45.7%	47,713	43.1%	44,986	8.7%	9,029	2.5%	2,567	104,295
Berkshire	76.0%	35,035	20.2%	9,339	2.6%	1,218	1.1%	527	46,119
Bristol	57.3%	95,623	34.3%	57,233	6.8%	11,379	1.6%	2,546	166,781
Dukes	63.2%	4,817	28.1%	2,143	5.5%	420	3.2%	240	7,620
Essex	51.1%	131,376	39.9%	102,584	6.9%	17,686	2.1%	5,372	257,028
Franklin	70.8%	20,204	21.8%	6,212	5.1%	1,446	2.4%	691	28,553
Hampden	55.3%	74,899	35.8%	48,511	7.1%	9,664	1.7%	2,265	135,339
Hampshire	67.3%	38,025	25.2%	14,232	5.3%	2,999	2.2%	1,204	56,460
Middlesex	56.2%	299,749	34.8%	185,738	6.6%	35,267	2.3%	12,483	533,239
Nantucket	56.2%	2,244	35.1%	1,402	6.8%	270	2.0%	78	3,994
Norfolk	52.1%	134,916	38.6%	99,995	7.3%	18,879	2.0%	5,250	259,050
Plymouth	46.4%	84,296	41.2%	74,933	10.5%	19,063	1.9%	3,366	181,658
Suffolk	70.4%	126,242	23.1%	41,316	4.4%	7,841	2.1%	3,834	179,233
Worcester	53.7%	139,845	36.8%	95,718	7.5%	19,467	2.1%	5,380	260,410

Counties that flipped from Republican to Democratic

- Barnstable (largest municipality: Barnstable)
- Essex (largest municipality: Lynn)
- Hampden (largest municipality: Springfield)
- Middlesex (largest municipality: Cambridge)
- Nantucket
- Norfolk (largest municipality: Quincy)
- Plymouth (largest municipality: Brockton)
- Worcester (largest municipality: Worcester)

== See also ==
- 2005–2006 Massachusetts legislature
- 2006 United States gubernatorial elections
- 2006 United States House of Representatives elections
- 2006 United States Senate elections
