= Our Generation Speaks =

U.S.-based non-profit organization

- Founded: 2014; 12 years ago
- Founder: Ohad Elhelo
- Founded at: Waltham, Massachusetts
- Type: Non-profit organization
- Headquarters: Waltham, Massachusetts
- Website: www.ogspeaks.com

Our Generation Speaks (OGS) is a fellowship program and startup incubator whose mission is to bring together young Israeli and Palestinian leaders through entrepreneurship. OGS works in partnership with the Heller School for Social Policy and Management (Brandeis University) and MassChallenge to give OGS Fellows the tools to develop businesses that generate significant social and economic value in the Middle East.

== Structure ==
OGS teaches business development, financial management, marketing strategy, and conflict-resolution to young adults aged 21–30. The fellowship runs over the course of three months in Waltham, Massachusetts, and includes daily classes taught by Brandeis University professors, one-on-one mentoring, and workshops. During the summer, the fellows work in teams to build sustainable businesses that will benefit their home communities. The fellowship operates entirely in English. Each business developed through OGS receives seed funding at the end of the fellowship to aid in their launch and operations upon return to Israel and Palestine.

OGS aims to maintain a 1:1 ratio of Israeli and Palestinians, as well as female and male fellows.

== History ==
Our Generation Speaks was founded by Brandeis University student Ohad Elhelo in 2014. Since its founding, OGS has received financial support and advising from over fifty independent American, Palestinian, and Israeli donors who share its goals and values, including the Kraft Family (the Kraft Group), former Governor of Massachusetts Deval Patrick, Hani Alami, a Palestinian telecommunications entrepreneur, and Aron Ain, chief executive of Kronos Incorporated. Former Governor Deval Patrick currently serves as the Chairman of the OGS Advisory Board, alongside Robert Kraft who serves as Honorary Chairman.

Our Generatiin Speaks has since launched three startups in Jerusalem and Ramallah as of September 2016, and expects to launch at least three to four each year. Each OGS startup receives seed funding from OGS to establish themselves in Israel and Palestine. Some of the startups have also raised funds independently of OGS.

== See also ==
- Projects working for peace among Arabs and Israelis
