= Green-Rainbow Party =

Massachusetts political party

- Founded: 2002
- Membership (2026): ▼3,210
- Ideology: Green politics
- Political position: Left-wing
- National affiliation: Green Party of the United States
- Colors: Green
- Seats in the Upper House: 0 / 40
- Seats in the Lower House: 0 / 160

Website
- www.green-rainbow.org

The Green-Rainbow Party (GRP) is the Massachusetts affiliate of the Green Party of the United States and a political designation in Massachusetts officially recognized by the Secretary of the Commonwealth of Massachusetts. Up until 2020, it was an officially recognized political party in Massachusetts, losing that status as the result of vote tallies in the November 2020 election.

Originally the Massachusetts Green Party, it was formed in 1996 and recognized in 2000. It merged with the Rainbow Coalition Party in 2002 and rebranded as the Green-Rainbow Party. The GRP has supported Green Party presidential candidates such as Ralph Nader, David Cobb, Cynthia McKinney, Jill Stein and Howie Hawkins. It has also run candidates and pushed for political support at the state and municipal level. As of 2021, there were 9 Green-Rainbow Party elected office holders and a number of other appointed office holder in Massachusetts. As of October 15, 2018, the official party's membership ranks stood at 4,314 members.

== Political ideology ==
Like most North American Green parties, the basis of the Green-Rainbow Party's platform stems from the 10 key values. The 10 key values are: grassroots democracy, ecological wisdom, social justice and equal opportunity, nonviolence, decentralization, community-based economics, feminism, respect for diversity, personal and global responsibility, and future focus and sustainability.

=== Causes and initiatives ===
For some years, the party was involved in co-organizing an annual March to Abolish Poverty. Like many small parties that view the Democratic and Republican parties as creating difficult ballot access laws, the party has also pushed for electoral reforms, particularly ranked choice voting and publicly financed campaigns. The party also champions universal health care and strongly supported marriage equality, long before the Massachusetts Supreme Judicial Court's decision to allow same-sex marriages within Massachusetts. The Green-Rainbow party supports having an economic bill of rights including a right to food, water, health care, housing and education. It supports a far bolder and faster transition from fossil fuels to safe, clean renewable energy than the Democratic and Republican parties. It sees climate change as an existential emergency. It supports racial justice and justice for documented and undocumented immigrants including an end to the incarceration epidemic and community control of the police. In 2019, the Green-Rainbow Party State Committee voted to support the elimination of the United States military.

== History ==
=== Establishment of official party status ===
Founded in 1996 as the Massachusetts Green Party, the party attained official political party status in 2000 when the Greens ran Ralph Nader and Winona LaDuke for president of the United States. Official political party status in Massachusetts affects how political groups can use finances, and official political parties are guaranteed ballot access. The Nader ticket received 6% of the vote in Massachusetts, where state law requires 3% during state and national elections for establishing and maintaining official party status. In 2002, the party entered the state gubernatorial race for the first time with Jill Stein as the candidate for governor, Anthony Lorenzen for lieutenant governor, and James O'Keefe for treasurer. Stein and Lorenzen received over 3% and O'Keefe received almost 8% resulting in maintaining state party status in Massachusetts for 2002. An alternate method to establish and maintain state party status in Massachusetts is to have over 1% of voters registered in their party, a threshold that Green-Rainbow has not met either.

=== Merger with Rainbow Coalition ===
In 2002, the party was renamed when it merged with the Rainbow Coalition Party, which was founded by former State Representative Mel King. King endorsed Stein's 2002 candidacy for governor, saying "Jill Stein is the only candidate who will speak truth to power. She's the only one that makes issues of racism and social justice integral parts of her campaign".

=== Campaign 2004 ===
In 2004, with David Cobb as its presidential candidate, the Green-Rainbow ticket was unable to meet the required 3% threshold, and subsequently lost recognition in Massachusetts of state party status. Losing state party status has the results that the expenditures on Massachusetts candidates are subject to the state laws regulating political action committees (or PACs). In addition, the party name is no longer printed on voter registration forms as an option to check off, and the party must collect signatures to place presidential candidates on the ballot; state and local candidates always need signatures to be placed on the ballot.

Also in 2004, Green-Rainbow Party candidate Jill Stein ran for state representative in the 9th Middlesex District, which included portions of Waltham and Lexington.[21] She received 3,911 votes (21.3%) in a three-way race, ahead of the Republican candidate, but behind Democratic incumbent Thomas M. Stanley.

=== Campaign 2006 ===
In March 2006, at its nominating convention, the party nominated five candidates for statewide office: Grace Ross for governor, Wendy Van Horne for lieutenant governor, Jill Stein for secretary of the Commonwealth, James O'Keefe for treasurer, and Nathanael Fortune for auditor. In early April, Nathanael Fortune withdrew his candidacy. The races for secretary of the Commonwealth and treasurer were two-way races between the Democrats and Green-Rainbows, with Green-Rainbows polling higher than ever before on a statewide level. In an April 3, 2006 poll by Suffolk University and WHDH, O'Keefe polled at 21% and Stein at 8%. The Ross / Van Horne team, likely to face three other opponents in the election, polled at 2%, before having officially announced.

When Van Horne withdrew from the race in early September, she was replaced by Martina Robinson, a 30-year-old disability and equal marriage rights activist.

Ross and Robinson only garnered 2% of the vote in the gubernatorial election. However Stein won 18% in the race for Secretary of State and James O'Keefe won 16% in the race for State Treasurer. As a result, the Green-rainbow Party once again qualified for ballot access.

=== Campaign 2010 ===
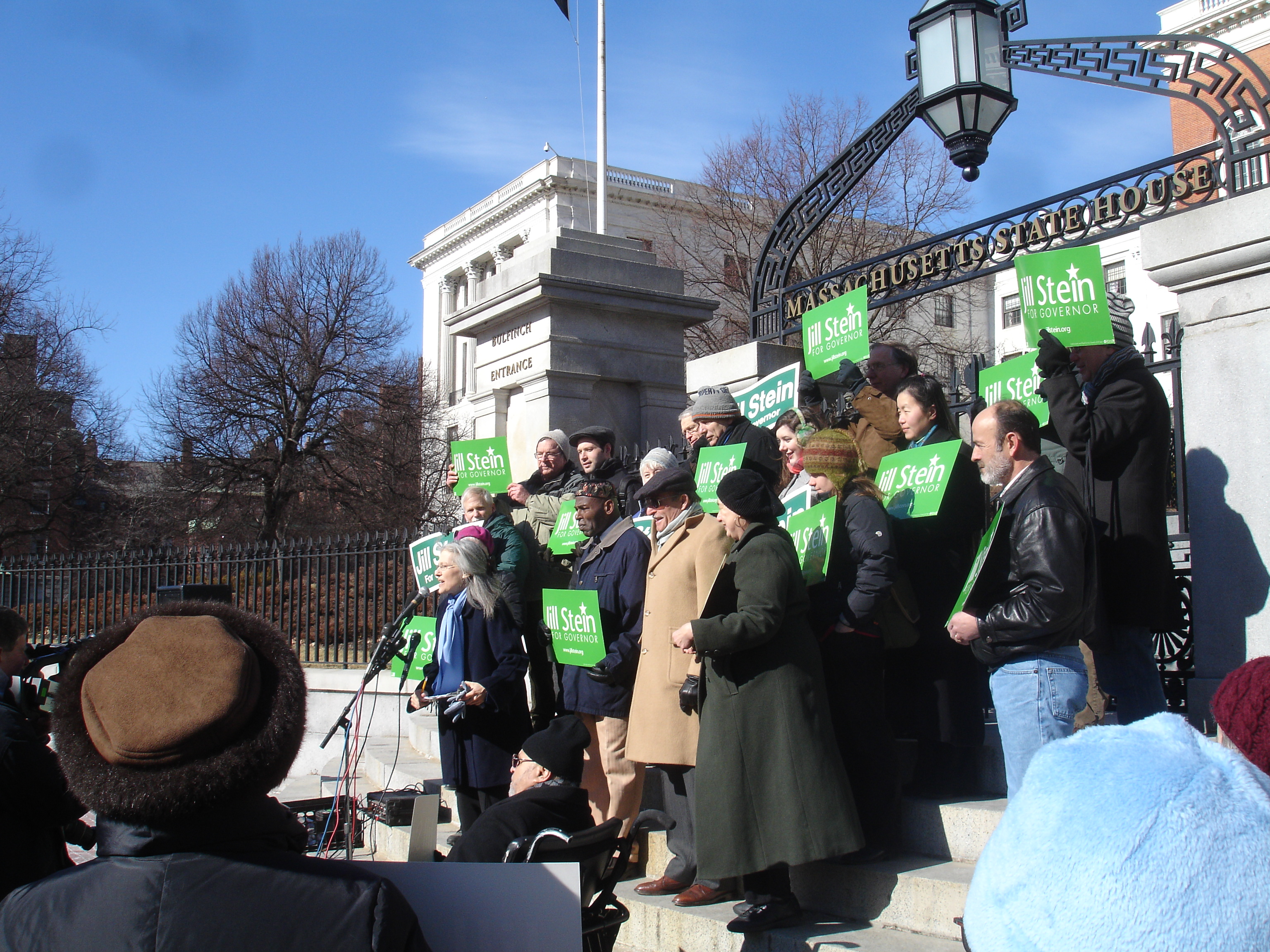
Jill Stein announcing her candidacy for governor in February 2010

Jill Stein officially announced her entrance into the governor's race on the steps of the Massachusetts State House in Boston on February 8, 2010. As of February 25, she was polling at 3% in that race. Stein announced on April 3, 2010, that her lieutenant governor running mate would be Richard P. 'Rick' Purcell (born December 21, 1959), an ergonomics specialist from Holyoke. Purcell was born in 1959 in Albuquerque, New Mexico and grew up on the Tohajiilee Indian Reservation in New Mexico. He moved to Holyoke, Massachusetts in 1974 and graduated from Chicopee Comprehensive High School in 1977. He works as an ergonomics specialist with Baystate Medical Center in Springfield, Massachusetts. Purcell served as a buck sergeant during the Gulf War. He was also stationed in Korea and Germany. Purcell sought election to the Holyoke City Council in 2002, 2007, 2011 and 2013.

Beyond Stein's run for governor, three additional candidates ran for office as Green-Rainbow candidates: two for the state legislature and one for state auditor. In the state's 4th Berkshire District, Lee Scott Laugenour announced that he would challenge incumbent State Representative William "Smitty" Pignatelli. The state's 3rd Berkshire District saw a race between Green-Rainbow Party candidate Mark Miller and incumbent candidate Christopher N. Speranzo. Nat Fortune rounded out the ticket, running for Massachusetts Auditor.

On election day Mark Miller received 30 percent of the vote in a four-way race, losing by 192 votes, the best result for any Green running for state legislature in the United States in 2010. Miller received 1,748 votes, and was bested by the Democratic candidate Patricia Farley-Bouvier who received 1,940 votes (33%). Two other candidates, Pam Malmurphy(I) (1,325 votes- 22%) and Mark Jester (R) (899 votes- 15%) also ran. In the race for State Auditior, Nat Fortune received 5 percent of the vote guaranteeing the Green-Rainbow Party official party status in Massachusetts for the subsequent two years.

=== Campaign 2012 ===
In 2012, Green-Rainbow Party leader Jill Stein won the presidential nomination of the Green Party of the United States. Stein received 456,169 nationwide while advocating for a Green New Deal to address climate change and financial crises. In Massachusetts, Stein received 19,672 votes (1%). Because Stein did not receive 3% of the vote statewide, the Green-Rainbow Party lost party status.

=== Campaign 2014, regaining of official party status ===
In November 2014, Green-Rainbow Party Statewide candidates Danny Factor (Secretary of State), Ian Jackson (Treasurer) and MK Merelice (auditor) all received more than 3% of the vote which resulted in the Green-Rainbow Party gaining back official party status.

=== Campaign 2015 ===
The Green-Rainbow Party ran three candidates for office in the November 2015 election: Darlene Elias for Holyoke City Council, Plinio Degoes for Cambridge City Council, and Sean Connell for Fall River School Committee. None of the candidates won their election, but all made strong showings, considering that they were all first time candidates.

=== Campaign 2016 ===
The Green-Rainbow Party Massachusetts presidential primary took place on March 1. Five candidates appeared on the ballot, the results are as follows:

County results of the Massachusetts Green presidential primaries, 2016. Jill Stein

Massachusetts Green Party presidential primary, March 1, 2016
Candidate	Votes	Percentage	National delegates
Jill Stein	768	45.7%	5
Sedinam Moyowasifza-Curry	78	4.7%	1
Darryl Cherney	54	3.2%	0
Kent Mesplay	37	2.2%	0
William Kreml	24	1.4%	0
Others	436	25.9%	4
No Preference	199	11.8%	4
Blank votes	85	5.0%	n/a
Total	1,681	100.00%	10

All members of the party were able to apply to be delegates to be sent to the national convention. The number of voters that took part in the election slightly increased from the 1,554 that took part in the 2012 primary. On August 6, 2016 at the Green Party Presidential Nominating Convention in Houston, Jill Stein was nominated as the Green Party candidate for President and Ajamu Baraka was nominated as the Green Party candidate for Vice-President.

In the November 8, 2016 general election, presidential candidate Jill Stein received 1.4% of the vote in Massachusetts, Green-Rainbow Party candidate for State Representative Charlene DiCalogero (12th Worcester District) received 20% of the vote in a two-person race, and Green-Rainbow Party candidate for State Representative Danny Factor (14th Middlesex District) received 3.3% of the vote in a three-way race.

=== Campaign 2017 ===
On May 2, 2017, Sharon Moss, Green-Rainbow Party member and former Central Massachusetts Green-Rainbow Chapter Co-Chair was elected as a Town Meeting Member, Precinct 8, in Shrewsbury. This was a competitive race with 8 incumbents and 14 total candidates for 10 seats. On May 8, 2017, Green-Rainbow Party member and former candidate for State Representative Charlene DiCalogero was elected Library Trustee for the town of Berlin, Massachusetts. DiCalogero received 648 of the 649 votes cast in the election. On May 9, 2017 Green-Rainbow Party member Damon Jespersen (from the village of Byfield, Massachusetts) was re-elected selectperson from the town of Newbury, Massachusetts in a contested race. This was a competitive race with Jesperson being one of three candidates vying for two seats. Jesperson finished second with 690 votes ahead of the third place challenger who had 611 votes.

In June 2017 Green-Rainbow Party member and Smith College Physics Professor Joyce Palmer-Fortune was elected selectperson from the town of Whately. Palmer-Fortune defeated her only opponent by a slim 37 vote margin. Palmer-Fortune previously had held the seat from 2009 until 2015 and had promoted clean, green energy solutions during her tenure. In the spring of 2017, Gus Steeves was reelected to the Southbridge Town Council. In the summer of 2017, Arlington Massachusetts resident and former Green-Rainbow Party candidate for Treasurer Ian Jackson ran for Massachusetts State Senator in a special election held in July 2017 to fill a vacant seat in the 4th Middlesex District and received 11% of the vote. Green-Rainbow Party member Sean Connell ran for Fall River School Committee and was eliminated in the election runoff, finishing in 16th place.

In the fall of 2017, GRP members Darlene Elias and Juan G. Sanchez ran for the City of Holyoke City Council, both finishing second with 42% and 30% of the vote respectively. Also in the fall of 2017, in an election held on November 7. 2017, GRP member Laurance Kimbrough won election to the School Committee in the City of Cambridge. Laurance was the 6th and final candidate elected under the ranked choice voting system used in Cambridge.

In December 2017, GRP member and elected Library Trustee of Berlin, Charlene DiCalogero, ran as a candidate for State Senate in the Special Election in the Worcester and Middlesex District that was held on December 5, 2017. She received 201 votes, or 1.3%.

=== Campaign 2018, regaining the political party status again ===
In the November 2018 statewide elections, two Green-Rainbow Party Candidates—Juan Sanchez of Holyoke (candidate for Secretary of the Commonwealth, 3.8% of the vote) and Jamie Guerin of Northampton (candidate for Treasurer and Receiver-General of Massachusetts, 3.5% of the vote) both reached the 3% of the vote threshold to once acquire for the Green-Rainbow Party official state party status. As a result, the Green-Rainbow Party became one of four recognized political parties in Massachusetts.

Additionally in the November 2018 elections, Jed Stamas, (Green-Rainbow Party Candidate for State Auditor) received 2.6% of the vote, Matthew Moncreaff, (Green-Rainbow candidate for State Representative, 1st Worcester District) received 22.1% of the vote, Danny Factor (Green-Rainbow Party Candidate for State Representative, 14th Middlesex District) received 10% of the vote, Yasmine Khdeer (Green-Rainbow Party Candidate for State Representative, 2nd Worcester District) received 3% of the vote, and Green-Rainbow Party endorsed unenrolled candidate Terra Friedrichs won 2% of the vote in her candidacy for State Senate in the Middlesex and Worcester District.

In municipal elections earlier in 2018, Green-Rainbow Party member David Spanagel was elected Library Trustee in the town of Lancaster, Massachusetts, and Green-Rainbow Party member and incumbent Town Meeting Member Brian Moss was re-elected in Shrewsbury, Massachusetts, Precinct 8.

=== Campaign 2019 ===
In March 2019, Green-Rainbow Party member Jim Snyder-Grant ran for Acton Board of Selectmen and won over 1,000 votes (nearly a third of the vote in a three-way race) and lost by 31 votes. (Snyder-Grant was later elected to the same position in 2020, but by that time was no longer a member of the GRP.) GRP member Edward 'Tar' Larner was re-elected to the Concord Housing Authority and GRP member Matthew Moncreaff was elected to the town of Princeton Select Board. In July 2019, the Green-Rainbow Party hosted the Green Party Annual National Meeting at Salem State University in Salem, Massachusetts.

=== Campaign 2020 ===
In November 2020, Green-Rainbow Party member and party co-chair Charlene DiCalogero ran for State Representative from the 12th Worcester District in a three-way race and received 4.5% of the vote (1,100 votes.) The GRP engaged in campaign work supporting the Green Party's nominees for President and Vice-President, Howie Hawkins and Angela Walker.

=== Presidential nominee results ===
Since 1996, the Green Party has run a candidate for President of the United States. In 2000, the Green Party of Massachusetts placed Ralph Nader, the nominee of the Green Party of the United States, on the statewide presidential ballot. The highest vote total came in 2000, when Ralph Nader received over 173,000 votes. The lowest vote total came in 2008, when Cynthia McKinney was the nominee. Her campaign received only 6,550 votes. Nader, who was also on the ballot as an independent candidate, received more than 28,000 votes.

Year	Nominee	Votes
1996	Ralph Nader (write-in)	4,734 (0.19%)
2000	Ralph Nader	173,564 (6.42%)
2004	David Cobb	10,623 (0.36%)
2008	Cynthia McKinney	6,550 (0.21%)
2012	Jill Stein	20,691 (0.65%)
2016	Jill Stein	46,910 (1.4%)
2020	Howie Hawkins	18,658 (0.51%)

== Structure and composition ==
=== Chapters and committees ===
The Green-Rainbow Party (GRP) currently has four regular meeting local chapters: Greater Boston, SouthCoast, Central Massachusetts, and Pioneer Valley.

The Party also has an elected State Committee ('State Com') that meets in person four time per year (and at other times by phone conference), and Administrative Committee ('Ad Com') that convenes at least twice per month and working committees such as Membership Diversity and Volunteer Recruitment (MDVR), Candidate Development and Legal (CDLC), and Communications (Com Com) all which normally convene by phone conference. The body with the highest amount of power in the Green-Rainbow Party is its State Convention (consisting of all GRP members) which convenes once per year. In 2020 and 2021, due to the coronavirus pandemic, State Committee meetings and the annual state convention were held by remote video conference.

=== Leadership ===
Co-Chairpersons: Lois Gagnon and Michael Pascucci

Secretary: Maureen Doyle

Party Treasurer: Brian Cady

Membership Director:

Communications Director: Eileen Wheeler Sheehan

Fundraising Director:

== Current Green-Rainbow Party elected officeholders ==
- Bryan Moss, Town Meeting Seat, Precinct 8, Shrewsbury (Worcester County) term through May 2024
- Sharon Moss, Town Meeting Representative, Shrewsbury (Worcester County) term through May 2023
- Edward Tar Larner, Housing Board, Concord (Middlesex County) term through March 2024
- Matthew Moncreaff, Board of Selectman, Princeton (Worcester County) term through May 2022
- Joyce Palmer-Fortune, Select Board, Whately (Franklin County) term though May 2023
- Nat Fortune, Town Moderator, Whately (Franklin County) term though May 2023
- David Spanagel – Lancaster (Worcester County) Library Trustee, term through May 2024
- Vincent O'Connor - Amherst (Hampshire County) Town Meeting Member

Appointed Office Holders

- Roni Beal Westminster Historical Committee
- Maureen Doyle - Southbridge Conservation Committee, Vice Chair
- Danny Factor- Acton Human Services Committee
- Wayne Miller- Beverly Planning Board
- Michael Lavery - Becket (Berkshire County) Historical Committee

== See also ==
- List of State Green Parties
- Massachusetts Libertarian Party
- Massachusetts Socialist Party
- Politics of Massachusetts
- Government of Massachusetts
- Elections in Massachusetts
- Political party strength in Massachusetts
- Law of Massachusetts
- List of politics by U.S. state
