= Massachusetts Newsstand =

Massachusetts Newsstand was a product of ProQuest that provides online fulltext articles from a few selected newspapers published in Massachusetts between the 1980s and the present. It includes some current news coverage for parts of Berkshire, Middlesex, Suffolk, and Worcester counties. It does not include current news for the state's 10 other counties. As of 2012, the product bundle consists of content accessed via: "Search our library resources". Massachusetts Libraries. Massachusetts Board of Library Commissioners. Archived from the original on July 13, 2013.

Newspaper	Area	County	Year coverage begins	Year coverage ends	Current
The Banner	West Boylston	Worcester	2007	Present	Current
The Berkshire Eagle	Pittsfield	Berkshire	2005	Present	Current
The Boston Globe	Boston	Suffolk	1980	Present	Current
Boston Herald	Boston	Suffolk	1991	2011	Non-current
BusinessWest	Springfield		1992	Present	Current
Haverhill Gazette	Haverhill	Essex	1992	1997	Non-current
The Item	Clinton	Worcester	2007	Present	Current
Massachusetts Newswire			2009	Present	Current
Montachusett T&G	Worcester	Worcester	2008	2008	Non-current
El Mundo	Cambridge	Middlesex	1992	1994	Non-current
North Adams Transcript	North Adams	Berkshire	2005	Present	Current
The Patriot Ledger	Quincy	Norfolk	1995	2001	Non-current
Plymouth County Business Review		Plymouth	1991	2009	Non-current
Record	Shrewsbury	Worcester	2007	2008	Non-current
Sentinel & Enterprise	Fitchburg	Worcester	2005	Present	Current
Standard-Times	New Bedford	Bristol	1992	1997	Non-current
The Sun	Lowell	Middlesex	2004	Present	Current
Telegram & Gazette	Worcester	Worcester	1989	Present	Current
Valley Dispatch	Dracut	Middlesex	2011	Present	Current
(No coverage)		Barnstable			Non-current
(No coverage)		Dukes			Non-current
(No coverage)		Franklin			Non-current
(No coverage)		Hampden			Non-current
(No coverage)		Hampshire			Non-current
(No coverage)		Nantucket			Non-current

== See also ==
- List of newspapers in Massachusetts
