= Josephine Wright Chapman =

American architect

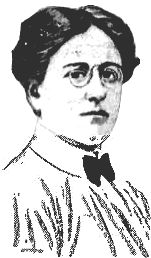
- 1901 portrait of Josephine Wright Chapman.
- Born: 1867
- Died: 1943 (aged 75–76)
- Education: Blackall, Clapp and Whittemore apprenticeship
- Occupation: Architect
- Awards: 1901 Pan-American Exposition New England building award
- Practice: Own practice in Boston and New York
- Buildings: Four of Chapman’s buildings are on the National Register of Historic Places

Josephine Wright Chapman (1867–1943) was a pioneering woman architect, one of fewer than 100 practicing nationally in the first half of the 20th century. She was also the first woman architect "in the history of American architecture to start and head her very own firm," which she accomplished at the tail end of the 19th century. Practicing both in Boston and New York, she got her start as an apprentice in the prestigious Blackall, Clapp and Whittemore firm. Her first practice opened in 1897 in Grundmann Studios, a Boston-based women's art collective. A member of the New York Society of Architects, and one of only 70 female architects in the United States at the time, she was refused admission by both the American Institute of Architects and the Boston Architectural Club on the basis of her gender. Nonetheless, her repertoire soon included "churches, clubs, libraries, and apartments, as well as the Women’s Clubs in Lynn and Worcester, Massachusetts." Chapman's second practice was founded in New York, and that's when her career really took off,"[a]s confirmed by The Ladies’ Home Journal, which noted her popularity: “You can find her [Chapman’s] work everywhere in the environs of New York…”

Four of Chapman's buildings are now in the National Register of Historic Places: Boston's steel-framed Winthrop Building, Harvard's Craigie Arms (since renamed for Chapman), Worcester's Tuckerman Hall and Washington D.C.'s Hillandale, built for the heiress to Standard Oil in 1923.

== Career ==
Chapman's architectural education began in 1892 when Clarence Blackall agreed to let her apprentice under him. Blackall taught her about public building design and how to experiment with new materials. In 1893, the firm designed the first steel-frame building, the Winthrop Building in Boston.

Chapman would go on to set up her own firm in Boston, in Grundmann Studios, a women's art collective, in 1897. "The commission that made her reputation would be the New England Building at the 1901 Pan-American Exposition. She began design work on it as soon as the announcement of the contest for the building appeared in the papers." That set the stage for all of her future success.

Chapman was commissioned by Harvard University to design their Craigie Arms dormitory. While working on that project she also designed St. Mark's Episcopal in Leominster, Massachusetts. By the start of the 20th century, Chapman had six drafters, including one woman, at her firm.

After 1901, she applied to join the American Institute of Architects and the Boston Architectural Club. Both refused to admit her. In 1907, after relocating to New York City, she was accepted by the New York Society of Architects. There, she opened a firm at Washington Square Park, focusing on residential design. Around 1909 she "reign[ed] supreme as the only woman architect in the Hub."

== Gallery ==
(Selection was limited by availability.)

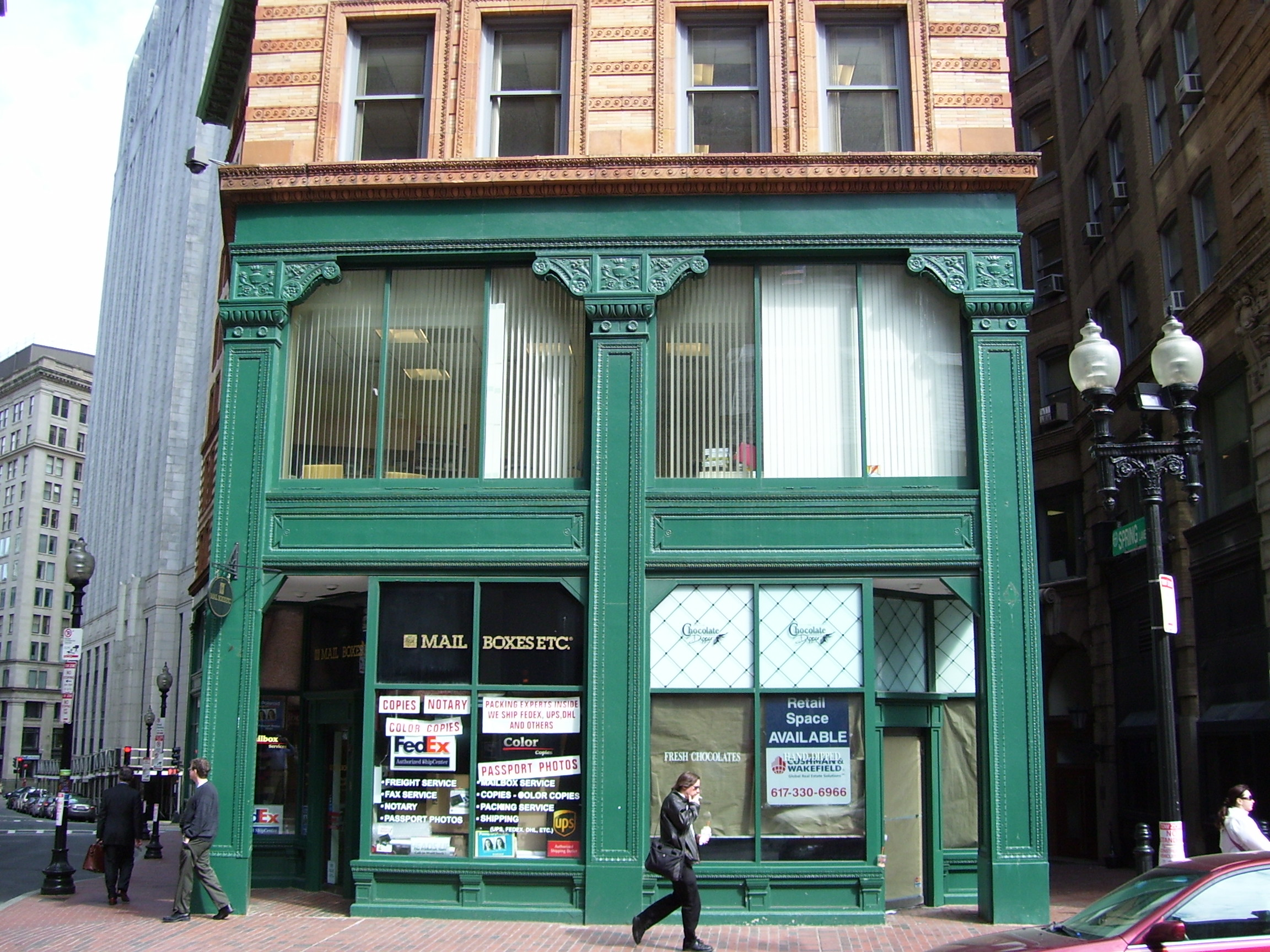
Chapman helped designed Boston's Winthrop Building, the first built with a steel frame, while at Blackall, Clapp and Whittemore in 1893. It is now in the National Historic Register.

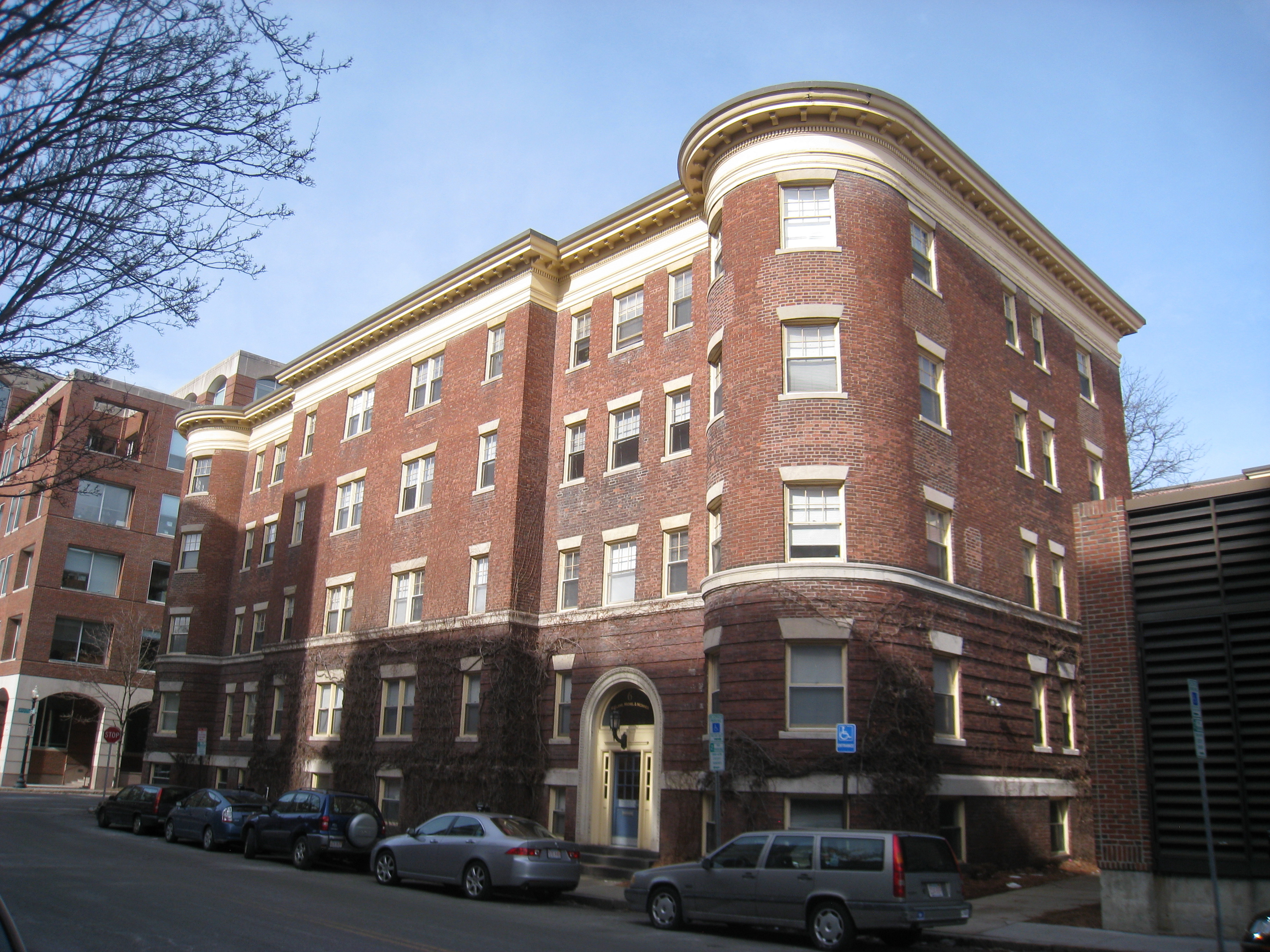
Harvard's Chapman Arms (formerly Craigie Arms), was renamed for the architect. Built in 1897, in Cambridge, MA, it is now in the National Historic Register.

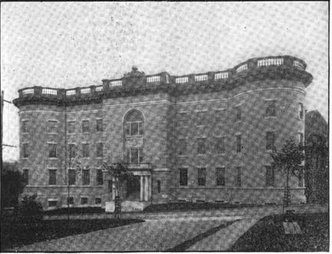
Worcester Woman's Club / Tuckerman Hall, Worcester, MA. (1902) is now in the National Historic Register.

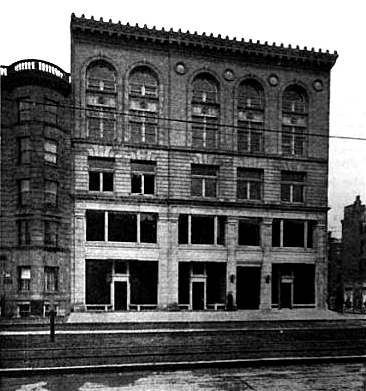
New Century Building, Huntington Ave., Boston, c. 1903.

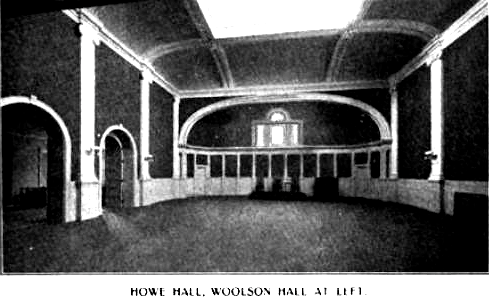
Boston's New Century Building, interior.

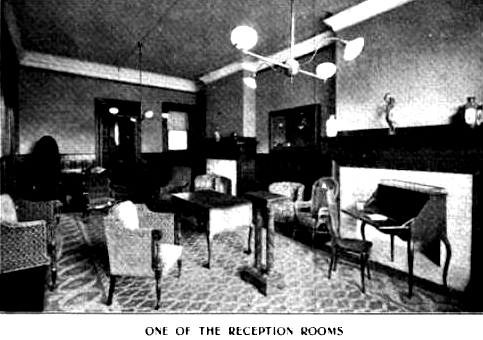
Boston's New Century Building, interior.

== Designs ==
- Craigie Hall / Craigie Arms, Harvard University, Cambridge, Massachusetts (1897)
- All Saints Episcopal church, Attleboro, Mass. (c. 1900)
- Episcopal church, Leominster, Mass. (c. 1900)
- New England Building, Pan-American Exposition, Buffalo, New York, 1901
- Worcester Woman's Club / Tuckerman Hall, Worcester, Mass. (1902)
- New Century Building, Huntington Ave., Boston (c. 1903)
- Hillandale, Georgetown, Washington DC (1922)
- Houses, Douglas Manor, Queens, NY (c. 1916)

== Personal ==
Chapman was described as "modest, direct, simple," with "ability, energy, and indomitable faith in herself." (Ladies Home Journal, October 1914). Raised in Fitchburg, Massachusetts, Chapman was one of four daughters to Mary E. Wright and James Levi Chapman, the president of the Fitchburg Machine Works. Miss Chapman retired in 1925 and moved to Paris. She later went to England, where her London home was destroyed in the aerial blitz of 1940. She then moved to Bradford-on-Avon.

== See also ==
- Women in architecture
