= Institutional District =

Historic district in Massachusetts, United States

- U.S. National Register of Historic Places
- U.S. Historic district
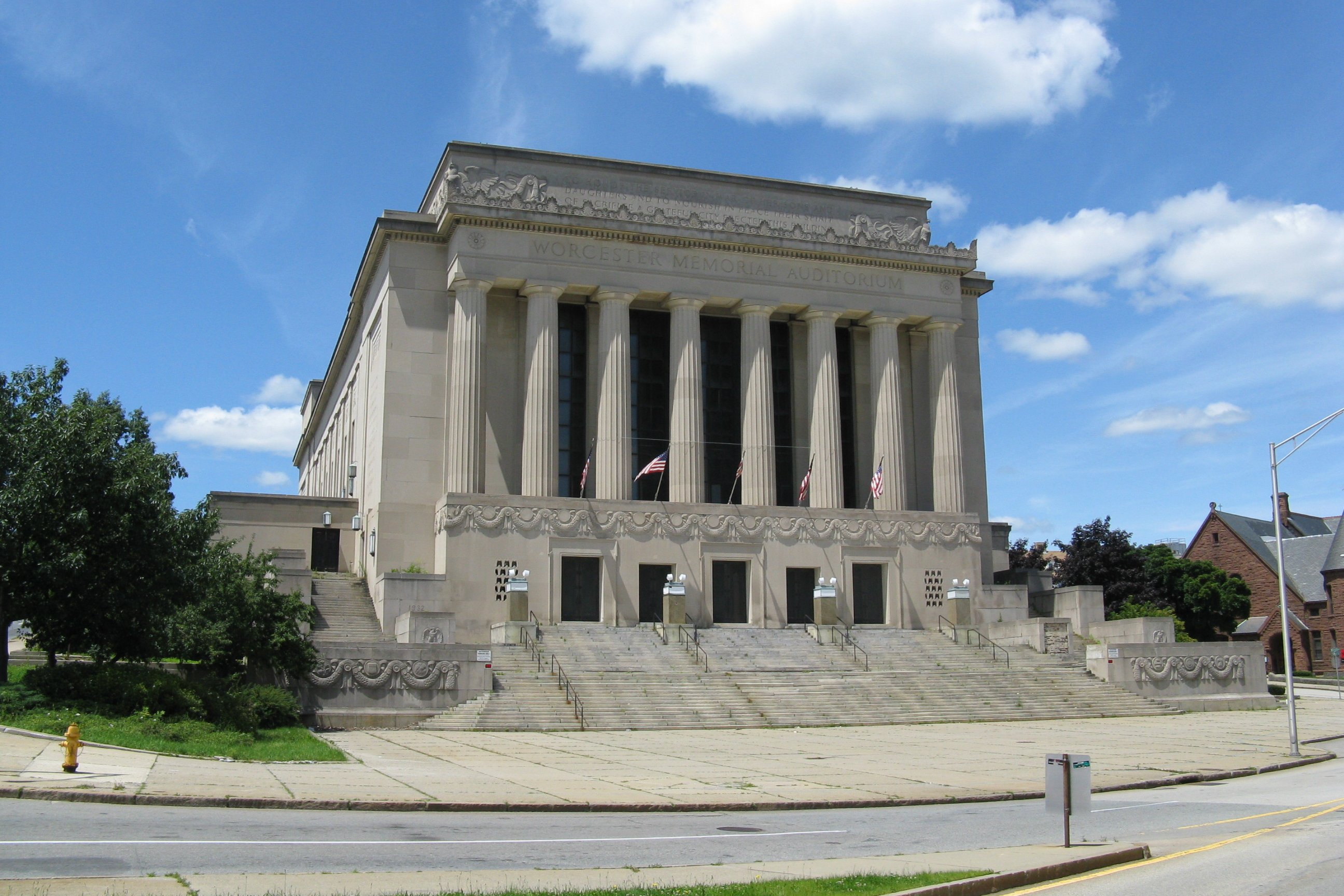
- Worcester Memorial Auditorium

- Location within Massachusetts Location within the United States
- Location: Properties on Lincoln and Wheaton Squares and on Salisbury and Tuckerman Sts., Worcester, Massachusetts
- Coordinates: 42°16′20″N 71°48′4″W
- Built: 1843
- Architect: Young, Ammi B., et al.
- Architectural style: Classical Revival, Greek Revival, Georgian Revival
- MPS: Worcester MRA
- NRHP reference No.: 80000554
- Added to NRHP: March 05, 1980

The Institutional District of Worcester, Massachusetts is an historic district encompassing a significant concentration of civic and municipal buildings north of the city's downtown area. It is centered on Lincoln Square and Wheaton Square, and includes properties on Main, Salisbury, and Tuckerman Streets. It includes the 1840s Worcester County Courthouse, the War Memorial and Memorial Auditorium, and the former Worcester Historical Society building at 39 Salisbury Street. The 1897 Worcester Art Museum is included in the district, as is the c. 1890 armory building at 44 Salisbury Street. The district was listed on the National Register of Historic Places in 1980.

Prior to its institutional uses, this part of Worcester was largely owned by the Salisbury family, whose progenitor, Stephen Salisbury I, opened a store at Lincoln Square in 1772. Salisbury's grandson, Stephen Salisbury III, was a major local industrialist, and began donating and selling portions of the family holdings in the 1880s. His donations included land for the Central Church, Boys' Club, Art Museum, Auditorium, and War Memorial. He was a major benefactor of the museum, bequesting it the family collection. The Salisbury Mansion and Store, now owned by the museum, are located just outside this district.

== Contributing properties ==
- Worcester County Courthouse, 2 Main Street (1845), by Ammi B. Young; 1878 addition by Stephen C. Earle; 1899 addition by Andrews, Jaques & Rantoul; 1950s addition (non-contributing in this nomination, but contributing in the 2021 individual NR nomination for the courthouse).
- Worcester War Memorial, Lincoln Square (1935) by Lucius W. Briggs and Frederic C. Hirons
- Worcester Boys' Club (1930), Lincoln Square by Frost, Chamberlain & Edwards
- Worcester War Memorial Auditorium (1932), by Lucius W. Briggs and Frederic C. Hirons
- Central Church, Salisbury Street (1885), by Stephen C. Earle
- Worcester Historical Society, 39 Salisbury Street (1981), by Barker & Nourse
- Worcester Woman's Club (aka Tuckerman Hall), 10 Tuckerman Street (1902), by Josephine Wright
- Worcester Industrial Technical Institute (aka Worcester Voke), 2 Grove Street (1909), with additions (1916–1917) by Frost, Briggs & Chamberlain
- Worcester National Guard Armory, 44 Salisbury Street (1890), by Fuller & Delano, with addition (1907)
- North High School, 46 Salisbury Street (1889), by Fuller & Delano
- Worcester Art Museum, 55 Salisbury Street (1897), by Stephen C. Earle, with later additions

== Gallery ==
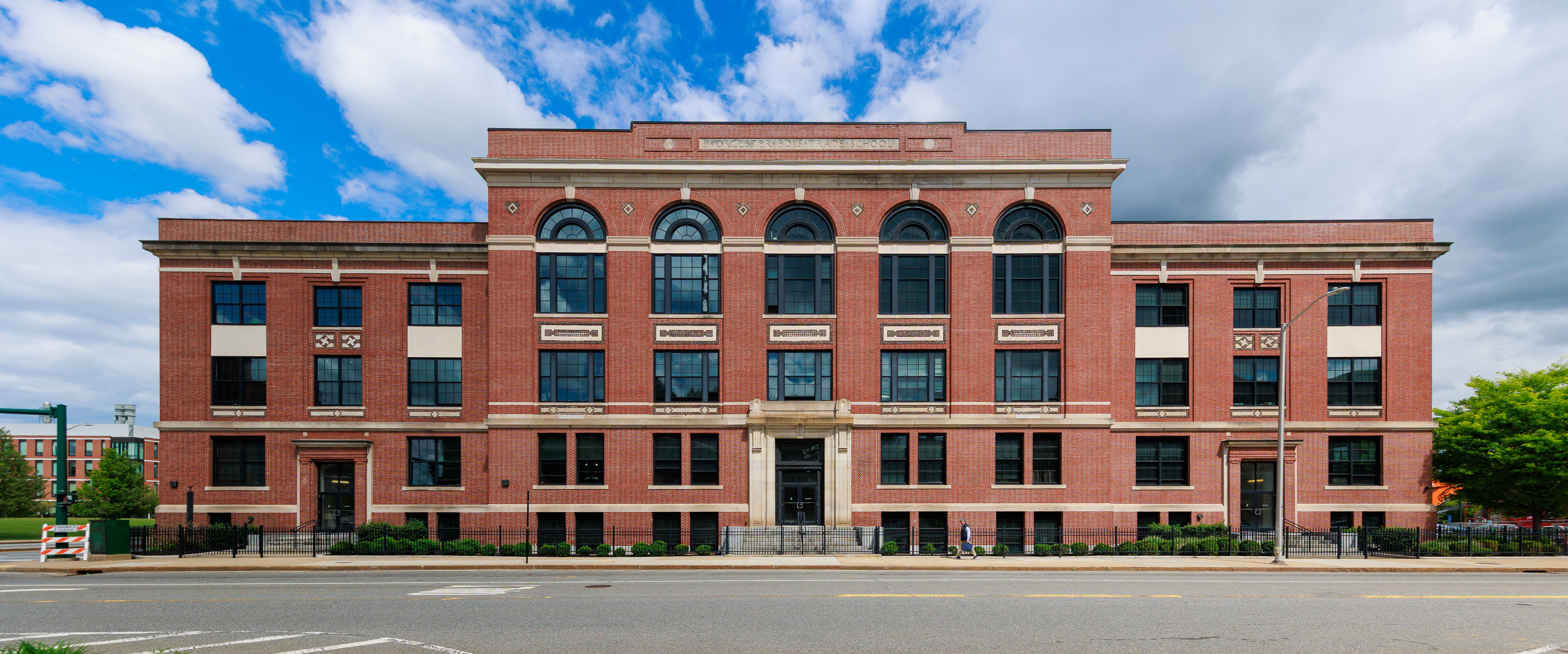
Worcester Industrial Technical Institute

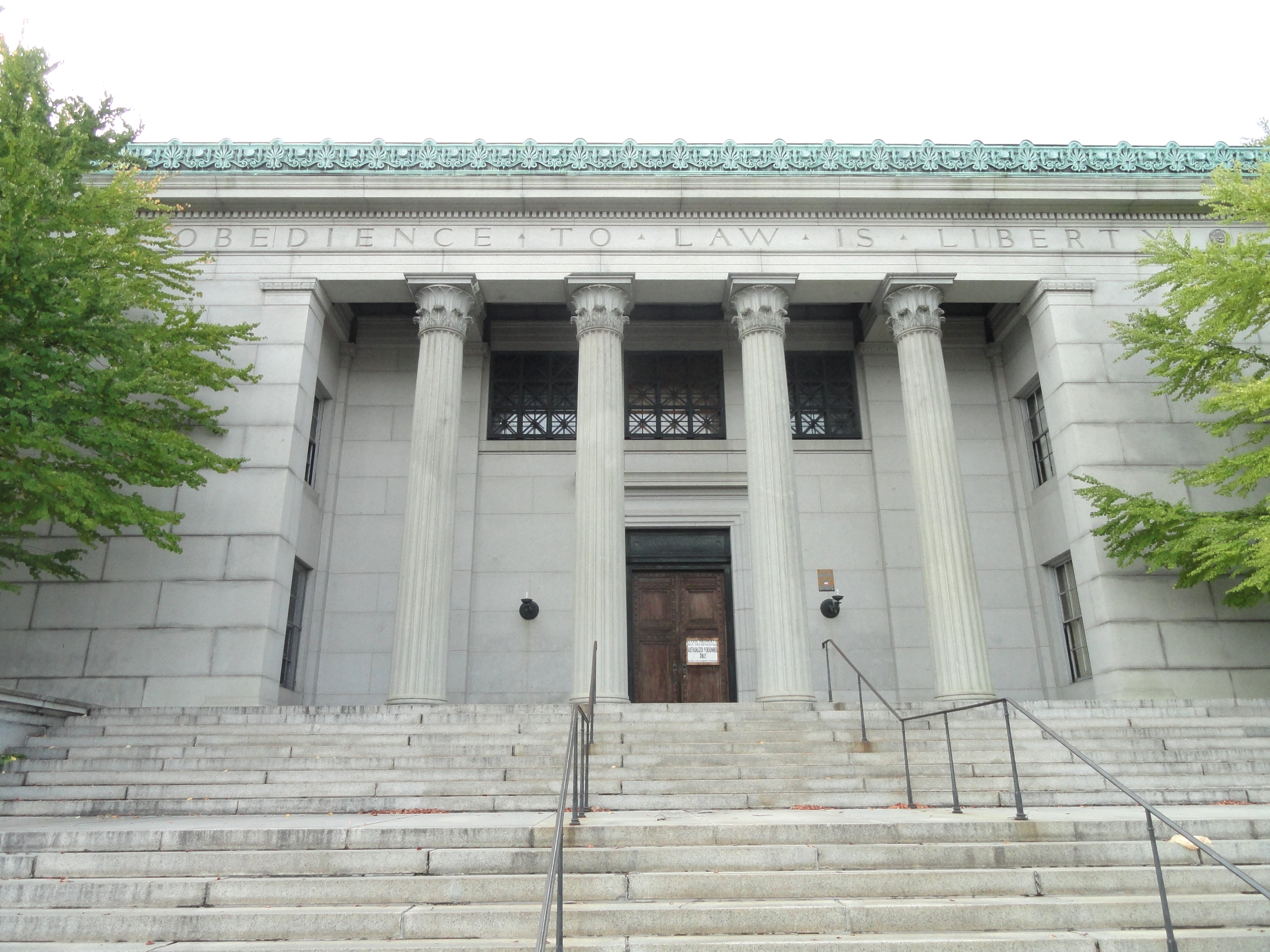
Worcester County Courthouse

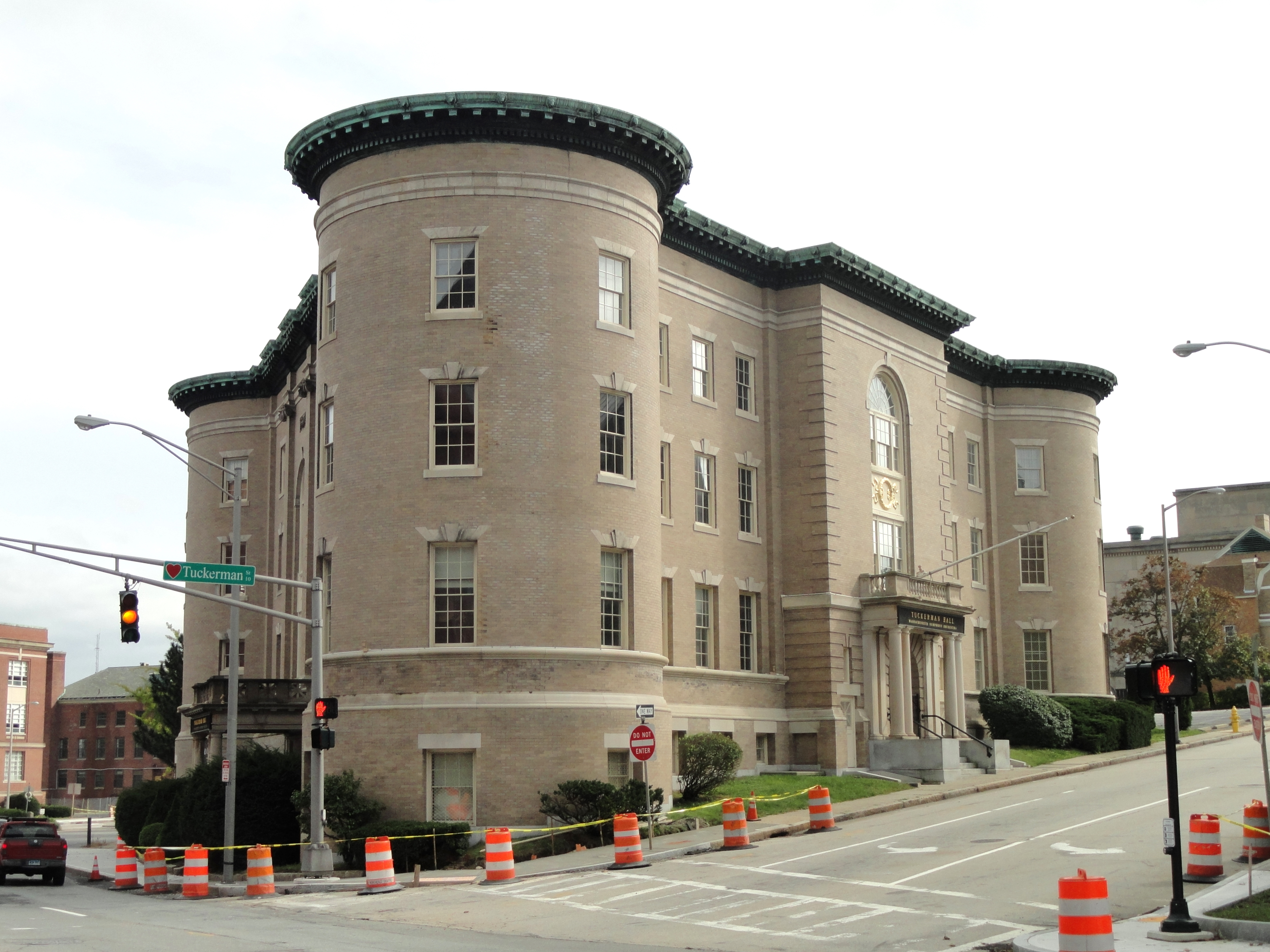
Worcester Woman's Club (Tuckerman Hall)

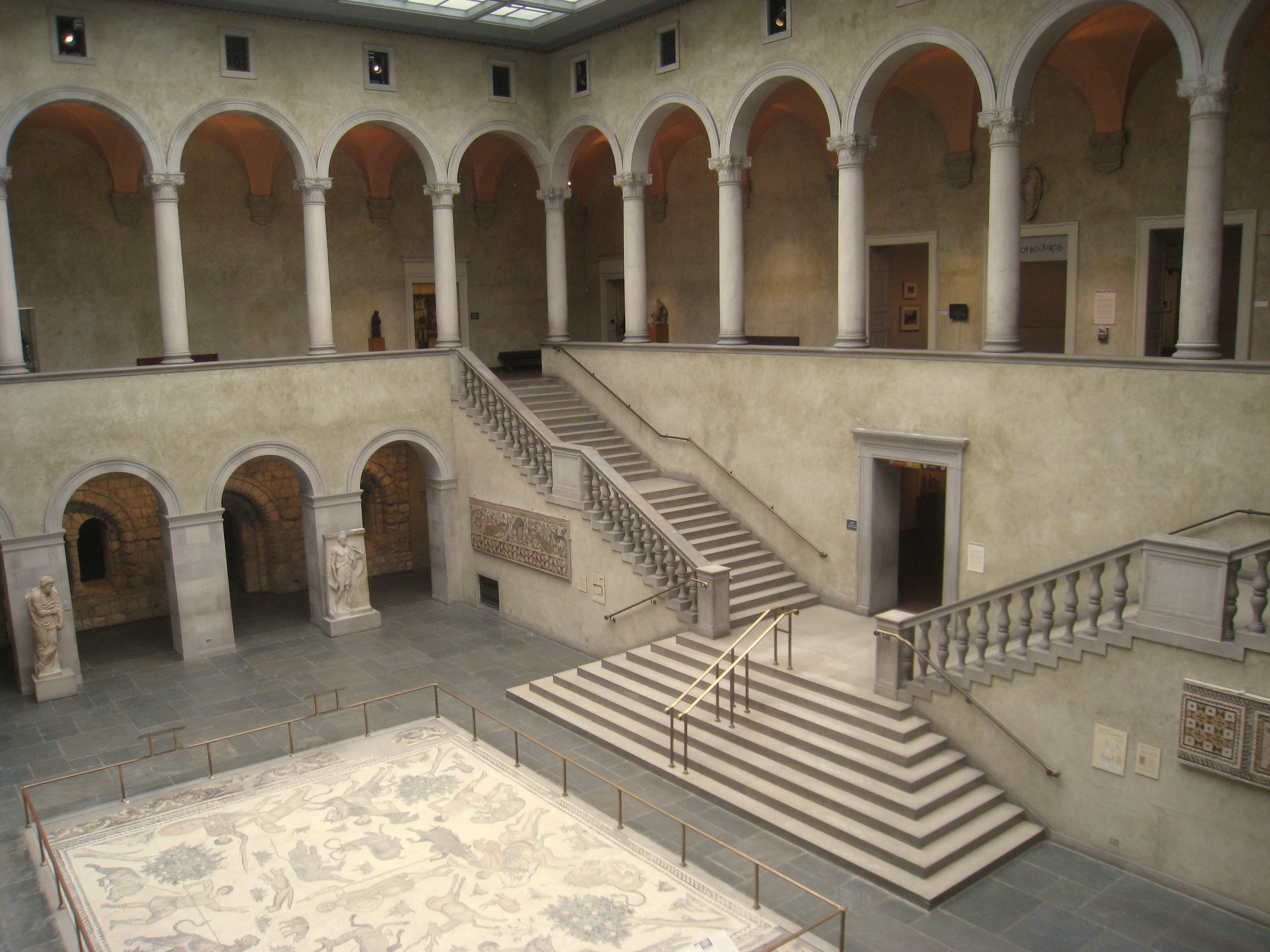
Worcester Art Museum (interior)

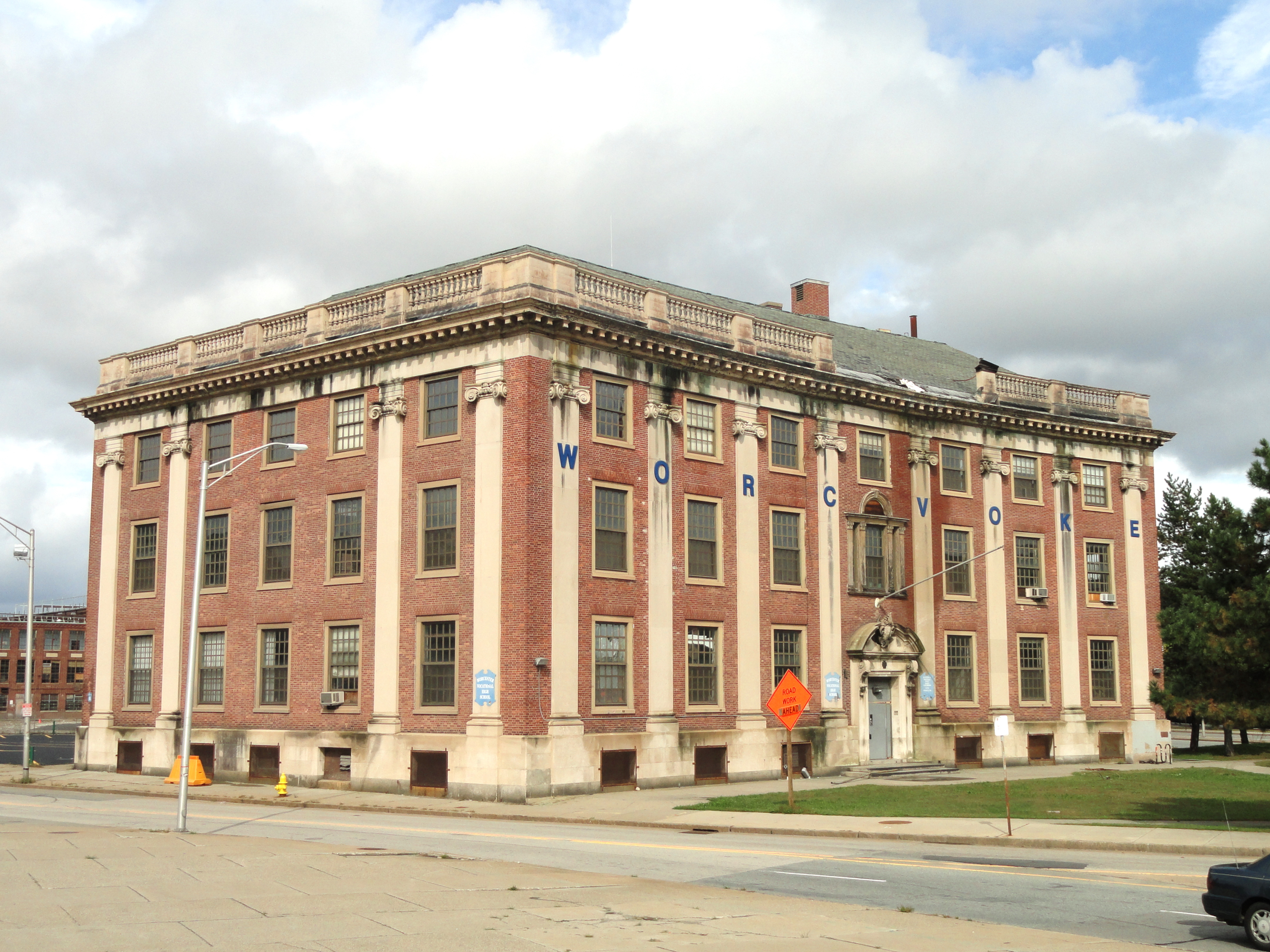
Worcester Boys' Club

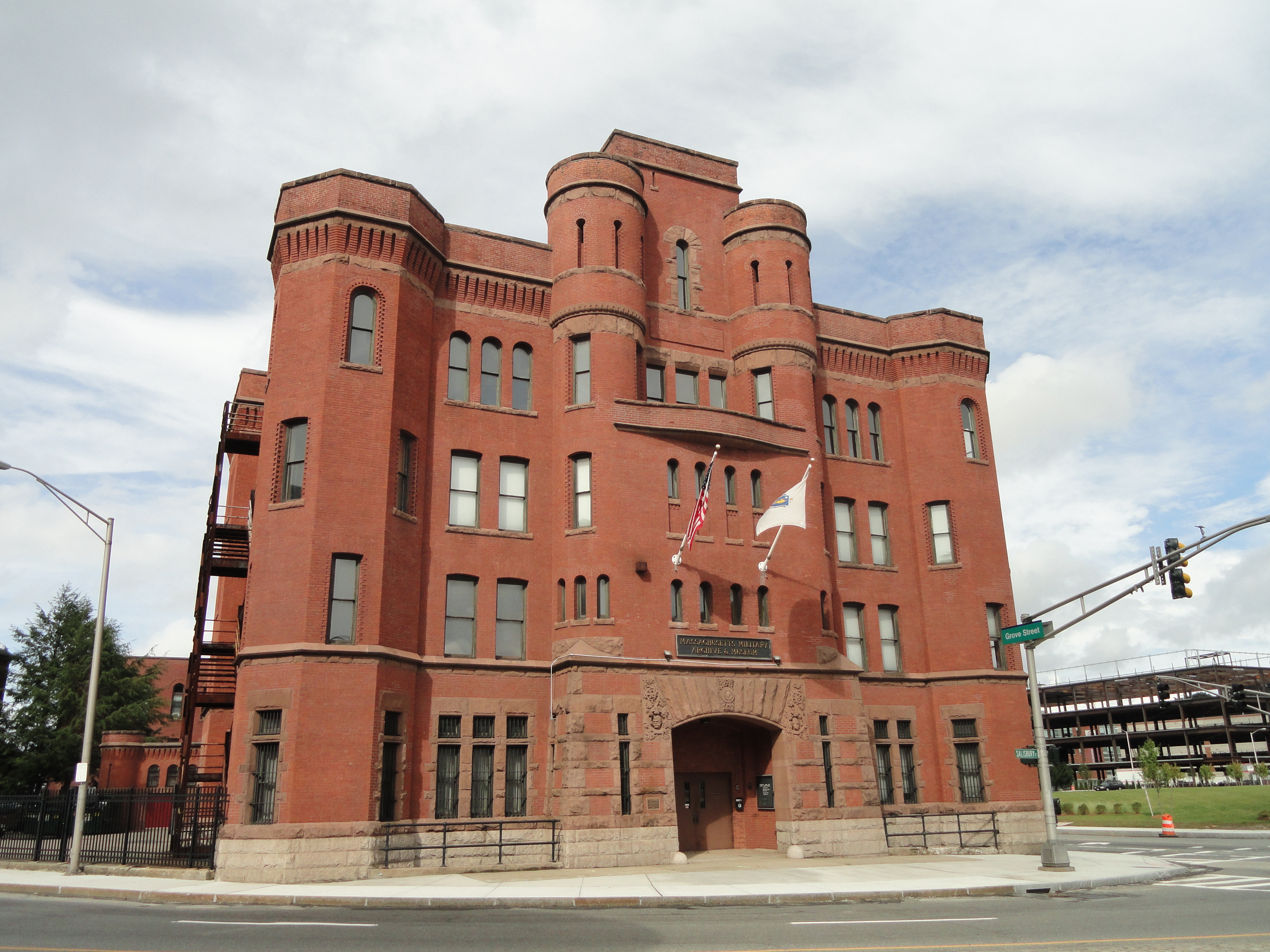
Worcester National Guard Armory

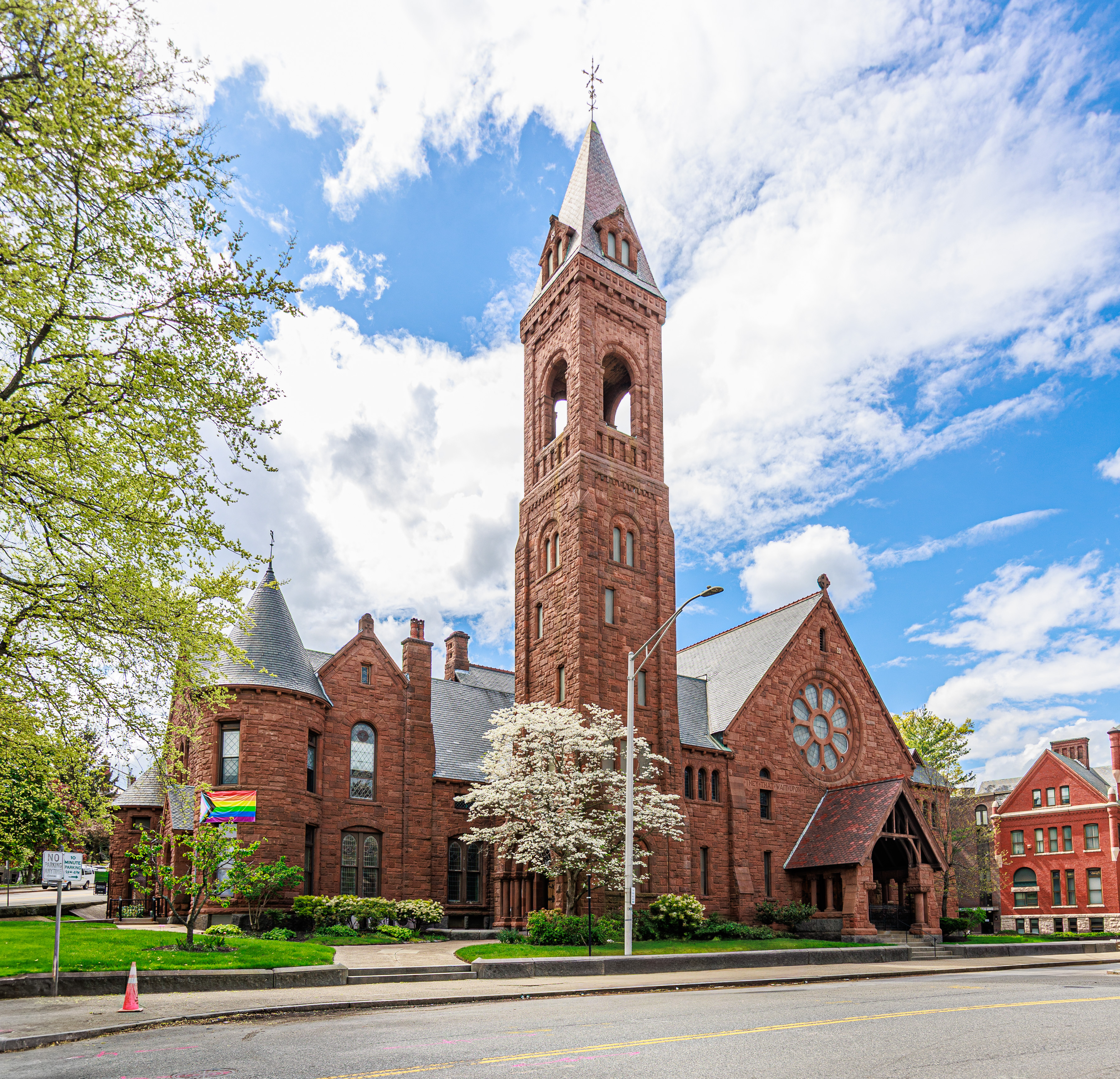
Central Church

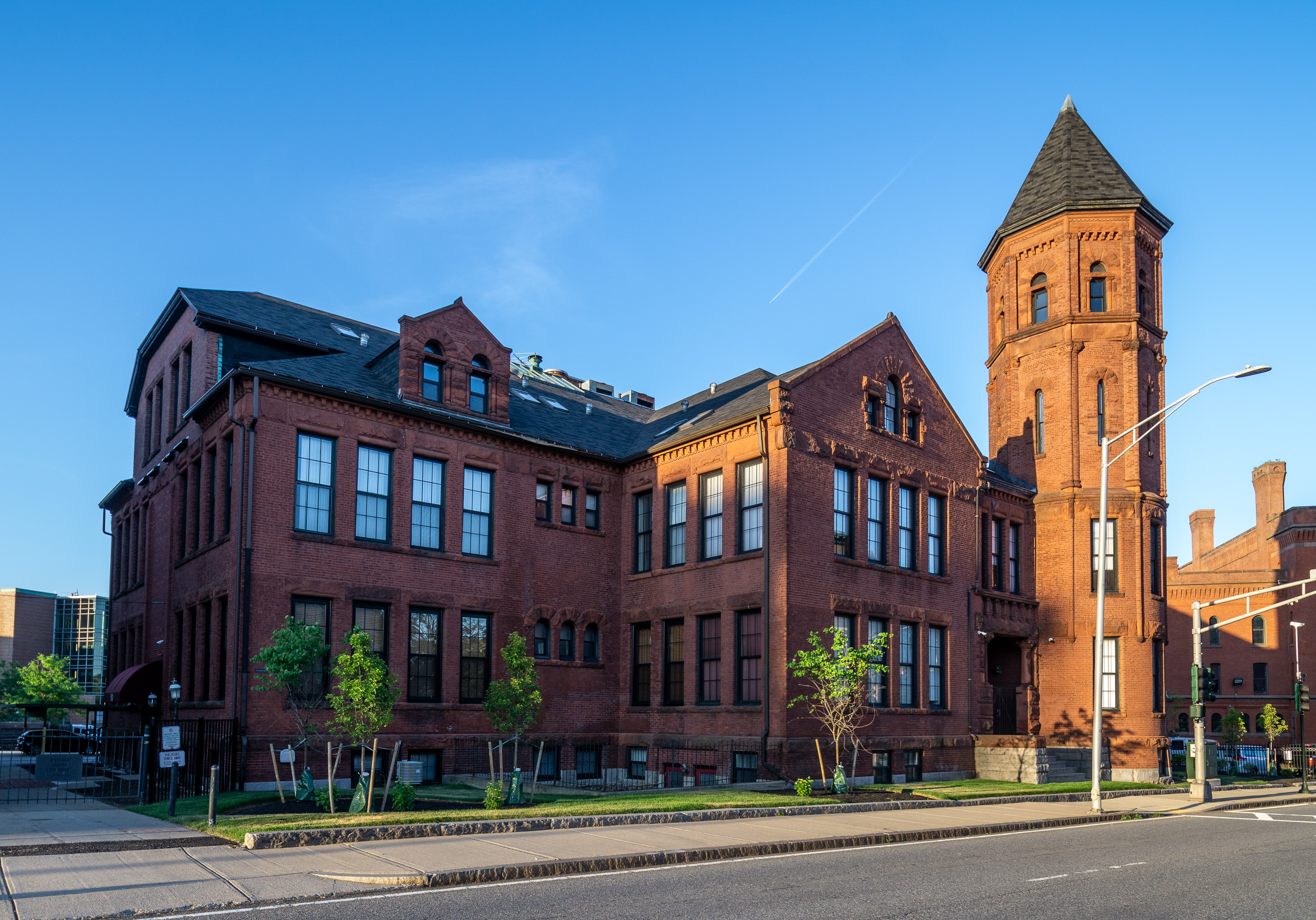
North High School (1889 building)

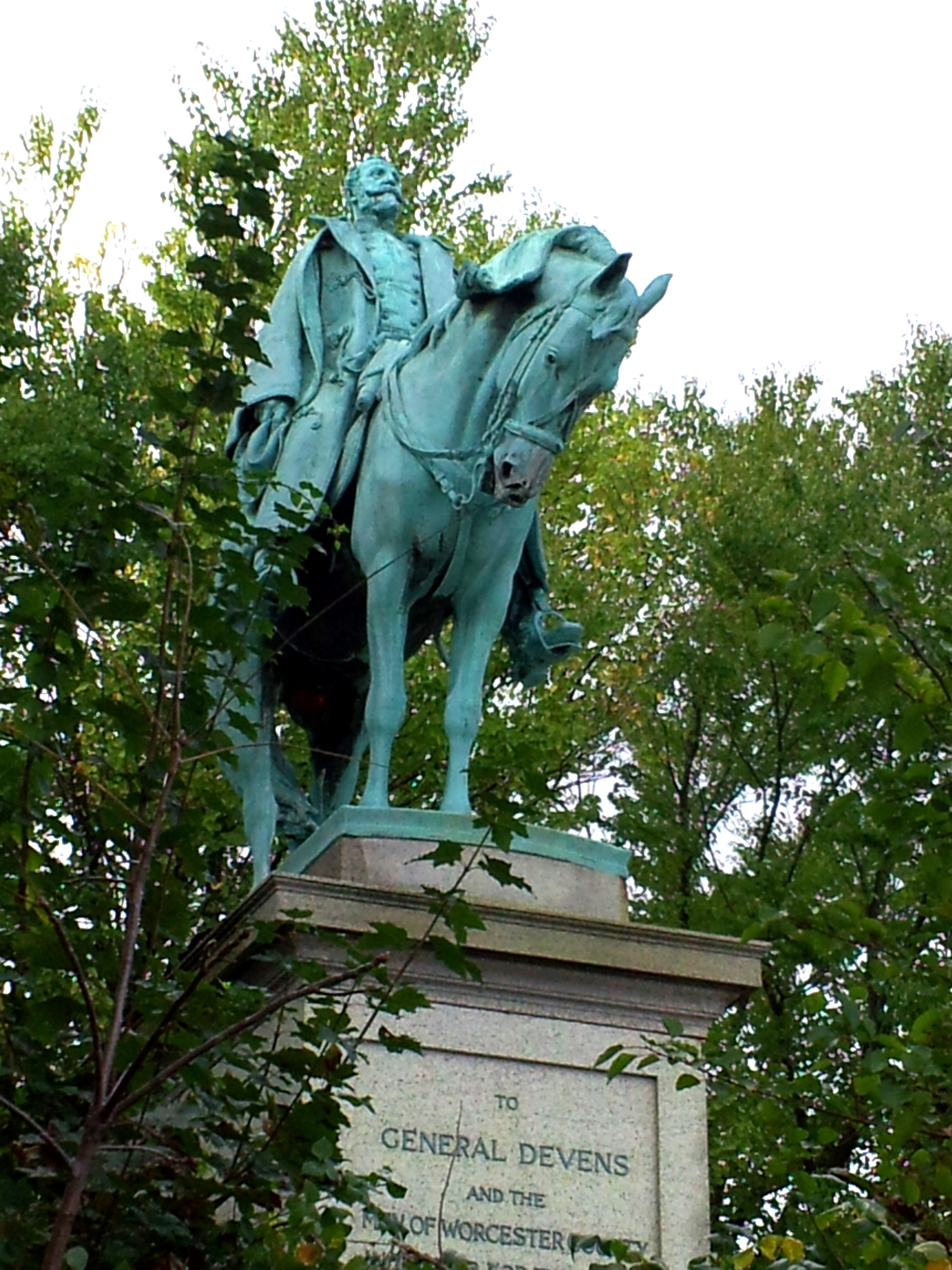
Equestrian statue of Charles Devens

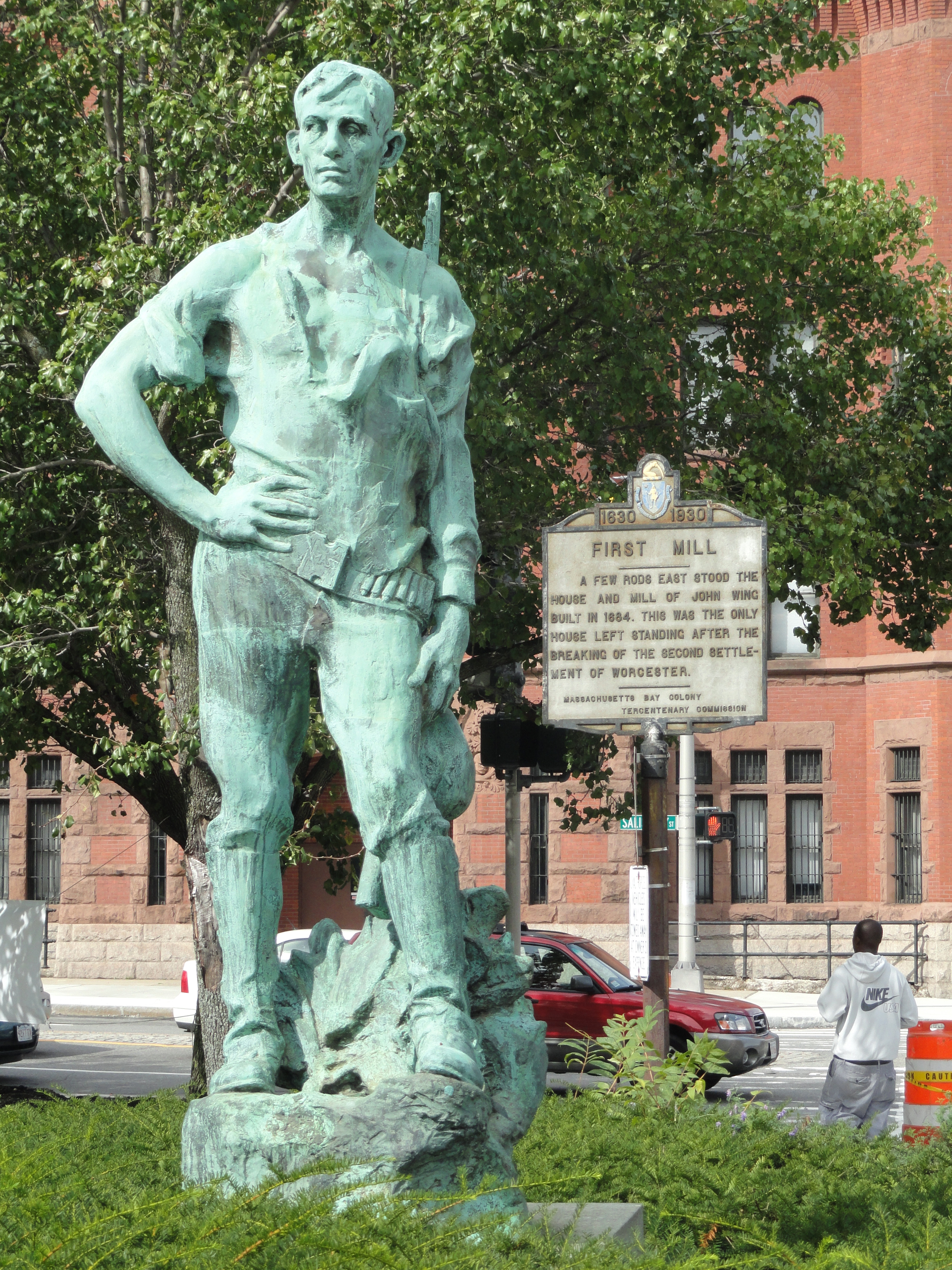
"1898" statue in Wheaton Square

== See also ==
- National Register of Historic Places listings in northwestern Worcester, Massachusetts
- National Register of Historic Places listings in Worcester County, Massachusetts
