= Craigie Arms =

Historic residential building in Massachusetts, United States

- U.S. National Register of Historic Places
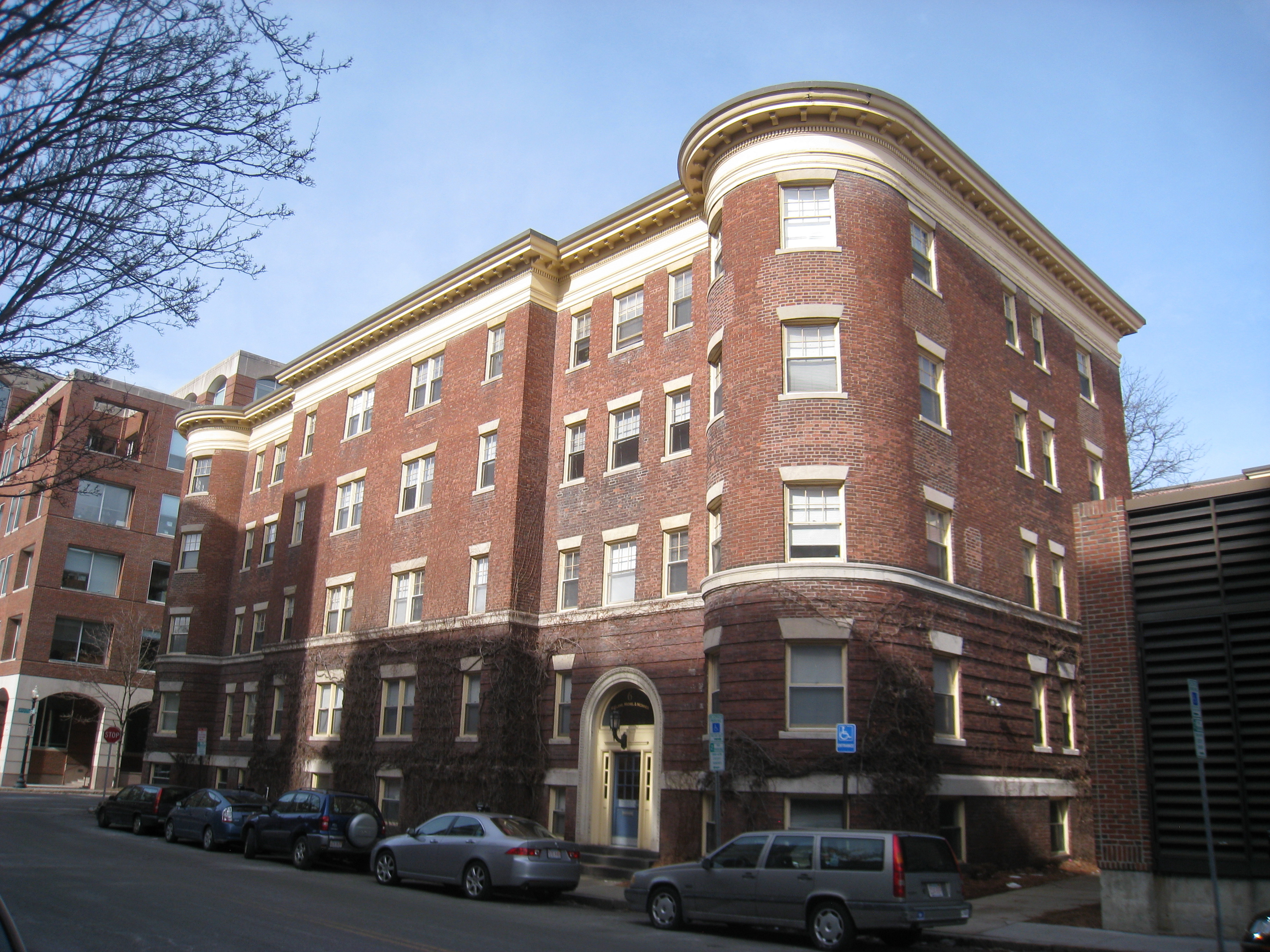

- Location within Massachusetts Location within the United States
- Location: 2–6 University Road, 122 Mt. Auburn, and 6 Bennett Streets, Cambridge, Massachusetts
- Coordinates: 42°22′22.8″N 71°7′22.5″W
- Built: 1897
- Architect: Josephine Wright Chapman
- Architectural style: Colonial Revival
- MPS: Cambridge MRA
- NRHP reference No.: 86001575
- Added to NRHP: July 10, 1986

Craigie Arms is a historic apartment house in Cambridge, Massachusetts. Located in Harvard Square, the Georgian Revival four-story brick building was built in 1897 to meet local demand for apartment-style housing. The building occupies most of a city block along University Road, Mount Auburn Street, and Bennett Street. It is notable for its relatively modest decoration and the rounded corner projections.

The building was listed on the National Register of Historic Places in 1986.

== See also ==
- National Register of Historic Places listings in Cambridge, Massachusetts
