= Phoenix Building (Rockland, Massachusetts) =

- U.S. National Register of Historic Places
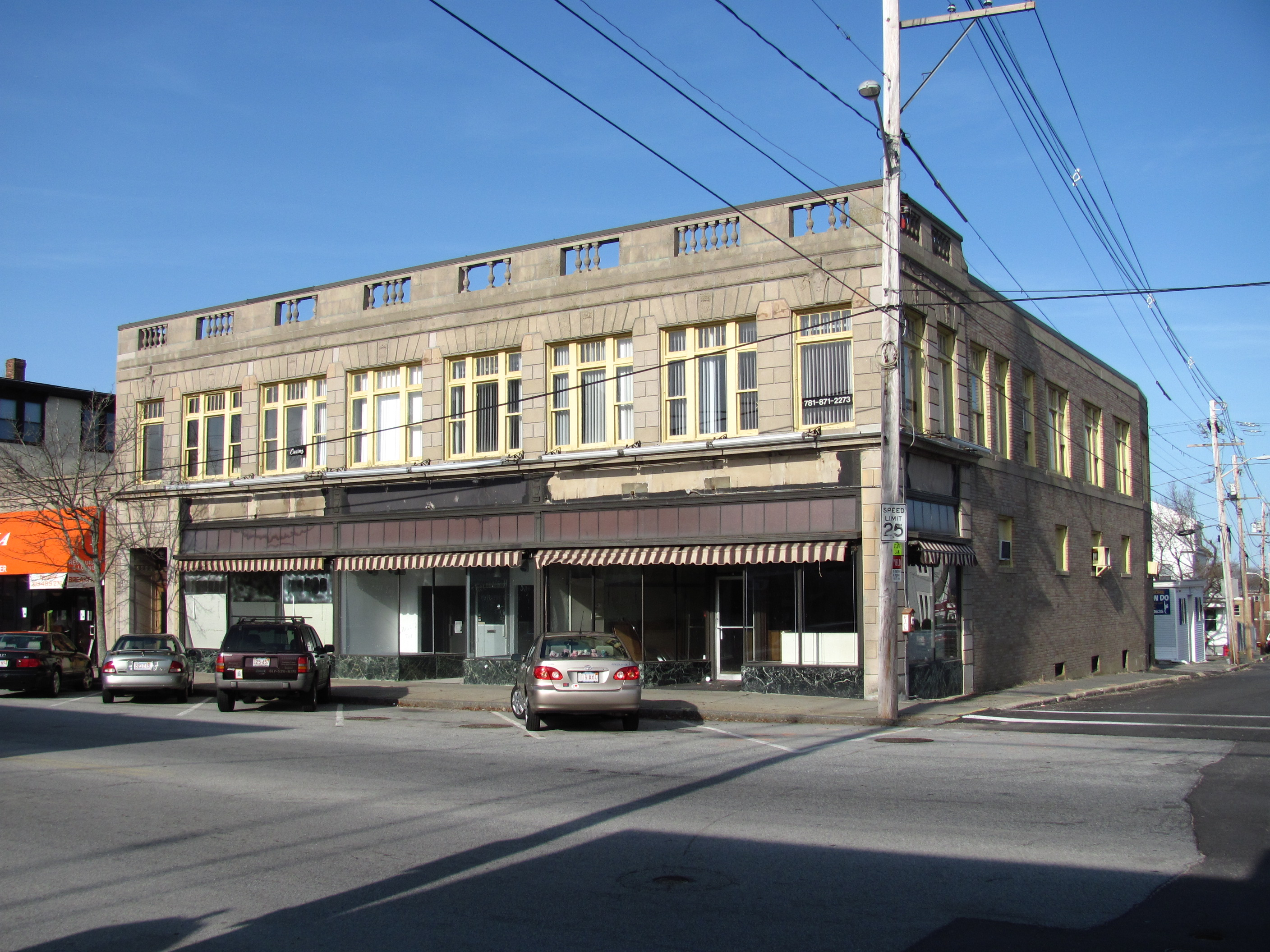
- (2010)

- Location within Massachusetts Location within the United States
- Location: 315-321 Union St., Rockland, Massachusetts
- Coordinates: 42°8′16″N 70°54′59″W
- Built: 1929
- Architect: Blackall, Clapp & Whittemore
- Architectural style: Classical Revival
- NRHP reference No.: 89000220
- Added to NRHP: April 7, 1989

The Phoenix Building is a historic commercial building located at 315–321 Union Street in Rockland, Massachusetts.

== Description and history ==
It was built in 1929, and was designed by the Boston firm of Blackall, Clapp & Whittemore in the Classical Revival style. The building's facade is finished predominantly in cast ashlar stone, with copper pilasters separating the storefronts. It is one of Rockland's few surviving late-19th and early-20th century commercial buildings.

The building was added to the National Register of Historic Places on April 7, 1989.

== See also ==
- National Register of Historic Places listings in Plymouth County, Massachusetts
