= Grundmann Studios =

Former artist studio building in Boston, Massachusetts

Coordinates: 42°20′58″N 71°04′29″W

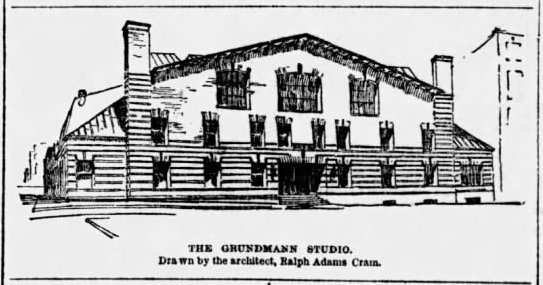
Grundmann Studios, 1894

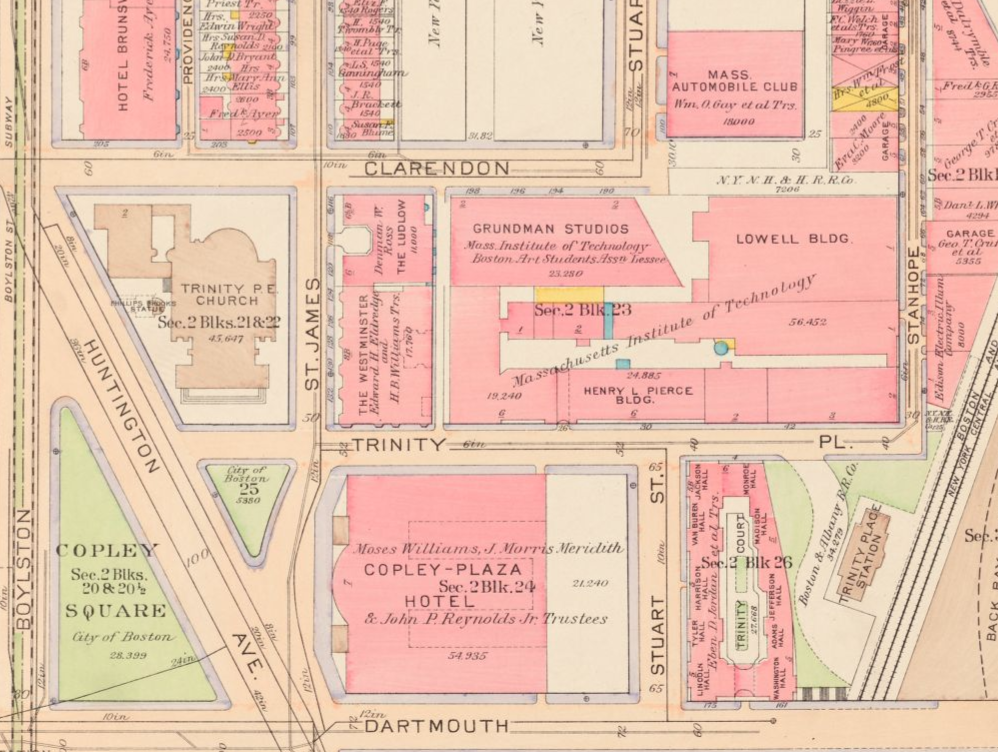
Location in Copley Square.

Grundmann Studios (1893–1917) in Boston, Massachusetts, was a building on Clarendon Street in the Back Bay. It contained artist's workspaces and multipurpose function rooms Copley Hall and Allston Hall. Prior to 1893, it functioned as a skating rink. (Note: Winslow's Rink hosted roller polo games and other entertainments.) After the Boston Art Students' Association leased the building it was renamed in honor of local art educator Emil Otto Grundmann. The Massachusetts Institute of Technology, whose campus was adjacent, owned the property.

Tenants included the Copley Society (formerly Boston Art Students' Association); artists Henry R. Blaney, Herman Dudley Murphy, Frank Richmond, Mary Bradish Titcomb; sculptor John A. Wilson, architect Josephine Wright Chapman; and the College Club.

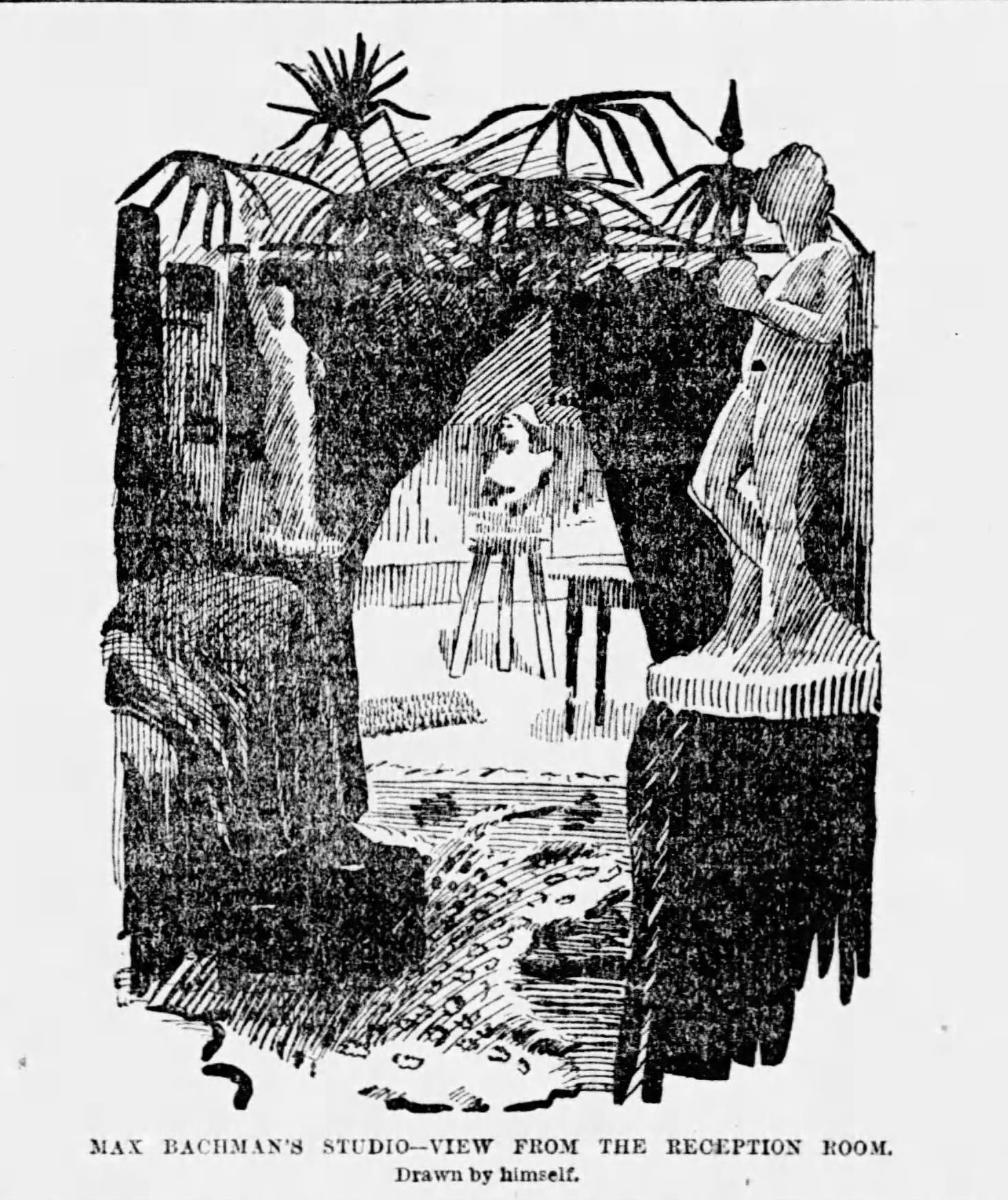
Sculptor Max Bachmann's studio

Ralph Adams Cram, architect and member of BASA, was charged with remodeling the interior. The first floor included club rooms—library, parlor, smoking room and life class room—and two large halls, each lit with "an immense skylight or glass roof". The larger room, Copley Hall, could seat up to eight hundred people and was used for lectures, concerts, dancing parties and art exhibitions. The smaller Allston Hall was designed for use as a picture gallery or supper room. It was connected by dumbwaiter to the basement kitchen. The second floor contained thirty-four suites of one, two, or three rooms, described as "so delightfully picturesque, with little, overhanging galleries, which are reached by the tiniest flight of stairs, it seems like climbing into a doll's house."

The building was demolished in 1917 to allow for the extension of Stuart Street, part of the "broad highway" civic improvement project.

== Events in Copley Hall ==
=== 1890s ===
- Artists Festival, 1894
- Art exhibition to benefit Boston Art Students' Association
- American Arts and Crafts Exhibition
- Daughters of the Revolution of the Commonwealth of Massachusetts exhibit
- Artists' Festival, 1898
- John Singer Sargent exhibit

=== 1900s ===
- Artists Festival, 1900
- Boston Orchestral Club concert
- Museum of Fine Arts, School of Drawing and Painting, 25th annual exhibit
- James Abbott McNeill Whistler exhibit
- Monet exhibition
- Artists' Festival, 1907
- Bela Pratt exhibit
- Yamanaka & Company Exhibition and auction of Japanese and Chinese fine art, November 6–8, 1902.

=== 1910s ===
- Spanish art exhibit
- International Exhibition of Modern Art
- Portrait exhibit
- Bertha A. Grover exhibit
- "Farewell" exhibition (1917)

== Images ==
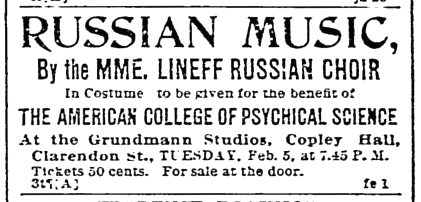
Advertisement, Mme. Lineff Russian Choir, Copley Hall, 1895

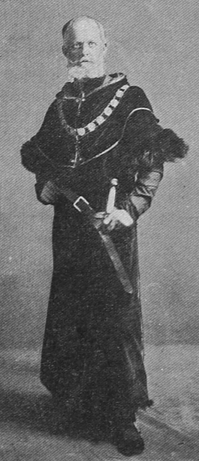
Artists' Festival attendee in costume, Copley Hall, 1898

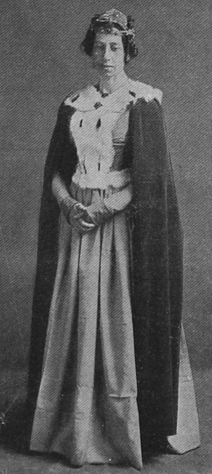
Artists' Festival attendee in costume, Copley Hall, 1898

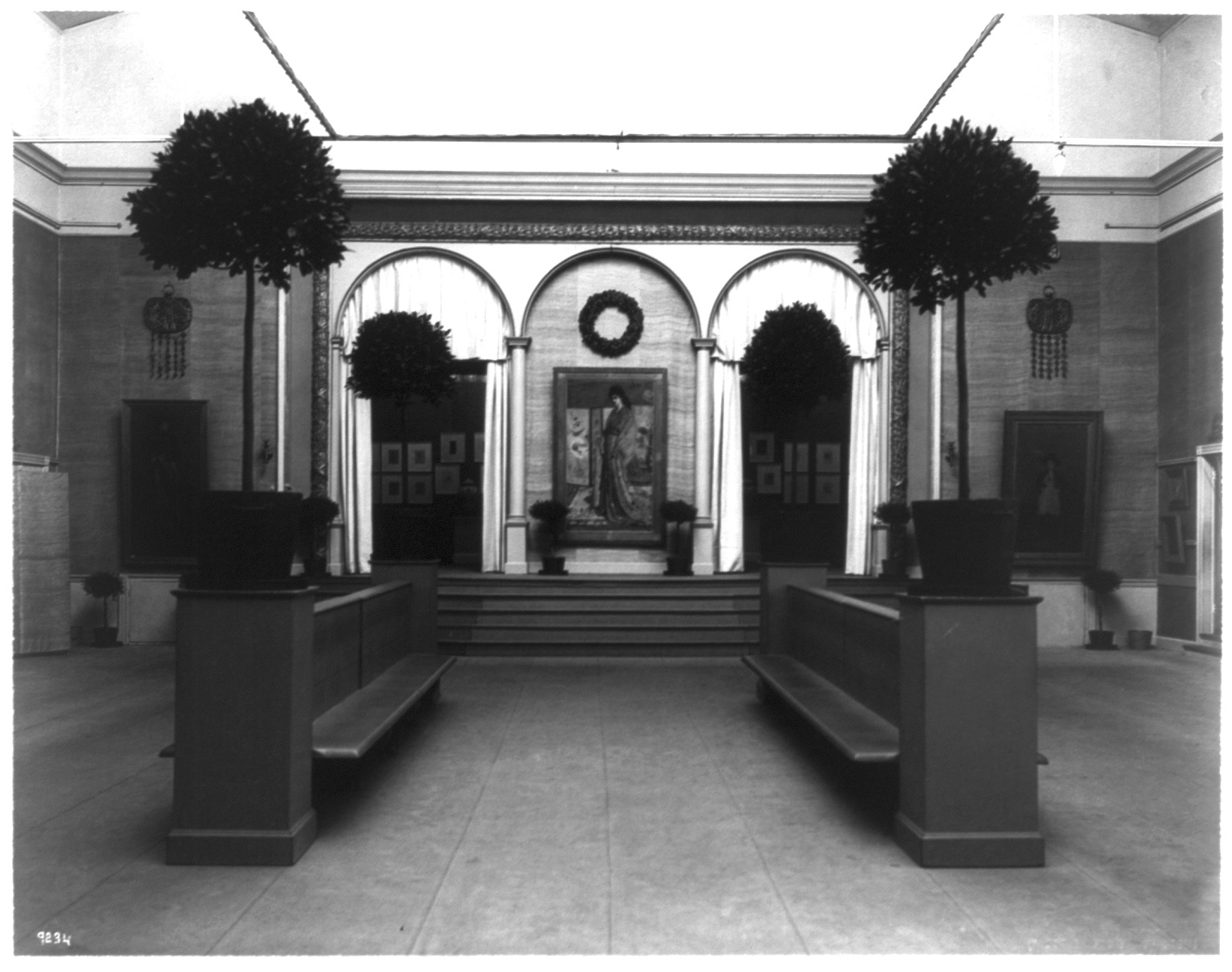
Exhibit of J.M. Whistler, Copley Hall, 1904

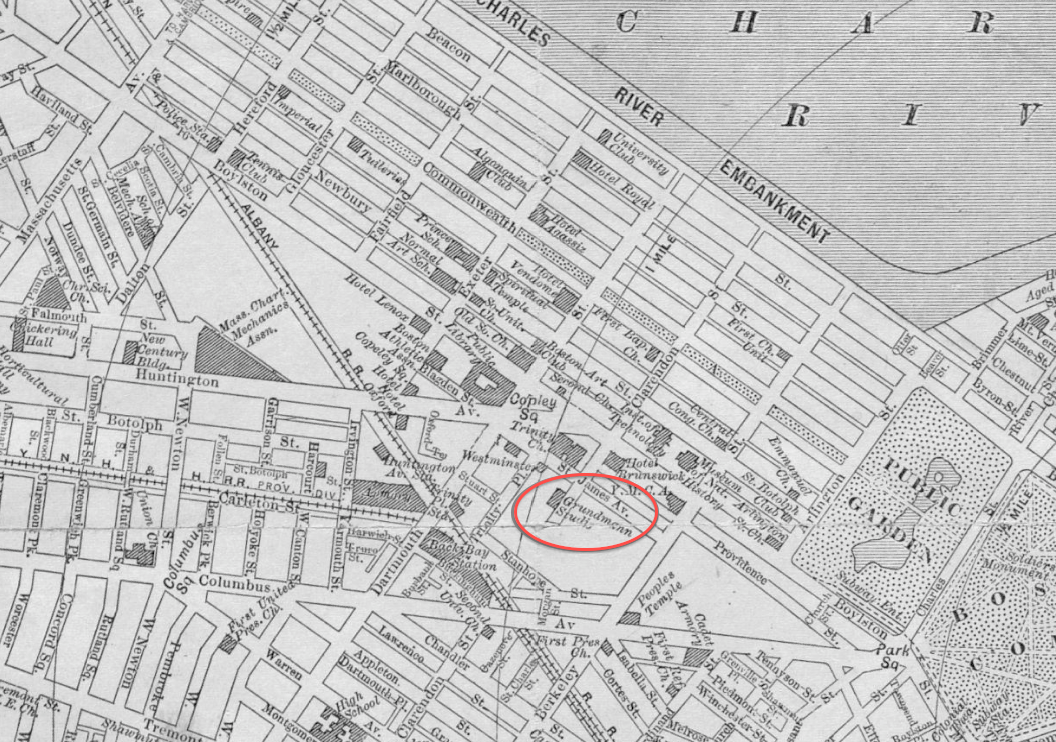
Detail of map of Boston in 1911, showing Grundmann Studios near Copley Square

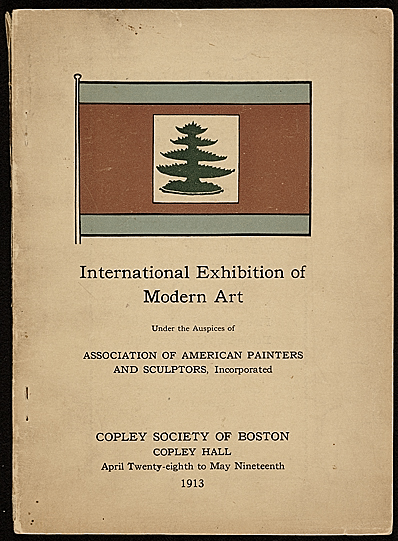
Catalog, Modern Art exhibit, 1913
