= Nashoba Publishing =

Weekly newspaper company in Boston, Massachusetts

Nashoba Publishing is a weekly newspaper company in the far northwest suburbs of Boston, Massachusetts. It is operated by MediaNews Group in common with sister papers the Lowell Sun and Sentinel & Enterprise. It previously published several newspapers which were eventually merged into one, the Nashoba Valley Voice, in 2015.

== Sisters and competitors ==
The family that formerly owned Nashoba, headed by publisher Frank J. Hartnett Sr., sold the chain in 2000, for an undisclosed amount of money. Two years later, MediaNews opened a new plant in Devens, Massachusetts, in the middle of Nashoba's coverage area, to print Nashoba's weeklies, The Lowell Sun, and the Sentinel & Enterprise.

Nashoba newspapers' primary competitors are their sister dailies in Fitchburg and Lowell. Additionally, in Harvard, the company competes with an independent weekly, The Harvard Press; and in Ayer, Devens, Harvard and Shirley with the daily Worcester Telegram & Gazette.

== Newspapers ==
Nashoba's newsroom is operated at the Devens printing plant. Titles previously published by Nashoba Publishing in the past included:

Newspaper	Notes	Website (archived)
The Ayer Public Spirit	Covering Ayer; founded in 1869	
Groton Landmark	Covering Groton	
Harvard Hillside	Covering Harvard	
Nashoba Valley Chronicle	Regional news section in Ayer, Groton, Pepperell, Shirley, Townsend	
Pepperell Free Press	Covering Pepperell	
Shirley Oracle	Covering Shirley; founded in 1869	
Townsend Times	Covering Townsend	

In 2015, the newspapers published by Nashoba Publishing were merged into a new regional newspaper, the Nashoba Valley Voice.

Newspaper	Notes	Website
Nashoba Valley Voice	Covering the entire region, created in 2015	
