= Tuckerman Hall =

- U.S. Historic district – Contributing property
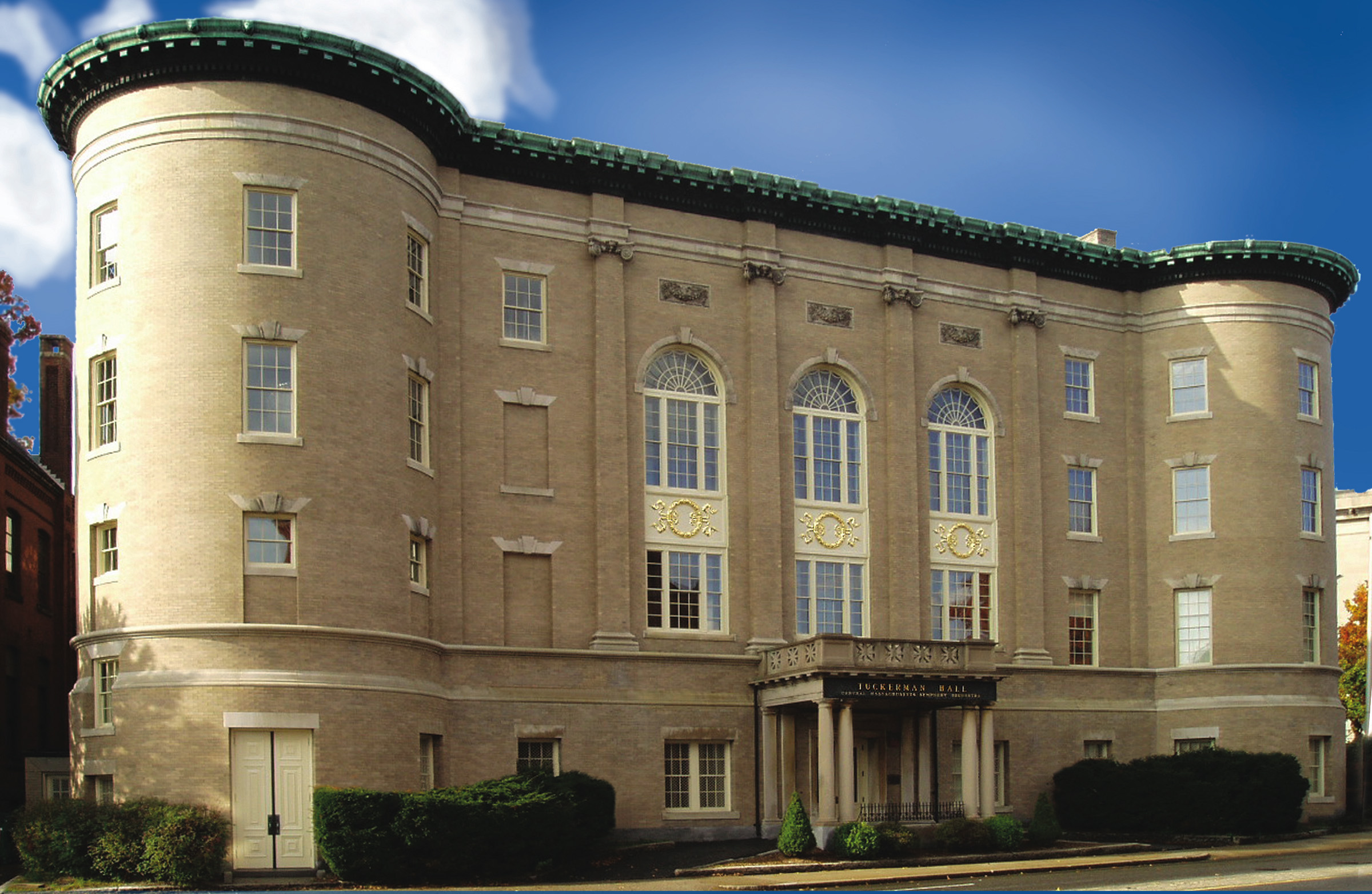

- Location within Massachusetts Location within the United States
- Location: Worcester, MA
- Coordinates: 42°16′23.7″N 71°48′4.6″W
- Built: 1902
- Architect: Josephine Wright Chapman
- Architectural style: Neoclassical
- Part of: Institutional District (ID80000554)

Tuckerman Hall is a concert hall in Worcester, Massachusetts. It was built in 1902 in the Neoclassical style and restored in 1999. The architect was Josephine Wright Chapman. It is the home of the Massachusetts Symphony Orchestra.

Other current uses include weddings, receptions and other events.

== History ==
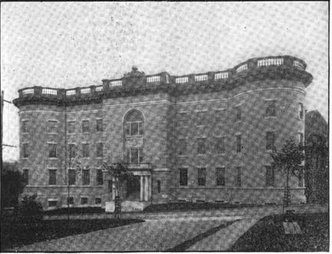
Worcester Woman's Club ca. 1902

The building was built for the use of the Worcester Woman's Club in 1902. It is named after Elizabeth Tuckerman, the grandmother of Stephen Salisbury III, who donated the land, which was left over from his donation to the Worcester Art Museum nearby.

On March 3, 1980 Tuckerman Hall was listed in the National Register of Historic Places within the Institutional District at the local significance level.

On October 4, 2000 Tuckerman Hall was declared an Official Project of Save America's Treasures.

== See also ==
- 1930 concert at Tuckerman Hall
