= Lowell Sun Building =

Skyscraper in Lowell, Massachusetts

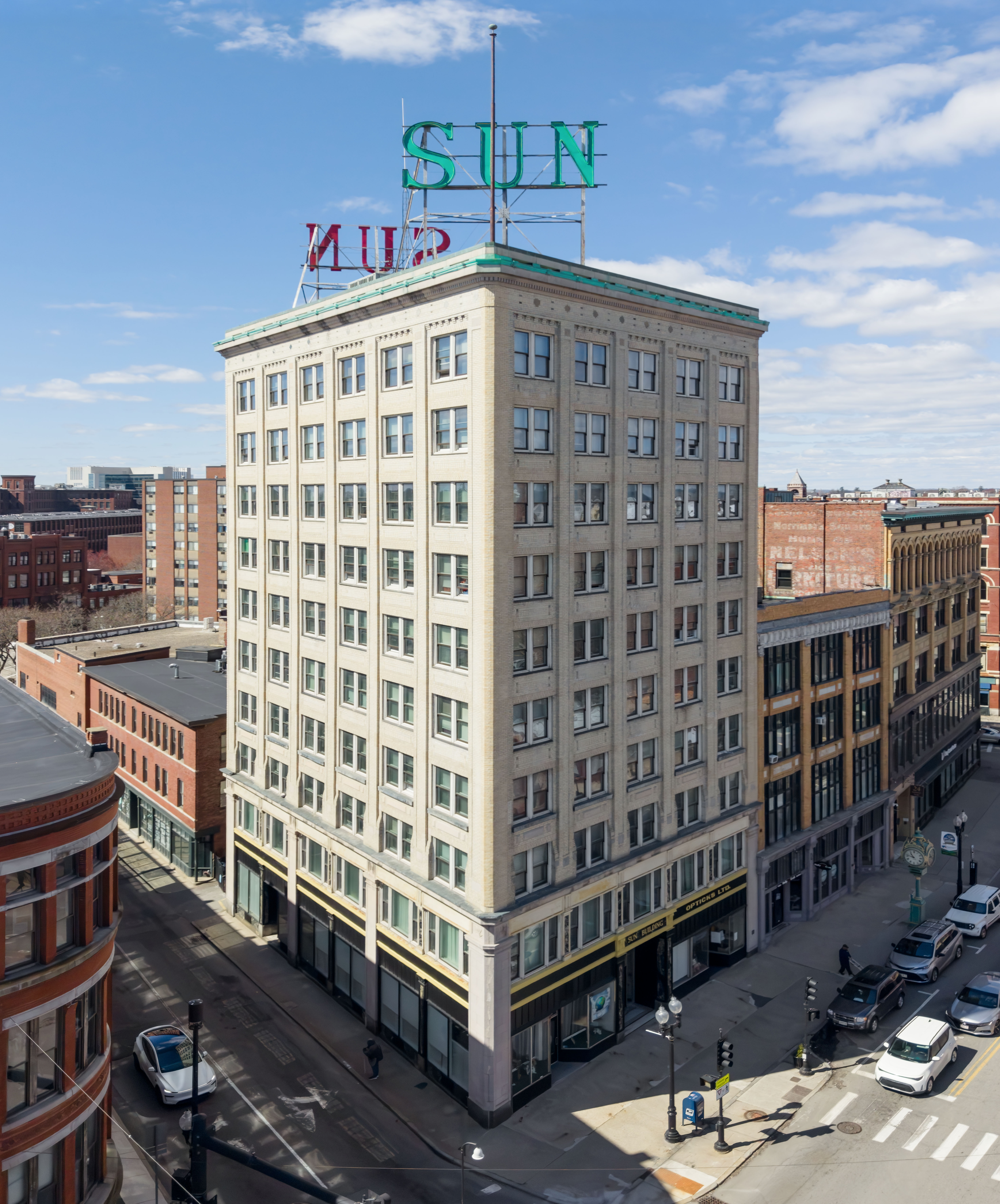
Lowell Sun Building in 2026

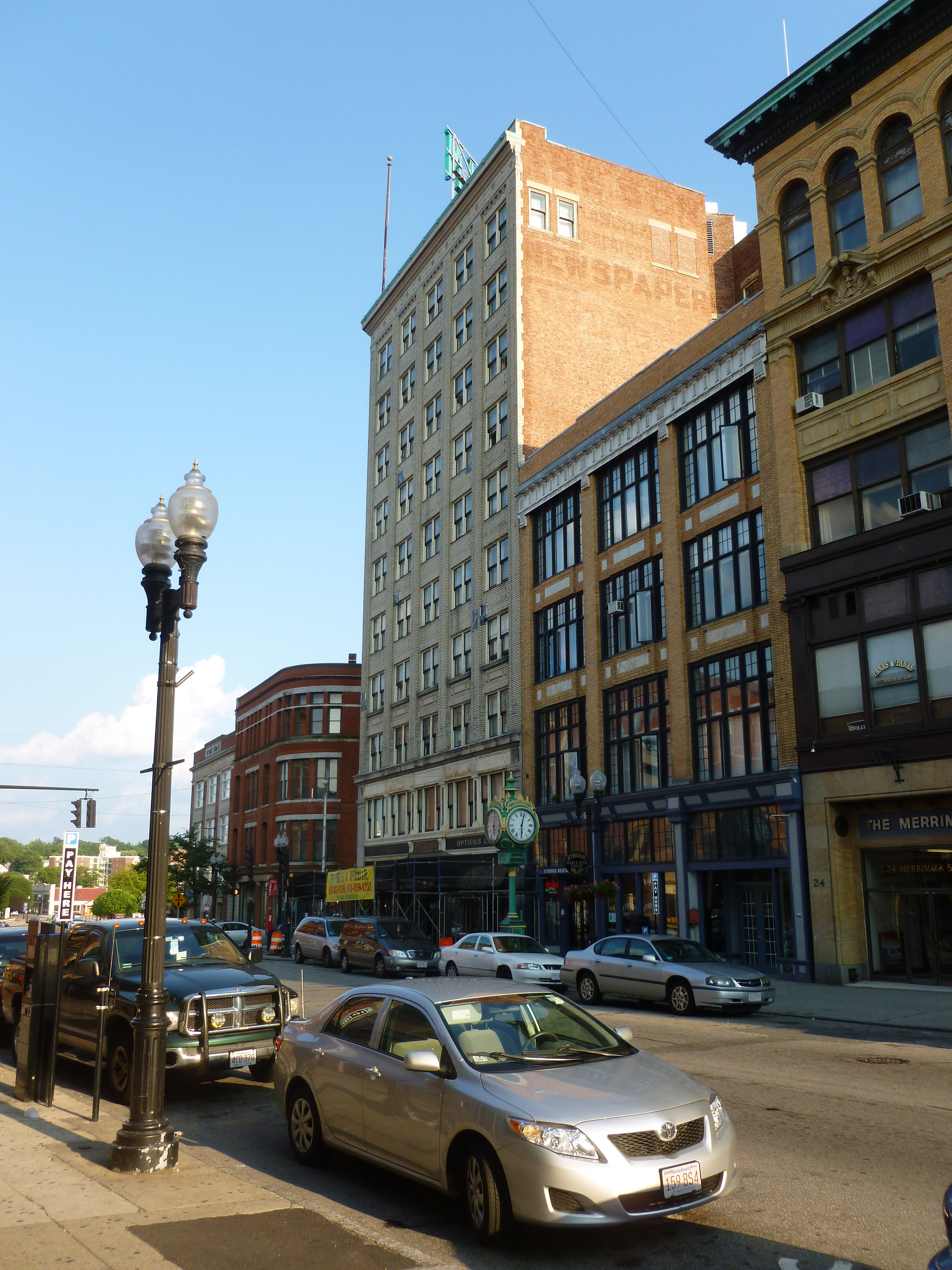
The Lowell Sun Building from the ground.

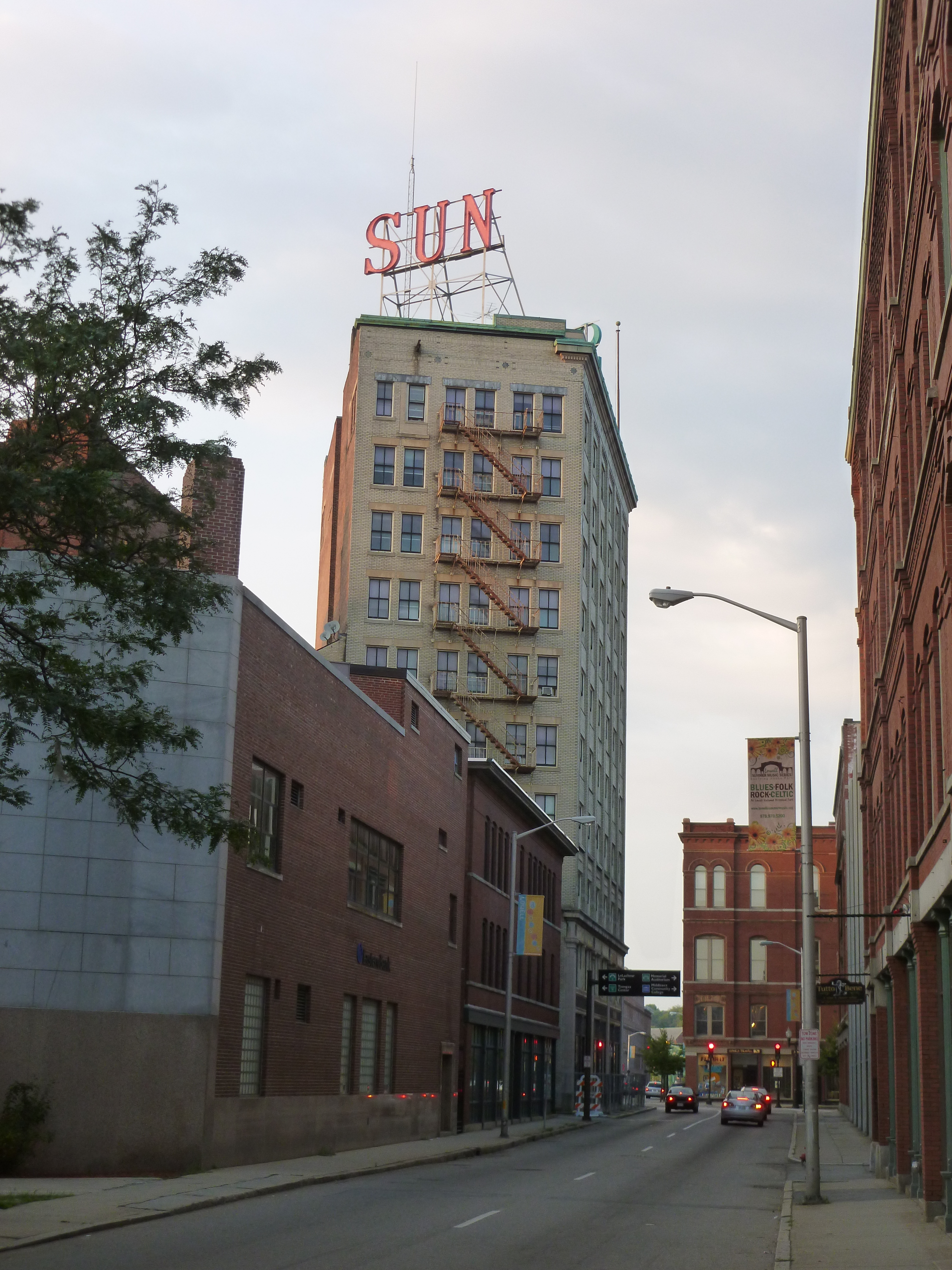

The Lowell Sun Building is an early "skyscraper" in Lowell, Massachusetts. The steel frame and reinforced concrete building was designed by architect Clarence Blackall of Boston and built from 1912 to 1914.

It was built for Lowell's newspaper The Sun and replaced a red brick Greek revival building the paper had used elsewhere in Lowell. The paper's operations moved elsewhere in the 1960s

Artworks by John Ingersoll Coggeshall were commissioned for the building.

Blackall's firm, Blackall, Clapp and Whittemore, designed the Lowell Memorial Auditorium built in 1922 as well as tall for the time commercial buildings in Boston and many theaters in Boston. John H. Harrington owned the earlier Sun building and rented out space in it. He was captured in photographs posing the older building.

A weather station and large neon letters spelling SUN were added atop the building in the 1930s.

The building is now senior housing and the neon in the letters has been replaced by LEDs.

== See also ==
- National Register of Historic Places listings in Lowell, Massachusetts
