= Winthrop Building =

Building in Boston, Massachusetts

- U.S. National Register of Historic Places
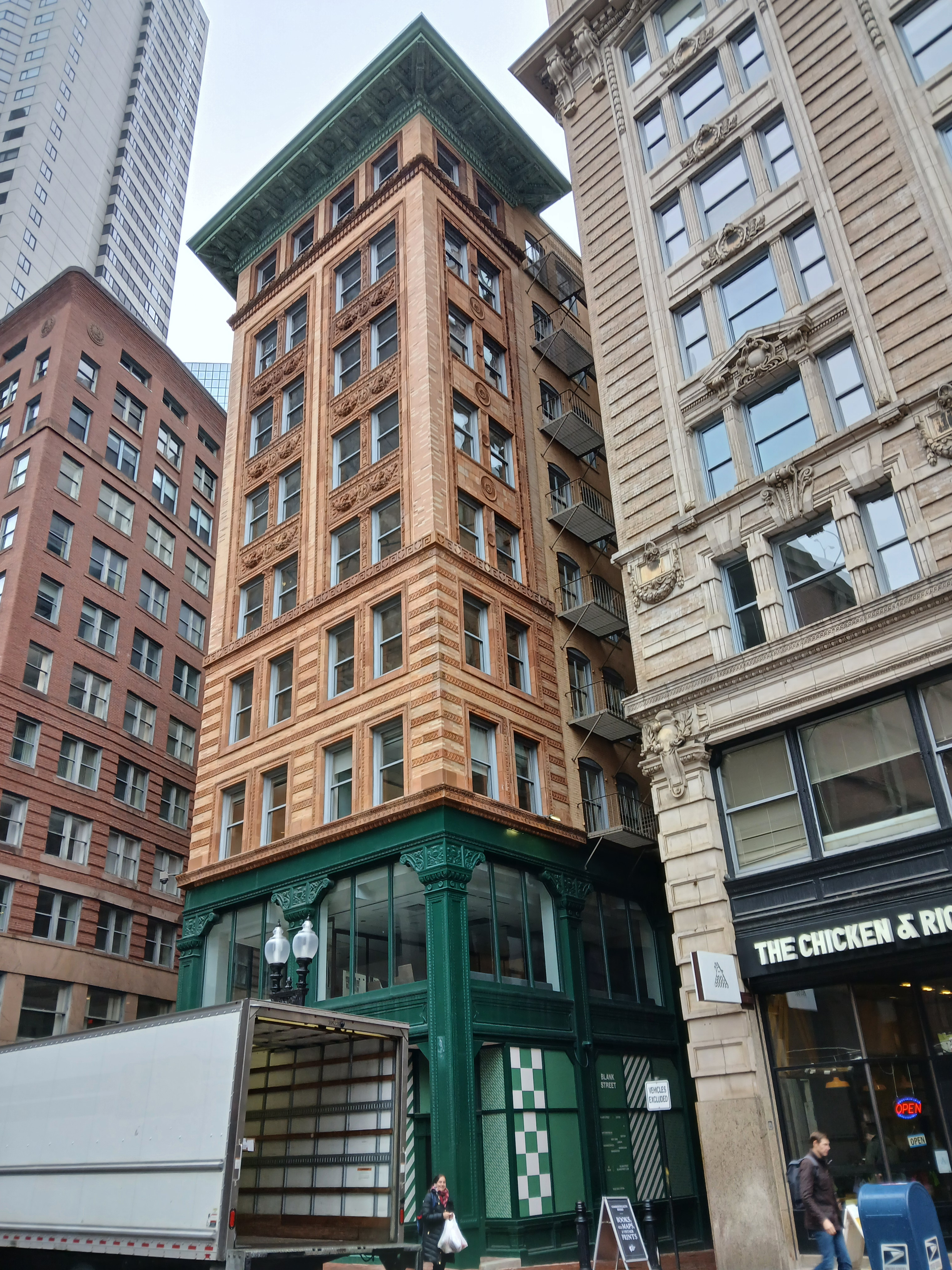

- Location within Boston Location within Massachusetts Location within the United States
- Location: Boston, Massachusetts
- Coordinates: 42°21′27″N 71°3′29″W
- Built: 1894
- Built by: Woodbury & Leighton
- Architect: Blackall & Newton
- Architectural style: Second Renaissance Revival
- NRHP reference No.: 74000392
- Added to NRHP: April 18, 1974

The Winthrop Building (also known as the Winthrop-Carter Building) is an early skyscraper at 7 Water Street (intersection with Washington Street) in Boston, Massachusetts.

The nine-story brick-and-terracotta building was designed by Clarence H. Blackall in the Renaissance Revival style, and has the distinction of being the first skyscraper in the city to have been constructed with a steel frame. Completed in 1894, it was originally known as the Carter Building, but was renamed the Winthrop Building in 1899 after the Puritan Governor John Winthrop, whose second house was located adjacent to the site. Prominent past tenants include Landscape Architect Fletcher Steele in the 1920s and the Boston offices of the Associated Press.

The building was added to the National Register of Historic Places in 1974, and was designated a Boston Landmark by the Boston Landmarks Commission in 2016.

== Gallery ==
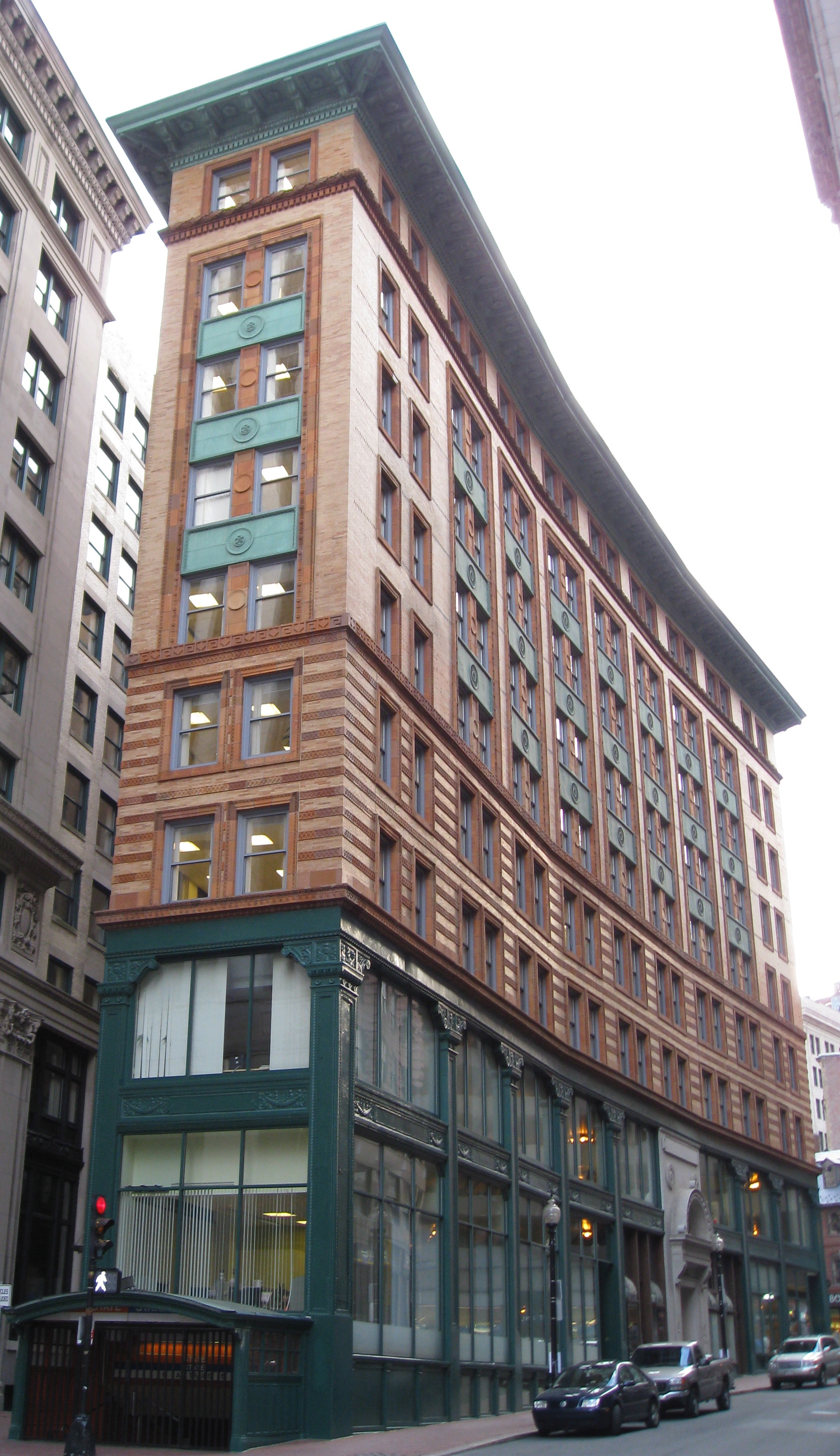

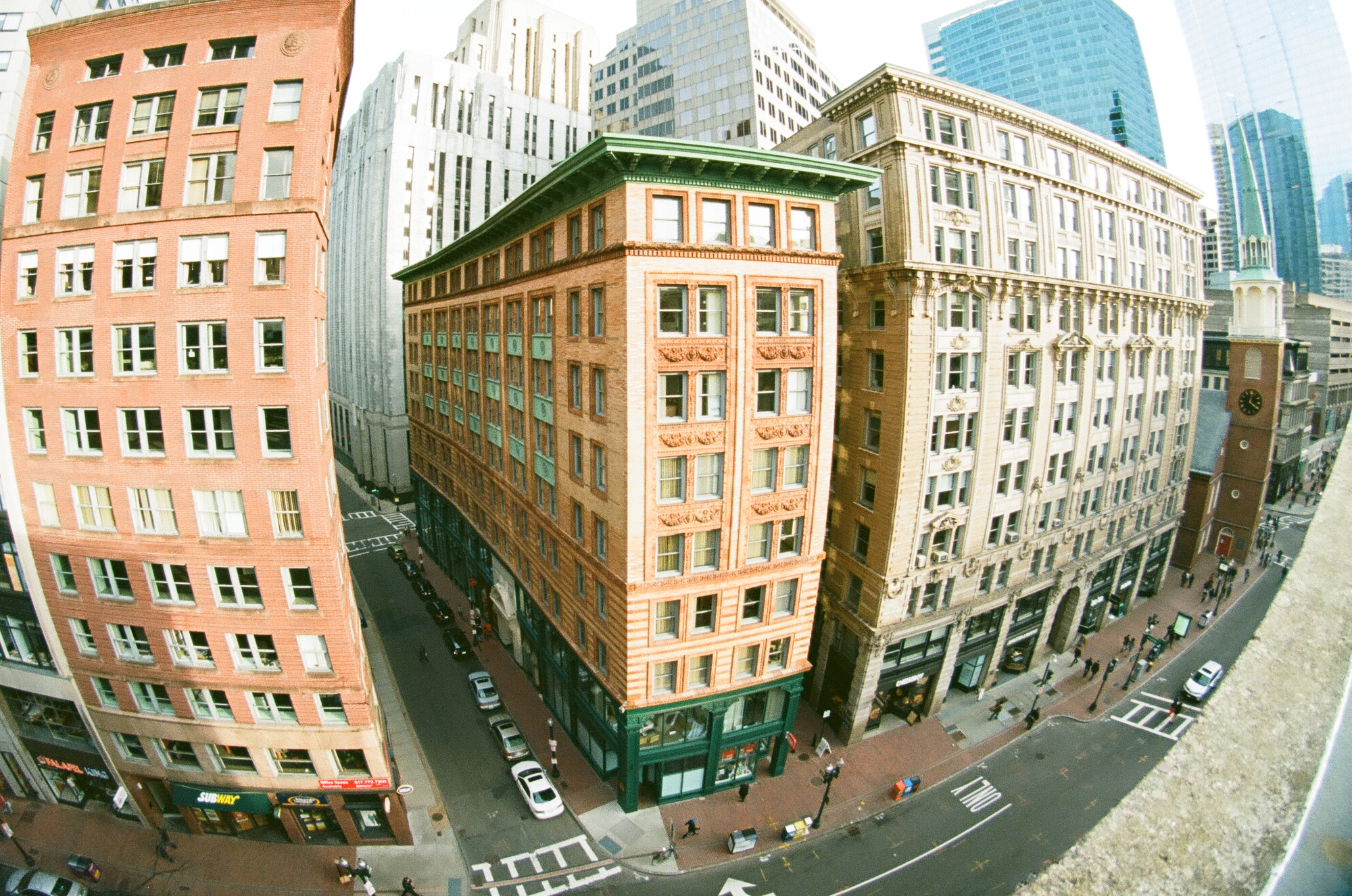

== See also ==
- National Register of Historic Places listings in northern Boston, Massachusetts
