= Clarence H. Blackall =

American architect (1857–1942)

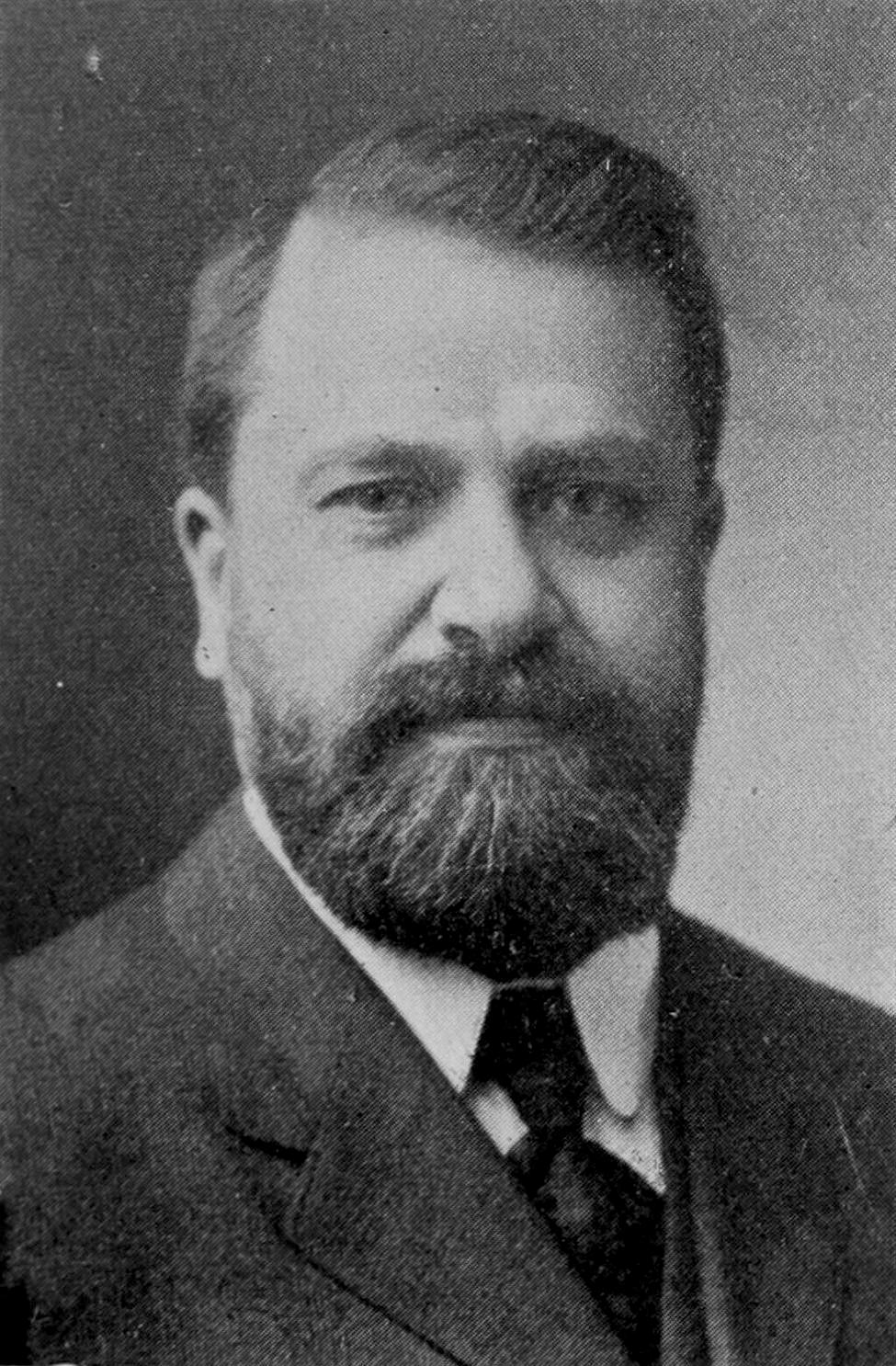
- Blackall c. 1910
- Born: Clarence Howard Blackall; February 3, 1857; Brooklyn, New York, US
- Died: March 5, 1942 (aged 85); Concord, Massachusetts
- Education: University of Illinois School of Architecture (BS)
- Occupation: Architect

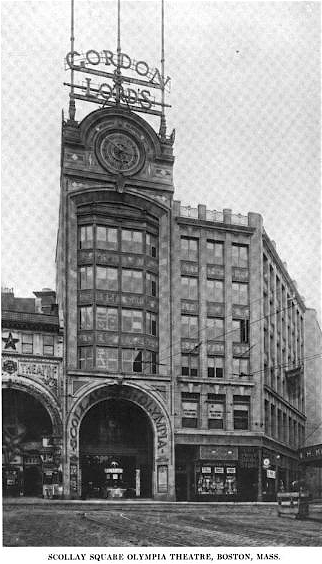
Olympia Theatre, Scollay Square, Boston, ca.1915

Clarence Howard Blackall (February 3, 1857 – March 5, 1942) was an American architect who is estimated to have designed 300 theatres.

== Life and career ==
Blackall was born in Brooklyn, New York, in 1857. He attended college at the University of Illinois School of Architecture, graduating with a B.S. in 1877, and received training at the École nationale supérieure des Beaux-Arts in Paris. He arrived in Boston, Massachusetts in 1882, where he was recognized for both his architectural innovations and his designs of significant Boston landmarks including the Colonial Theatre, Wilbur Theatre, Modern and Metropolitan (now the Wang Center for Performing Arts) theatres.

Blackall was a senior member of the Boston architectural firm Blackall, Clapp and Whittemore, and in 1889 he helped establish the Boston Architectural College as a club for local architects and as a training program for draftsman.

He designed the 1894 Carter Winthrop Building, which was the first steel frame structure in the city of Boston. In addition to its innovative technology, the structure also used terra cotta trim and featured a dramatic, deep, and overhanging cornice. Blackall is also credited with designing the Copley Plaza Hotel, the Foellinger Auditorium (1907) on the University of Illinois campus, as well as the Little Building (1917) at Emerson College on the site of the Pelham Hotel (1857), the "first apartment house in any city along the Atlantic seaboard of the United States" according to architectural historian Walter Muir Whitehill. Blackall also designed Lowell, Massachusetts' first steel frame building, the ten story Lowell Sun Building (1912-1914).

Opened in 1908 and designed by Blackall, the Gaiety Theatre was one of the only theatres in New England that would allow African Americans to perform vaudeville. It was also the first of Blackall's theatres to use a large steel girder to support the balcony, eliminating the need for architectural columns. Blackall was also responsible for Nathan H. Gordon's Olympia Theatre design, which opened as a film and vaudeville theatre on May 6, 1912.

Blackall died in Concord, Massachusetts on March 5, 1942.

== Notable works ==
- Bowdoin Square Theatre, One Bowdoin Square, Boston MA; opened February 1892; demolished 1955
- Castle Square Theatre, 421 Tremont St., Boston MA; opened 1894; demolished December 1932-January 1933
- Tremont Temple, 88 Tremont St., Boston MA; opened May 1896
- Colonial Theatre, 100-106 Boylston St., Boston MA; 1653 seats; opened 20 December 1900
- Park Theatre (later the State), 619-621 Washington St., Boston MA; 1184 seats; remodeled by Blackall in 1903; demolished in 1990
- Unique Theatre, 700 Washington St, Roxbury MA; opened in 1907
- Pastime Theatre, 581 Washington St., Boston MA; opened 1 February 1908; demolished circa 1914
- Gaiety Theatre (later the Publix), 661 Washington St., Boston MA; 1049 seats; opened 20 June 1908; demolished 2005
- Casino Theatre (a.k.a. Waldron's Casino), 44 Hanover St. at Scollay Square, Boston MA; 1300 seats; opened April 1909; demolished 1962
- Soldiers and Sailors Monument, Syracuse, New York, dedicated 1910
- National Theatre, 535 Tremont St., Boston MA; 3500 seats; opened 1911; demolished 1997
- Plymouth Theatre (later the Gary Cinema), 125 Eliot St. (later renamed Stuart St.), Boston MA; 1464 seats; opened 16 October 1911; demolished 1978
- Eagle Theatre, 2227 Washington St., Roxbury MA; opened 1912
- Gordon's Olympia Theatre (later the Pilgrim), 658 Washington St., Boston MA; 1892 seats; opened 6 May 1912; demolished 1996
- Modern Theatre, 523 Washington St., Boston MA; opened 1913
- Cort Theatre (later the Park Square, then the Selwyn), Park Square, Boston MA; 1200 seats; opened 1913; demolished
- Beacon Theatre (later the Beacon Hill), 47-53 Tremont St., Boston MA; 500 seats; opened 1913; demolished 1970
- Gordon's Scollay Square Olympia Theatre, 56 Scollay Square (4 Tremont Row), Boston MA; 2538 seats; opened 17 November 1913; demolished 1962
- Lowell Sun Building, Kearney Square, Lowell MA; 1912-1914
- Ye Wilbur Theatre, 250-252 Tremont St., Boston MA; 1227 seats; opened April 1914
- Broadway Theatre, 420 W. Broadway, South Boston MA; 1777 seats; opened 1920
- Criterion Theatre, 1122 Columbus Ave., Roxbury MA; 749 seats; opened 1921; demolished in the 1960s
- Jamaica Theatre, 413 Centre St, Jamaica Plain MA; 1938 seats; opened 1922; demolished in the 1960s
- Capitol Theatre, Tremont St., Boston MA; opened 1924
- Metropolitan Theatre (later the Music Hall, then the Wang), Tremont St., Boston MA; 4407 seats; opened 26 October 1925
- Temple Ohabei Shalom, a synagogue, Beacon Street, Brookline, MA; 1927
- Phoenix Building, Union St., Rockland, MA; 1929
