= The Sun (Lowell) =

Daily newspaper based in Lowell, Massachusetts

- The November 5, 2008 front page of The Sun
- Type: Daily newspaper
- Format: Broadsheet
- Owner: Digital First Media/Alden Global Capital
- Publisher: Kevin Corrado
- Editor: Bruce Castleberry
- Founded: August 10, 1878, as Lowell Weekly Sun
- Headquarters: 491 Dutton Street, Lowell, Massachusetts 01854 United States
- Circulation: 42,899 Daily; 47,897 Sunday (as of 2011)
- Website: lowellsun.com

The Sun, also known as The Lowell Sun, is a daily newspaper based in Lowell, Massachusetts, United States, serving towns in Massachusetts around the Greater Lowell area and beyond. As of 2011, its average daily circulation was about 42,900 copies. It is owned by MediaNews Group of Colorado, which is owned by the hedge fund Alden Global Capital.

== The Sun ==
The newspaper's headquarters are in the first floor of the former American Textile History Museum building in downtown Lowell. Before March 18, 2007, the newspaper occupied a succession of offices on Kearney Square, about half a mile away. One of the old news buildings, locally called "the Sunscraper," is a landmark high-rise topped with a huge neon "Sun" sign. The paper's most recent former home is across the street.

The paper's editorials have, for decades, espoused a conservative bent in a city and state where Democratic voters overwhelm Republicans. In the 1970s, editor and firebrand Clement Costello, who was known for walking around in a cape, wrote that the U.S. should annex Mexico and was credited with helping to ruin John Kerry's chances of winning the 5th Congressional District seat in 1972. In 2004, the newspaper again made waves when it endorsed President George W. Bush for re-election instead of Kerry, who was then the junior U.S. senator from Massachusetts.

== People ==
The Sun was once known beyond its circulation area as the home base of the late columnist Paul Sullivan, who until 2007 hosted a nighttime talk show on WBZ radio in Boston. Before the newspaper moved, he would regularly tout scoops from "Lowell's great newspaper at 15 Kearney Square."

One of the paper's most famous alumnus is Jack Kerouac, a Lowell native who worked as a sports reporter for The Sun before going on to greater fame as poet laureate to the Beat Generation.

Another Sun alumnus is Tom Squitieri, who won the Overseas Press Club Madeleine Dane Ross Award for his reporting on divided Cambodian refugee families living in Lowell and Thailand. The Lowell Sun is the smallest independent newspaper to have won an OPC award.

== History ==
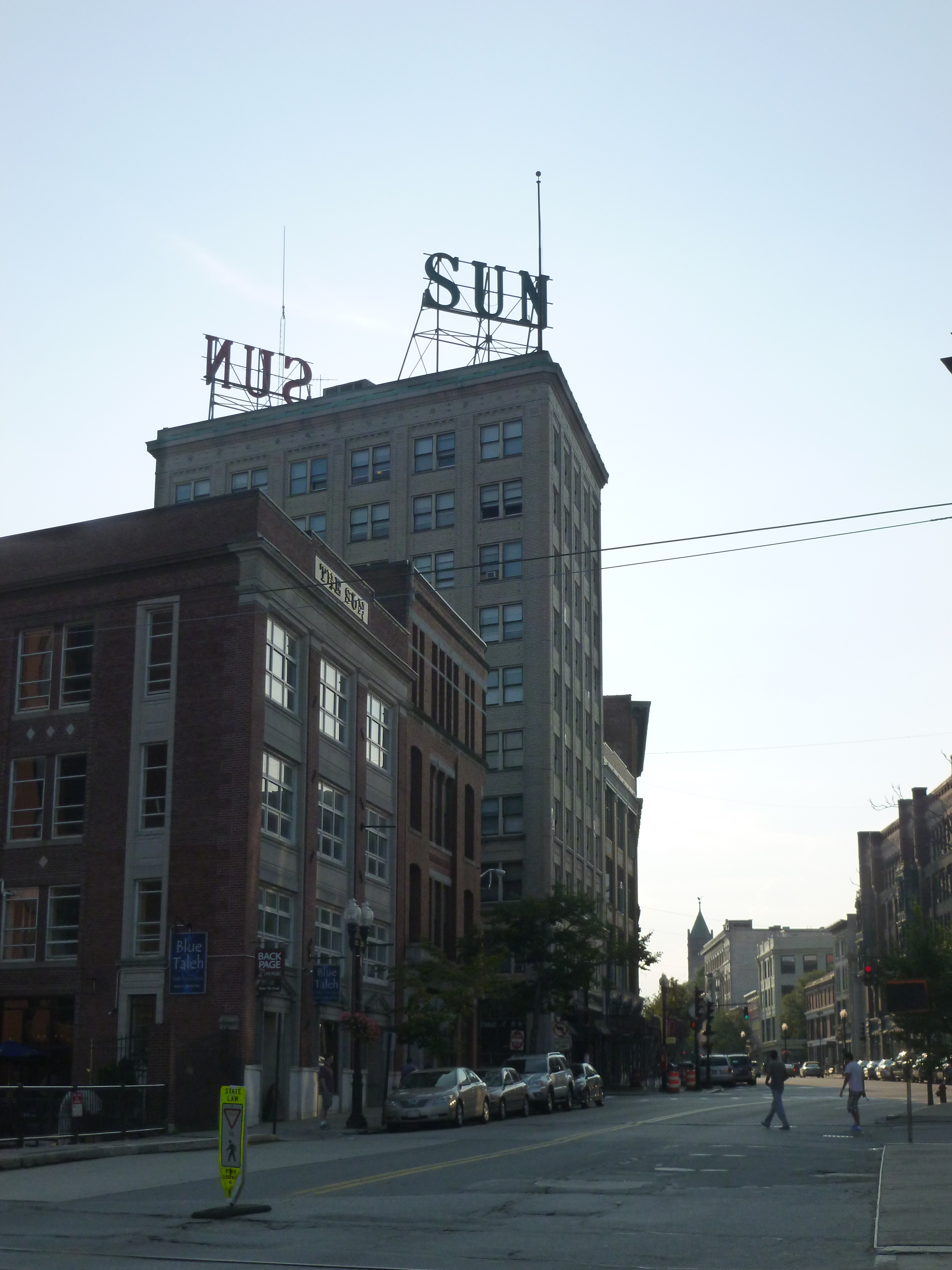
The former Lowell Sun Building, as viewed from East Merrimack Street. Lowell City Hall is visible in the background.

Print shop owners and brothers John and Daniel Harrington founded the paper as a weekly in 1878. In its earliest years, The Sun provided the growing Irish Catholic population a voice in a mill city that was run by wealthy Protestant factory owners. Over the years, the paper outlasted its competitors to become the only major newspaper in Lowell, converting to a daily in 1892 and buying out its last competitor daily, The Courier-Citizen, in 1941; a starting the Lowell Sunday Sun in 1949; and buying out its only Sunday competition, the Lowell Sunday Telegram, in 1952.

The paper remained in the hands of John Harrington's descendants—Thomas F. Costello, his sons John H. and Clement C. Costello, and grandson John H. Costello Jr. with a certain amount of drama and feuds—until it was purchased August 1, 1997, by MediaNews Group. The newspaper's circulation at the time was 52,234, daily, and 55,804, Sunday.

When he purchased the paper, MediaNews CEO William Dean Singleton noted that The Sun had "played a leading role in the development and growth of the Greater Lowell region," including downtown Lowell's rebirth and the establishment of minor-league baseball and hockey teams in the city.

Following MediaNews' purchase (through The Sun) of Nashoba Publications weeklies covering several towns between Lowell and Fitchburg, the company in 2002 consolidated printing for The Sun, Nashoba and the Fitchburg-based Sentinel & Enterprise' at a new US$7 million press plant in Devens, Massachusetts. The move was said to have a beneficial effect on traffic in downtown Fitchburg and Lowell.

== See also ==
- The Sun, other similarly named publications
