= Sentinel & Enterprise =

Newspaper in Fitchburg, Massachusetts

- Type: Daily newspaper
- Format: Broadsheet
- Owner: MediaNews Group
- Publisher: Mark O'Neil
- Editor: Charles St. Amand
- Advertising: Tim Brady
- Founded: December 20, 1838, as Fitchburg Sentinel
- Headquarters: 808 Main Street, Fitchburg, Massachusetts 01420, United States
- Circulation: 15,031 Daily; 17,119 Sunday (as of 2012)
- ISSN: 1049-1155
- Website: sentinelandenterprise.com

The Sentinel & Enterprise is a morning daily newspaper published in Fitchburg, Massachusetts, with a satellite news bureau in Leominster, Massachusetts. The newspaper covers local news in Fitchburg, Leominster and several nearby towns in northern Worcester County and northwest Middlesex County, Massachusetts. It is owned by MediaNews Group of Colorado., which is owned by the hedge fund Alden Global Capital.

The main competitors to the Sentinel & Enterprise are the county's largest daily, the Telegram & Gazette of Worcester; on the west, The Gardner News; and on the east, Nashoba Publishing weeklies and The Sun of Lowell, also owned by MediaNews.

== History ==
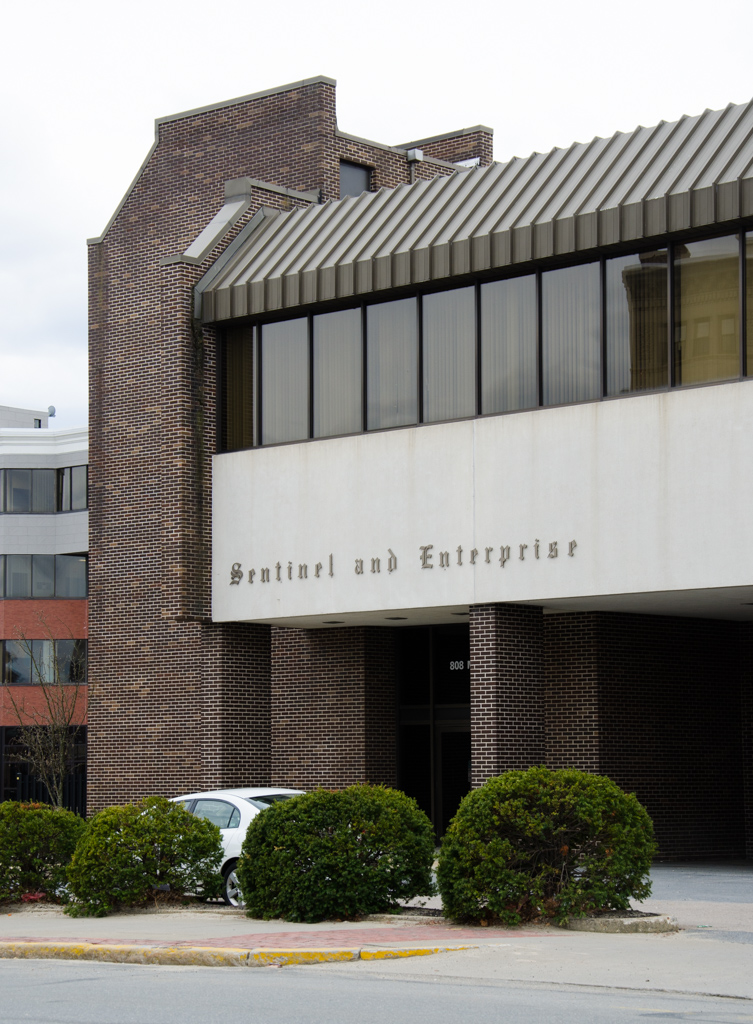
The exterior of the Sentinel & Enterprise building in Fitchburg, Massachusetts.

Formed in 1973 by the merger of two newspapers covering adjacent cities, the daily traces its lineage back to the Fitchburg Sentinel (founded 1838) and Leominster Enterprise (1873).

In the 1970s, the paper was known as the Fitchburg-Leominster Sentinel & Enterprise, and published only six days a week, Monday through Saturday, in the afternoon. In the later years of this arrangement, the Saturday paper was published in the morning and called the "weekend edition." In 1990, the Sentinel & Enterprise debuted a Sunday morning edition. The weekday papers remained afternoon publications.

By 1997, the Sentinel & Enterprise had switched to seven-day morning publication. Its longtime owner, Thomson Corporation, as part of a nationwide divestment of small-market newspapers, sold the Fitchburg paper to MediaNews. No price was released in the transaction between two private companies. Average circulation was given at the time of sale as 19,640, daily, and 20,087 on Sunday.

Following MediaNews' purchase of The Sun and Nashoba Publications weeklies covering several towns between Lowell and Leominster, the company consolidated printing in 2002 for all of these properties at a new $7 million press plant in Devens, Massachusetts. The move was said to have a beneficial effect on traffic in downtown Fitchburg and Lowell.
