= Frost, Briggs & Chamberlain =

Practice information
- Founders: Howard Frost; Lucius W. Briggs; C. Leslie Chamberlain
- Founded: 1899
- Location: Worcester, Massachusetts

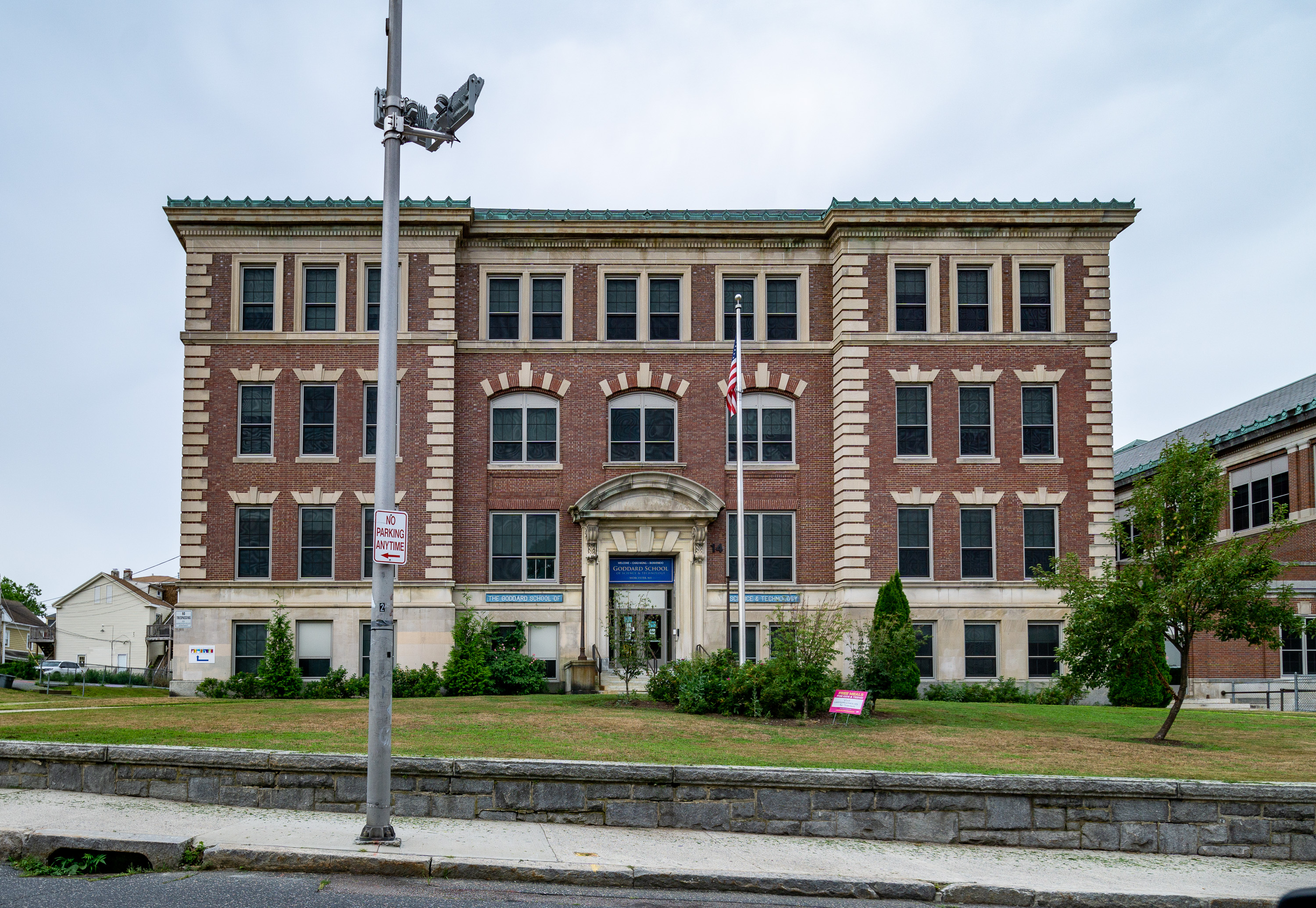
The former South High School in Worcester, designed by Frost, Briggs & Chamberlain in the Neoclassical style and completed in 1901.

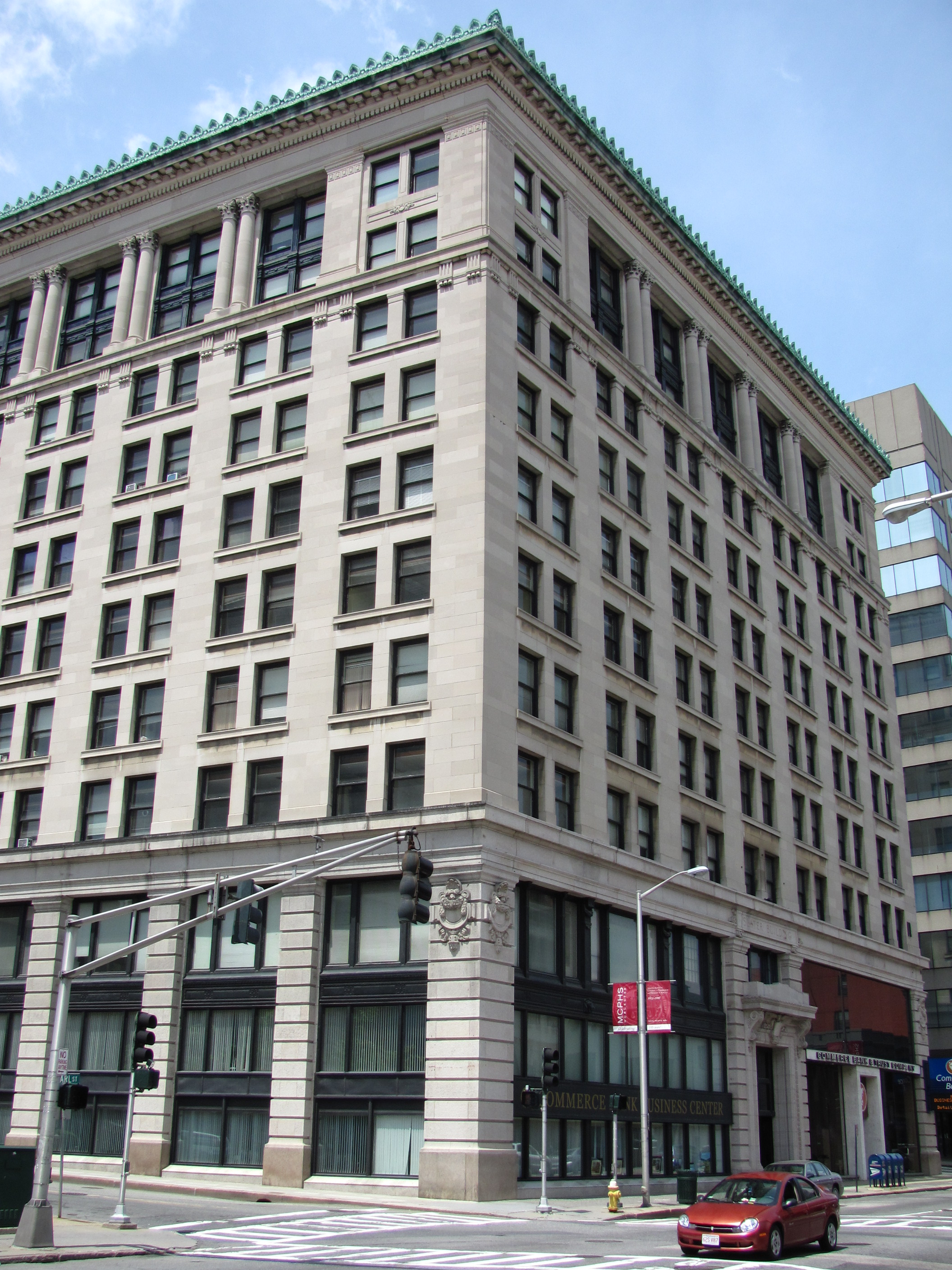
The Slater Building in Worcester, designed by Frost, Briggs & Chamberlain in the Neoclassical style and completed in 1907.

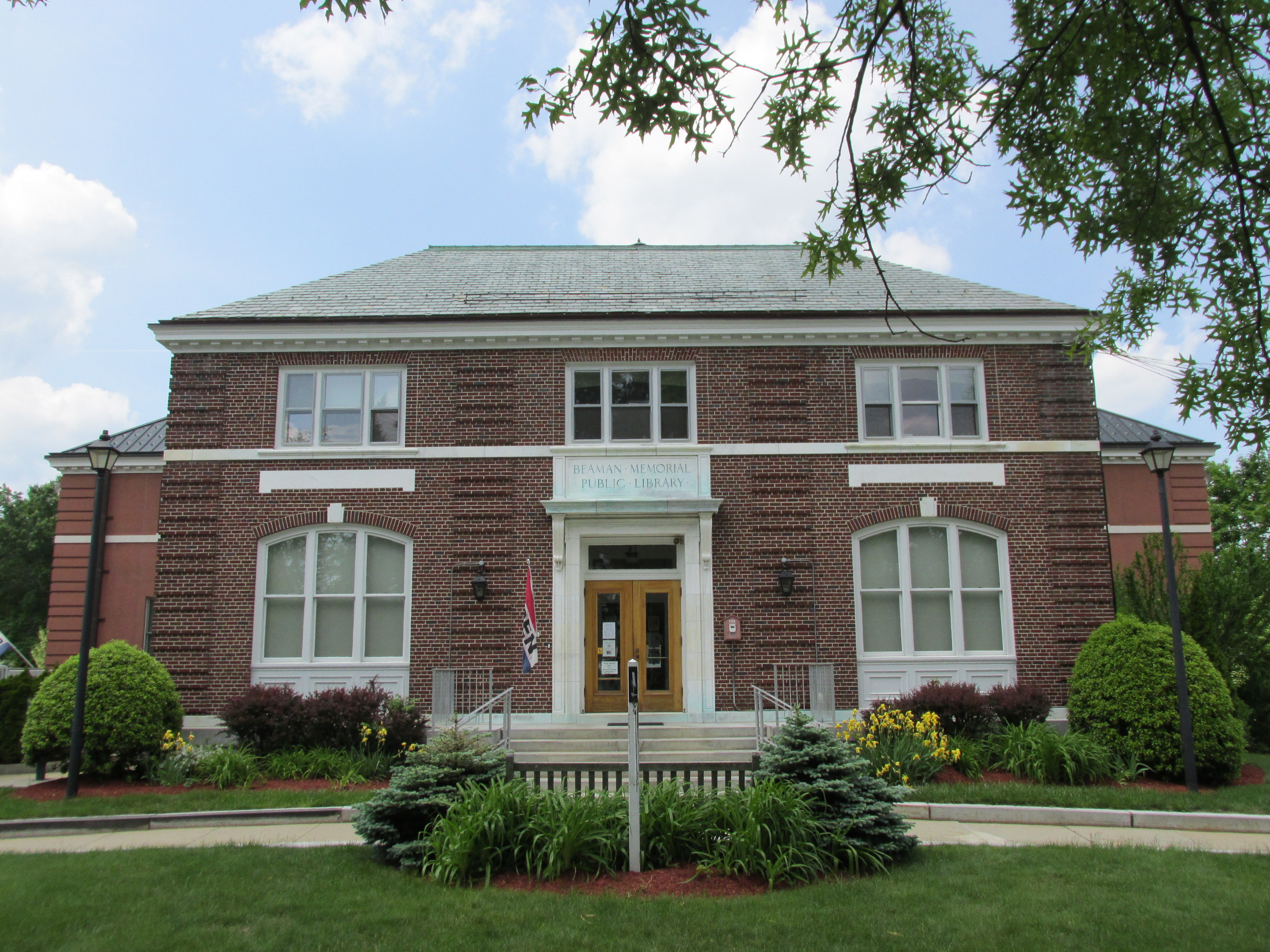
The former Beaman Memorial Public Library, designed by Frost, Briggs & Chamberlain in the Colonial Revival style and completed in 1912.

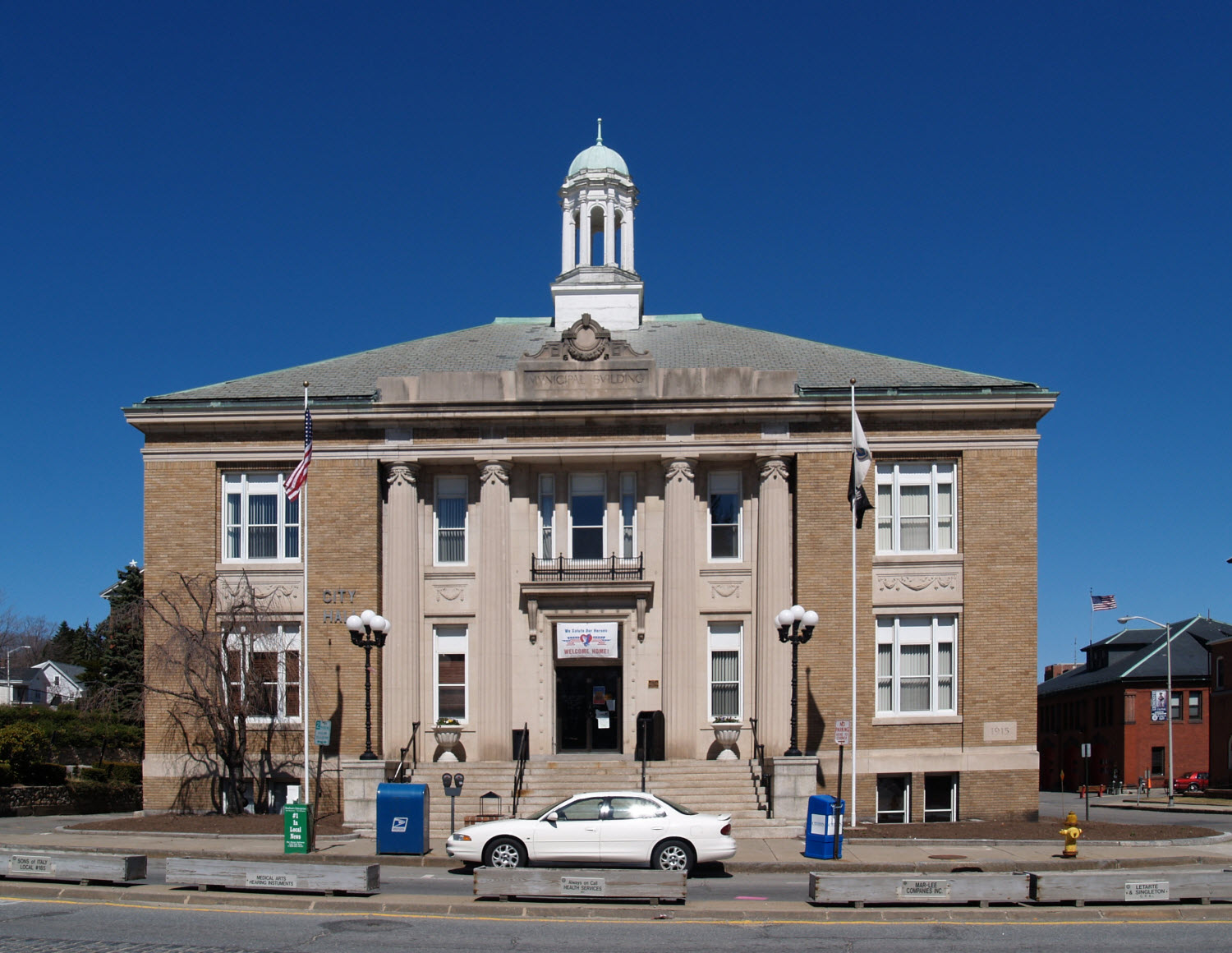
The Leominster Municipal Building, designed by Frost & Chamberlain in the Neoclassical style and completed in 1915.

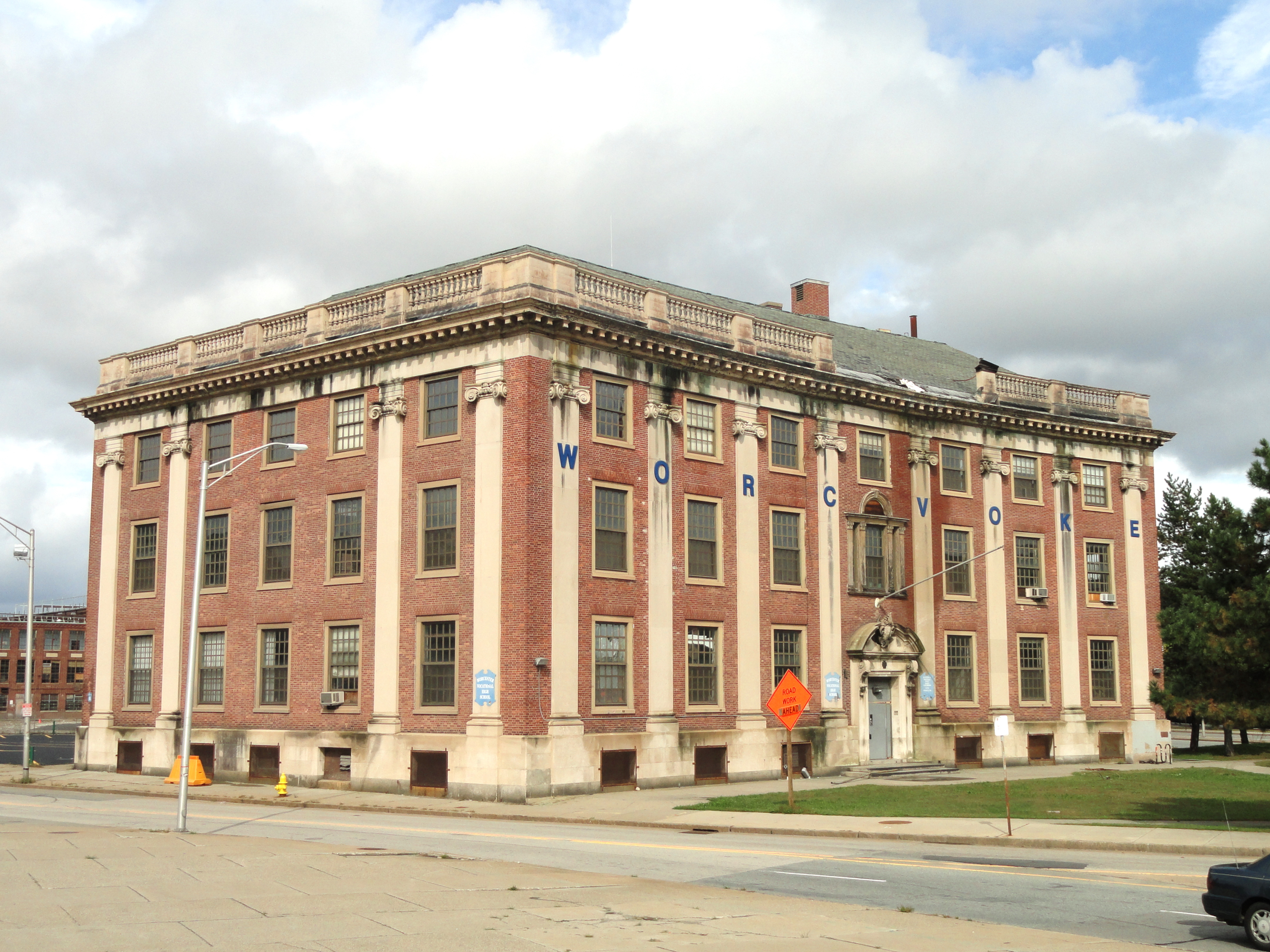
The former Worcester Boys Club, designed by Frost, Chamberlain & Edwards in the Colonial Revival style and completed in 1930.

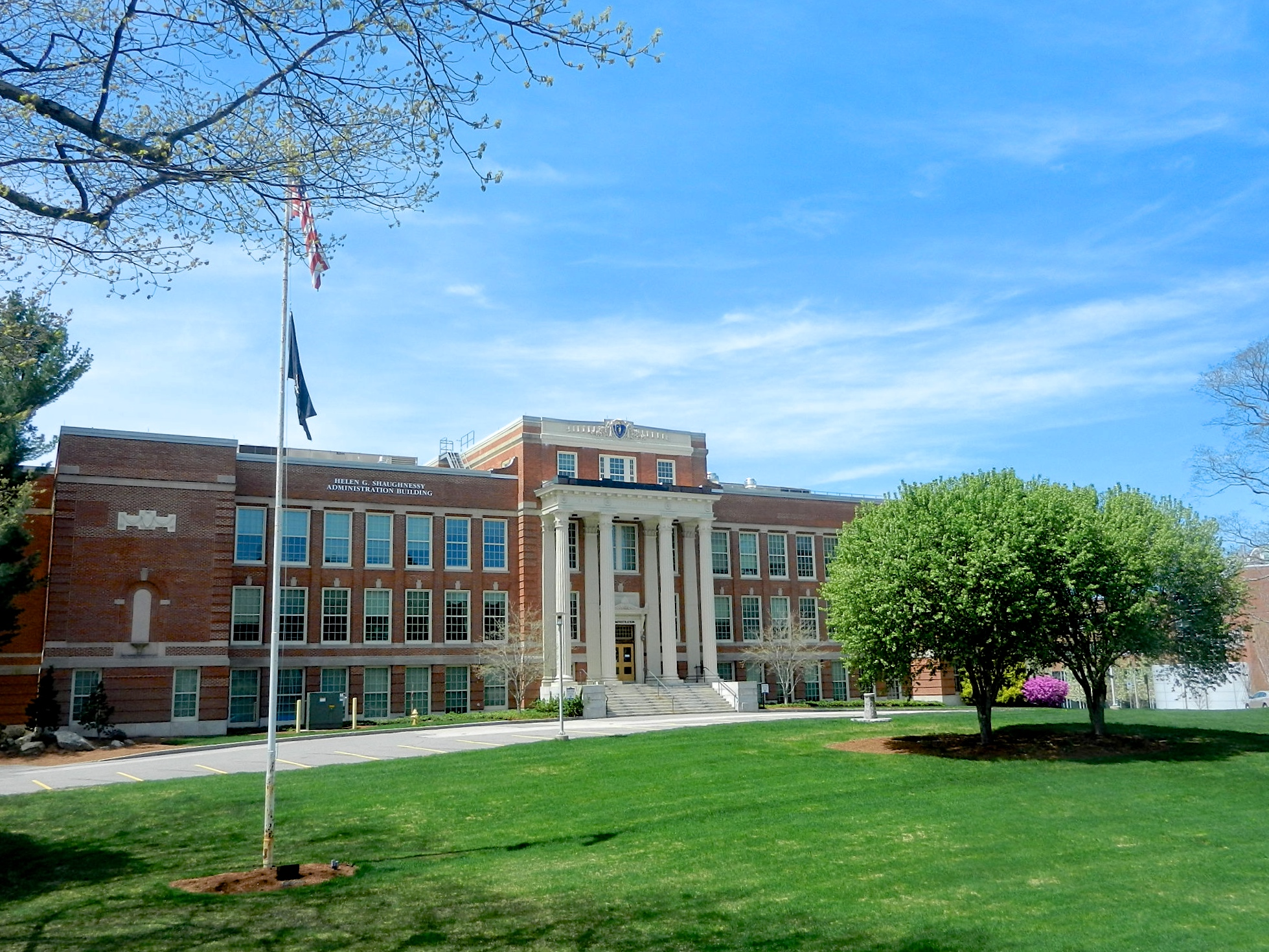
The Shaughnessy Administration Building of Worcester State University, designed by Frost, Chamberlain & Edwards in the Colonial Revival style and completed in 1932.

Frost, Briggs & Chamberlain, later Frost & Chamberlain and Frost, Chamberlain & Edwards, was an early 20th century architectural firm based in Worcester, Massachusetts.

== History ==
Frost, Briggs & Chamberlain was established in 1899 as the partnership of architects Howard Frost, Lucius W. Briggs and C. Leslie Chamberlain. It was quickly successful, and completed a series of notable public and private projects. In 1912 the initial partnership was dissolved when Briggs left to form his own firm, the L. W. Briggs Company. Frost and Chamberlain continued as the firm of Frost & Chamberlain. In 1923 the firm was reorganized as Frost, Chamberlain & Edwards when Lester B. Edwards joined the partnership. Chamberlain died in 1939, followed by Frost in 1946 and Edwards in 1968.

Chiefly through Briggs' efforts, Frost, Briggs & Chamberlain emerged as the leading architectural firm in Worcester at the beginning of the twentieth century. He took much of this reputation with him when he established his own firm in 1912. Though somewhat diminished, over the next twenty years Frost & Chamberlain and Frost, Chamberlain & Edwards were responsible for several major projects in the Worcester area.

Architect Wallace K. Harrison, a Worcester native, was employed by Frost & Chamberlain between 1913 and 1916.

== Partner biographies ==
=== Howard Frost ===
Howard Frost (December 30, 1859 – January 9, 1946) was born in Deep River, Connecticut, to John Hodgman Frost and Elizabeth Frost, née Low. He was educated in the Worcester public schools and at Harvard University, but withdrew at the end of his freshman year to join Fuller & Delano, Worcester architects. In 1895 he became a partner in the firm, which was renamed Fuller, Delano & Frost. He was with this firm until establishing Frost, Briggs & Chamberlain.

Frost died in Worcester at the age of 87.

=== C. Leslie Chamberlain ===
Charles Leslie Chamberlain (1865 – 1939) was raised in North Andover. As a young man he worked for Fuller & Delano and was promoted to superintendent in 1888. By 1893 he was working in the same role for Amos P. Cutting, and for him supervised the First Congregational Church (1894) in Nashua, New Hampshire. Prior to joining Frost and Briggs he had been working for the Webb Granite and Construction Company of Worcester.<

Chamberlain was married in 1891 to Elizabeth White Dennis of Worcester. He died in 1939.

=== Lester B. Edwards ===
Lester B. Edwards (1879 – 1968) worked as a drafter for Briggs and for the Central Building Company before joining Frost & Chamberlain c. 1920.

== Works ==
=== Frost, Briggs & Chamberlain, 1899–1912 ===
- 1901 – South High School (former), 14 Richards St, Worcester, Massachusetts
- 1902 – Forbush Memorial Library, (Note: A contributing resource to the Westminster Village–Academy Hill Historic District, NRHP-listed in 1983.) 118 Main St, Westminster, Massachusetts
- 1902 – Tatnuck Country Club, 1222 Pleasant St, Worcester, Massachusetts
- 1903 – Jefferson Academic Center, (Note: A contributing resource to the Clark University historic district, NRHP-listed in 1980.) Clark University, Worcester, Massachusetts
- 1905 – Chandler Bullock house, (Note: A contributing resource to the Lincoln Estate–Elm Park Historic District, NRHP-listed in 1983.) 41 Sever St, Worcester, Massachusetts
- 1905 – Dexter Memorial Town Hall (former), (Note: A contributing resource to the Charlton Center Historic District, NRHP-listed in 1995.) 40 Main St, Charlton, Massachusetts
- 1905 – Leominster High School (former), (Note: NRHP-listed.) 261 West St, Leominster, Massachusetts
- 1906 – Carnegie Hall, St. Lawrence University, Canton, New York
- 1907 – Slater Building, 390 Main St, Worcester, Massachusetts
- 1909 – The Dunes, the Charles G. Washburn cottage, 131 Boston Neck Rd, Narragansett Pier, Rhode Island
- 1909 – Gardner Savings Bank Building, 29 Parker St, Gardner, Massachusetts
- 1910 – Worcester Technical High School (former), (Note: A contributing resource to the Institutional District, NRHP-listed in 1980.) 34 Grove St, Worcester, Massachusetts
- 1912 – Beaman Memorial Public Library, 8 Newton St, West Boylston, Massachusetts

=== Frost & Chamberlain, 1912–1923 ===
- 1915 – Leominister Municipal Building, (Note: A contributing resource to the Monument Square Historic District, NRHP-listed in 1982.) 25 West St, Leominster, Massachusetts
- 1915 – Worcester Boys' Club (former), 2 Ionic Ave, Worcester, Massachusetts
- 1921 – David Hale Fanning Trade School for Girls (former), 24 Chatham St, Worcester, Massachusetts
- 1923 – Massachusetts Protective Association Building, 18 Chestnut St, Worcester, Massachusetts

=== Frost, Chamberlain & Edwards, from 1923 ===
- 1925 – Worcester Chamber of Commerce Building, (Note: A contributing resource to the Main and Franklin Streets Historic District, NRHP-listed in 2022.) 32 Franklin St, Worcester, Massachusetts
- 1927 – Thorndyke Road School, 30 Thorndyke Rd, Worcester, Massachusetts
- 1929 – William H. Dolan house, 53 Highland Ave, Fitchburg, Massachusetts
- 1930 – Worcester Boys' Club (former), 2 Grove St, Worcester, Massachusetts
- 1931 – Norton Abrasives factory, 51 Bridge Rd E, Welwyn Garden City, Hertfordshire, England
- 1931 – Worcester County Hospital, (Note: Demolished or destroyed.) Hospital Dr, Boylston, Massachusetts
- 1932 – Heard Street School, 200 Heard St, Worcester, Massachusetts
- 1932 – Shaughnessy Administration Building, Worcester State University, Worcester, Massachusetts
- 1935 – Butterick School, (Note: A contributing resource to the Sterling Center Historic District, NRHP-listed in 1988.) 1 Park St, Sterling, Massachusetts
