= Beaman Memorial Public Library =

- U.S. National Register of Historic Places
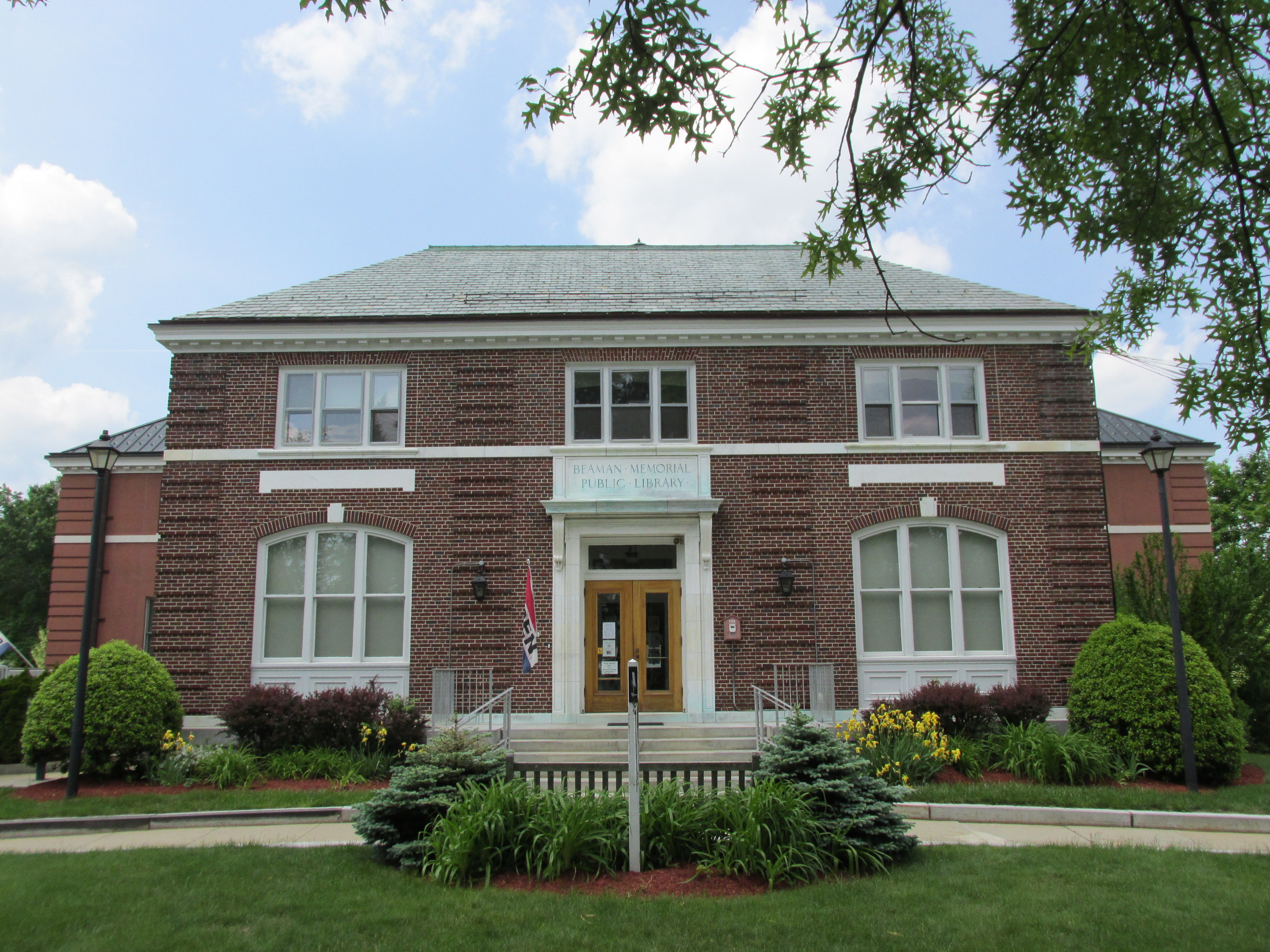

- Location within Massachusetts Location within the United States
- Location: 8 Newton St., West Boylston, Massachusetts
- Coordinates: 42°21′54″N 71°47′0″W
- Architect: Frost, Briggs & Chamberlain
- Architectural style: Colonial Revival
- NRHP reference No.: 16000251
- Added to NRHP: May 16, 2016

The Beaman Memorial Public Library is the public library of West Boylston, Massachusetts. It is located near the town common, at 8 Newton Street, in an architecturally distinguished Colonial Revival building constructed in 1912 to a design by Worcester architect Lucius W. Briggs. The building was listed on the National Register of Historic Places in 2016.

== Architecture and history ==
The Beaman Memorial Public Library stands on the northern end of the West Boylston village center, on a triangular parcel of land bounded on two sides by Newton and Central Streets. It is a two-story masonry building, built of brick with marble trim, a raised granite foundation, and a green slate hip roof. The main facade is symmetrical, with three bays. The outer bays have tripled windows set in segmented-arch openings with paneling below, flanking the entrance, which is set in a marble hooded surround. A marble stringcourse separates the first and second floors, and there is a modillioned wooden cornice at the roof line. To the rear of this original building stands a large addition, built in 1999. It was designed by The Preservation Partnership of Weare, New Hampshire, with architect Maximilian L. Ferro in charge. Although it is built using concrete blocks, they are stained to match the brick of the original building, and other exterior features were designed in sympathy to the original.

The public library of West Boylston was established in 1874 by the bequest of David Lee Rice, and originally was housed in a room of the high school. It later expanded to other quarters, but the entire town center was forced to relocate in the early 20th century, when the Wachusett Reservoir was created. The present library building was built as part of a municipal construction program occasioned by that event, and was a gift to the town of George Calvin Rice. The building was designed by Worcester architects Frost, Briggs & Chamberlain, with Lucius W. Briggs as the partner responsible for the design. It is the town's only institutional example of Colonial Revival architecture. It is also an important early collaboration between Briggs and the builder, E.F. Cross of Worcester, who went on to collaborate on a number of other significant projects. The library is named for Ezra Beaman, George Calvin Rice's grandfather.

== See also ==
- National Register of Historic Places listings in Worcester County, Massachusetts
