= George Gabriel House =

Historic house in Massachusetts, United States

- U.S. National Register of Historic Places
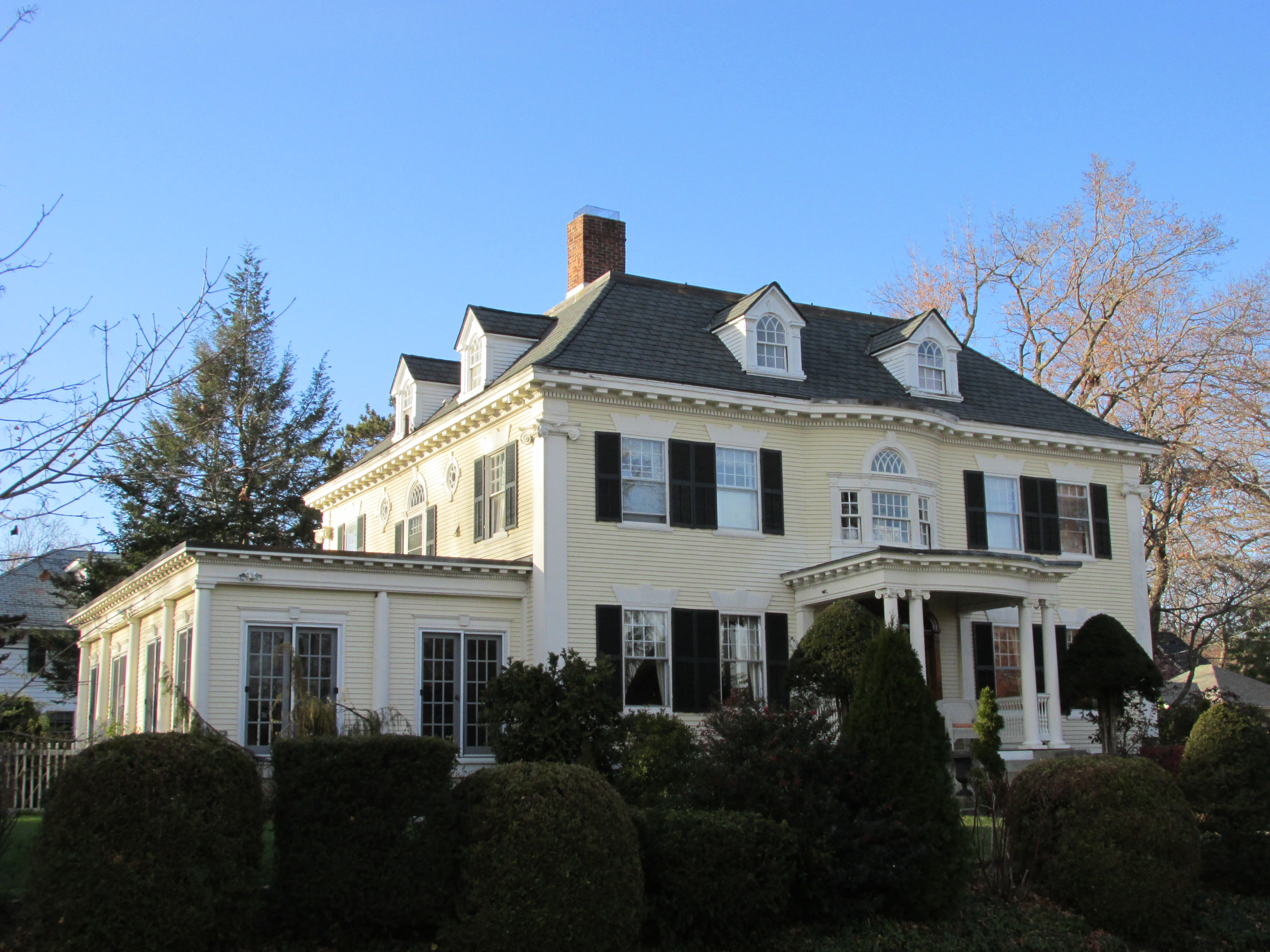

- Location within Massachusetts Location within the United States
- Location: 31 Lenox Street, Worcester, Massachusetts
- Coordinates: 42°16′39″N 71°50′2″W
- Area: less than one acre
- Built: 1898
- Architect: Lucius W. Briggs
- Architectural style: Colonial Revival
- MPS: Worcester MRA
- NRHP reference No.: 80000523
- Added to NRHP: March 05, 1980

The George Gabriel House is a historic house at 31 Lenox Street in Worcester, Massachusetts. Built in 1898, it is a significant local example of Colonial Revival architecture, and is one of the oldest houses in the city's Richmond Heights neighborhood. It was listed on the National Register of Historic Places in 1980.

== Description and history ==
The George Gabriel House is located in the residential Richmond Heights area northwest of downtown Worcester, on the west side of Lenox Street near its northern end. It is a 2 1/2-story wood-frame structure, with a hip roof and clapboarded exterior. The house has a generally rectangular plan, with a front porch supported by Ionic columns. On the second floor above the porch there is a bowed oriel with a Palladian window. The roof is pierced by gabled dormers which have round-arch windows. The building corners feature Corinthian pilasters, and the main roof has a cornice with dentil moulding. The interior has twelve rooms, five of which are bedrooms.

The house was built in 1898 for George W. Gabriel, bookkeeper and later General Manager for George F Blake & Co. The house was one of the earliest works of the well-known Worcester architect Lucius W. Briggs. The area had been farmland up to 1896, when it was subdivided for residential development. The house is one of the earliest, and finest, houses in the city's Richmond Heights neighborhood, and exemplifies an ongoing trend of the city's upper class to live on its west side.

== See also ==
- National Register of Historic Places listings in northwestern Worcester, Massachusetts
- National Register of Historic Places listings in Worcester County, Massachusetts
