= Leon Kroll =

American painter

- Leon Kroll, April 18, 1929
- Born: December 6, 1884; New York City, New York, U.S.
- Died: October 25, 1974 (aged 89); Gloucester, Massachusetts, U.S.
- Known for: Painting
- Elected: National Academy of Design (1927); American Academy of Arts and Letters (1930)

Leon Kroll (December 6, 1884 – October 25, 1974) was an American painter and lithographer. A figurative artist described by Life magazine as "the dean of U.S. nude painters", he was also a landscape painter and also produced an exceptional body of still life compositions. His public art includes murals for the Department of Justice Building in Washington, D.C. He created his only mosaic for the chapel ceiling at Normandy American Cemetery and Memorial.

== Biography ==
Leon Kroll was born into a musical family on lower Second Avenue in New York City. His father was a violinist, and his cousin was composer William Kroll. He studied at the Art Students League of New York under John Henry Twachtman, and at the Académie Julian in Paris with Jean Paul Laurens in the late 1800s.

In 1911 and 1912, he showed in the group exhibition of The Independents initiated by Robert Henri at the MacDowell Club in New York. "It was a self chosen group: you had to be elected by the other ten. Hopper was in it and Speicher, John Sloan as well as Henri, Glackens and Luks - It was a very good group of the best artists" said Kroll.

In 1913 Kroll showed work at the Armory Show.

In addition to his own work, Kroll taught at the Art Students League of New York and the school of the National Academy of Design, where he had his first solo exhibition in 1910, was named as Associate in 1920 and as full Academician in 1927. Kroll also taught advertising and poster design at Cooper Union from 1926-1930. In 1911 he was elected to the Salmagundi Club New York as an Artist member. In 1930, he was elected to the American Academy of Arts and Letters. He was also named Chevalier of the Legion of Honor in 1950. Kroll died in Gloucester, Massachusetts aged 89.

Artist-writer Jerome Myers in his autobiography Artist In Manhattan said:

Leon Kroll has the eye of a hawk and the heart of a dove, which is to say that he has both intelligence and feeling. What he has given to our art is a matter of public record over more years than either he or I would care to say. An academician and at the same time a humanitarian, Leon Kroll is a consummate craftsman, always sympathetic towards youthful talent, boldly standing up for the rights of others as well as for his own. His art activities have been prodigious, overlapping several generations. As a teacher and lecturer, he has been foremost in the van of the Woodstock tradition. He was an able president of the Painters, Sculptors and Engravers Society, and is an outstanding member of the National Academy. A fluent performer in many branches of art, his convictions have remained unshaken by the extremists; he has consistently carried his classic banner through the turmoil of modernism. Leon Kroll's success is to be respected. Personally, I have always found him a gallant adversary in argument, an artist who has captured many hearts as well as many prizes.

== Work ==
Among Kroll's major public works are murals at these locations:

- Department of Justice Building, 1935
- Worcester Memorial Auditorium, Worcester, Massachusetts, 1938–1942
- Senate chamber murals for the Indiana Statehouse, with farm figures described by critics as "Bolsheviks", 1952 (destroyed 1970s)
- Shriver Hall at Johns Hopkins University, circa 1953
- Normandy American Cemetery near Colleville-sur-Mer, France, 1953, his only mosaic
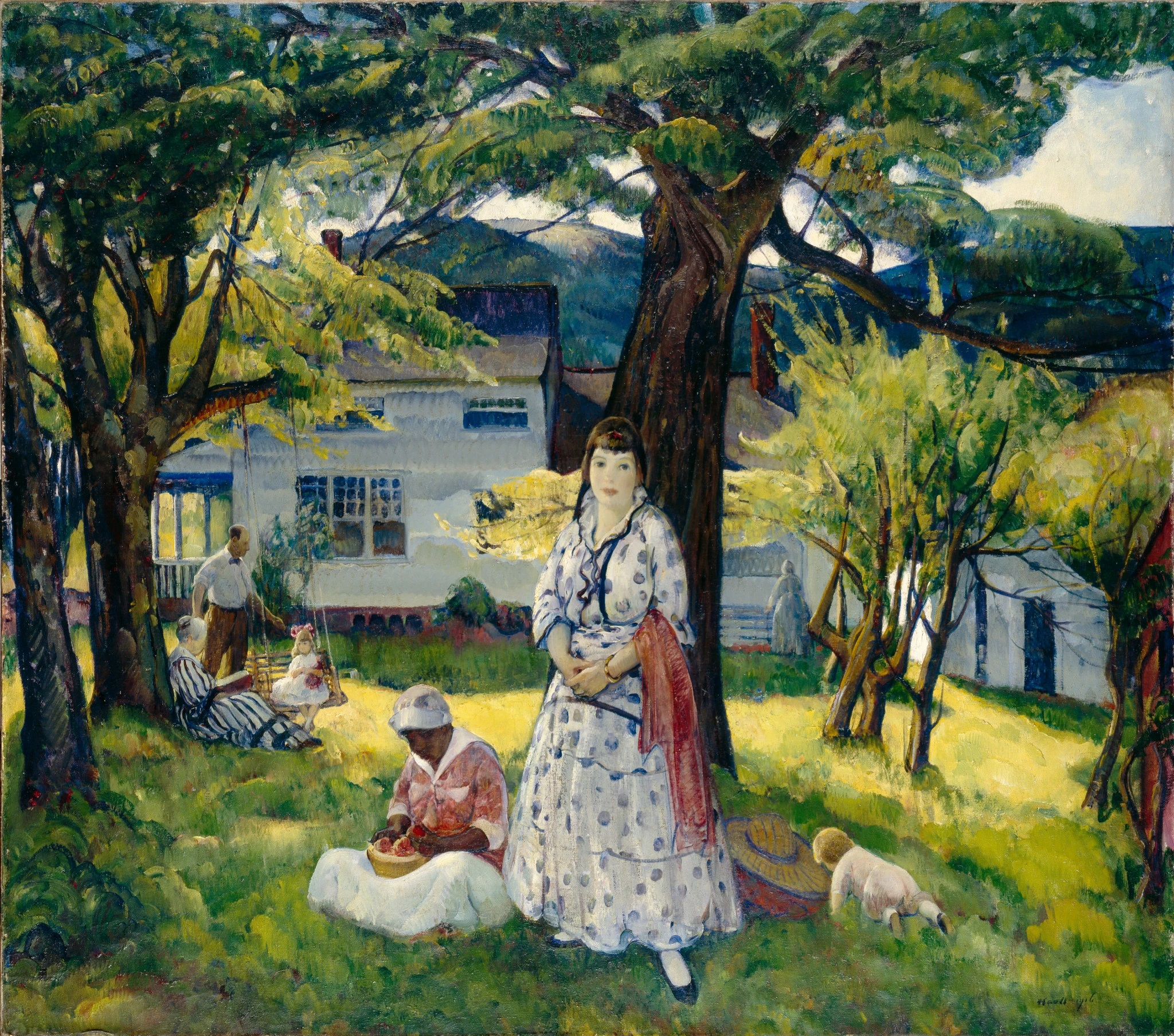
In the Country (1916)

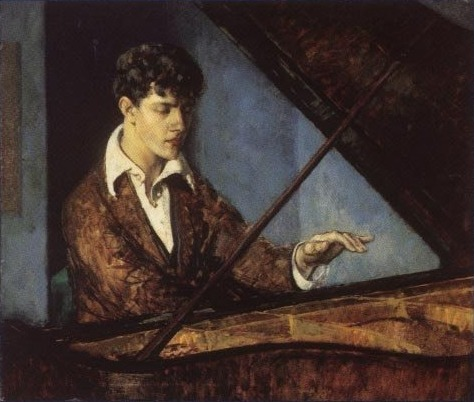
Leo Ornstein at the Piano (1918)

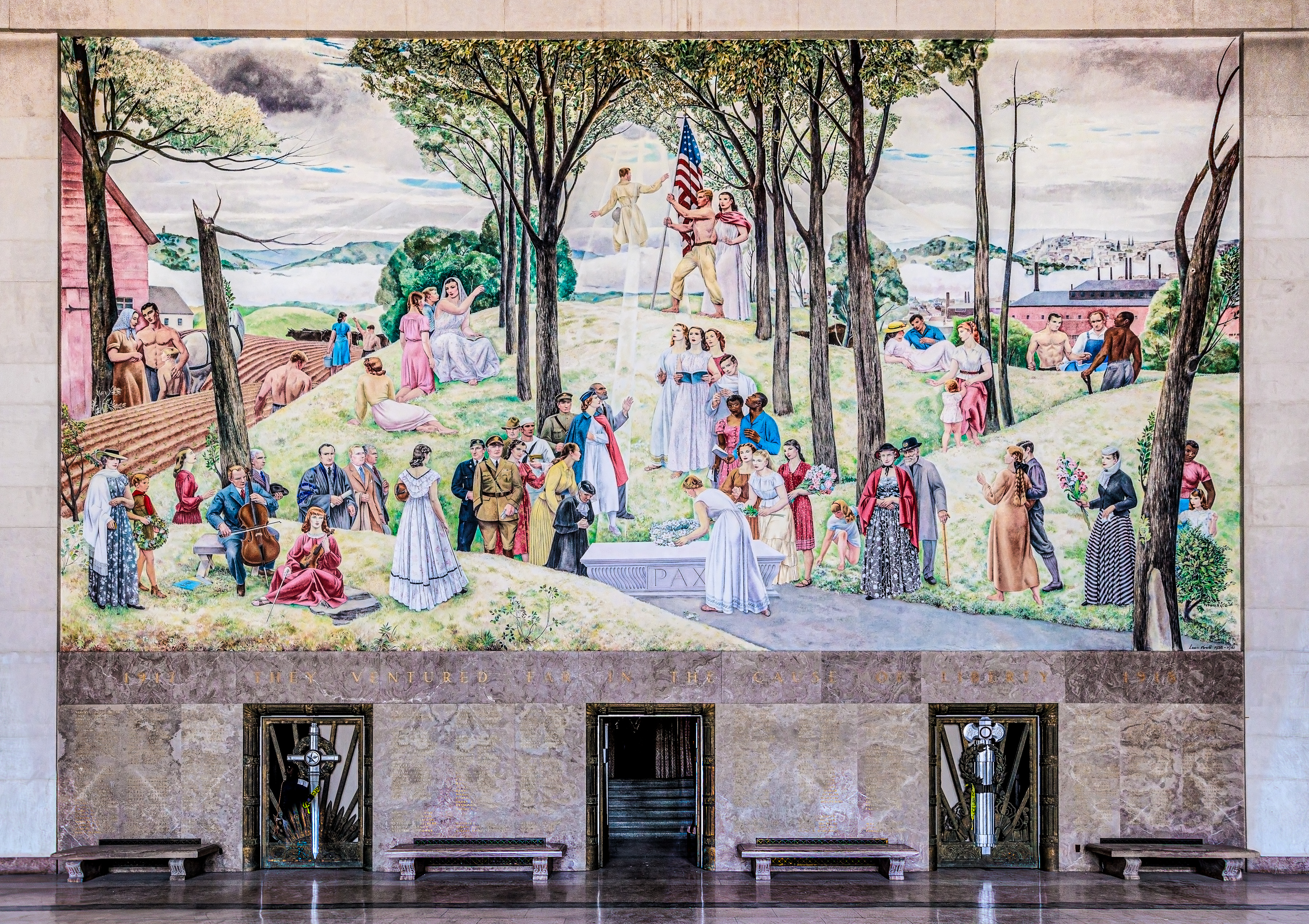
"Shrine of the Immortal," Worcester Memorial Auditorium, completed 1941

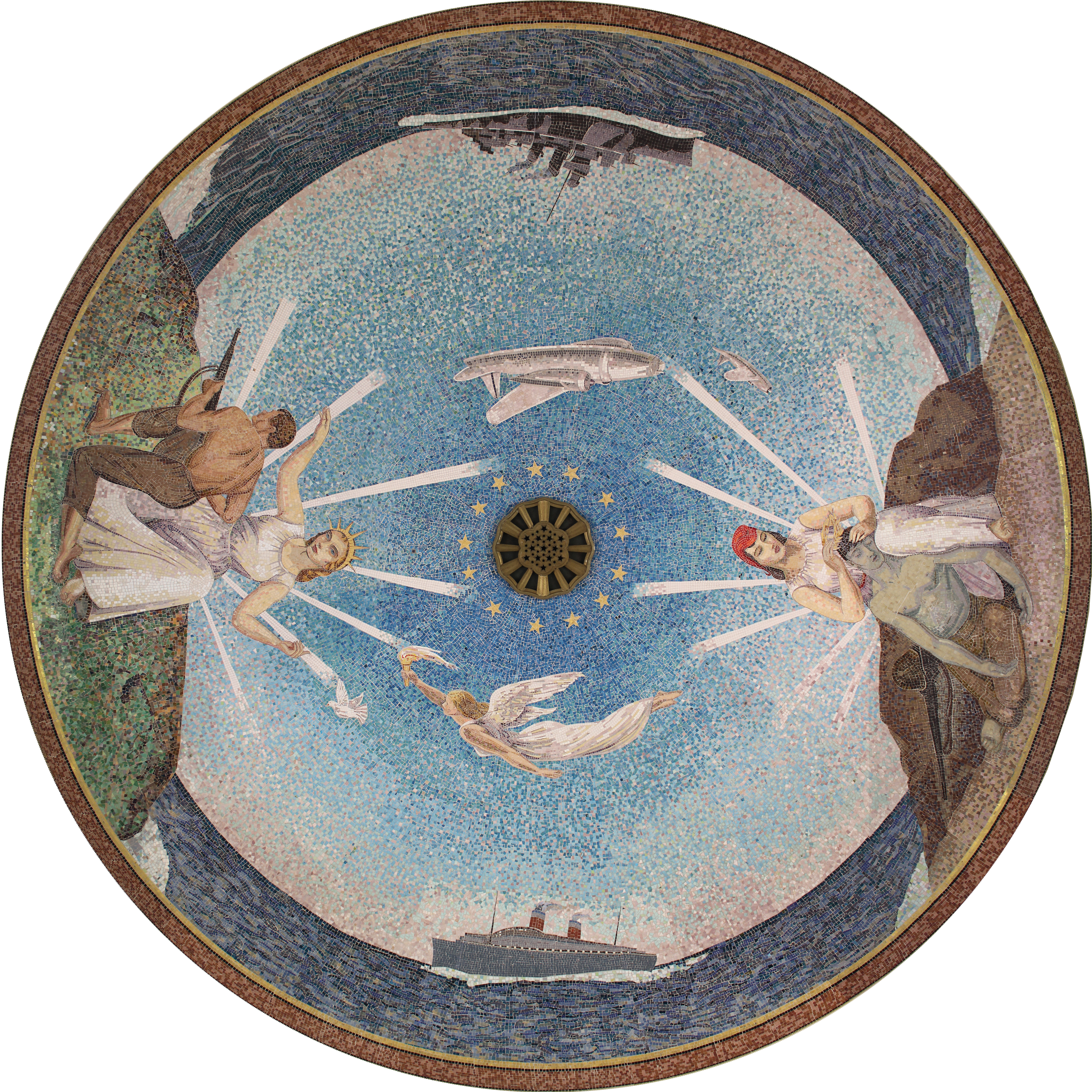
Chapel ceiling mosaic at Normandy American Cemetery (1953)
