= Live Phish 12.31.91 =

Live album by Phish
- Released: December 31, 2011
- Recorded: December 31, 1991
- Venue: Worcester Memorial Auditorium, Worcester, MA
- Genre: Rock, Jazz-Rock, Jam
- Label: JEMP
- Producer: Phish

Live Phish 12.31.91 is an archival live album release by the American rock band Phish, released on December 31, 2011. This download is the first matrix release from LivePhish.com (pooling from both soundboard and audience sources).

The 4,000 seat capacity theater was Phish's largest indoor audience at the time. This show marked the debut of Marjorie Minkin's (bassist Mike Gordon's mom) new 8-panel, plexiglass backdrop which replacing her original canvas piece the band had used to showcase lighting designer Chris Kuroda’s work.

Trey Anastasio played with a voice box called "The Final Word" — a keychain which uttered swear words on demand (heard during "Sparkle," "Esther" and "Wilson"). Before "Divided Sky," Anastasio dedicated the song to a fan named Chris Gainty, who was seeing his first show since a car accident had left him in a coma five months earlier.

== Track listing ==
=== Set One ===
1. "Possum" (Holdsworth) - 8:24
2. "Foam" (Anastasio) - 8:10
3. "Sparkle" (Anastasio/Marshall) - 4:33
4. "Stash" (Anastasio/Marshall) - 8:59
5. "The Lizards" (Anastasio) - 10:03
6. "Guelah Papyrus" (Anastasio/Marshall) - 5:45
7. "Divided Sky" (Anastasio) - 12:41
8. "Esther" (Anastasio) - 9:48
9. "Llama" (Anastasio) - 4:46
10. "Golgi Apparatus" (Anastasio/Abrahams/Marshall/Szuter/Woolf) - 4:55

=== Set Two ===
1. "Brother" (Anastasio/Fishman/Gordon/McConnell) - 6:11
2. "Bouncing Around the Room" (Anastasio/Marshall) - 3:42
3. "Buried Alive" (Anastasio) - 2:28
4. "Auld Lang Syne" (Traditional) - 0:51
5. "Runaway Jim" (Anastasio/Abrahams) - 7:36
6. "The Landlady" (Anastasio) - 3:27
7. "Reba" (Anastasio) - 11:30
8. "Cavern" (Anastasio/Marshall/Herman) - 4:53
9. "My Sweet One" (Fishman) - 2:28
10. "Run Like an Antelope" (Anastasio) - 10:34

=== Set Three ===
1. "Wilson" (Anastasio) - 6:49
2. "The Squirming Coil" (Anastasio/Marshall) 7:33
3. "Tweezer" (Anastasio/Fishman/Gordon/McConnell) - 13:12
4. "McGrupp and the Watchful Hosemasters" (Anastasio) - 8:10
5. "Mike's Song" (Gordon) - 7:42
6. "I Am Hydrogen" (Gordon) - 3:03
7. "Weekapaug Groove" (Anastasio/Fishman/Gordon/McConnell) - 7:09
  - Trey Anastasio teases "The Lion Sleeps Tonight" during his solo
8. Minkin Appreciation - 1:26
  - The band observes a painting done by Mike's mom while lighting tech, Chris Kuroda, changes lighting on the painting

=== Encore ===
1. "Lawn Boy" (Anastasio/Marshall) - 2:30
  - Trey Anastasio teases "The Christmas Song" during his solo
2. "Rocky Top" (Bryant/Bryant) - 2:35
3. "Tweezer Reprise" (Anastasio/Fishman/Gordon/McConnell) - 3:16
