= Katz and Leavitt Apartment House =

- U.S. National Register of Historic Places
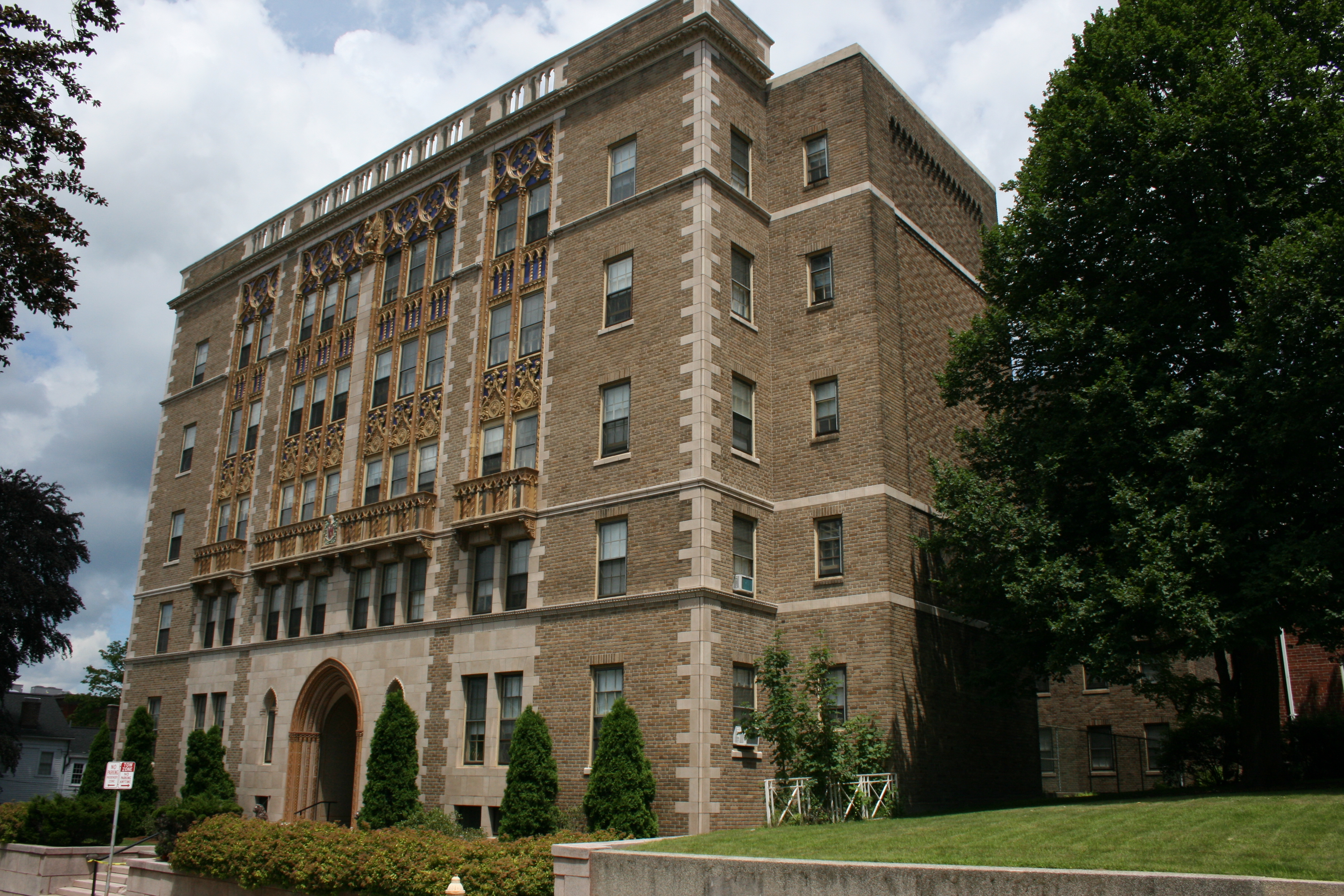

- Location within Massachusetts Location within the United States
- Location: 53 Elm St., Worcester, Massachusetts
- Coordinates: 42°15′55″N 71°48′26″W
- Built: 1926
- Architect: L. W. Briggs Company
- Architectural style: Eclectic Venetian Gothic
- MPS: Worcester MRA
- NRHP reference No.: 80000575
- Added to NRHP: March 05, 1980

The Katz and Leavitt Apartment House is an historic apartment house at 53 Elm Street in Worcester, Massachusetts. The five story brick building, built in 1926 to a design by the L. W. Briggs Company, is one of the most architecturally distinct apartment buildings in the city. It is faced with buff brick, except for the central section of the main facade, which is faced is decorative glazed tile. The feel of its design is Venetian Gothic, with a pointed-arch entry and other Gothic motifs repeated on the upper levels of the building.

The building was listed on the National Register of Historic Places in 1980.

== See also ==
- National Register of Historic Places listings in northwestern Worcester, Massachusetts
- National Register of Historic Places listings in Worcester County, Massachusetts
