= Worcester Memorial Auditorium =

Multi-purpose hall in Worcester, Massachusetts, US

Coordinates: 42.27176°N 71.800965°W

- The Aud
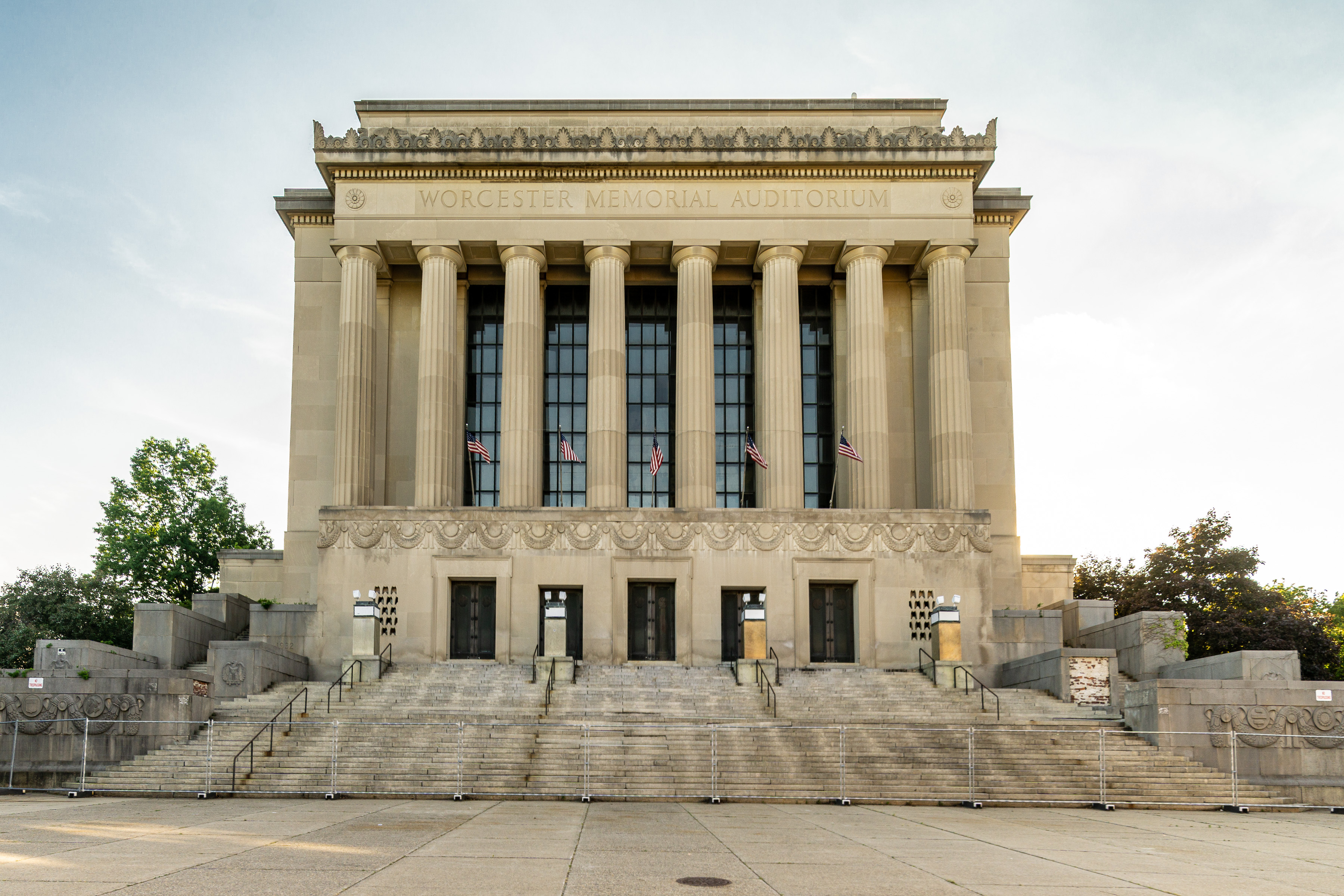
- Interactive map of Worcester Memorial Auditorium
- Address: Lincoln Square; Worcester, Massachusetts; United States
- Owner: City of Worcester, Massachusetts
- Capacity: 3,508
- Current use: Vacant

Construction
- Opened: 1933
- Architects: Frederic C. Hirons and L. W. Briggs Company

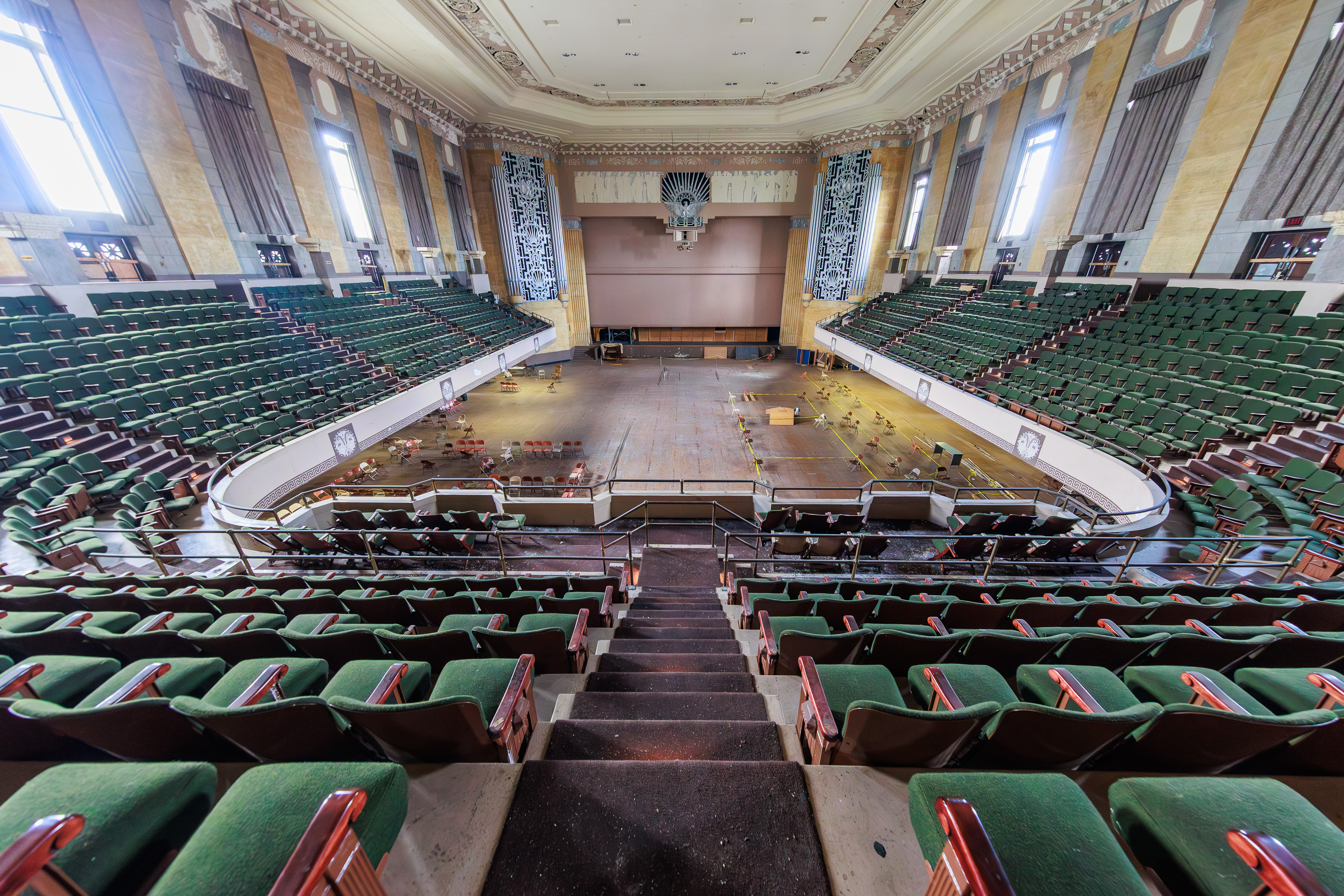
The auditorium in 2025

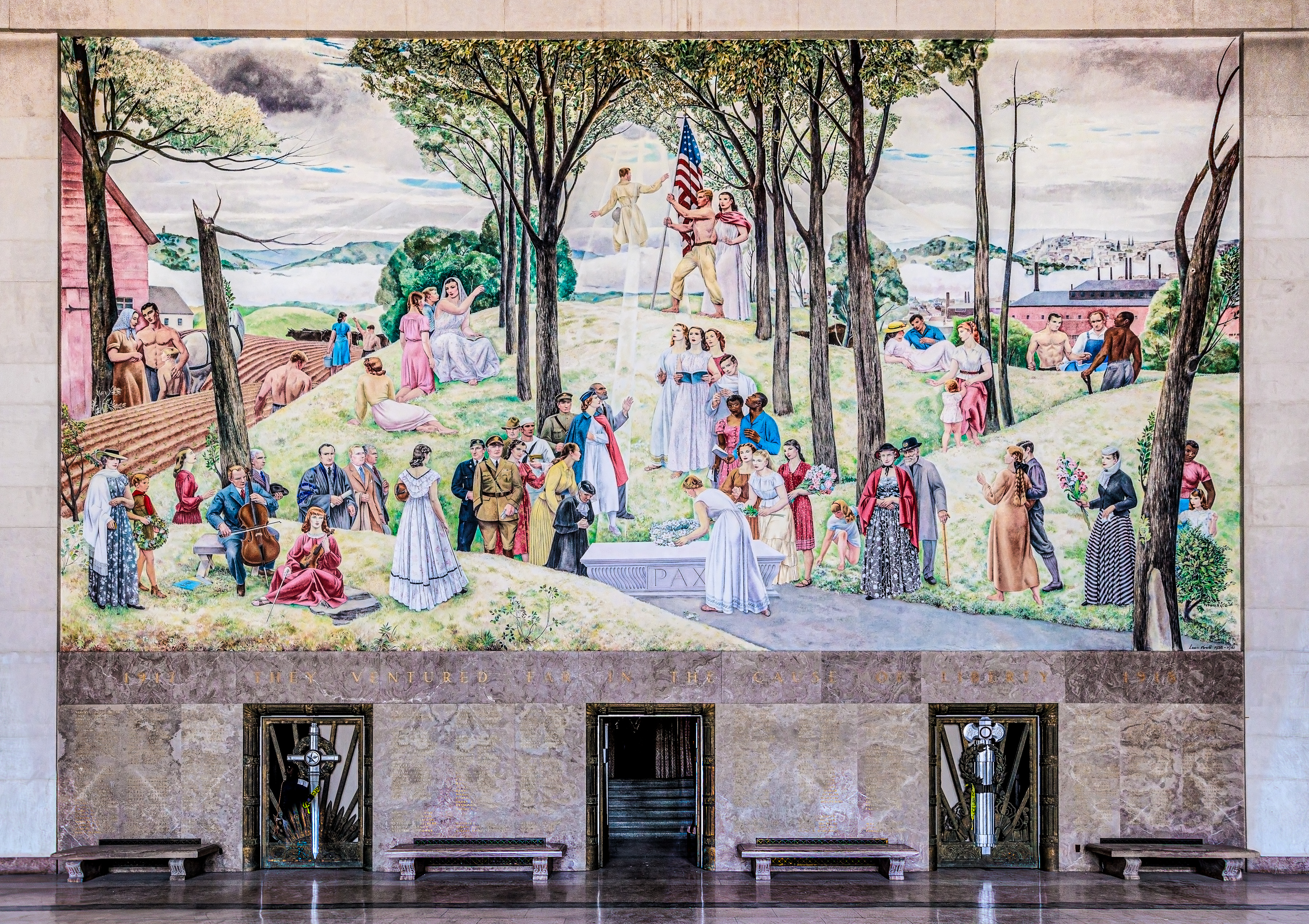
"Shrine of the Immortal" mural by Leon Kroll (completed 1941)

Worcester Memorial Auditorium (also known simply as "the Aud") is a multi-purpose arena located at Lincoln Square in Worcester, Massachusetts. It was built in 1933 to honor Worcester citizens who fought in World War I. The building includes a multi-purpose auditorium originally designed to seat 3,500–4,500 people, a smaller entertainment space known as the Little Theater designed to seat 675, and the Shrine of the Immortal, a war memorial with murals by Leon Kroll commemorating the 355 soldiers and nurses from Worcester who fell during World War I. The Aud is a contributing property to the Institutional District, added to the National Register of Historic Places in 1980. In 2009, Preservation Massachusetts included Lincoln Square on its "Most Endangered Historic Resources" list, because the square's three historic buildings – the Aud, the old Worcester County Courthouse, and the Lincoln Square Boys Club – were all empty or underutilized.

== History ==
At the end of World War I, Worcester's leading citizens decided to construct a public auditorium to commemorate the 355 local residents who lost their lives during the conflict, and more generally to honor the sacrifices of Worcester residents in times of war. It took more than a decade to secure land for the building. When the original plans to construct an auditorium on the Common fell through, the present location at Lincoln Square was selected instead. Construction began in 1931 and was completed in 1933 at a cost of $2 million. A dedication ceremony took place on September 26, 1933, during which the Aud was declared "an enduring tribute to those whose sacrifice was sublime, a majestic memorial for the use and benefit of many generations".

Throughout the twentieth century, the Aud served as the center of Worcester's civic and cultural life. Concerts, basketball games, high school and college graduations, fundraisers, and election day polling all took place in the main hall. Before the Hart Center opened in 1975, the building was home to both the Bay State Bombardiers of the Continental Basketball Association and the Holy Cross Crusaders, whose young star, Bob Cousy, played often on the auditorium court. The hall hosted Bob Dylan's Rolling Thunder Revue as well as many other performers, including Louis Armstrong, B.B. King, and the Rolling Stones. In 2011, the band Phish released an album of their 1991 concert at the Aud. The Aud even served as a shelter after the Worcester tornado hit.

With the construction of modern athletics and performance venues in Worcester, the Aud ceased to be a vital cultural center. At the turn of the twenty-first century, the basement was used briefly as a juvenile court, and the auditorium as storage for Massachusetts State Trial Court records, but the rest of the building fell into disrepair. The Aud has been vacant since 2008. Occasional organ performances took place through 2016, until a burst pipe the following winter caused significant damage to the auditorium floor and rendered the space unfit for public use. The building is now used for S.W.A.T. training.

=== Sale to AHF ===
In 2016, the City of Worcester engaged the Boston-based Architectural Heritage Foundation (AHF) to conduct a feasibility study of the Aud. AHF submitted its final report in February 2019, which recommended that the building become a center for digital innovation, entertainment, entrepreneurship, and the arts.

In May 2019, the Worcester Telegram & Gazette revealed that the City of Worcester had authorized the sale of the Aud to the Architectural Heritage Foundation (AHF). Under the pending agreement, AHF would purchase the property for $450,000 by June 2021 and subsequently undertake a $94 million project to redevelop the building as an educational and cultural center connected to the digital economy. These plans include the preservation of the exterior facades, Shrine of the Immortal murals, Kimball pipe organ, and lobby. The auditorium would be outfitted for competitive gaming, esports competitions, and performances; the Little Theatre converted into an IMAX-style venue suitable for entertainment and educational events by local institutions; the memorial hall rehabilitated as a high-quality restaurant; and the other interior spaces redeveloped as digital innovation labs, green rooms, game rooms, lounges, and offices.

In May 2025, Massachusetts Governor Maura Healey announced a $25 million match commitment to the AHF to assist in its restoration and redevelopment efforts. The governor's press release expressed the hope that the grant will "spark others to step up and provide the full financing necessary to make this project a reality."

== Architecture ==
The Aud was designed by Frederic C. Hirons of New York and L.W. Briggs Company of Worcester in the Classical Revival style, with an Art Deco-inspired interior and bas-relief ornamentation. It was constructed of Deer Island granite, Indiana limestone, and marble. Fronting Lincoln Square are five large bronze doors and eight monumental Doric columns, above which is inscribed, "To honor the services in war of her sons and daughters and to nourish in peace their spirit of sacrifice, a grateful city erected this building." The Aud is five stories high and contains five architectural zones: the auditorium (which contains a proscenium 116 feet wide), the Shrine of the Immortal war memorial, the Little Theater, the north and south-wing chambers, and the basement.

=== Murals ===
Artist Leon Kroll created the Shrine of the Immortal murals, which took three years to complete between 1938 and 1941. Two depict U.S. Army and Navy soldiers in scenes of combat during WWI, while the third and largest depicts a soldier ascending to Heaven surrounded by "people of all classes and races gathered in peace and harmony under the American flag." When completed, this mural was the largest of its kind in the United States.

=== Kimball Pipe Organ ===
In 1933, a Kimball pipe organ containing 6,853 pipes was installed in the auditorium. The console sits on a hydraulic elevator, which historically enabled the console to be raised or lowered between the stage, the auditorium floor, and one level below. The organ has never been altered, and was the centerpiece of a "pipe organ festival" in October 2016.

== Popular culture ==
In 2013, a scene for the film American Hustle was filmed in the Aud.

In 2018, the Aud was transformed into a bank for the Liam Neeson film Honest Thief.
