= Frances Perkins Branch Library =

- U.S. National Register of Historic Places
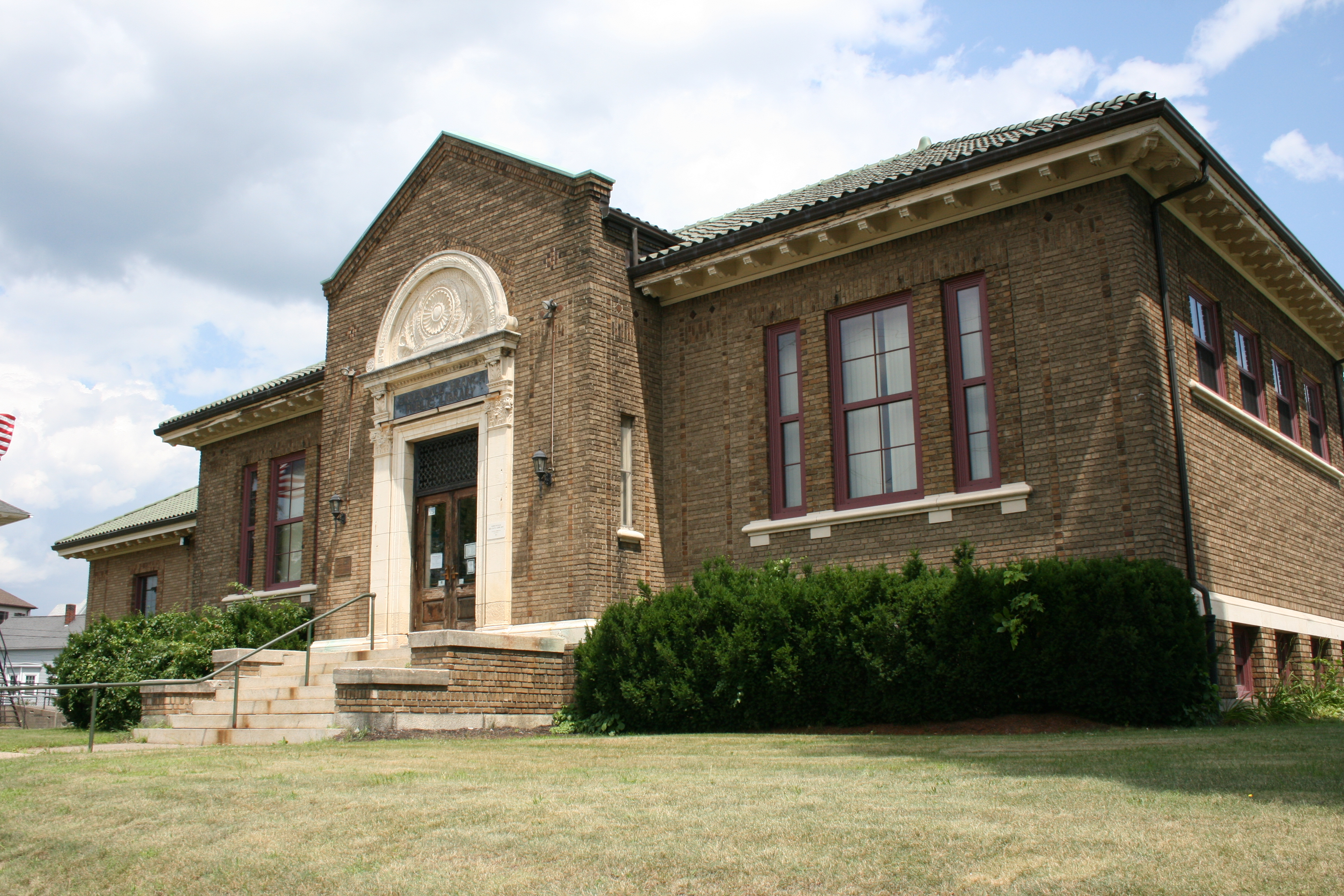

- Location within Massachusetts Location within the United States
- Location: 470 W. Boylston St., Worcester, Massachusetts
- Coordinates: 42°18′26″N 71°47′59″W
- Built: 1913
- Architect: L. W. Briggs Company
- MPS: Worcester MRA
- NRHP reference No.: 80000511
- Added to NRHP: March 5, 1980

The Frances Perkins Branch Library, formerly known as the Greendale Branch Library, is a branch library in the public library system of Worcester, Massachusetts. It is located at 470 West Boylston Street, in an architecturally distinguished building, funded in part by Andrew Carnegie and built in 1913. The building was listed on the National Register of Historic Places in 1980.

== Architecture and history ==
The library is located on Worcester north side, and is set on the east side of West Boylston Street (Massachusetts Route 12), on the corner of Kendrick Avenue. It is a single story masonry structure, finished in brick with limestone trim. It has a tile hipped roof with modillioned eave. Its main facade has a projecting central pavilion in which the main entrance is set, flanked by Corinthian pilasters and topped by a semicircular pediment.

Worcester's public library was established in 1859, begun with donated collections and initially stored in a central library on Elm Street. In 1895 the city established a delivery point for books at a shop in the Greendale area, an idea that was expanded to other areas after it met with success. After a drive began in 1908 to establish branch libraries, the city received a gift of $75,000 from the steel baron and philanthropist Andrew Carnegie, which was used in the construction of three branches, including this one. It was designed by Lucius W. Briggs, of the L. W. Briggs Company, and was completed in 1913. The branch was renamed in 1994 in honor of Frances Perkins, the first female member of the United States Cabinet and a resident of Worcester during her youth. Perkins served as the United States Secretary of Labor from 1933 to 1945, through the entire presidency of Franklin Delano Roosevelt, leading the department through the Great Depression and World War II.

== See also ==
- List of Carnegie libraries in Massachusetts
- National Register of Historic Places listings in eastern Worcester, Massachusetts
