= Lucius W. Briggs =

American architect

Lucius Wallace Briggs
- Born: August 26, 1866; Worcester, Massachusetts, US
- Died: September 10, 1940 (aged 74); Worcester, Massachusetts, US
- Occupation: Architect
- Practice: L. W. Briggs; Frost, Briggs & Chamberlain; L. W. Briggs Company

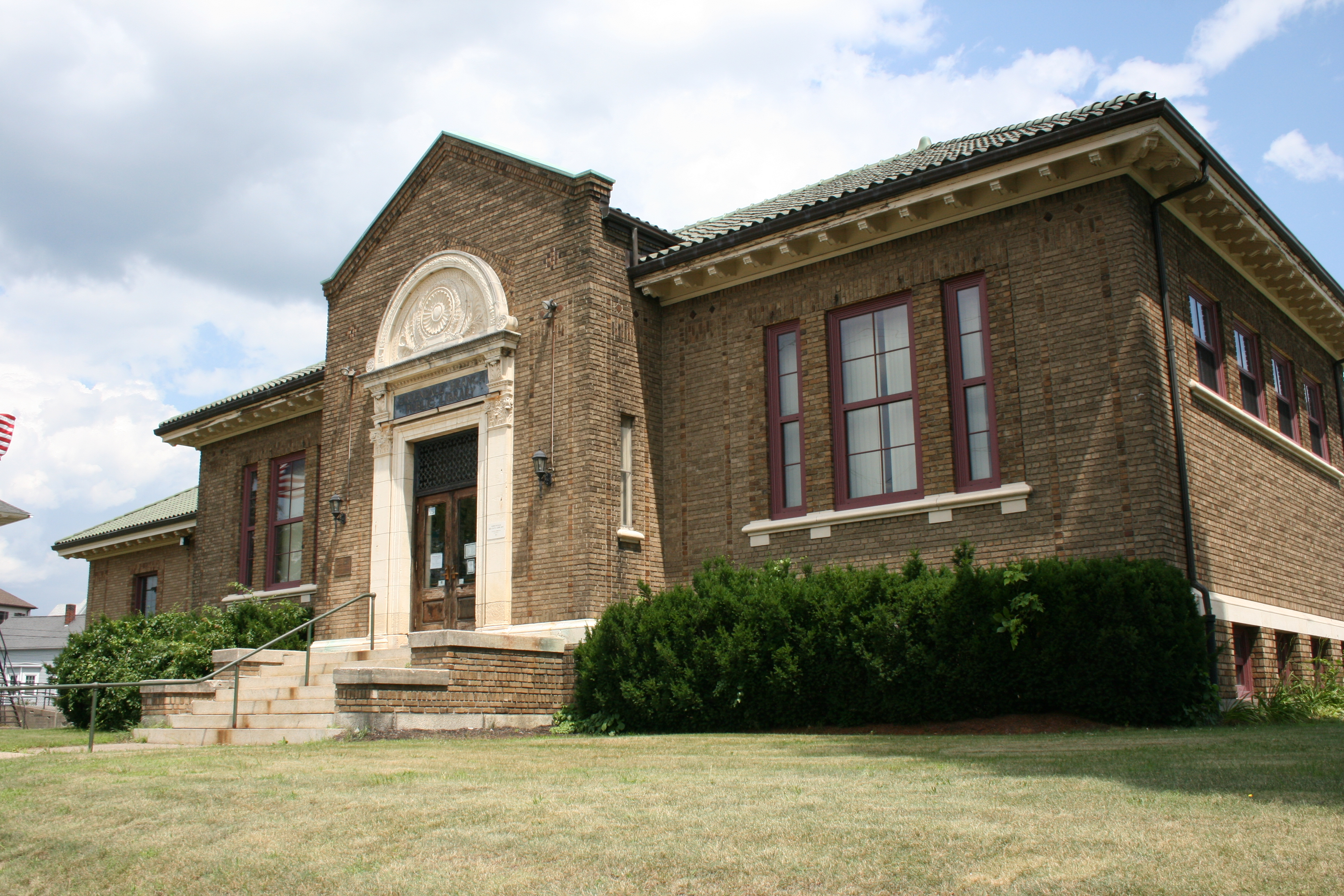
The Frances Perkins Branch Library in Worcester, designed by Briggs in the Italian Renaissance Revival style and completed in 1913.

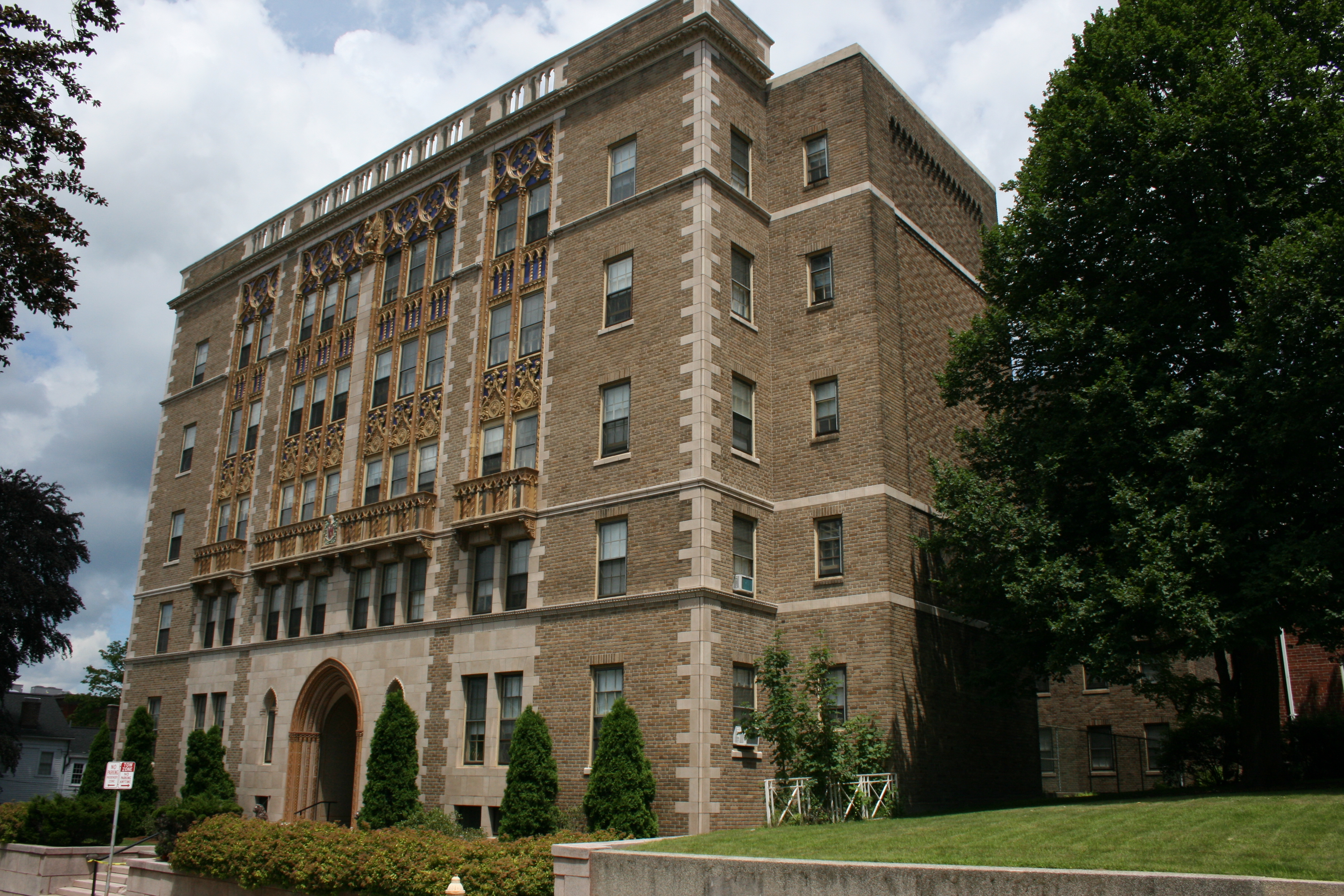
The Katz and Leavitt Apartment House in Worcester, designed by Briggs in the Venetian Gothic style and completed in 1926.

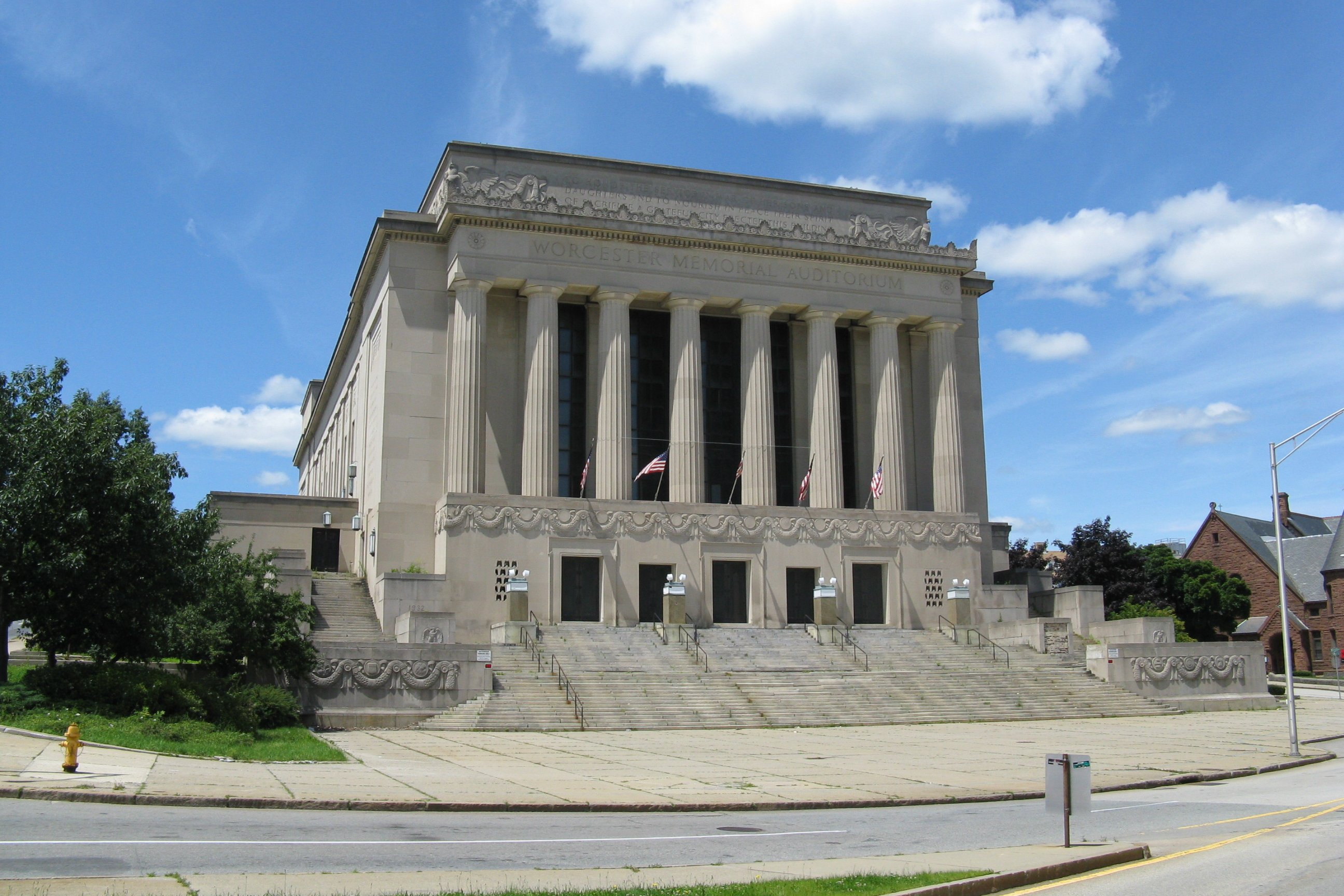
The Worcester Memorial Auditorium, designed by associated architects Briggs and Frederic Charles Hirons in the Neoclassical style and completed in 1933.

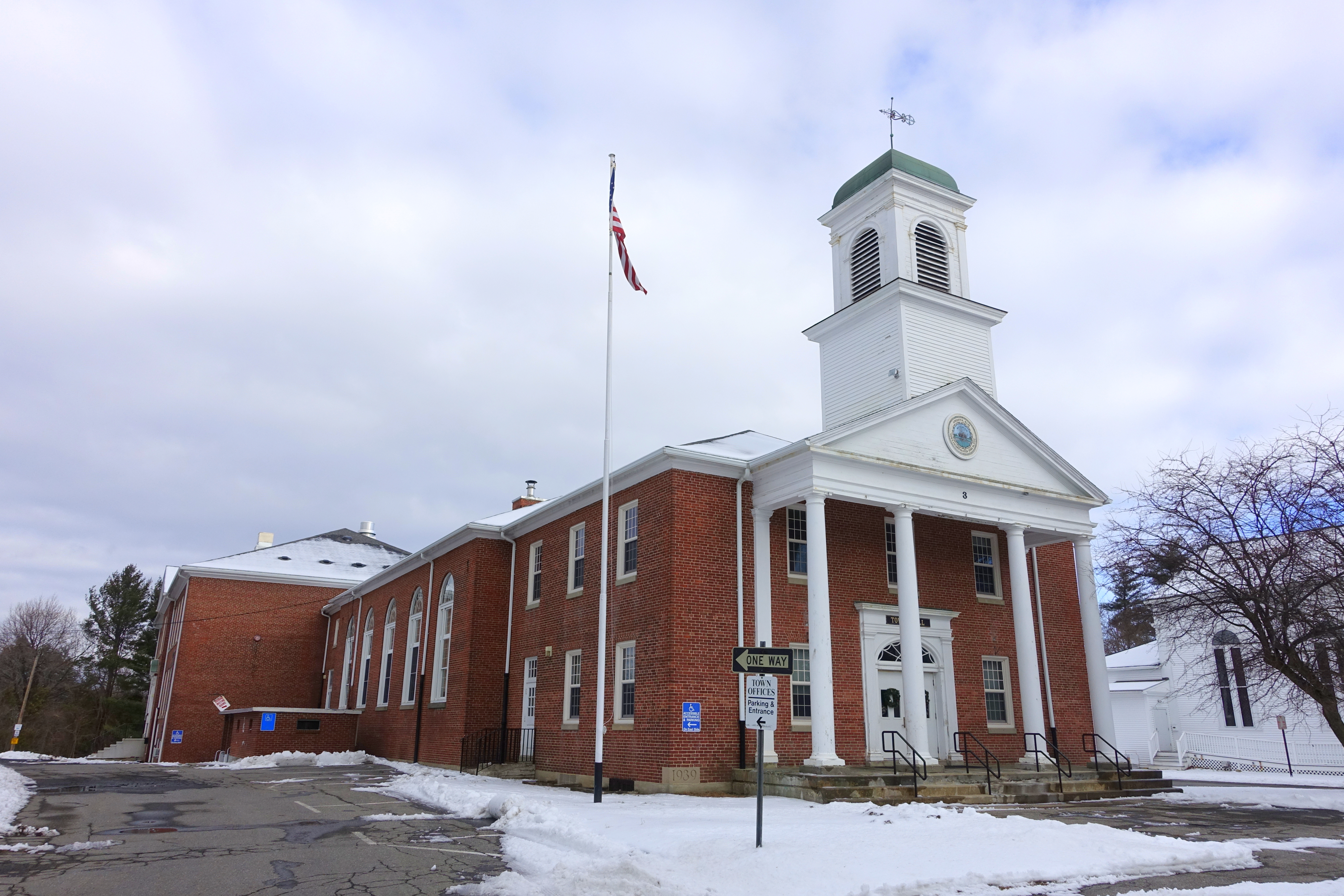
The Leicester Town Hall, designed by Briggs in the Colonial Revival and completed in 1939.

Lucius W. Briggs AIA (August 26, 1866 – September 10, 1940) was an American architect in practice in Worcester, Massachusetts from 1896 until his death in 1940. During that period he was the city's leading architect.

== Life and career ==
Lucius Wallace Briggs was born August 26, 1866, in Worcester to Cornelius Winters Briggs, a mechanical engineer, and Lucy Ryder Briggs, née Wallace. He was educated in the Worcester public schools and as a special student in architecture at the Massachusetts Institute of Technology. He worked as a drafter for Worcester contractors Norcross Brothers and architects Barker & Nourse and Fuller & Delano. In 1896 he left to open his own office. His early practice was chiefly residential, and he was a runner-up in the competition to design the new Worcester County Courthouse.

In 1899 he formed the partnership of Frost, Briggs & Chamberlain with Howard Frost and C. Leslie Chamberlain, former colleagues from the office of Fuller & Delano. The new firm quickly outpaced Worcester's other architects and became the city's most prominent architects. This firm was, among other projects, responsible for the design of such landmarks as the Slater Building. In 1912, after thirteen years, the partnership was dissolved. Frost & Chamberlain continued their practice, and Briggs incorporated the L. W. Briggs Company. He continued in his former success, and at the time of his death was Worcester's best known architect.

Briggs joined the American Institute of Architects in 1902 as a member of the former Worcester chapter. He served as chapter president for twenty years. For many years he also served on the Worcester Planning Board.

== Personal life ==
Briggs was married in 1889 to Lillian Fraser Vickers of Portland, Maine. They had four children, two sons and two daughters. Stuart Wallace Briggs, who worked with his father, was the youngest.

In addition to his professional associations, Briggs was also a member of the Society for the Preservation of New England Antiquities, the Worcester Country Club and local fraternal organizations.

Briggs died September 10, 1940, in Worcester at the age of 74.

== Legacy ==
After Briggs' death, the firm was continued by his son, Stuart W. Briggs, a Worcester Polytechnic Institute graduate who had been associated with him since 1920. In 1949 he reorganized the firm as L. W. Briggs Associates. The work of the younger Briggs includes the Worcester County Courthouse annex (1954, with Cornelius W. Buckley) and Burncoat High School (1964) He died in 1968.

At least three buildings designed independently by Briggs have been listed on the United States National Register of Historic Places, in addition to three designed by Frost, Briggs & Chamberlain. Others contribute to listed historic districts.

== Works ==
- 1898 – George Gabriel House, (Note: NRHP-listed.) 31 Lenox St, Worcester, Massachusetts
- 1913 – Frances Perkins Branch Library, 470 W Boylston St, Worcester, Massachusetts
- 1914 – Frank O. Woodland house, (Note: Later owned by John Jeppson and given to the Worcester Polytechnic Institute by his descendants. The house is now the known as Jeppson House and is used by the presidents of the school.) 1 Drury Ln, Worcester, Massachusetts
- 1914 – Worcester Country Club, 2 Rice St, Worcester, Massachusetts
- 1917 – Worcester Technical High School expansion, (Note: Originally completed in 1910 by Frost, Briggs & Chamberlain.) (Note: A contributing resource to the Institutional District, NRHP-listed in 1980.) 34 Grove St, Worcester, Massachusetts
- 1925 – Worcester Fire Alarm Station, 230 Park Ave, Worcester, Massachusetts
- 1926 – Katz and Leavitt Apartment House, 53 Elm St, Worcester, Massachusetts
- 1931 – South High School annex, 14 Richards St, Worcester, Massachusetts
- 1933 – Worcester Memorial Auditorium, (Note: Designed by Lucius W. Briggs and Frederic Charles Hirons, associated architects.) 1 Lincoln Sq, Worcester, Massachusetts
- 1936 – Auburn High School, (Note: Demolished.) 99 Auburn St, Auburn, Massachusetts
- 1939 – Leicester Town Hall, (Note: A contributing resource to the Washburn Square–Leicester Common Historic District, NRHP-listed in 2006.) 3 Washburn Sq, Leicester, Massachusetts
