= Leominster High School (1904 building) =

- U.S. National Register of Historic Places
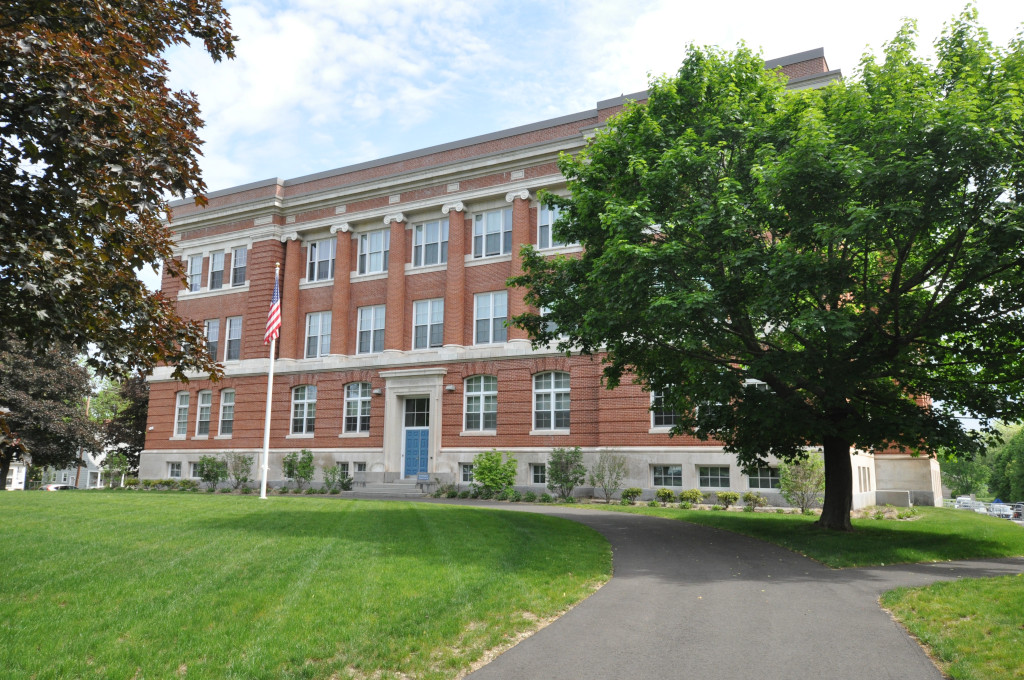

- Location within Massachusetts Location within the United States
- Location: 261 West St., Leominster, Massachusetts
- Coordinates: 42°31′57″N 71°46′21″W
- Built: 1904
- Architect: Frost, Briggs & Chamberlain
- Architectural style: Classical Revival
- NRHP reference No.: 100006083
- Added to NRHP: February 1, 2021

The Leominster High School 1905 building, also known as the Carter Junior High School, is an historic school building at 261 West Street in Leominster, Massachusetts. Built in 1904–05, it is the city's most architecturally elaborate school building, serving as its second high school building until 1963, when the present high school was built. The building was listed on the National Register of Historic Places in 2021.

== Description and history ==
The old Leominster High School is located northwest of downtown Leominster, east of the junction of West and Hall Streets. It is a three-story masonry structure, built out of red brick with trim of limestone and granite. It is Classical Revival in style, with engaged Doric columns arrayed between the windows of the second and third floors on the front facade above and around the main entrance. The entrance is set in a recess framed by a limestone surround, and is accessed by granite steps. The building is crowned by an entablature and parapet.

The school was built in 1904–05 by William F. Dunn, to a design by the Worcester architectural firm Frost, Briggs & Chamberlain. It served as the city's second high school, replacing the original Field High School built in 1865. It remained in that use until 1963, when the present high school opened. It was then converted into a junior high school and named in honor of James Gordon Carter, a Leominster native and early proponent of public education. The building has since been redeveloped into affordable apartment buildings.

== See also ==
- National Register of Historic Places listings in Worcester County, Massachusetts
