= Charlton Center Historic District =

Historic district in Massachusetts, United States

- U.S. National Register of Historic Places
- U.S. Historic district
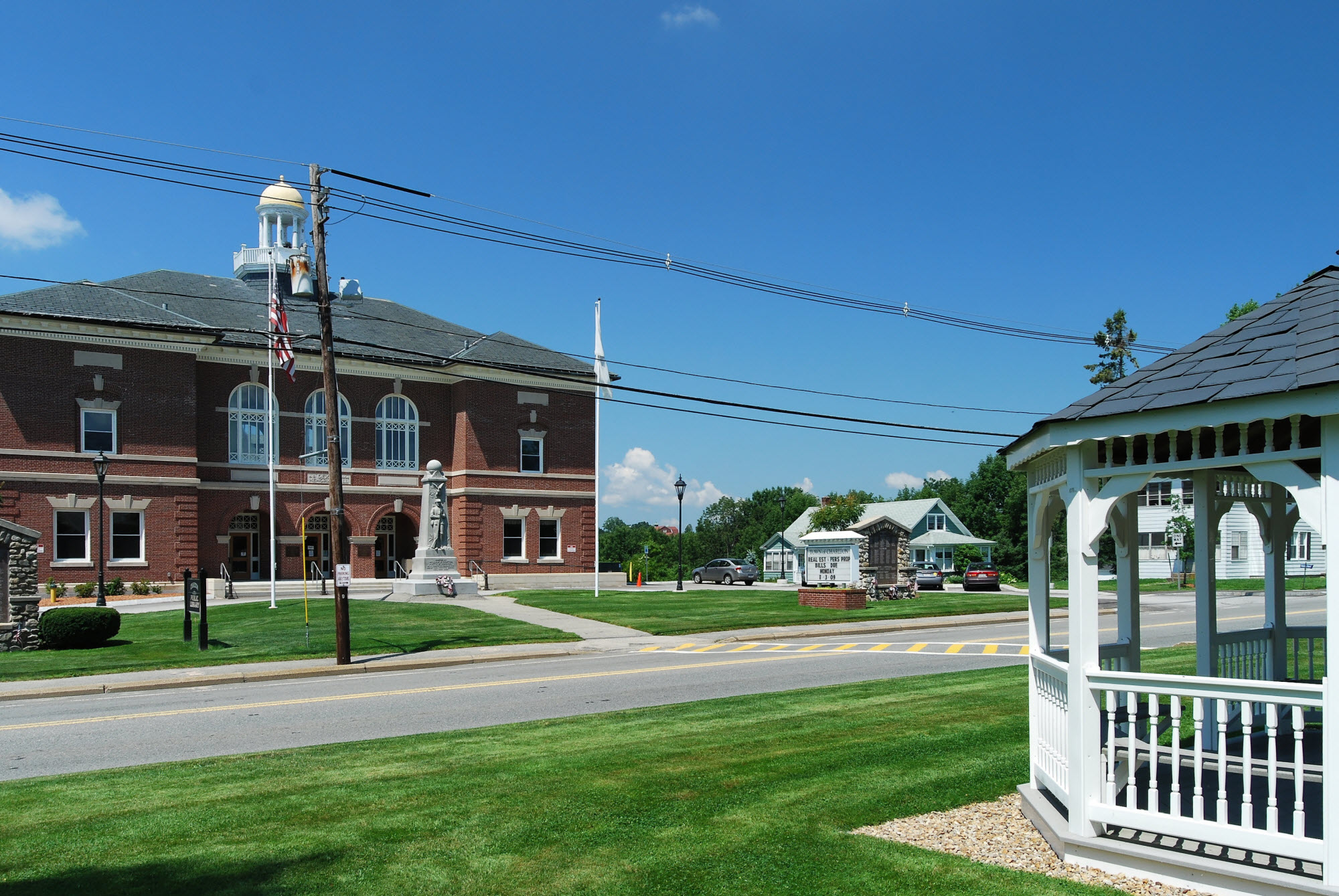

- Location within Massachusetts Location within the United States
- Location: Charlton, Massachusetts
- Coordinates: 42°8′2″N 71°58′9″W
- Architect: George H. Clemence, Frost, Briggs & Chamberlain
- Architectural style: Federal, Gothic Revival, Late Victorian
- NRHP reference No.: 95001227
- Added to NRHP: October 20, 1995

Charlton Center Historic District is an historic district roughly on Main Street from Mugget Hill Road to Masonic Home Road and adjacent roads in Charlton, Massachusetts. The district, which encompasses the historic center of the town, includes the first architect-designed building in the center, the Shingle style Overlook Hotel designed by Worcester architect George H. Clemence, as well as the 1905 Colonial Revival Town Hall designed by Frost, Briggs & Chamberlain. The town hall site is also home to a number of memorials to the town's military.

The district also features various Federal and Gothic Revival houses, and was added to the National Register of Historic Places in 1995.

== See also ==
- National Register of Historic Places listings in Worcester County, Massachusetts
