= Slater Building (Worcester, Massachusetts) =

- U.S. National Register of Historic Places
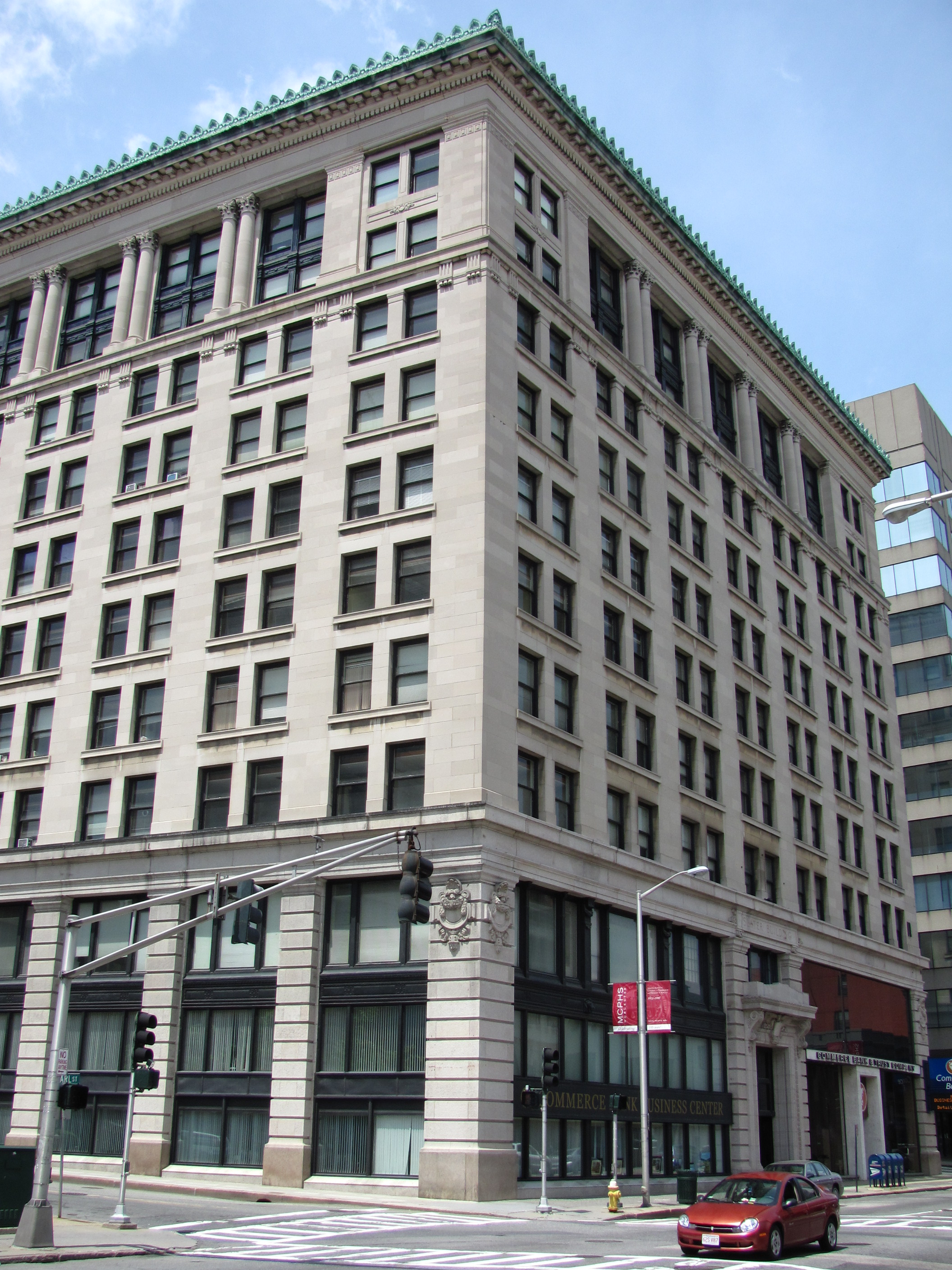
- Slater Building

- Location within Massachusetts Location within the United States
- Location: 390 Main St., Worcester, Massachusetts
- Coordinates: 42°15′51″N 71°48′9″W
- Built: 1907
- Architect: Frost, Briggs & Chamberlain
- Architectural style: Classical Revival
- MPS: Worcester MRA
- NRHP reference No.: 80000609
- Added to NRHP: March 05, 1980

The Slater Building is an historic commercial building at 390 Main Street in Worcester, Massachusetts. The ten story building, built in 1907 by the Norcross Brothers, was the second skyscraper in the city (after the Second State Mutual Life building, 340 Main Street). Framed in steel, the building is clad in granite stone on its first two floors, while the upper floors are faced in limestone. The upper two floors are set off from those below by a trim line, and have a recessed loggia framed by Corinthian columns.

In 1939 the building's interior systems were modernized by architects Frost, Chamberlain & Edwards, successors to the original designers, and then still tenants of the building.

The building was listed on the National Register of Historic Places in 1980. It is currently the 10th tallest building in Worcester.

== See also ==
- National Register of Historic Places listings in northwestern Worcester, Massachusetts
- National Register of Historic Places listings in Worcester County, Massachusetts
