= Sterling Center Historic District =

Historic district in Massachusetts, United States

- U.S. National Register of Historic Places
- U.S. Historic district
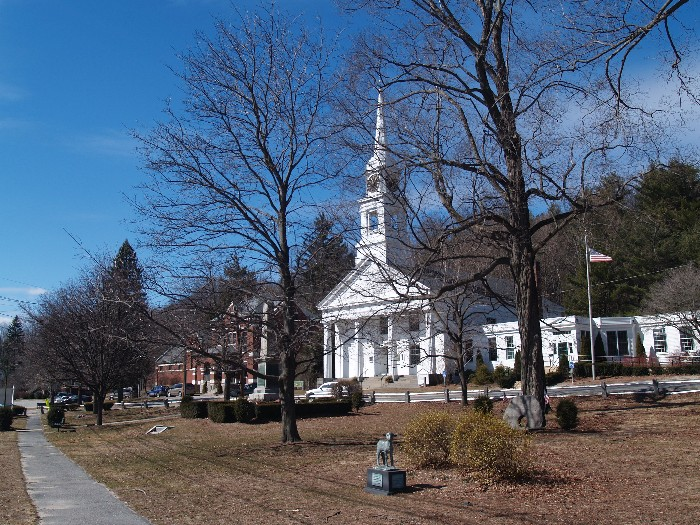
- Sterling Center

- Location within Massachusetts Location within the United States
- Location: Sterling, Massachusetts
- Coordinates: 42°26′10″N 71°45′41″W
- Architectural style: Greek Revival, Late Victorian, Federal
- NRHP reference No.: 88000425
- Added to NRHP: April 14, 1988

The Sterling Center Historic District is a historic district encompassing the central village of Sterling, Massachusetts. The district is roughly bounded by Meetinghouse Hill and Main, Maple and Kendall Hill, Boulding, Worcester and Princeton Street. The town common, which is the focal point of the district, was laid out in 1724, when the area was still part of Lancaster. The area includes 18th- and 19th-century houses, as well as several church buildings, and the 1835 town hall.

The district was added to the National Register of Historic Places in 1988.

== See also ==
- National Register of Historic Places listings in Worcester County, Massachusetts
