= Doyle Park =

Doyle Park may refer to:

- Doyle Community Park, in Santa Rosa, California
- Doyle Community Park & Center, in Leominster, Massachusetts
- Doyle Memorial Park, in Wishek, North Dakota
