= 2023 northeastern U.S. floods =

2023 northeastern U.S. floods may refer to:

- July 2023 Northeastern United States floods
- September 2023 northeastern U.S. floods
- September 2023 New York floods
