= Leominster High School =

- Home of the Blue Devils

Location
- 122 Granite Street; Leominster, Massachusetts; United States; 42.53423°N 71.77865°W

Information
- Type: Public; Open enrollment
- Motto: "Go Big Blue"
- Established: 1963
- Principal: Joshua Romano
- Staff: 94.86 (FTE)
- Grades: 9–12
- Enrollment: 1,880 (2023-24); 1073 LHS, 807 CTEi
- Student to teacher ratio: 10.90
- Colors: Blue & White
- Athletics: Football, Lacrosse, Basketball, Soccer
- Athletics conference: Midland Wachusett League
- Mascot: Blue Devil
- Rival: Fitchburg High School
- Alumni: LeominsterHigh.com
- Website: Leominster High School

Leominster High School (also known as Leominster High or LHS) is a public high school located in Leominster, Massachusetts, United States. It is the only secondary educational institution found in Leominster. It is situated in a mixed-industrial-residential section of Western Leominster in a 1960s era building.

== History ==
The original site for Leominster High School was located at the Carter Building. Located on West Street in Leominster, this building served as the public high school from 1909 to 1963. It later served as a junior high school and is currently used for apartments. The current location of Leominster High School, located at 122 Granite Street, was opened in the fall of 1963. It has since undergone major renovations, in 1977, 1990 and 2013.

Inside Leominster High School is the Aldrich V. Cousins Auditorium, named after a former educator who served the school for 32 years, 21 years as a teacher and 11 as principal. The auditorium was dedicated to Mr. Cousins in August 2000. Mr. Cousins began his teaching career at Leominster High School in 1947. He became the school's principal in 1968 and served in that position until his retirement in 1979. The auditorium is home to the Leominster High School Theatre Company, which produces four main stage productions per year.

== General information ==
Leominster High School comprises two units. It has an academic unit and a trade school, which is known as the Center for Technical Education Innovation (abbreviated CTEi). The majority of students are enrolled in the academic unit, although CTEi participation has been growing in recent years. Collectively, these two units are referred to as Leominster High School. In 2002, LHS had an enrollment of 1802 students, including freshmen, sophomores, juniors, and seniors. As of 2024, LHS has an enrollment of approximately 2,000 students. Leominster currently offers 19 Advanced Placement courses, 21 Honors level courses, and 12 Vocational shops.

== Athletics ==
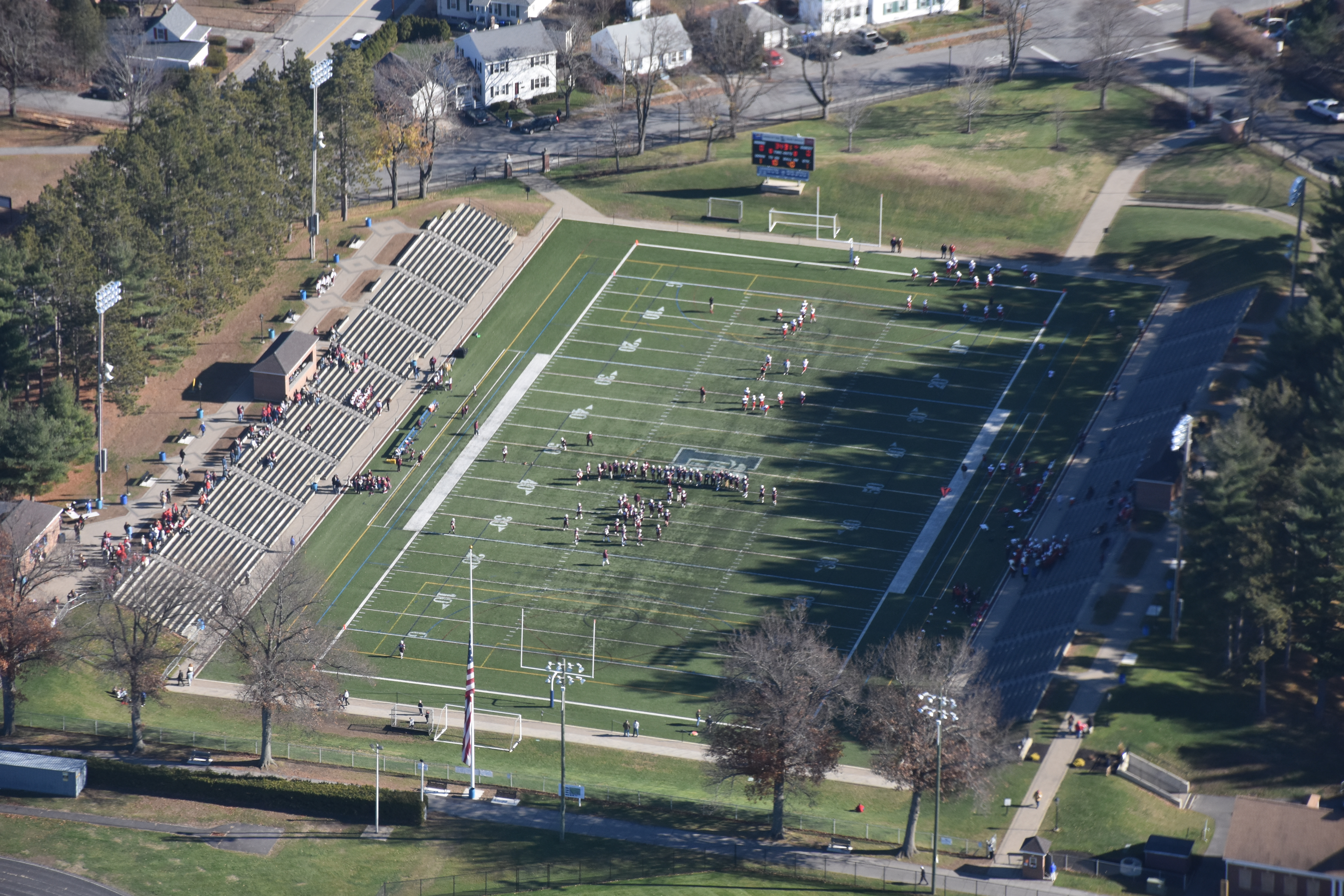
Leominster High School football field during Saturday morning game

Leominster High School is a participant in Massachusetts Interscholastic Athletic Association. Doyle Field, the school's sports complex located in downtown Leominster, underwent a major renovation from 2005 to 2006 though it still lacks adequate track and field facilities in order to host meets.

In addition to football, the school offers cross country, field hockey, girls and boys soccer, volleyball, girls and boys basketball, ice hockey, indoor track, outdoor track, girls and boys lacrosse, girls and boys tennis, softball, and baseball. Leominster High also is the home to the Marching Blue Devils. The band plays at all of the high school's home football games. They also perform at the city's patriotic events, including the Memorial Day and Veteran's Day ceremonies.

Most of Leominster's athletic teams play their home games at the high school itself or at the Doyle Field complex. The ice hockey team plays its home games in neighboring Fitchburg at the Wallace Civic Center.

Recent renovations have occurred at Doyle Field. The track is not being resurfaced and will be torn up in the next few years, due to a heavy focus on football. This will leave the Leominster High School track team, which already cannot have home meets because of the poor condition of the track, without a practice track, until the completion of a new track and field on site at the high school.

== Notable alumni ==
- Herbert Reiner Jr., ('33) American diplomat, who captured Mahatma Gandhi's killer in New Delhi, India, in January 1948.
- Alex Walsh (‘97) 1x loser of D3 state title hockey 1996.
- James Nachtwey ('66) – Award-winning war photographer.
- [ Jim Remy ] (‘72) President PGA of America 2008-2010
- R.A. Salvatore ('77) – Well-known science fiction novelist
- Mark Osowski ('81) – former NBA assistant coach for the New Orleans Hornets (then Charlotte Hornets), the Golden State Warriors, and the Cleveland Cavaliers.
- Markus Schulz ('87) – Music producer
- Keith Beauregard ('01) - baseball player
- Mark Daigneault ('03) – American basketball coach, currently the head coach of the Oklahoma City Thunder of the National Basketball Association.
- Paul DiGiovanni ('06) – Guitarist of the pop-punk band Boys Like Girls
- Paul Florence – American football player and coach
- Frank Novak – American football coach
- Adrian Nicole LeBlanc – American journalist, recipient of the MacArthur Fellowship
- Matt Kelly – Drummer for the Dropkick Murphy's
- Noah Gray - NFL tight end
- Al Spalding, naval architect
