= Bernard W. Doyle =

American industrialist and philanthropist

- Born: 1873; Leominster, Massachusetts
- Died: December 26, 1949 (aged 76); Leominster, Massachusetts, United States
- Occupation(s): Business magnate, Philanthropist
- Spouse(s): Elizabeth Haley, Rachel Butler (1949-1949)
- Children: Marjorie Doyle Rockwell, Louise Doyle.

Bernard Wendaell Doyle (1873 – December 26, 1949) was an American industrialist and philanthropist. In 1901, Doyle cofounded the Viscoloid Company in Leominster, Massachusetts. Doyle helped pioneer the use of pyroxylin plastic for making hair combs and accessories. Soon the Viscoloid Company would expand into a range of products and became one of the leading pyroxlyin plastic manufactures in the country. Doyle would also help found the Merchants National Bank of Leominster in 1912. By 1923, Doyle had become chief executive of the entire Viscoloid Company and by that same year, the company had a capital of three million dollars and employed over 60% of the Leominster workforce. In 1925, he sold his interest of the Viscoloid Company to Dupont de Nemours. Bernard Doyle remained on as vice-president of the renamed Dupont Viscoloid Company until his retirement. The Leominster complex was also renamed the “Doyle Works” of the Dupont Viscoloid Company. Throughout his life Bernard Doyle was one of the most prominent and philanthropic citizens Central Massachusetts has ever seen. He served as the second Leominster city mayor from 1920 to 1924, as well as donating the entire Doyle Field athletic complex to the city in 1931. He also contributed generously to Leominster Hospital, the Notown Reservoir, St. Leo's Church in Leominster and countless other ventures throughout north central Massachusetts. At the time of his death, Doyle was a director of the Merchants National Bank of Boston, Boston Edison Company, Boston and Maine Railroad, Massachusetts Life Insurance Company of Springfield, member of the Finance Committee of the United States Rubber Company, directory of the Safety Fund National Bank of Fitchburg, and vice-president of the Independent Lock Company of Fitchburg. Doyle was also a trustee of both Northeastern University and Cushing Academy. Bernard Doyle first married Elizabeth Haley, together they had two daughters: Marjorie Doyle Rockwell and Louise Doyle. After his wife's death, Doyle remarried in 1949 to Rachel Butler. Bernard Doyle died on December 26, 1949.
