= North Leominster =

Village in Massachusetts, United States

Coordinates: 42.54°N 71.74°W

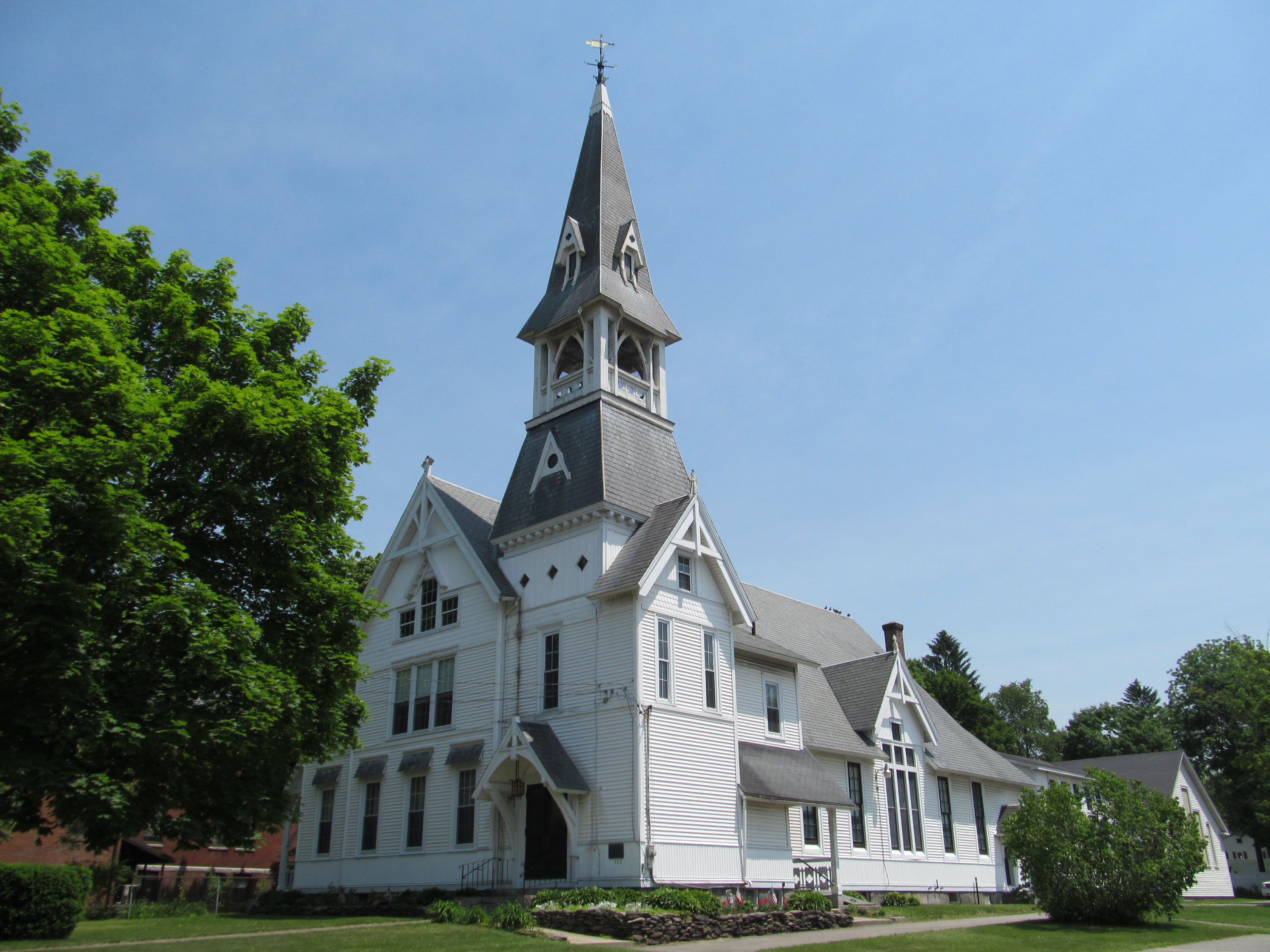
Congregational Church of Christ

North Leominster is a village or neighborhood of the city of Leominster, Massachusetts. Settlement started in 1725, and by 1740 Leominster was separated from the town of Lancaster, Massachusetts. Settlers north of North Nashua River were in the North village. The name changed over time from North Village to North Leominster.

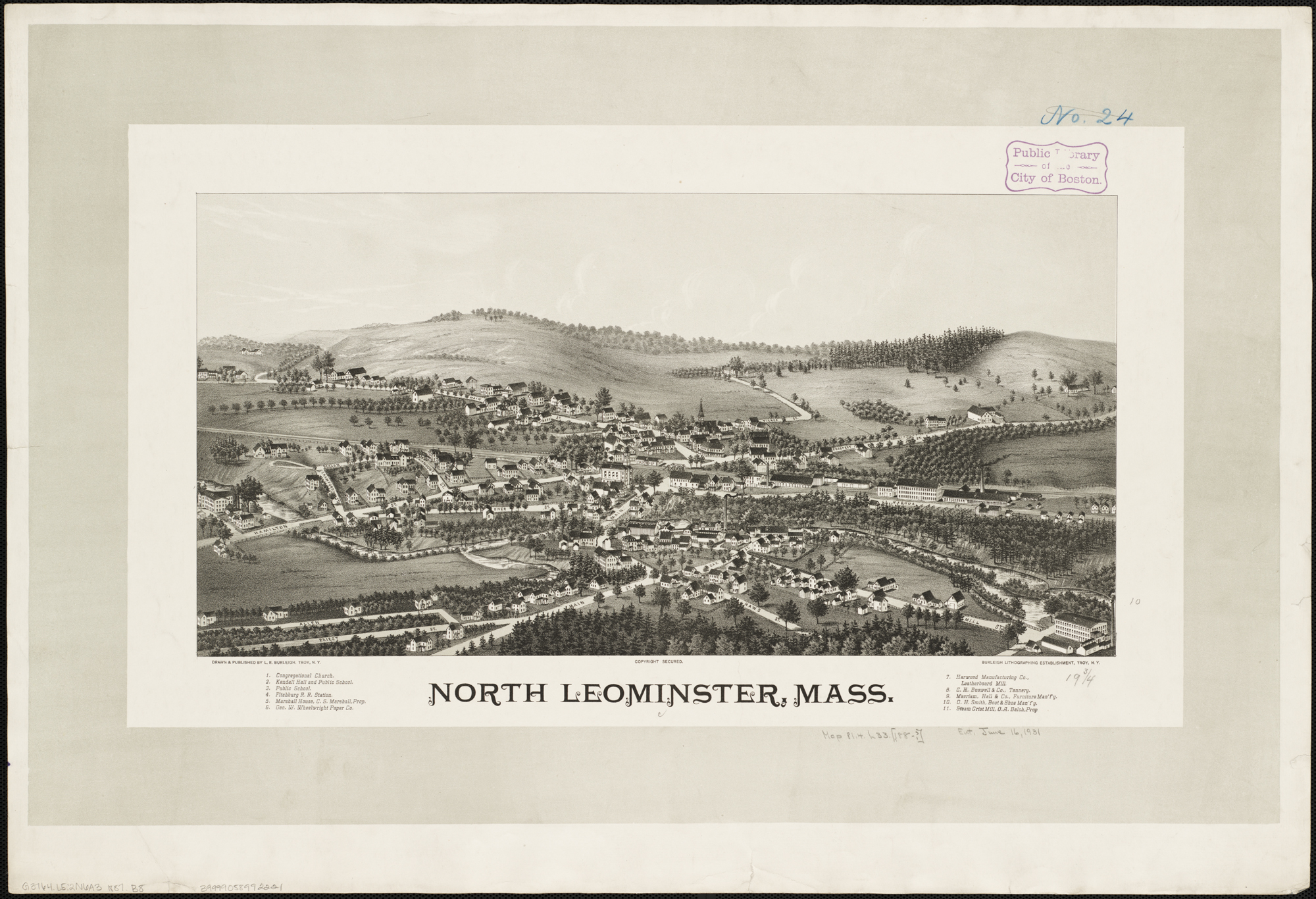
Print of North Leominster by R.L. Burleigh with listing of landmarks

In 1851, a new post office was established in North Leominster giving itself the feel as a separate town. In 1845, when the railroad from Boston was extended to Fitchburg it ran through the North Village parallel to the river.

In 2005, the MBTA finished construction of a new commuter rail station at North Leominster on the Fitchburg Line from Boston. North Leominster is accessible from the Lancaster, MA line on MA Route 2 by taking the exit for Harvard Street, or from the exit for Massachusetts Route 13. North Leominster contains one elementary school, Johhny Appleseed Elementary, named after fold hero Johnny appleseed who was born as John Chapman in Leominster, and one middle school, Sky View Middle School.
