= Leominster, Massachusetts =

City in Massachusetts, United States

- City
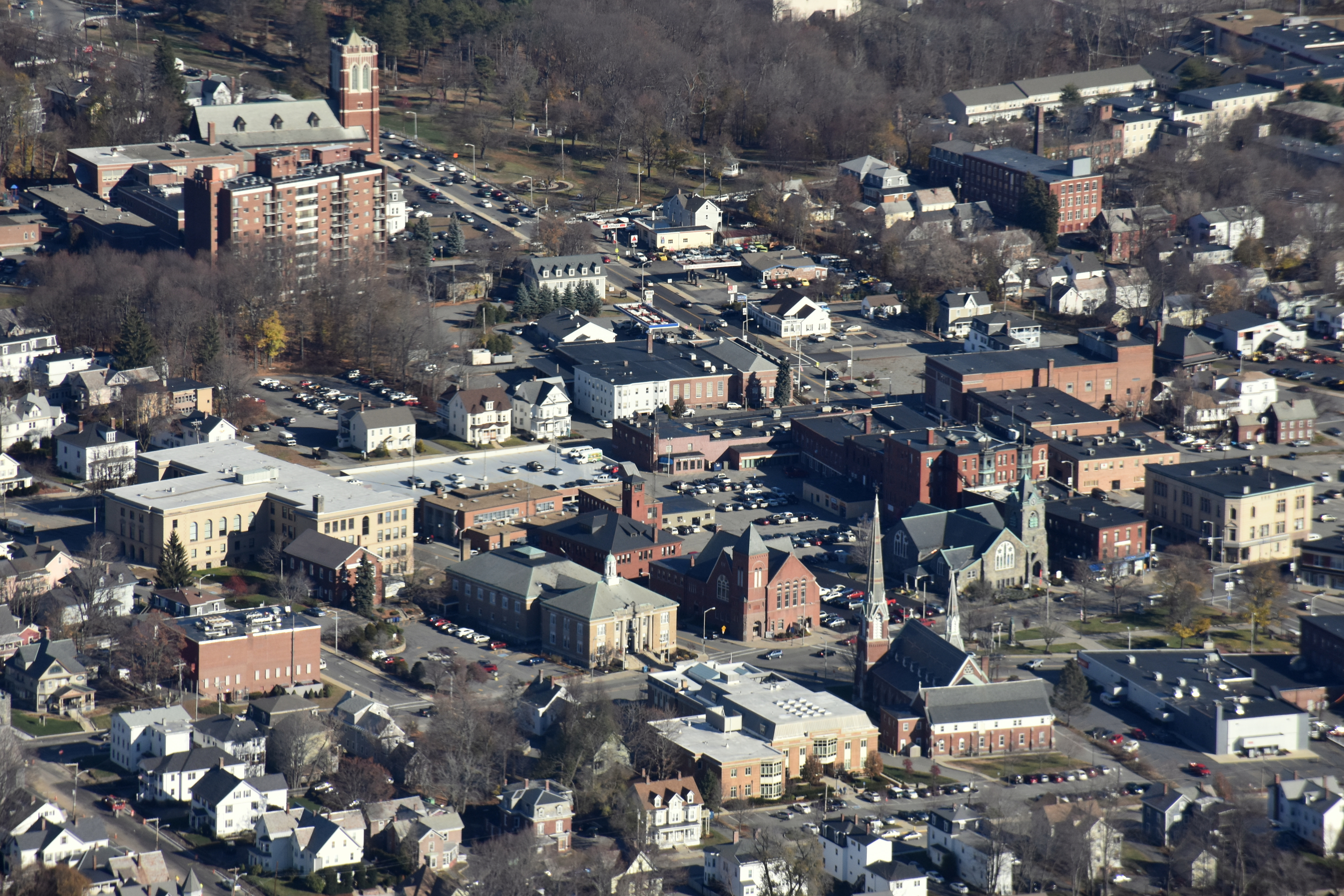
- Downtown Leominster

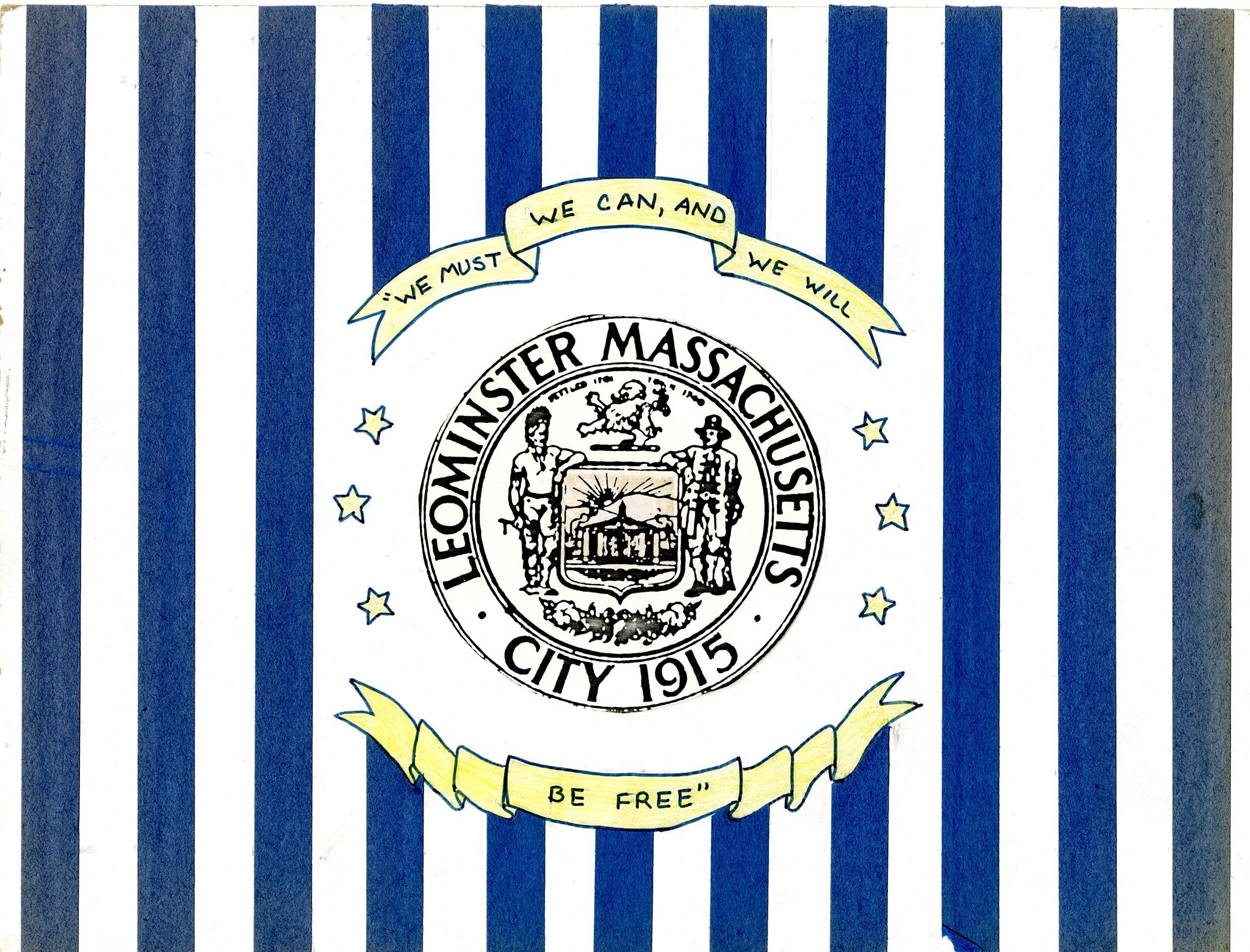
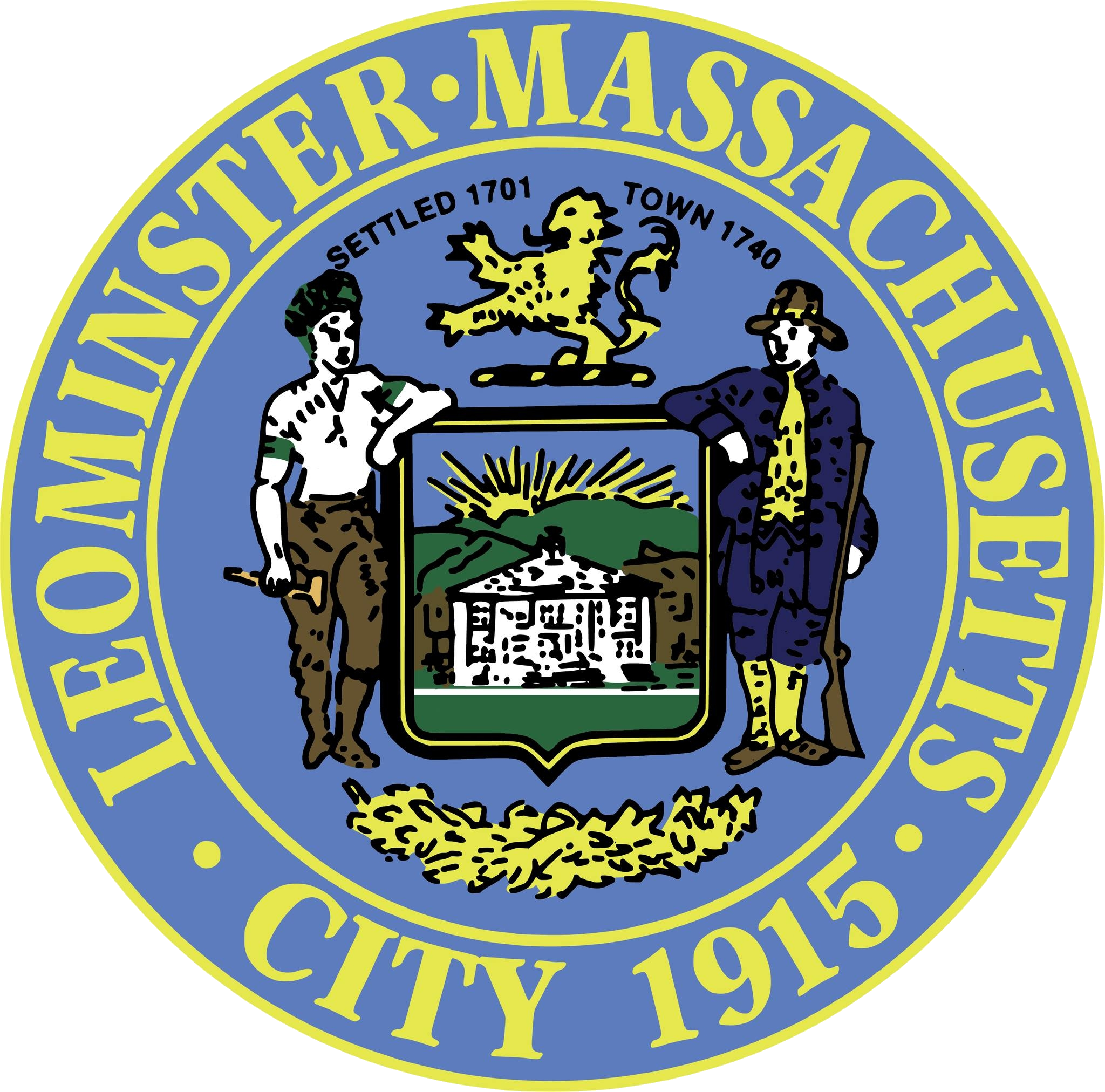
- Flag Seal
- Nicknames: Pioneer Plastics City (Note: For examples of Leominster's early plastics industry, see Viscoloid, Foster Grant, Don Featherstone (artist), as well as the article for plastic flamingos.); The Birthplace of Johnny Appleseed
- Motto: We Must, We Can and We Will Be Free.
- Location in Worcester County and the state of Massachusetts

- Location in the United States of America
- Coordinates: 42°31′30″N 71°45′37″W
- Country: United States
- State: Massachusetts
- County: Worcester
- Settled: 1640
- Incorporated: Jun 23, 1740 (T); Nov 2, 1915 (C)

Government
  - Type: Mayor-council city
  - Mayor: Dean J. Mazzarella
  - City Council: Susan A. Chalifoux Zephir; Brandon L. Robbins; Thomas F. Ardinger; Claire M. Freda; Eladia Romero (Ward 1); Pauline M. Cormier (Ward 2); David R. Cormier (Ward 3); Mark C. Bodanza (Ward 4); Carrie Noseworthy (Ward 5)
  - School Committee: Mayor Dean Mazzerella; Gregory K. Thomas; Caleb Weldon; Salvatore Perla; Jennifer Lee Alker (Ward 1); Ronald Houle (Ward 2); Sandra Cucchiara(Ward 3); Joshua Bowdridge (Ward 4); Eileen Griffin (Ward 5)

Area
  - Total: 29.68 sq mi (76.87 km^{2})
  - Land: 28.82 sq mi (74.65 km^{2})
  - Water: 0.86 sq mi (2.22 km^{2})
- Elevation: 404 ft (123 m)

Population (2020)census.gov
  - Total: 43,782
  - Density: 1,519.0/sq mi (586.49/km^{2})
- Time zone: UTC−5 (Eastern)
  - Summer (DST): UTC−4 (Eastern)
- ZIP Code: 01453
- Area code: 508/978
- FIPS code: 25-35075
- GNIS feature ID: 0617697
- Website: www.leominster-ma.gov

Leominster (/ˈlɛmənstər/ LEM-ən-stər) is a city in Worcester County, Massachusetts, United States. It is the second-most populous city in Worcester County, with a population of 44,209 at the 2024 census estimate. Leominster is located north of Worcester and northwest of Boston. Both Route 2 and Route 12 pass through Leominster. Interstate 190, Route 13, and Route 117 all have starting/ending points in Leominster. Leominster is bounded by Fitchburg and Lunenburg to the north, Lancaster to the east, Sterling and Princeton to the south, and Westminster to the west.

== History ==
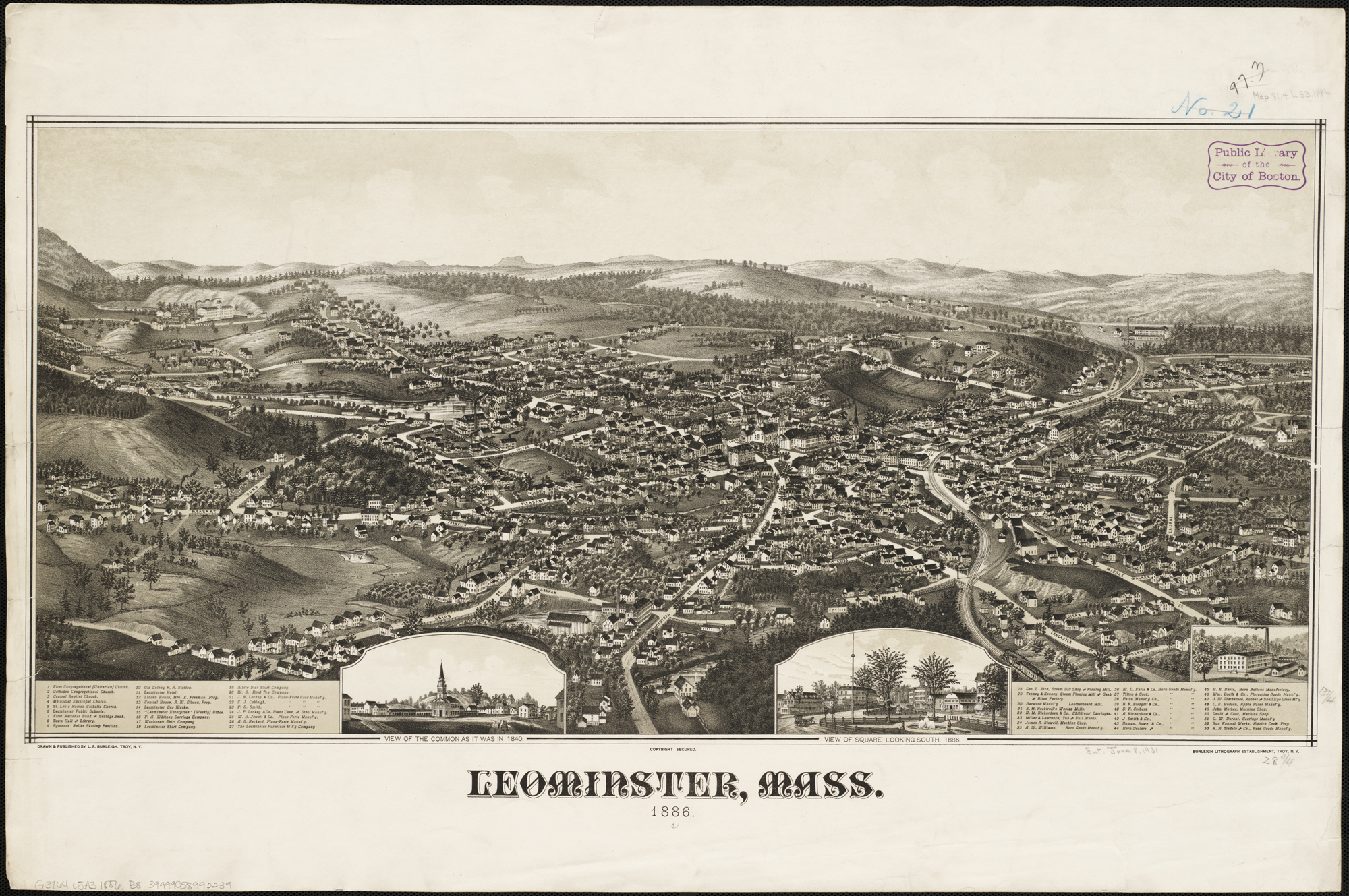
Lithograph of Leominster from 1886 by L. R. Burleigh with list of landmarks and depictions of town square and Commons areas

The region was originally inhabited by various divisions of the Pennacook or Nipmuc Native Americans, who lived along the Nashua River. The river provided fertile soil for the cultivation of corn, beans, squash and tobacco. European settlers began arriving in the mid-17th century and in 1653, the area of Leominster—which takes it name from the Herefordshire town of Leominster in England, was first founded as part of the town of Lancaster.

The European settlers and native people lived peacefully for a number of years, until the start of King Philip's War in 1675. The violent war between the native Indians and early settlers killed hundreds of people and drove off the inhabitants from the area. After the war, Lancaster remained virtually deserted until a new land grant was offered to residents in 1701. To prevent further conflict with the native Indians, the settlers negotiated with Chief Sholan and his nephew George Tahanto of the Nashaway tribe for the land. It would be the only parcel of land to be legally purchased in Central Massachusetts.

By 1737, the area of Leominster had gained enough residents to be incorporated as a separate town. The town of Leominster was officially incorporated on June 23, 1740.

Around the time of the Civil War, Leominster was a major contributor in the Underground Railroad. The Emory Stearn Schoolhouse and the John Drake home, led anti-slavery campaigns and helped house fugitive slaves.

In Leominster's early existence, the town was primarily a small farming community, but towards the beginning of the 19th century, the economy quickly shifted into manufacturing. The town became a regional transportation hub around 1800, with the opening of the Fifth Massachusetts Turnpike and the connections of the Union Turnpike and Cambridge and Concord Turnpikes in 1808. However, manufacturing in Leominster was truly made possible by the opening of the Fitchburg Railroad that ran through North Leominster and into Boston, and the Fitchburg and Worcester Railroad that ran through the center of town. By the 1850s, paper mills, piano makers, and comb manufacturers had established factories along the Monoosnoc Brook and Nashua River. While the earliest settlers in Leominster were primarily of British ancestry, many immigrants soon gathered to work in Leominster's expanding factories. The first group of immigrants was primarily Irish, followed by the French Canadians and the Italians into the early 20th century. These new waves of immigrants caused the population to surge from just 2,069 in 1840 to 19,744 by 1920. On November 2, 1915, Leominster was officially chartered as a city.

While many different industries established themselves in Leominster, it was the comb industry that particularly flourished. Construction of combs was a time-consuming and painstaking process, involving preparation of the natural materials such as animal horn, roughing out of a basic form, and finally, individual cutting of the teeth. By 1853, there were already 146 employees working in 24 different comb factories across the town. By the mid-1800s, however, availability of the natural materials used to make combs, such as animal horns and hooves, was diminishing rapidly, and an alternative material was needed.

The solution would come in a new material called celluloid invented in 1868. The new plastic would revolutionize the comb industry and give Leominster the nickname the "Comb City". The versatility of celluloid would also give manufactures the opportunity to expand to many different products outside of combs. The largest plastic manufacturer in the city was the Viscoloid Company founded by Bernard Wendell Doyle in 1901. In 1914, the Viscoloid Company pioneered making toys out of pyroxylin plastic, and by 1923 the company was the largest employer in Leominster. Viscoloid was sold to The DuPont Company in 1925, and renamed the Dupont Viscoloid Company.

The second invention to revolutionize plastic production in Leominster was the development of modern injection molding. Samuel Foster, a Leominster resident of German ancestry, first worked for the Viscoloid Company, then established his own business, Foster Grant. In 1931, Foster visited Jack Goodman's New York factory and learned about an injection molding machine, invented in Germany in the early 1920s. Foster ordered several of the new machines, and had them secretly shipped via Worcester to his Foster Grant manufacturing factory in Leominster, where his mechanics focused on getting them to work and modifying them. Molding technology made it possible for Foster Grant to make not only combs, but a wide variety of other articles, including plastic sunglasses, selling 20 million pair in 1937. The new technology would pay great dividends for the plastic industry in the city and the country. Soon the city would be coined the "Pioneer Plastics City" for its important history in the plastics industry.

Leominster was also the home of Tupperware, founded in 1938 by Earl Tupper. His "wonderbowl," with its airtight "burping" seal became popular after Brownie Wise convinced him to demonstrate and sell Tupperware at home parties.

Leominster also boasted large manufactures Standard Tool Company, Selig Manufacturing Co. Inc, C.E. Buckley, Inc. (manufacturer of religious articles) and the Whitney Carriage Company, which was once the largest manufacturer of baby carriages in the world.

In 1956, the plastic pink flamingo lawn-ornament was invented in Leominster for Union Products. The famous lawn-ornament was designed by Don Featherstone, and was modelled after pictures of flamingos in National Geographic.

Although the Great Depression slowed the plastic industry in Leominster, it was not until the late 20th century that there was a full-scale decline in plastic manufacturing. Following the national trend, manufactures were moving out of the cities to cheaper alternatives across the country and overseas. Despite the changing landscape, the population of Leominster would continually rise into the 21st century, surpassing her twin city of Fitchburg in 2000 as the second largest city in Worcester County. The Latino communities of Leominster also saw huge growth towards the latter half of the 20th century.

In recent decades, Route 2 and the building of I-190 have further transformed the city into a more commercial and suburban landscape. The construction of the Twin City Plaza, Mall at Whitney Field and other shopping centers have all contributed to significant commercial growth in the city and have made Leominster one of Central Massachusetts' largest retail destination. Inexpensive land cost has also made the city an attractive living destination for commuters to both Worcester and Boston. Nevertheless, Leominster still preserves some of its manufacturing heritage and many plastic manufactures retain establishment in the city.

On September 11, 2023, heavy rains caused significant floods, leading to major damage to the city, and a state of emergency was declared.

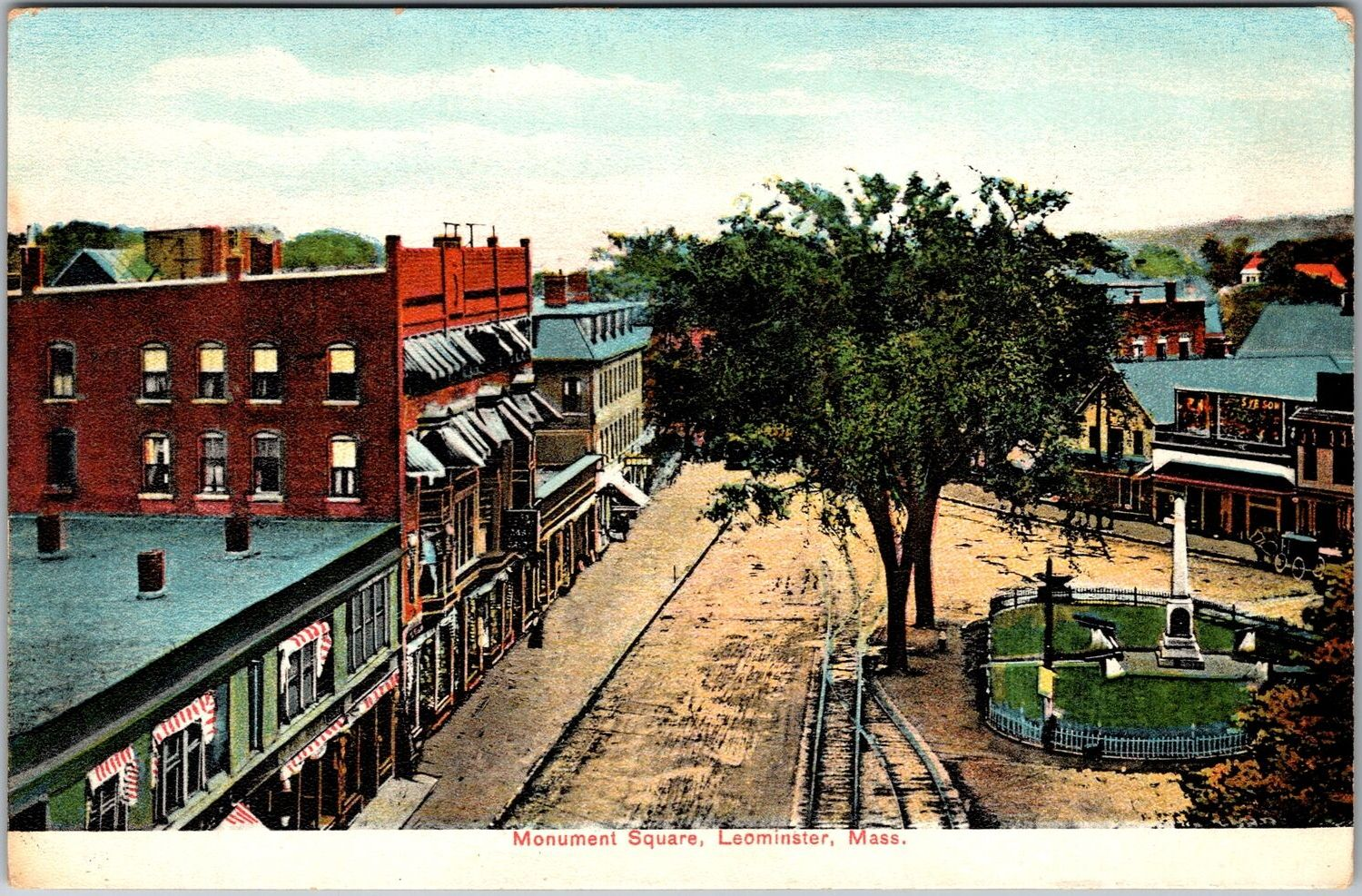
Monument Square in 1907

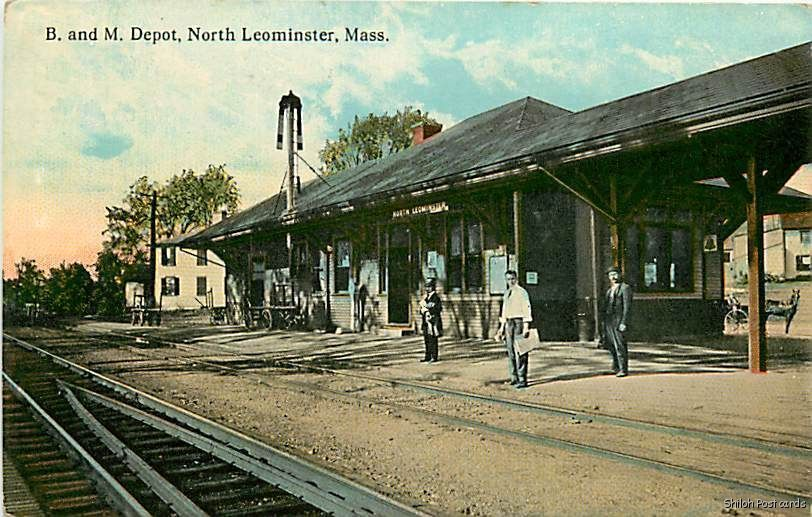
North Leominster train depot in 1915

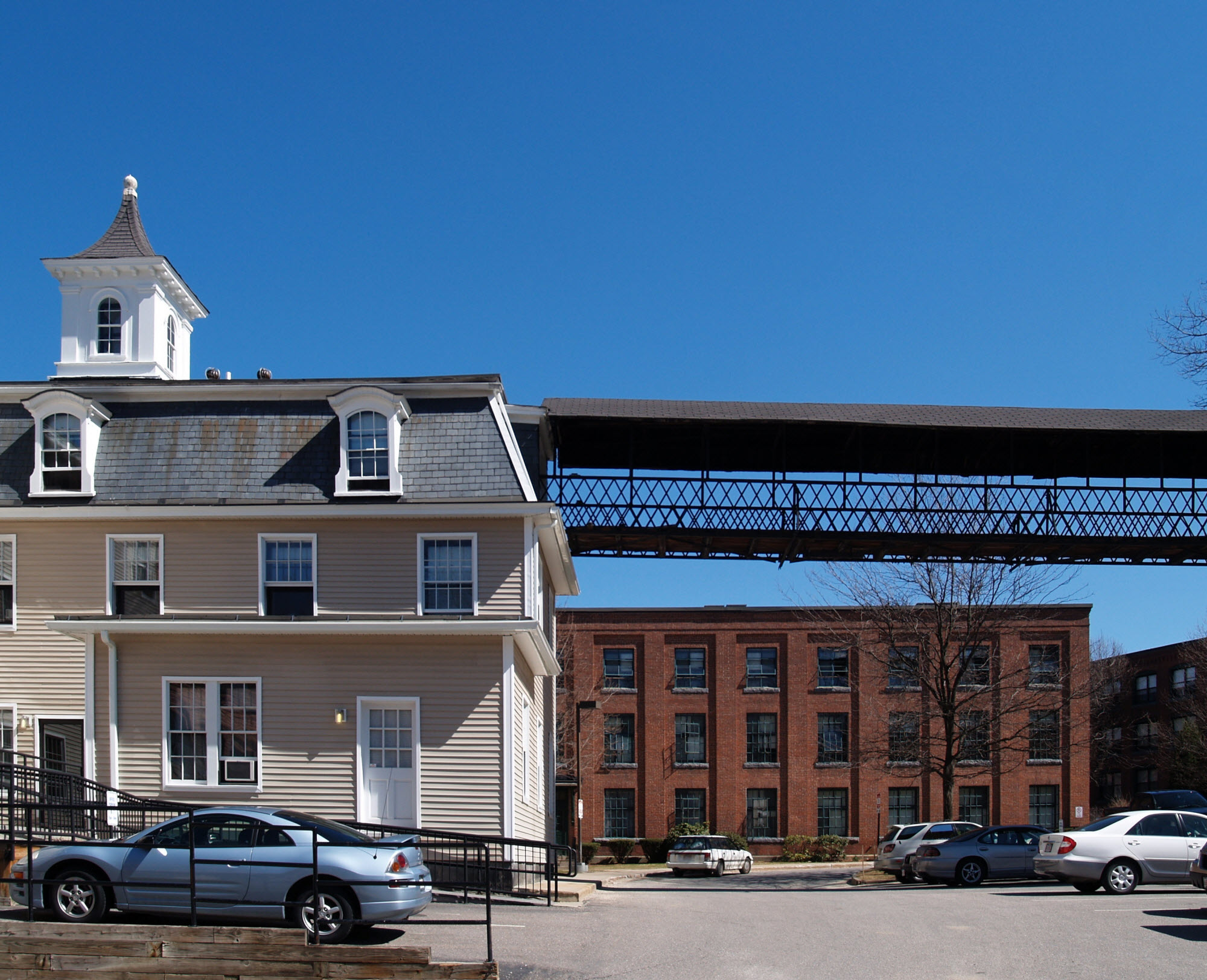
The former Whitney Carriage Company complex

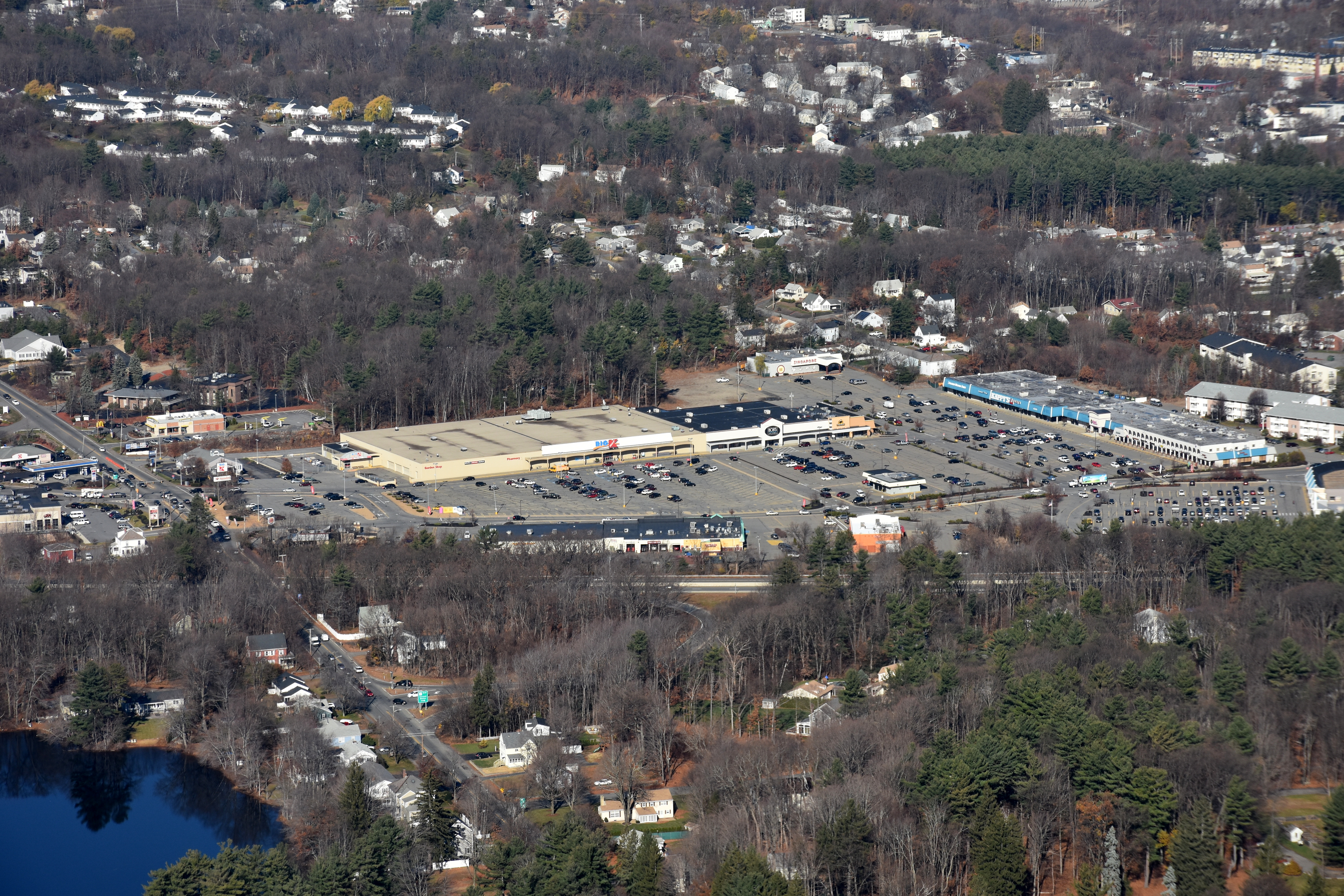
Twin City Plaza mall on Route 2

== Geography ==
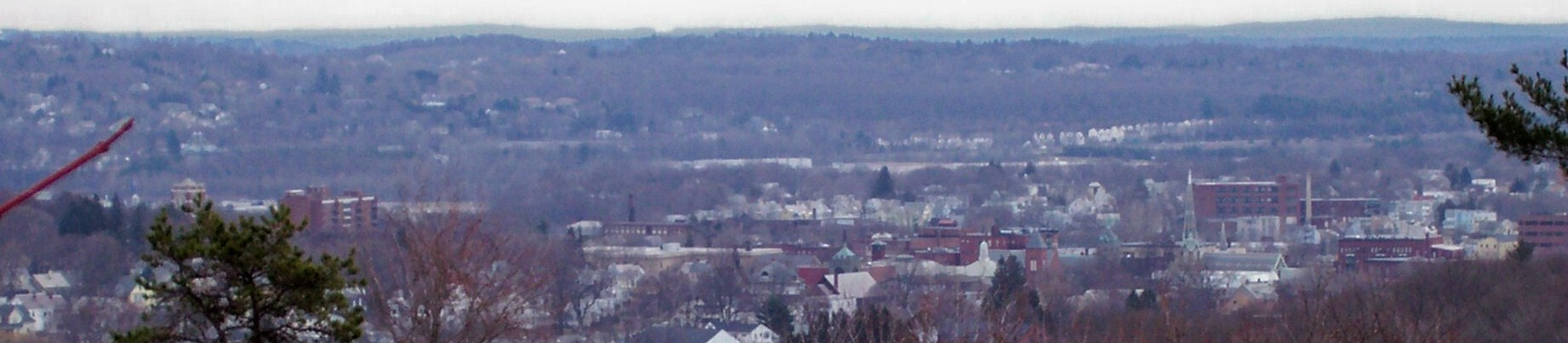
View of Downtown Leominster

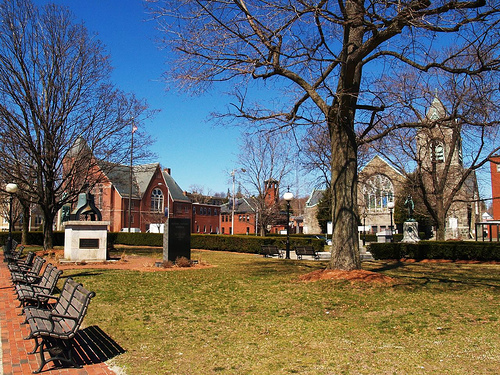
View across Monument Square in downtown Leominster, the site of the city's traditional New England common

According to the United States Census Bureau, the city has a total area of 29.8 square miles (77 km^{2}), of which 28.9 square miles (75 km^{2}) is land and 0.9 square miles (2.3 km^{2}), or 2.96%, is water.

Leominster is primarily located on a plateau above the Nashua River. The river runs through the eastern portion of the city and then cuts through the northern part of the city as it meanders towards Fitchburg. Northern and Western Leominster have a more rugged terrain defined by scattered hills. The most prominent hills are both the North and South Monoosnoc Hills in the western part of the city. The South Monoosnoc Hill is the highest point in the town at 1,020 feet. In the 19th century, the south hill was quarried for granite used in home foundations. West of the two hills lies the No town Reservoir and Leominster State Forest. To the east, lies the Monoosnoc Brook which winds through the center of town and was an important power source for early manufacturers.

=== Villages ===
The city is divided into several small "villages" such as French Hill, a large hill covered in planned blocks of "triple decker" apartment houses located from 1st Street to 12th Street. It is called French Hill because this is where the large immigrant French population took root. In the early 20th century, on Lincoln Terrace, immigrating Italian families began to arrive in the area and built a semi-closed society which existed for many years. The French population built a new church and moved closer to it. Other areas include Morse Hollow, North Leominster, Rice Hill, the Flats, the Bowery, the West Side, and the Car Barn area, located along the Fitchburg border, so-called because the Fitchburg & Leominster Railway trolley cars were stored and maintained in this area. It now has buses. A granite marker showing the birthplace of Johnny Appleseed can be found on Johnny Appleseed Lane.

== Demographics ==
Historical population
Year	Pop.	±%
1790	1,189	—
1800	1,486	+25.0%
1810	1,584	+6.6%
1820	1,790	+13.0%
1830	1,861	+4.0%
1840	2,069	+11.2%
1850	3,121	+50.8%
1860	3,522	+12.8%
1870	3,894	+10.6%
1880	5,772	+48.2%
1890	7,269	+25.9%
1900	12,392	+70.5%
1910	17,580	+41.9%
1920	19,744	+12.3%
1930	21,810	+10.5%
1940	22,226	+1.9%
1950	24,075	+8.3%
1960	27,929	+16.0%
1970	32,939	+17.9%
1980	34,508	+4.8%
1990	38,145	+10.5%
2000	41,303	+8.3%
2010	40,759	−1.3%
2020	43,782	+7.4%
2024*	44,209	+1.0%
* = population estimate. Source: United States census records and Population Estimates Program data. Source: U.S. Decennial Census

=== 2020 census ===
As of the 2020 census, Leominster had a population of 43,782. The median age was 40.9 years. 20.3% of residents were under the age of 18 and 16.9% of residents were 65 years of age or older. For every 100 females there were 93.5 males, and for every 100 females age 18 and over there were 90.6 males age 18 and over.

97.5% of residents lived in urban areas, while 2.5% lived in rural areas.

There were 17,873 households in Leominster, of which 28.5% had children under the age of 18 living in them. Of all households, 42.6% were married-couple households, 18.9% were households with a male householder and no spouse or partner present, and 30.1% were households with a female householder and no spouse or partner present. About 29.9% of all households were made up of individuals and 12.3% had someone living alone who was 65 years of age or older.

There were 18,732 housing units, of which 4.6% were vacant. The homeowner vacancy rate was 0.8% and the rental vacancy rate was 4.1%.

Racial composition as of the 2020 census
Race	Number	Percent
White	29,660	67.7%
Black or African American	3,053	7.0%
American Indian and Alaska Native	141	0.3%
Asian	1,391	3.2%
Native Hawaiian and Other Pacific Islander	13	0.0%
Some other race	4,087	9.3%
Two or more races	5,437	12.4%
Hispanic or Latino (of any race)	8,268	18.9%

=== 2010 census ===
Hispanic or Latino of any race were 11.00% of the population (7.9% Puerto Rican, 2.0% Uruguayan, 1.1% Dominican, 0.7% Mexican, 0.3% Guatemalan, 0.3% Colombian).

=== 2000 census ===
As of the 2000 census, there were 41,303 people, 16,491 households, and 10,900 families residing in the city. The population density was 1,430.3 inhabitants per square mile (552.2/km^{2}). There were 16,976 housing units at an average density of 587.9 per square mile (227.0/km^{2}). The racial makeup of the city was 81.50% White, 3.70% African American, 0.15% Native American, 2.44% Asian, 0.06% Pacific Islander, 4.32% from other races, and 2.21% from two or more races.

There were 16,491 households, out of which 32.9% had children under the age of 18 living with them, 49.5% were married couples living together, 12.5% had a female householder with no husband present, and 33.9% were non-families. Of all households 27.9% were made up of individuals, and 10.7% had someone living alone who was 65 years of age or older. The average household size was 2.48 and the average family size was 3.05.

In the city, the population was spread out, with 25.5% under the age of 18, 7.2% from 18 to 24, 32.4% from 25 to 44, 21.3% from 45 to 64, and 13.6% who were 65 years of age or older. The median age was 36 years. For every 100 females, there were 92.6 males. For every 100 females age 18 and over, there were 88.1 males.

The median income for a household in the city was $44,893, and the median income for a family was $54,660. Males had a median income of $41,013 versus $30,201 for females. The per capita income for the city was $21,769. About 7.2% of families and 9.5% of the population were below the poverty line, including 12.0% of those under age 18 and 9.4% of those age 65 or over.

== Economy ==
As of 2000, the management and professional fields were the city's largest sector, and employed over 32% of Leominster's workforce. 26.8% of the workforce is employed in sales and office occupations, and 20.2% are employed in education, health and social services. Manufacturing constitutes 25.5% of the city's employees. Of workers 84.3% commute alone to the workplace, and 9.1% carpool, while 1.7% use public transportation and another 1.7% walk. The average one-way commute time is about 25 minutes. Soy product manufacturer Nasoya was founded here in 1978 until it was acquired by Vitasoy and relocated in 1998.

== Culture ==
Leominster has a long cultural history including various theatres, performance groups, exhibits and entertainment events. The Leominster Colonial Band, founded by Italian immigrants in 1910, has presented a free summer concerts series since the 1930s. Their annual Christmas concert, begun in 1990, is a favorite city tradition. Since 1973, the Thayer Symphony Orchestra has been performing in Central Massachusetts. Composed of orchestra professional, community volunteers, and student musicians, Thayer Symphony Orchestra's popularity forced them to move to the Stratos Dukakis Performing Arts Center at Montachusett Regional Vocational School in Fitchburg in 2000. The Orchestra's concerts sell-out annually. Since 1996, the Central Massachusetts Repertory Theater has performed at the Congregation Agudat Achim synagogue in Leominster. The Leominster Art Association promotes the arts in Leominster from their home on Route 13. Every spring, the Association holds a three-day exhibition of local art downtown at St. Leo's Church. At the exhibition, a high school senior from Central Massachusetts is award a $500 scholarship annually to continue their art education

The Starburst Festival is held every June at Doyle Field. The festival includes live entertainment, concessions, musical presentations, and a band concert by the Starburst Orchestra and fireworks, drawing over 8,000 visitors each year. The Leominster "citizens of the Year" awards are also presented to one man and one woman resident during the festival.

In September, Leominster hosts the Johnny Appleseed Festival in celebration of the fall season and city's local hero Johnny Appleseed. Held at Monument Square since 1994, the festival features crafts, booths, entertainment and a parade. The festival boasts over a hundred local booths, and a food court sponsored by local restaurants and multicultural groups. Leominster was formerly home to the National Plastics Center and Museum, until the museum closed in 2008.

=== Recreation ===
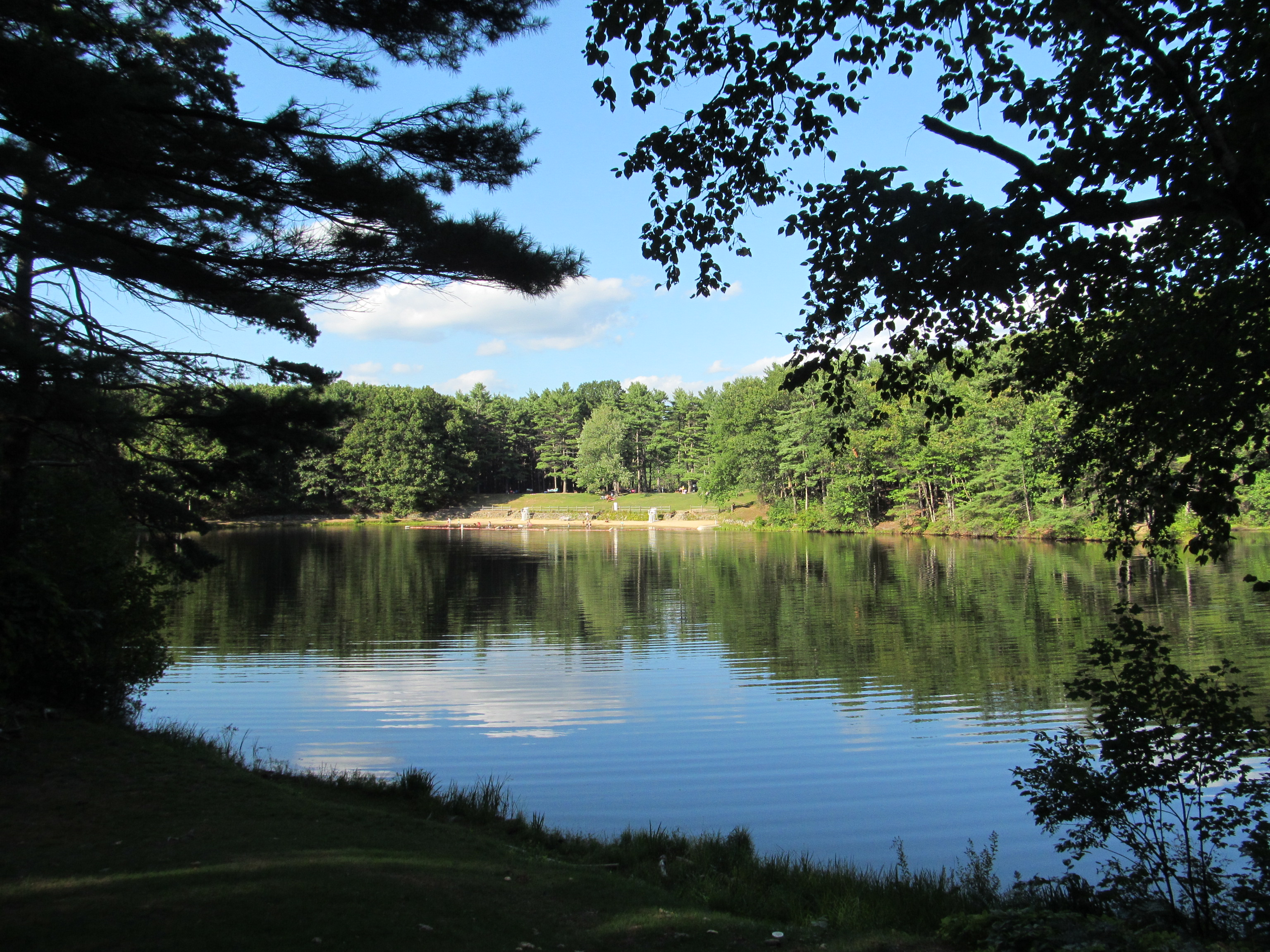
Crow Hill Pond at Leominster State Forest

The Leominster Recreation Department maintains 103 acres of property in Leominster, including numerous parks and playgrounds. Notable parks include Monument Square, Arthur A. Fournier Sr. Memorial Park, Evelyn Hachey Park, Justin DeSantis Field, Bachand Field and Barrett Park, which houses the Recreation Department's main offices. Doyle Field, located downtown on Priest Street, is the city's main athletic complex, including eight tennis courts, a soccer field and track, baseball field, playground, combination football-soccer stadium, and clubhouse. Dedicated in 1931, Doyle field opened with a seating capacity of 6,200 and temporary bleachers for nearly 10,000 spectators. In 2005, the field went under a huge renovation project to be completed in 2020. The project was broken up into three phases and phases 1 and 2 have been mostly completed through 2012. The renovation has costs $5 million through 2012. The renovation includes replacing bleachers, installing new turf, new locker rooms, concessions, press box, entertainment pavilion, ticket booths and expanding seating capacity from 4,572 to 6,912 seats.

The Doyle Community Park & Center is a 167-acre open-space reservation managed by the Trustees of Reservation. The reservation includes the Doyle Conservation center which houses the trustees Central Massachusetts headquarters, conference meeting rooms, and serves as an event venue.

The city is also home to the 4,300-acre Leominster State Forest, a popular hiking destination. Within the state forest are Crow Hill Pond and Paradise Pond, both popular summer picnic and swimming getaways. During the winter season the forest is open to cross country skiing, snow shoeing and snowmobiling.

Local golf courses include Monoosnock Country Club (nine holes) and Grand View Country Club (nine holes). Other courses in the area include Red Tail Golf Course (18 holes), Oak Hill Country Club (18 holes), and Settler's Crossing (nine holes).

=== Sports ===
Leominster High School has a long tradition of excellence in sports, and success is a huge focal point for the city. The Leominster High Blue Devils Football is one of the most successful high school football programs in the state including a record 12 State Super Bowl titles. The Leominster Blue Devils main rival is the Red Raiders of Fitchburg High School. The two football programs have played every year since 1894, and have played 112 consecutive Thanksgiving Day Games, and is second to only Needham and Wellesley for oldest high school football rivalry in the state. They also have an ice hockey team that plays at the Wallace Civic Center.

Legendary Leominster football players and coaches include Lou Little, Ronnie Cahill and Frank Novak.

The Wachusett Dirt Dawgs of the FCBL played at the Baseball Field at Doyle Field six summers from 2012 to 2017. Leominster currently hosts New England Football League semi-pro team, the Central Mass Sabercats.

The Leominster Dek-Hockey Center hosts youth dek-hockey games for the town of Leominster and Fitchburg. It is located in North Leominster off of Route 2 near North Leominster station of the Fitchburg Line.

== Government ==
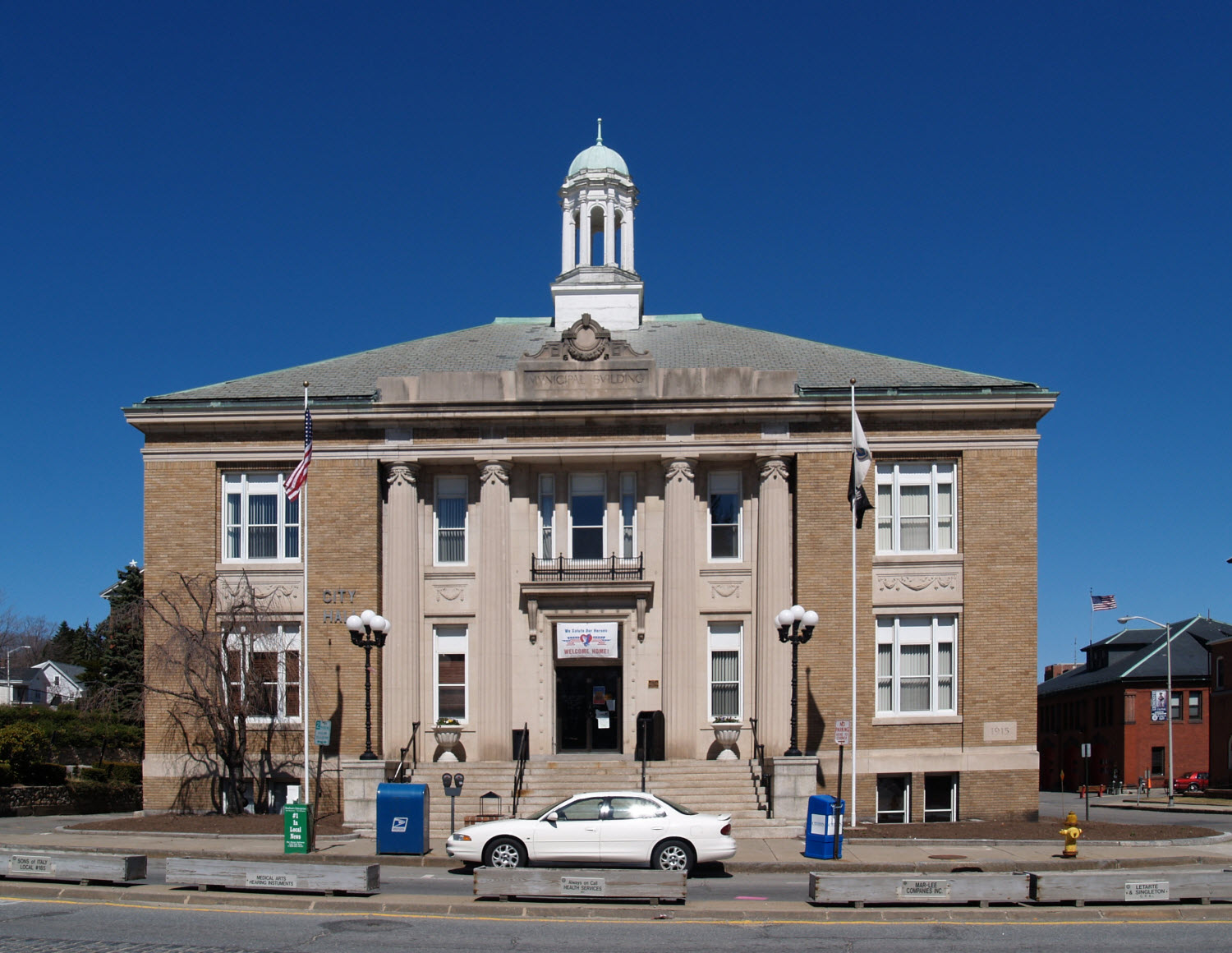
City Hall in downtown Leominster

Leominster operates under a mayor–council form of government in which the mayor holds sole executive power. The city is divided into five wards and voters select a mayor, a council member representing their ward and four at-large council members. The mayor has the power to appoint department heads and members of city boards, subject to approval by the city council. The current mayor of Leominster is Dean J. Mazzarella. Mazzarella was sworn in on January 3, 1994, and is serving his sixteenth (17th) term as mayor. He is the longest running mayor in Leominster history.

== Education ==
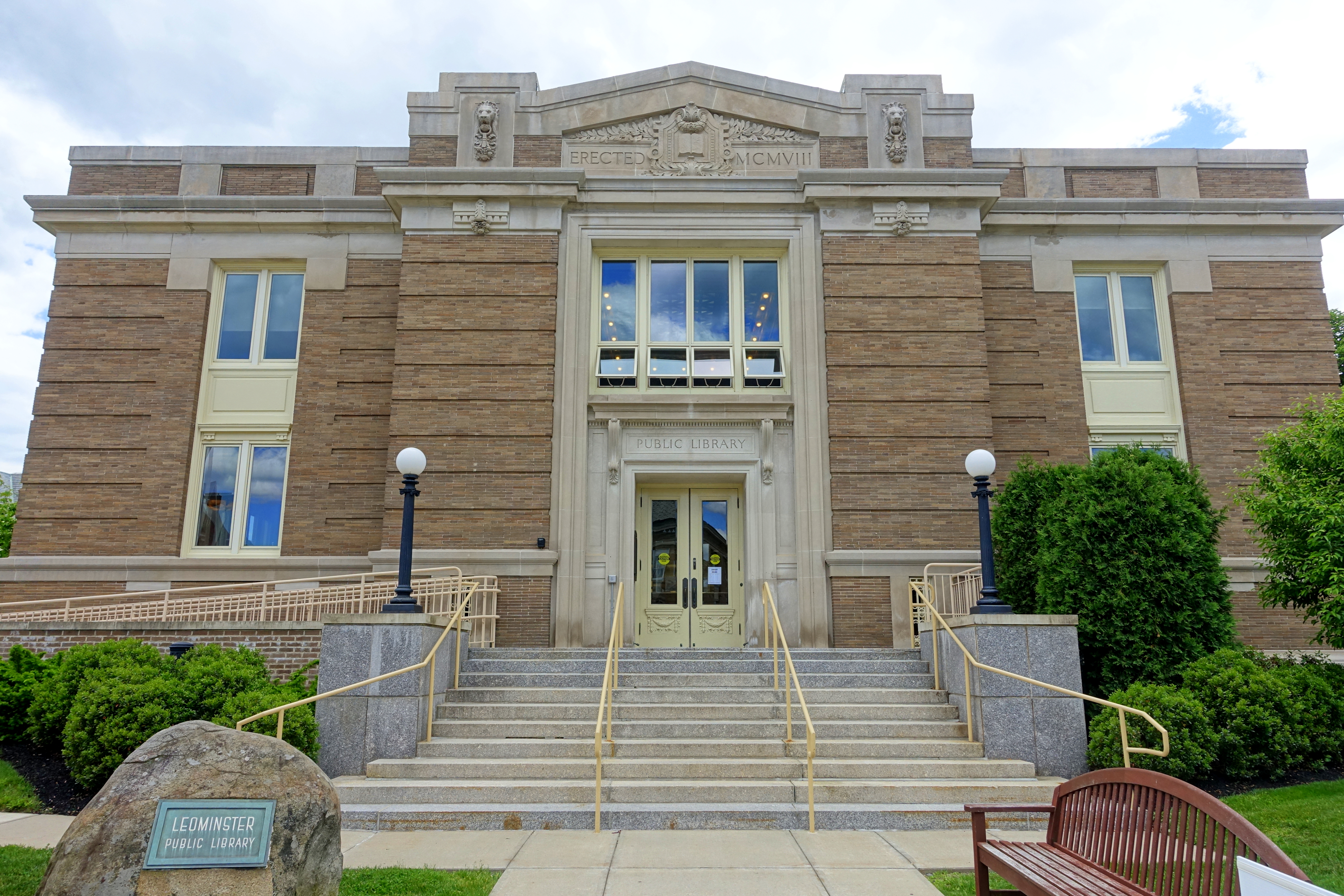
Leominster Public Library

Public education in the city is operated by the Leominster Public School District. Leominster has four neighborhood elementary schools that serve students in grades K–5 (Fall Brook, Johnny Appleseed, Northwest, Frances Drake), two middle schools (Samoset and Skyview) for grades 6–8, and Leominster High School for grades 9–12. Leominster High school is composed of an academic unit and a vocational unit called the Center for Technical Education. The district also operates three preschool programs: the Bennett School, Lincoln Preschool at Samoset and Priest Street School.

Leominster is also home to two private schools, St. Leo Catholic School and St. Anna Catholic School. St. Leo's School is part of Leominster's St. Leo Parish, while St. Anna's School is part of St. Anna Parish; both are affiliated with the Diocese of Worcester.

Post-secondary education opportunities include the Leominster campus of Mount Wachusett Community College and Fitchburg State University in neighboring Fitchburg.

The Leominster Public library is the city's main public library. Established in 1856, the public library moved from different locations until a permanent structure opened in 1910. In order to secure finances for the new structure, a library trustee applied for aid from philanthropist Andrew Carnegie. Carnegie donated $27,500, citing only if the town would appropriate 10 percent of that amount annually for the support of the library. In fiscal year 2008, the city of Leominster spent 1.39% ($1,183,076) of its budget on its public library—approximately $28 per person, per year ($34.29 adjusted for inflation in 2021). In 2018, the school district controversially paid $10,000 in ransom money to hackers in order to recover its computer systems after they were infected with the WannaCry ransomware and adequate backups were not available.

== Media ==
=== Newspapers ===
The Sentinel & Enterprise, a daily paper based in Fitchburg, is the main source of printed media in Leominster. The paper formed in 1973 by the merger of the Fitchburg Sentinel and the Leominster Enterprise, which dated back to 1873. The paper maintains a satellite news bureau in Leominster. Worcester County is also served by the daily Worcester Telegram & Gazette out of Worcester. Locally, the Leominster Champion serves as a weekly community paper. On the Scene Magazine serves greater Leominster as a monthly entertainment publication.

=== Television ===
Leominster Access Television (LTV) is the city's public access television station providing residents with local programs and meetings. The station broadcasts the annual Leominster-Fitchburg Thanksgiving football game every year.

=== Radio ===
Leominster is home to two radio stations. WCMX/1000 is a daytime-only religious radio station with Leominster as its community of license (it is based at the Twin City Baptist Temple in Lunenberg, however). On FM, there is a community radio station: WLPZ-LP/95.1, which was founded in 2017 and is managed by city resident Sonny Levine, with an all-volunteer staff.

== Transportation ==
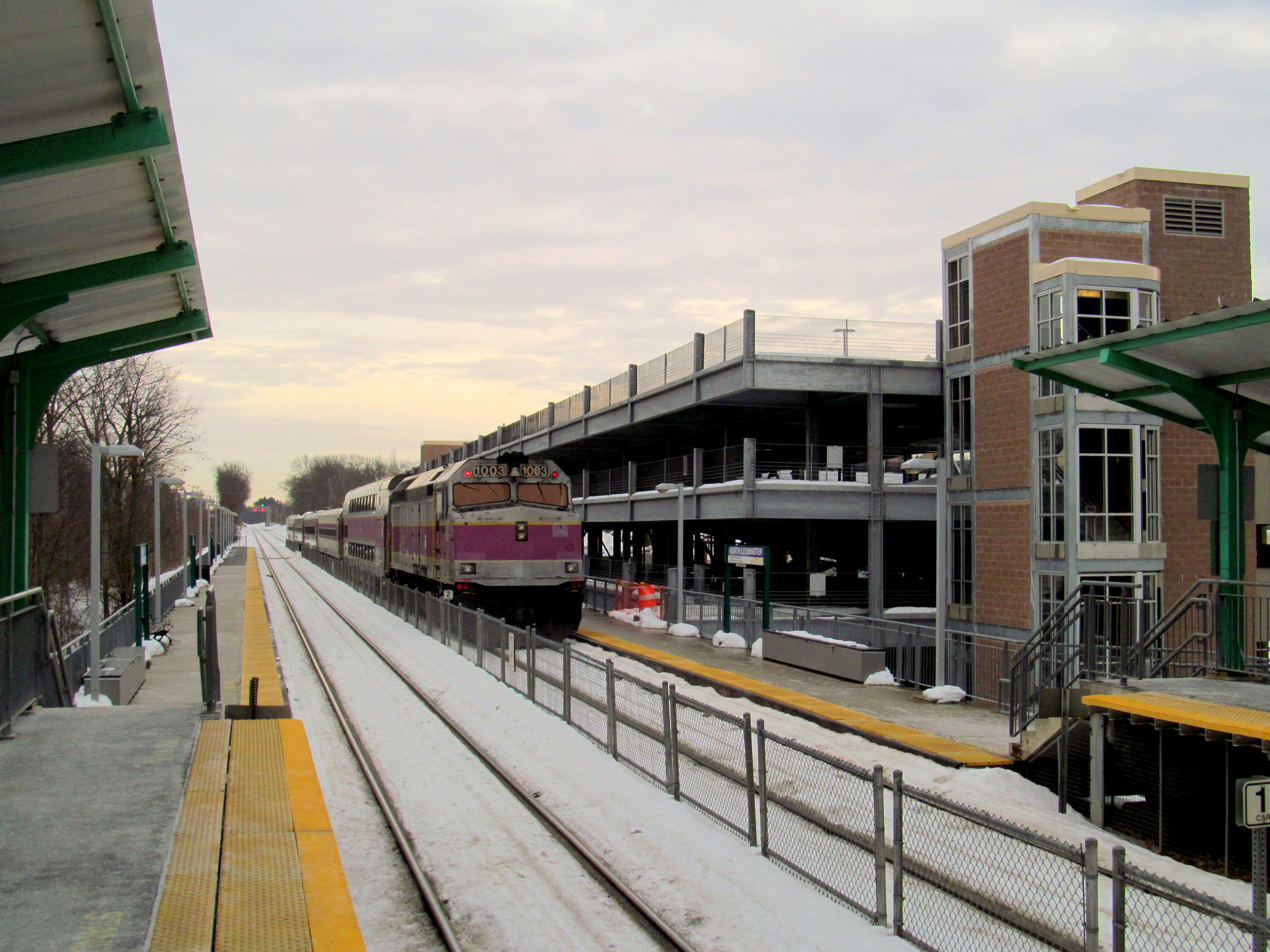
The MBTA station in North Leominster

Commuter rail service from Boston's North Station is provided by the MBTA with a stop in North Leominster on its Fitchburg Line.

Local bus transportation is provided by the Montachusett Regional Transit Authority, also known as the Montachusett Area Regional Transit or MART. This service operates in Leominster, Fitchburg, and Gardner.

Fitchburg Municipal Airport, a public airport in neighboring Fitchburg, serves as the air-hub of the area. However no major airlines have used the airport as a scheduled location in approximately half a century.

Freight train service is provided by CSX via the Fitchburg Secondary. This service moves rail cars to and from local businesses, such as Teknor Apex, a plastics plant, and WIN Waste Innovations, a garbage collection service.

== Notable people ==
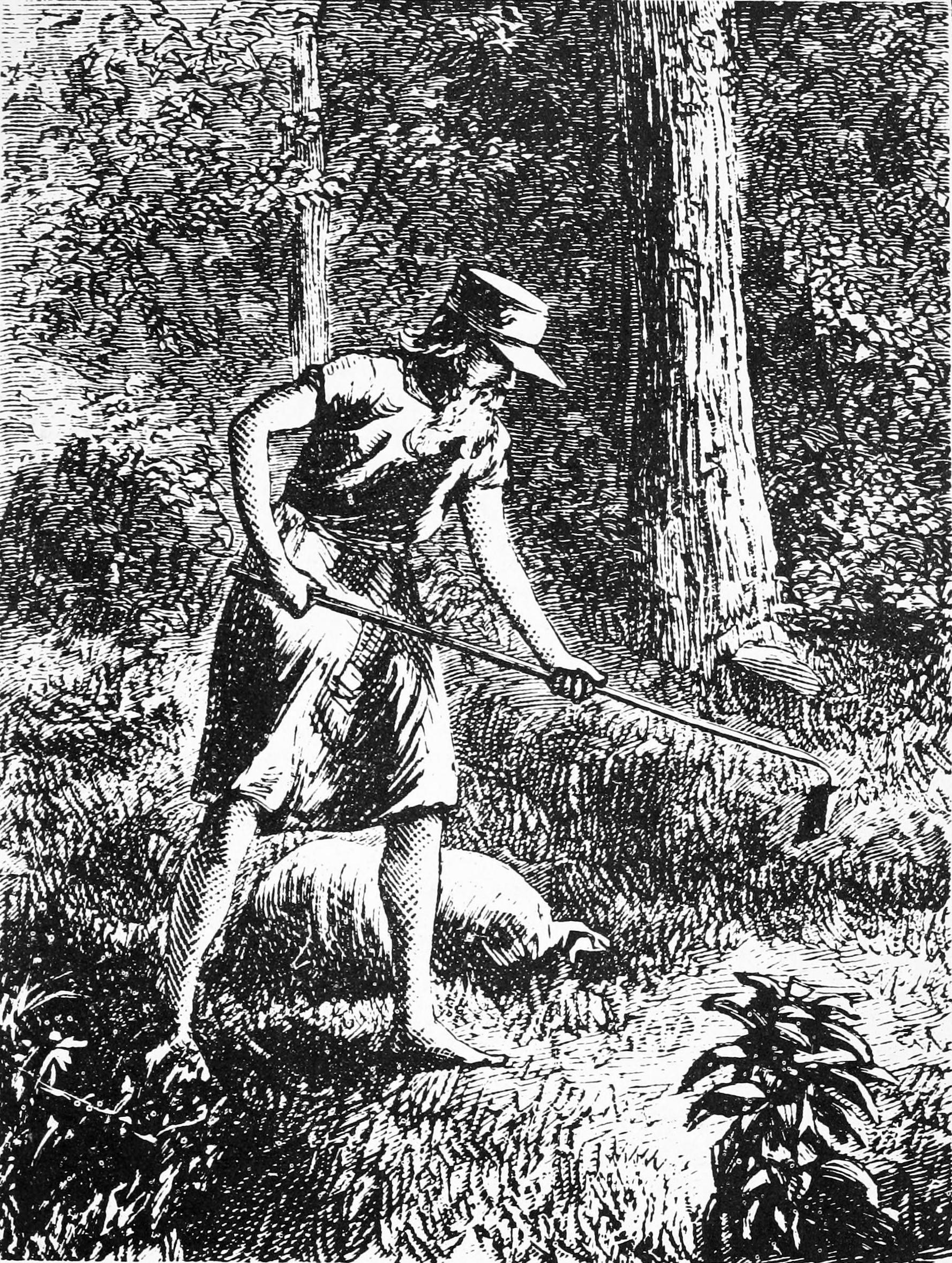
Johnny Appleseed, Harper's Magazine, 1871

- Rob Blanchflower, drafted by the Pittsburgh Steelers in the seventh round of the 2014 NFL draft
- John Chapman, better known as Johnny Appleseed, American pioneer nurseryman
- Robert Cormier, author of I Am the Cheese and The Chocolate War
- Mark Daigneault, professional basketball coach
- Paul DiGiovanni, musician; former guitarist of popular rock band Boys Like Girls (2005–2022)
- Dominik Dijakovic, professional wrestler
- Diego Fagúndez, professional soccer player for the LA Galaxy
- Rob Font, UFC mixed martial artist
- Paul Fusco, internationally known photojournalist
- Noah Gray, professional football player with the Kansas City Chiefs
- S. Wesley Haynes, architect
- KC Johnson, history professor best known for his role in disseminating the facts about the Duke University lacrosse rape case
- Kathy Ann Kelly, Irish-American singer, songwriter and musician born there, The Kelly Family member
- Adrian Nicole LeBlanc, author of Random Family: Love, Drugs, Trouble and Coming of Age in the Bronx
- Benjamin LaGuer, convicted felon
- Lou Little, football player and coach in the 1940s and 1950s
- Milt Morin, former NFL tight end for the Cleveland Browns
- Steve Moses, professional ice-hockey player for Jokerit Helsinki and Nashville Predators
- James Nachtwey, award-winning war photographer
- Mark Osowski, former NBA assistant coach for the New Orleans Hornets, the Golden State Warriors, and the Cleveland Cavaliers
- Naudline Pierre, visual artist
- Laurel Ptak, curator of contemporary art
- R. A. Salvatore, fantasy/science-fiction author
- Scott Spinelli, college basketball coach
- John J. Taylor, former US Congressman
- Oskari Tokoi, Finnish-American socialist politician and newspaper editor
- David I. Walsh, former Governor of Massachusetts and U.S. Senator
- Matt Kelly, drummer for Dropkick Murphys
- Michael Devin bassist for Whitesnake and The Dead Daisies
