= WLPZ-LP =

- Leominster, Massachusetts; United States
- Broadcast area: Leominster, Massachusetts
- Frequency: 95.1 MHz

Programming
- Format: Community radio

Ownership
- Owner: City of Leominster

History
- First air date: January 26, 2017

Technical information
- Licensing authority: FCC
- Facility ID: 195191
- Class: L1
- ERP: 21 watts
- HAAT: 64.2 meters (211 ft)
- Transmitter coordinates: 42°32′16.3″N 71°43′31.2″W

Links
- Public license information: LMS
- Webcast: Listen live
- Website: wlpz.org

WLPZ-LP (95.1 FM) is a community radio station licensed to Leominster, Massachusetts and serves the Leominster area. Its broadcast license is held by the City of Leominster and is operated by a staff of all volunteers and broadcasts 24 hours a day 7 days a week. WLPZ's studios are located in the city's Gallagher Building; its transmitter is located off Sunrise Avenue.

== History ==
This station received its original construction permit from the Federal Communications Commission on January 31, 2014. The new station was assigned the WLPZ-LP call sign by the FCC on March 11, 2016. The station received its license to cover from the FCC on January 26, 2017; it signed on the same day with a 45-minute test broadcast hosted by Leominster mayor Dean Mazzarella. WLPZ-LP's community radio format was described by Mazzarella as "information, fun and entertainment in the community"; emergency information is also broadcast by the station.
