= Monument Square Historic District (Leominster, Massachusetts) =

Historic district in Massachusetts, United States

- U.S. National Register of Historic Places
- U.S. Historic district
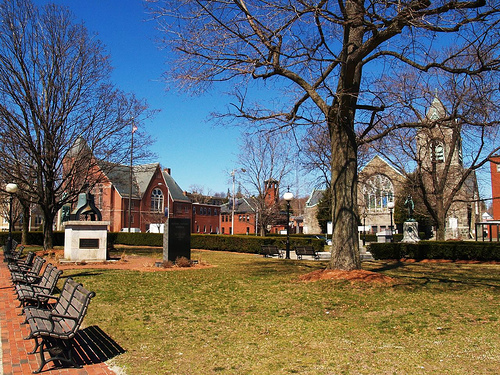

- Location within Massachusetts Location within the United States
- Location: Leominster, Massachusetts
- Coordinates: 42°31′37″N 71°45′37″W
- Architect: Multiple
- Architectural style: Mid 19th Century Revival, Late 19th And 20th Century Revivals, Late Victorian
- NRHP reference No.: 82004474
- Added to NRHP: July 8, 1982

The Monument Square Historic District is a historic district on Main and Water Streets, and Grove Avenue in Leominster, Massachusetts. The district includes Leominster's traditional town common or square, which is known as "Leominster Square" or "the Common."

Leominster's common is the site of several monuments, including: a monument marking the site of the town's second meeting house from 1775-1824 (which was replaced by the first town house), a Native American mortar (moved to the site in 1880), several veterans' memorials, and a firefighters' memorial. The Leominster Historical Society headquarters is adjacent to the square.

In 1743 the common was chosen as the site of the "First Church" meeting house in Leominster. At that time, an active church congregation was required for a town to gain a charter from the Massachusetts government. Originally a Congregationalist (Puritan) congregation, First Church's members later adopted a Unitarian theology in the early 19th century, causing the traditional Reformed (Calvinist) members to leave the building and found what is now Pilgrim Congregational Church, also located on the common. The First Church congregation was funded with state tax revenue until 1835, when Massachusetts separated its churches from state funding.

The historic district also contains many 19th-century buildings, and the area was added to the National Register of Historic Places in 1982. The city hall and various churches and businesses are adjacent to the square.

== See also ==
- National Register of Historic Places listings in Worcester County, Massachusetts
