= Mark Osowski =

American basketball player and coach (1963–2004)

Mark Osowski (February 14, 1963 – August 22, 2004) was a head coach for the Continental Basketball Association's Connecticut Pride, a college coach; and assistant coach for the Charlotte Hornets, the Golden State Warriors, and the Cleveland Cavaliers under Paul Silas. Osowski died on August 22, 2004, at the age of 41 from complications of pancreatitis.

Osowski was a native of Leominster, Massachusetts and was very involved with his hometown community, sponsoring the Catherine Osowski Memorial Scholarship at his alma mater, Leominster High School, granted to students seeking careers in nursing. He also started and carried on the Mark Osowski Pro Basketball Camp for boys and girls.
