= Frank Novak (American football) =

American football coach

Personal information
- Born: May 18, 1938 (age 88); Leominster, Massachusetts

Career information
- High school: Leominster (MA)
- College: Northern Michigan

Career history
- Northern Michigan (1966–1970) Assistant coach; Northern Michigan (1971–1972) Offensive coordinator; East Carolina (1973) Offensive coordinator; Virginia (1974–1975) Quarterbacks coach; Western Illinois (1976–1977) Offensive coordinator; Holy Cross (1978–1983) Offensive coordinator; Oklahoma Outlaws (1984) Running backs coach; Birmingham Stallions (1985) Wide receivers coach; Missouri (1988) Running backs coach; Houston Oilers (1989––1993) Running backs coach; Houston Oilers (1994) Special teams coach; Detroit Lions (1995–1996) Special teams coach; San Diego Chargers (1997–1998) Special teams coach; Green Bay Packers (2000–2004) Special teams coach

Frank Novak (born c. 1940) is an American former football coach who is best known for coaching special teams in the National Football League (NFL).

== Early career ==
Novak was born in Leominster, Massachusetts, and attended Leominster High School. He later played football at Northern Michigan University, where he earned NCAA Division II All-American honors as a quarterback in 1961. After college, Novak spent the 1962 training camp with the Toronto Argonauts of the Canadian Football League.

== Coaching career ==
Novak coached high school football in New London, Connecticut and Iron Mountain, Michigan. He then returned to NMU in 1966 under head coach Rollie Dotsch, where he spent 6 years as a coach including the final 2 seasons as offensive coordinator. During this time, one of his players was future Michigan head coach Lloyd Carr. Also on the NMU staff were notable coaches Jerry Glanville and Carl Reese, both of whom Novak would coach alongside later in their careers. Over the next 10 seasons he coached offensive backs or served as offensive coordinator at various colleges and universities, including stints with head coach Sonny Randle at East Carolina and Virginia.

In 1984 Novak coached running backs for the Oklahoma Outlaws of the United States Football League under head coach Woody Widenhofer. The following season, he coached wide receivers for the USFL Birmingham Stallions under Rollie Dotsch, reuniting him with his former boss at NMU. Dostch had originally recommended Novak to Widenhofer, whom he had coached with on the Pittsburgh Steelers.

Novak returned to the NCAA ranks for the 1988 season to coach running backs at Missouri, who were coached by Woody Widenhofer after the dissolution of the USFL.

== NFL Coaching Career ==
Novak began coaching running backs in the NFL in 1989 with the Houston Oilers under head coach Jerry Glanville. Novak and Glanville had previously served as assistant coaches together at Northern Michigan University. In 1990, Jack Pardee was named coach of the Oilers and retained Novak, and in 1994 he was named special teams coordinator. Novak also served as special teams coordinator with the Detroit Lions for 1995-1996, San Diego Chargers 1997-1998, and the Green Bay Packers from 2000-2005. Novak had joined the Chargers when friend Kevin Gilbride was hired as head coach, and resigned when Gilbride was fired after the 1998 season.

During the 2000 season, Novak was pantsed during practice by quarterback Brett Favre as a practical joke.

Pro Bowl kicker Rob Bironas credits Novak with helping find another kicking job in the NFL. Bironas had been cut by the Green Bay Packers in 2002 after signing as an undrafted free agent.

Novak was associated with the Run and shoot offense during his time in the USFL and with the Oilers and Chargers.

== Personal life ==
Novak is currently retired from professional coaching and resides in Oxford, Michigan. He serves as a motivational speaker and also volunteers as a high school football coach at Leominster High School and Lake Orion High School. In 2012, Frank married noted Metro Detroit realtor Suzanne Fodor.

Novak has five grown children from a previous marriage. One of his sons, Jason, is currently head strength and conditioning coach with the Michigan State University. Jason had previously served as head strength and condition coach at Central Michigan University, Yale and Alabama State. Novak is also the maternal grandfather to former American Professional Baseball Relief Pitcher Matt Picucci
