= Dupont Viscoloid Company =

Former plastics manufacturer

The Dupont Viscoloid Company, lnc.
- Industry: plastics
- Founded: 1901
- Defunct: November 1977
- Headquarters: Leominster, Massachusetts; United States
- Key people: Bernard W. Doyle
- Products: hair combs, brushes, mirrors, toilet articles, hair ornaments, toys and novelties.

The Dupont Viscoloid Company, Inc. is a former plastics manufacturer based in Leominster, Massachusetts.

== History ==
The company was founded by Alexander Paton, Ludwig Stross and Bernard W. Doyle in 1901 as the Sterling Comb Company. In 1912, the three men consolidated a number of smaller plastics manufactures under the name Viscoloid Company. The company pioneered the use of pyroxylin plastic in hair combs, toilet articles, and a number of different products. In 1914, the Viscoloid Company began marketing pyroxylin plastic toys. The toy industry quickly became the company's most profitable, and Viscoloid was soon the leading pyroxylin plastic toy manufacturer in America. By 1923, Bernard Doyle had taken over the company and "The Viscoloid" spanned 106 buildings and was the largest employer in Leominster. In 1925, the company was sold to the Dupont Company of Leominster and was renamed the Dupont Viscoloid Company, Inc. The company would continually be a giant in the plastics industry until closing in November 1977.
