= Doyle Community Park & Center =

Urban park and open reservation

Coordinates: 42°32′53″N 71°46′27″W

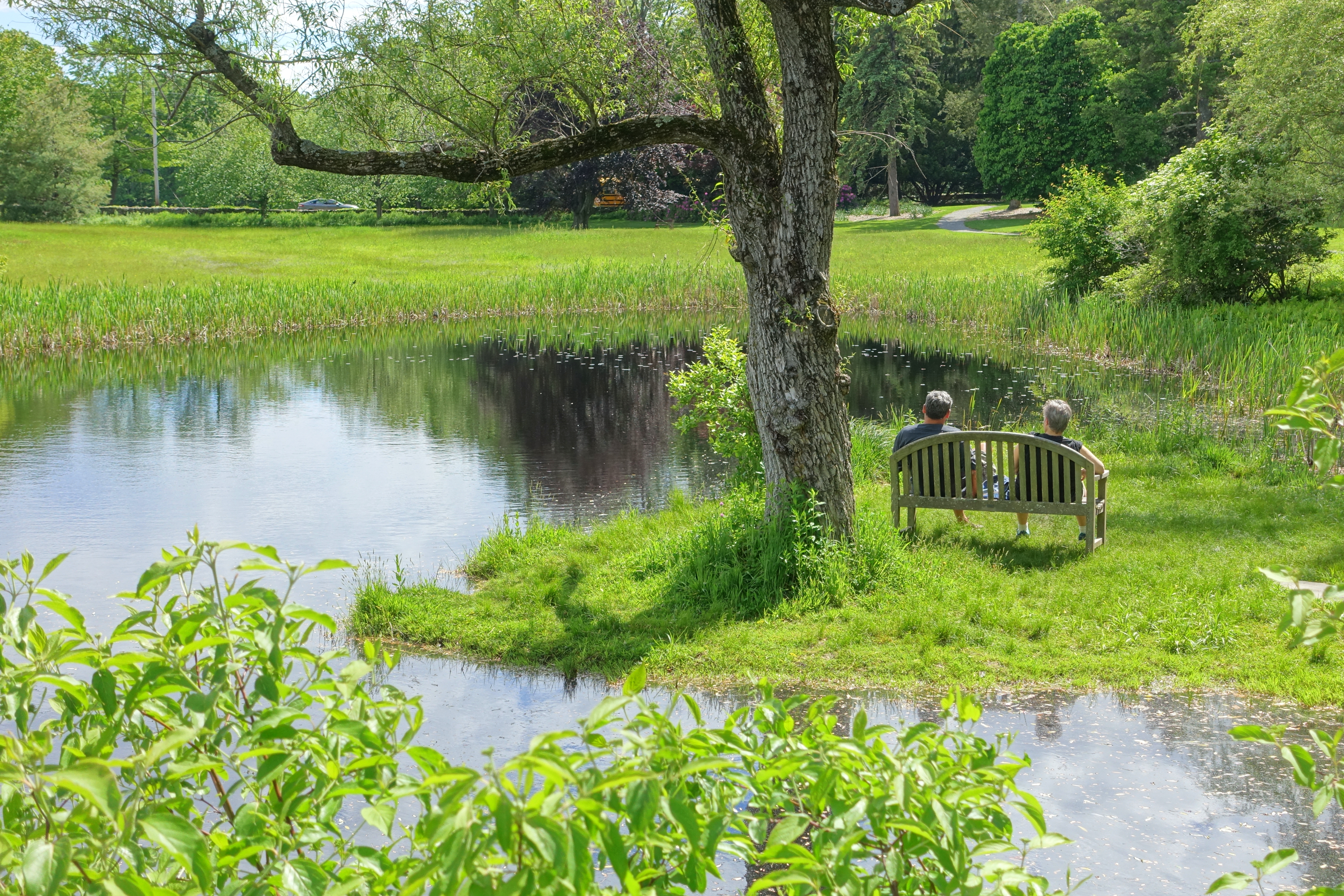
- Pond
- Interactive map of Doyle Community Park & Center
- Established: 1981
- Operator: The Trustees of Reservations
- Website: Doyle Community Park

The Doyle Community Park & Center, located in the city of Leominster, Massachusetts, United States, is a 170-acre (69 ha) landscaped urban park and open space reservation managed by The Trustees of Reservations, a non-profit conservation organization. It is also the location of the Doyle Center: a conservation education center, regional office, and green building initiative. The property consists of three main areas: Pierce Meadow, a landscaped urban park and former estate of Harry W. Pierce; the Doyle Center grounds, buildings, and adjoining woodlots; and a hay field (worked by local dairy farm by the name of Cherry Hill) and adjoining wetland.

The Doyle Community Park was acquired as a gift of Louise I. Doyle in 1981. Additional lands were acquired in six purchases from 1991 to 2001. Reservation parking lots are located on Lindell Avenue. The property is open to walking, cross country skiing, picnicking, nature study, and dog walking. There are 3.5 miles of walking trails throughout the reservation.

== Pierce Meadow ==
Pierce Meadow was part of a private estate belonging to Harry W. Pierce circa 1900. Pierce's estate once featured "a twenty-nine-room stucco mansion with a ballroom and conservatory, a matching stable, extensive horse paddocks, Pierce Pond, and an extensive system of bridle paths through woodland and around the pond." 10 acres (4.0 ha) of Pierce's estate have been restored as a community park; the pond and bridle paths are not part of the current reservation. Trees and shrubs on the property are part of the estate's original plantings.

== Doyle Center ==
The Doyle Center is a green architecture initiative and regional office, conference, and education center. The structure, designed by HKT Architects of Somerville, Massachusetts and landscape architects Hines Wasser & Associates, was registered for a Leadership in Energy and Environmental Design gold certification with the United States Green Building Council. The building includes "photovoltaic panels, high-efficiency lighting and controls, a displacement ventilation system, high performance windows, a high performance building envelope, geothermal wells and carbon dioxide monitoring systems;" it incorporates green materials such as desks made of sunflower seeds, bamboo and cork flooring, and recycled fiber carpet and paneling.
