= Doyle Memorial Park =

- Location within North Dakota
- Location: McIntosh County, North Dakota, United States
- Nearest city: Wishek, North Dakota
- Coordinates: 46°12′06″N 99°28′40″W
- Area: 21 acres (8.5 ha)
- Elevation: 2,011 ft (613 m)
- Established: 1925
- Named for: J. J. Doyle
- Owner: City of Wishek

Doyle Memorial Park is a 21-acre (8.5 ha) public recreation area occupying a peninsula on Green Lake five miles (8.0 km) southeast of Wishek in McIntosh County, North Dakota. The park was formerly known as Doyle Memorial State Recreation Area. It became the property of the City of Wishek on July 1, 2017, and is operated by the Wishek Park Board.

The park is used for swimming, fishing, boating, camping, and picnicking. It was established in 1925 on land donated by J.J. Doyle, a Wishek businessman who served in the North Dakota House of Representatives in 1909 and 1915, and for whom the park is named.
