= September 2023 northeastern U.S. floods =

North American flood event in 2023

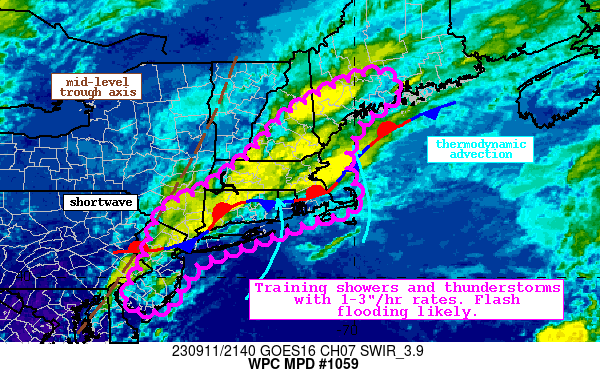
- A mesoscale precipitation discussion concerning flooding across portions of the Northeastern United States issued by the Weather Prediction Center on September 11, 2023
- Cause: Heavy rains

Meteorological history
- Duration: September 8 – September 13, 2023

Flood
- Max. rainfall: 9.5 in (240 mm) in Leominster, Massachusetts

Tornado outbreak
- Tornadoes: 4
- Max. rating: EF1 tornado

Overall effects
- Fatalities: 2
- Injuries: Several
- Damage: $65.9 million
- Areas affected: Massachusetts, Rhode Island, Connecticut, New Jersey, Maryland

In a six-day period from September 8 to September 13, 2023, slow-moving thunderstorms associated with a low-pressure area caused flash flooding across multiple states across the Northeastern and Mid-Atlantic regions of the United States. A stationary front, combined with a convergence zone, caused significant flooding, prompting the National Weather Service to issue multiple flash flood warnings and two flash flood emergencies, one for the city of Leominster, Massachusetts, and the other for the Baltimore, Maryland, area. Several minor injuries occurred during the severe weather event, and hundreds of homes and vehicles were flooded. Evacuations also occurred after concerns of a compromised dam near a neighborhood of Leominster, and all schools in the city were closed the day after the floods. Massachusetts governor Maura Healey declared a state of emergency for Leominster and North Attleborough following the floods.

== Meteorological synopsis ==
On September 11, a stationary frontal boundary, combined with a low-pressure area in eastern New Jersey and a convergence zone extending across Connecticut, Rhode Island, and Massachusetts, brought slow-moving showers and thunderstorms to the Northeastern United States, bringing heavy rainfall across portions of the region. Favorable thermodynamics also supported thunderstorm development, and surface-based convective available potential energy in the 1000-1500 J/kg values were also in place across a small portion of the region. Matthew Belk, a National Weather Service meteorologist, stated that the flood was a "200-year event".

== Impact ==
Severe storms on September 8 alone led to 190,000 power outages.

=== Massachusetts ===
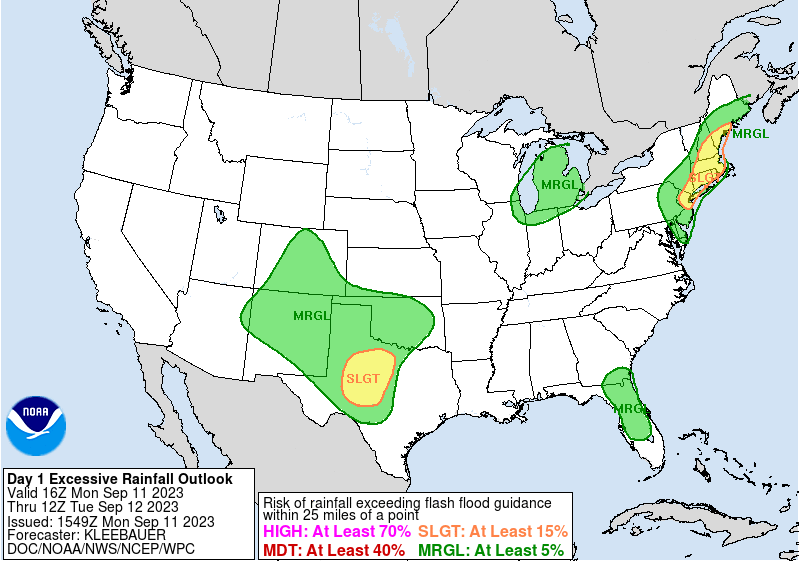
A Day 1 excessive rain outlook issued at 12:00 PM EDT, highlighting a slight risk across the Northeastern United States

On September 10, the Sagamore Bridge was closed due to flash flooding.

On September 11, streets and numerous homes were flooded in the city of Leominster, and the downtown area there was also flooded, where buildings were flooded and a few partially collapsed. A sinkhole also opened near a Cadillac car dealership, damaging vehicles there. Massachusetts governor Maura Healey described the flooding "catastrophic", and a flash flood emergency was issued for Leominster and Fitchburg. Residential areas in neighborhoods near Leominster were asked to immediately evacuated as concerns were raised over the Barrett Park Pond Dam, which was compromised and was already in poor condition. Homes near Route 117 near Fall Brook, a neighborhood of Leominster, were "significantly damaged". School buildings near Leominster also suffered damage, and more than 15 roads, including portions of the Massachusetts Turnpike (I-90), Route 13 and Route 2, were closed due to flooding and road damage. At least 9.5 inches (240 mm) of rain fell in several hours in Leominster, and an evacuation order was also issued for low-lying areas near Fall Brook and the North Nashua River. Several minor injuries also occurred, as many vehicles were submerged in floodwaters. MBTA Commuter Rail service was also affected, with trains and buses being terminated, diverted, or originating at a different station, including trains along the Fitchburg Line. Leominster mayor Dean Mazzarella stated, "Find a high spot somewhere. Find a high spot and stay there until this is over.", and also claimed that at least 11 inches (280 mm) of rain fell. More than $40 million in damages occurred to city infrastructure.

Flood damage also occurred in North Attleborough, where 200 homes were flooded, including basements, and vehicles were submerged. Several roads were closed, and the emergency operations center was activated there. Two Boston Red Sox games were postponed due to the rainfall. Nearly 2,400 power outages occurred across the state. A tornado warning was also issued for Bristol, Norfolk, and Plymouth counties after the storm which prompted the warning in Rhode Island moved into southern portions of the state.

=== Connecticut ===
On September 13, streets were flooded in West Hartford, submerging a car, as a flash flood warning was issued for Hartford. Roads were also flooded in Farmington, prompting law enforcement to place signs and barricades across the flooded area. At least eight people were rescued in Danbury as cars were submerged in floodwaters. Route 317 was closed near Roxbury, and a Holiday Inn hotel was damaged by floods. Flash flood warnings were issued for several counties in the state, and a severe thunderstorm warning was issued for the Hartford area as streets and buildings were flooded there. Flooding also occurred in Bristol, where flooded roads submerged at least three cars. One of the storms which produced heavy rainfall spawned an EF1 tornado near Danielson, and Killingly, downing trees and causing minor damage to two homes, and a tornado warning was also issued for that area. Damage across Connecticut totaled $13,300.

=== Rhode Island ===
An apartment complex consisting of 24 apartments were affected by floods on September 11 in Cranston, where two dogs died and two cats went missing. Flooding impacted a shopping plaza, damaging businesses and prompting 25 people to be rescued from floodwaters. The West River overflowed, forcing a road to close after the roadway was under 4 feet (1.2 m) of water. Flooding also occurred in Cumberland, and North Providence. Floods caused delays on the Providence/Stoughton Line. The tornado which impacted areas near Danielson and Killingly, Connecticut crossed the border into Rhode Island, where trees and power lines were down in Foster. Damage in Rhode Island totaled to $15,800.

=== Maryland ===
On September 12, a flash flood emergency was issued for the entire Baltimore area as 3–5 in (76–127 mm) of rain fell. Several roads and highways, including portions of the Capital Beltway (I-495) and US 29 were closed due to floodwaters on the roadway, and flooding also stranded drivers on several roads in the city. More than 1,500 power outages occurred across the state. Flash flood warnings and a tornado warning was issued for parts of the state as the storms moved through. Damage in Maryland totaled to $548,000.

=== Elsewhere ===
On September 9, flash flooding in Pennsylvania, specifically across Lackawanna County, Luzerne County and Wyoming County resulted in two deaths and $25.3 million in property damage to 459 residences. Further east, a Major League Baseball game at Yankee Stadium between the New York Yankees and Milwaukee Brewers was postponed by over two and a half hours due to heavy rainfall.

On September 11, in New Jersey, more than 1,500 power outages occurred, and a water rescue took place after a woman and her dog were in a submerged vehicle in Perth Amboy. Several streets were flooded in Hoboken as a flood watch was in effect for northeastern parts of the state. Before a Monday Night Football game between the New York Jets and Buffalo Bills, a shelter-in-place warning was issued at MetLife Stadium. Across New York City-area airports, at John F. Kennedy International Airport, 70 flights were cancelled and 274 flights were delayed, while at LaGuardia Airport, 132 flights were cancelled and 194 were delayed on September 11. A Major League Baseball game between the New York Mets and the Arizona Diamondbacks at Citi Field was delayed by over an hour. Damage in New York totaled to $7,000.

== Aftermath ==
All schools in Leominster were closed on September 12, the day after the floods, due to flood damage that occurred in the school buildings. Boat rescue and emergency response teams were dispatched to areas in northern Massachusetts following the floods. Looting also occurred in flooded businesses in Providence, Rhode Island. Massachusetts governor Maura Healey declared a state of emergency for Leominster and North Attleborough as she toured the flood damage in those locations. The American Red Cross assisted flood victims in Cumberland and North Providence, Rhode Island, and two schools opened as shelters to flood victims in Leominster.
